= List of islands and towns in Tonga =

The following list gives all islands and cities (villages and hamlets) in Tonga in alphabetical order with many local areas and nicknames as well. Coordinates are given for the centre of each place. All place names are given in the Tongan language.

== Haʻapai group ==
=== Lifuka group ===
- Fatumanongi 19.769°S 174.731°W
- Foa 19.749°S 174.298°W
  - Faleloa, Houmaleʻia 19.734°S 174.288°W
  - Fangaleʻounga 19.753°S 174.323°W
  - Fotua 19.749°S 174.318°W
  - Lotofoa 19.742°S 174.305°W
  - Nukunamo 19.715°S 174.273°W
- Fotuhaʻa 19.812°S 174.719°W
  - Fotuhaʻa township 19.812°S 174.719°W
- Hakauata 19.846°S 174.517°W
- Haʻano, (Loto haʻa Ngana (central Ngana tribe)) 19.674°S 174.278°W
  - Fakakakai 19.685°S 174.274°W
  - Haʻano town 19.662°S 174.290°W
  - Muitoa 19.652°S 174.294°W
  - Pukotala 19.679°S 174.281°W
- Kao 19.669°S 175.014°W
  - ʻApikakai 19.648°S 175.016°W
  - Topuefio 19.690°S 175.025°W
- Lifuka, Foʻi ʻoneʻone (sand crumb) 19.807°S 174.344°W
  - Haʻatoʻu 19.811°S 174.350°W
  - Holopeka 19.784°S 174.341°W
  - Koulo 19.777°S 174.341°W
  - Pangai, district's capital; nickname: Fanga ʻi he sī (harbour at sea) 19.806°S 174.346°W
  - Tongoleleka, Vai ko Paluki (Paluki's water) 19.816°S 174.353°W
- Limu 20.021°S 174.455°W
- Lofanga 19.826°S 174.549°W
  - Lofanga township 19.826°S 174.549°W
- Luahoko 19.672°S 174.391°W
- Luangahu 19.872°S 174.474°W
- Meama 19.756°S 174.561°W
- Moʻungaʻone 19.637°S 174.484°W
  - Moʻungaʻone township 19.640°S 174.481°W
- Niniva 19.769°S 174.621°W
- Nukupule 19.780°S 174.534°W
- Ofolanga 19.600°S 174.450°W
- Tofua 19.748°S 175.065°W
  - Hokula 19.715°S 175.059°W
  - Hotaʻane 19.755°S 175.103°W
  - Manaka 19.760°S 175.028°W
- Uoleva 19.850°S 174.403°W
- Uonukuhahake 19.966°S 174.480°W
  - Tofanga 19.958°S 174.462°W
  - Uonukuhihifo 19.969°S 174.495°W
- ʻUiha 19.902°S 174.401°W
  - Felemea; nickname: ʻOtu Kinekina (Weary Islands) 19.910°S 174.410°W
  - ʻUiha township 19.892°S 174.405°W
  - Tatafa 19.876°S 174.418°W

=== Lulunga (archipelago) ===
- Fakahiku 20.044°S 174.701°W
- Fetoa 19.966°S 174.723°W
- Fonuaika 20.111°S 174.699°W
- Foua 20.004°S 174.740°W
- Haʻafeva 19.948°S 174.709°W
  - Haʻafeva township; nickname: Kolo ngatata (noisy town) 19.952°S 174.706°W
  - Fonuamaka 19.933°S 174.701°W
  - Kolo (Haʻapai) 19.949°S 174.690°W
  - Leteoʻo 19.962°S 174.693°W
  - Onoiki 19.964°S 174.699°W
- Kito 20.000°S 174.784°W
- Kotu 19.948°S 174.797°W
  - Kotu township 19.948°S 174.797°W
- Lekeleka 20.069°S 174.605°W
- Luanamo 20.022°S 174.714°W
- Matuku 19.964°S 174.743°W
  - Matuku township 19.958°S 174.745°W
- Nukulei 20.052°S 174.731°W
- Pepea 20.045°S 174.705°W
- Putuputua 19.912°S 174.705°W
- Teaupa 19.976°S 174.736°W
- Tokulu 20.102°S 174.788°W
- Tungua 20.016°S 174.764°W; nickname: Sani Tungua (glorious Tungua)
  - Tungua township; nickname: Tainamu ʻa Paea (orphan's mosquito net) 20.018°S 174.759°W
- ʻOʻua 20.038°S 174.679°W
  - ʻOʻua township 20.040°S 174.681°W

=== ʻOtu Muʻomuʻa group ===
- Fetokopunga 20.302°S 174.534°W
- Fonoifua 20.278°S 174.629°W
  - Fonoifua township 20.279°S 174.632°W
  - Meama (Muʻomuʻa) 20.267°S 174.645°W
  - Tanoa 20.293°S 174.632°W
- Hunga Haʻapai 20.543°S 174.406°W
- Hunga Tonga 20.534°S 174.374°W
- Kelefesia 20.502°S 174.735°W
- Lalona 20.346°S 174.520°W
- Mango 20.329°S 174.709°W
  - Mango township 20.323°S 174.715°W
- Mangoiki 20.320°S 174.731°W
- Nomuka 20.250°S 174.794°W
  - Nomuka township 20.257°S 174.797°W
  - Loto 20.254°S 174.790°W
  - Puhoʻava 20.247°S 174.788°W
  - Tefisi 20.259°S 174.789°W
- Nomuka iki 20.282°S 174.804°W
  - Muifuiva 20.267°S 174.817°W
- Nuku 20.475°S 174.760°W
- Nukufaiau 20.294°S 174.694°W
- Nukutula 20.251°S 174.689°W
- Tau 20.484°S 174.759°W
- Tele-ki-Vavaʻu 20.313°S 174.521°W
- Tele-ki-Tonga 20.395°S 174.529°W
- Tonumea 20.458°S 174.760°W

== Niua group ==
- Niuafoʻou; nickname: Kaho mo Vailahi (reed with big lake) 15.590°S 175.632°W
  - Angahā, island capital 15.561°S 175.628°W
  - Fataʻulua 15.567°S 175.616°W
  - Futu (abandoned) 15.582°S 175.668°W
  - Kolofoʻou 15.562°S 175.628°W
    - Aleleʻuta 15.562°S 175.628°W
  - Mataʻaho 15.571°S 175.611°W
  - Muʻa 15.590°S 175.603°W
  - Petani 15.612°S 175.611°W
  - Sapaʻata 15.561°S 175.625°W
  - Tongamamaʻo 15.608°S 175.608°W
  - ʻEsia 15.562°S 175.632°W
  - Motu Lahi 15.587°S 175.633°W
  - Motu Molemole 15.582°S 175.644°W
  - Motu Siʻi 15.595°S 175.649°W
  - Motu ʻAʻali 15.589°S 175.650°W
- Niuatoputapu 15.956°S 173.744°W
  - Falehau 15.945°S 173.729°W
  - Hihifo, island capital 15.954°S 173.758°W
  - Vaipoa 15.947°S 173.746°W
  - Hakautuʻutuʻu 15.934°S 173.743°W
  - Hungana 15.953°S 173.767°W
  - Nukuseilala 15.966°S 173.762°W
  - Sikaihaʻa 15.964°S 173.762°W
  - Tafuna 15.963°S 173.764°W
  - Tavili 15.958°S 173.766°W
  - Tuʻunga 15.964°S 173.764°W
- Tafahi 15.852°S 173.710°W
  - Tafahi (village) 15.840°S 173.716°W

== Tongatapu group ==
- Minerva Reefs (also see Republic of Minerva) 23.38°S 178.97°W
  - Tele-ki-Tokelau
  - Tele-ki-Tonga
- Tongatapu (island) 21.2°S 175.2°W
  - Vahe Hahake (eastern district)
    - Āfa 21.132°S 175.055°W
    - Fātumu 21.214°S 175.109°W
    - Fuaʻamotu, incorrectly: Fuʻamotu; nickname: Vai ko Latai (Latai's water) 21.264°S 175.139°W
    - Hamula 21.250°S 175.111°W
    - Haveluliku 21.205°S 175.104°W
    - Haʻasini 21.250°S 175.110°W
    - Hoi 21.166°S 175.111°W
    - Holonga 21.192°S 175.143°W
    - Kolonga; nickname: ʻUtu longoaʻa (noisy coast) 21.130°S 175.067°W
    - Lāvengatonga 21.235°S 175.107°W
    - Makaunga 21.141°S 175.119°W
    - Malapo 21.201°S 175.153°W
    - Manuka 21.123°S 175.098°W
    - Muʻa, district capital; nickname: Paki mo e toʻi (picked with sap) 21.182°S 175.119°W
      - Lapaha 21.179°S 175.115°W
      - Tatakamotonga; nickname: Kolo kakala (fragrant town) 21.188°S 175.122°W
    - Nakolo 21.267°S 175.124°W
    - Navutoka 21.127°S 175.107°W
    - Niutōua 21.144°S 175.040°W
    - Nukuleka; nickname: Vai-kāsila (bilge water) 21.152°S 175.126°W
    - Pelehake; nickname: Ī ʻo Lupea (fan of Lupea) 21.216°S 175.139°W
    - Talafoʻou 21.136°S 175.118°W
    - Talasiu 21.175°S 175.115°W
    - ʻAlakifonua, short: ʻAlaki 21.194°S 175.134°W
  - Vahe Hihifo (western district)
    - Fāhefa 21.145°S 175.333°W
    - Fatai 21.134°S 175.278°W
      - Matafonua 21.134°S 175.275°W
    - Foʻui, (Lolo paongo (pandanus fruit scented oil)) 21.112°S 175.338°W
    - Haʻakame; nickname: Hala toa mui (road of ironwood trees) 21.184°S 175.284°W
    - Haʻakili 21.087°S 175.337°W
    - Haʻalalo 21.185°S 175.281°W
    - Haʻatafu 21.071°S 175.327°W
    - Haʻutu 21.143°S 175.330°W
    - Haʻavakatolo; nicknames: Vai ko hiva (singing water), Pua ko fanongo talanoa (flower listening to the story) 21.107°S 175.338°W
    - Houma; nickname: Mapu ʻa Vaea (whistle (blowholes) of Vaea) 21.170°S 175.303°W
    - Kalaʻau 21.139°S 175.336°W
    - Kanokupolu; nicknames: Folaʻosi (a typical dancedress), Niu tuʻu tolu (3 standing palmtrees) 21.075°S 175.332°W
    - Kolovai; nicknames: Taunga peka (flying foxes), Fala O Setane (Satan Mat) 21.110°S 175.339°W
    - Lakepa 21.142°S 175.279°W
    - Lomaiviti 21.169°S 175.258°W
    - Masilamea; nickname: Vai ko lele ʻa lulu (running owl's water) 21.125°S 175.326°W
    - Matahau 21.143°S 175.313°W
    - Matangiake 21.162°S 175.269°W
      - Haʻafeva 21.162°S 175.269°W
    - Neiafu 21.078°S 175.340°W
    - Nukunuku 21.133°S 175.300°W
    - Teʻekiu 21.129°S 175.319°W
    - Vaotuʻu 21.162°S 175.309°W
    - ʻAhau; nickname: Ahi ʻo Ulakai (Ulakai's sandalwood tree) 21.091°S 175.338°W
    - ʻUtulau; nickname: Alafolau Heavula 21.190°S 175.269°W
  - Vahe Loto (central district)
    - Folaha 21.170°S 175.183°W
    - Haveluloto, short: Havelu; nicknames: Piki pea vela (sticky then burn), Paini tuʻu ua (2 standing ironwood trees) 21.152°S 175.216°W
    - Haʻateiho 21.179°S 175.230°W
      - ʻĀtele 21.183°S 175.225°W
    - Hōfoa; nickname: Fonu mo e moa (turtle and chicken) 21.132°S 175.227°W
    - Longoteme 21.180°S 175.168°W
    - Nukuhetulu 21.167°S 175.190°W
    - Nukuʻalofa, national capital 21.13°S 175.20°W
      - Fanga ʻo Pilolevu
      - Fasi mo e afi
      - Fongoloa
      - Hala ʻo Vave
      - Halaano
      - Halafoʻou
      - Halaleva
      - Houmakelikao
      - Hunga
      - Kape
      - Kolofoʻou
      - Kolomotuʻa, original Nukuʻalofa proper
        - Sopu ʻo Tāufaʻāhau, short: Sopu
          - Sia ko Veiongo
          - Tongataʻeapa
      - Longolongo
        - Haʻavakaʻotua
        - Kapetā
        - Tavatuʻutolu
        - Tuʻakātakilangi, incorrectly: Tuʻatakilangi
      - Lopaukamea
      - Mailetaha
      - Mataika
      - Matutuana
      - Maui
      - Maʻufanga, obsolete: Maʻofanga
      - Ngeleʻia
      - Pahu
      - Pātangata
      - Pīkula
      - Takaunove
      - Telekava
      - Teufaiva
      - Tufuenga
      - Vaolōloa
      - ʻAmaile
      - ʻĀnana
      - ʻUmusī
    - Pea; nicknames: Vai ko puna (upwelling water), Niuvākai (palmtree watchtower 21.171°S 175.234°W
    - Popua, short for: Vaʻepopua 21.152°S 175.161°W
    - Puke; nickname: Vai ko ʻoa (basket water) 21.132°S 175.238°W
    - Tofoa 21.159°S 175.226°W
      - Koloua 21.162°S 175.229°W
    - Tokomololo; nickname: Vai ko Tuʻilokomana (Tuʻilokomana's water) 21.177°S 175.245°W
    - Vainī 21.196°S 175.174°W
      - Nualei 21.189°S 175.179°W
    - Veitongo 21.186°S 175.194°W
      - Lotohaʻapai 21.186°S 175.215°W
  - Fafā 21.088°S 175.158°W
  - Fukave 21.093°S 175.031°W
  - Kanatea 21.166°S 175.209°W
  - Makahaʻa 21.116°S 175.153°W
  - Malinoa 21.036°S 175.129°W
  - Manima 21.125°S 175.147°W
  - Mataʻaho 21.162°S 175.154°W
  - Monūafe 21.104°S 175.139°W
  - Motutapu 21.093°S 175.057°W
  - Moʻunu 21.088°S 175.158°W
  - Moʻungatapu 21.182°S 175.140°W
  - Ngofonua 21.192°S 175.164°W
  - Nuku 21.088°S 175.023°W
  - Nukunukumotu 21.144°S 175.146°W
    - Siesia 21.138°S 175.149°W
  - Oneata 21.128°S 175.145°W
  - Pangaimotu 21.125°S 175.158°W
  - Poloʻa 21.092°S 175.243°W
  - Talakite 21.161°S 175.155°W
  - Tau 21.021°S 175.005°W
  - Toketoke 21.065°S 175.293°W
  - ʻAtā 21.056°S 175.004°W
  - ʻAtatā 21.050°S 175.251°W
    - ʻAtatā (village) 21.050°S 175.251°W
  - Tufuka 21.068°S 175.254°W
  - Velitoa Hahake 21.085°S 175.133°W
  - Velitoa Hihifo 21.084°S 175.137°W
  - ʻAlakipeau 21.088°S 175.243°W
  - ʻEueiki 21.117°S 174.983°W
    - Fāʻimata 21.119°S 174.979°W
  - ʻOnevai 21.086°S 175.111°W
  - ʻOnevao 21.092°S 175.097°W
- ʻAta 22.149°S 176.178°W
- ʻEua; nicknames: Fungafonua (landtop), Vai ko Kahana (Kahana's water) 21.381°S 174.933°W
  - Angahā 21.362°S 174.957°W
  - Haʻatuʻa 21.393°S 174.962°W
  - Houma 21.316°S 174.931°W
  - Kolomaile 21.392°S 174.952°W
  - ʻEuafoʻou 21.375°S 174.954°W
    - Fataʻulua 21.377°S 174.955°W
    - Futu 21.366°S 174.955°W
    - Mataʻaho 21.373°S 174.952°W
    - Muʻa 21.380°S 174.954°W
    - Pangai 21.362°S 174.954°W
    - Petani 21.388°S 174.953°W
    - Sapaʻata 21.375°S 174.955°W
    - Tongamamaʻo 21.385°S 174.953°W
    - ʻEsia 21.371°S 174.956°W
  - Tufuvai, short: Tufu 21.363°S 174.966°W
  - ʻOhonua, island capital; nickname: Taha kae afe (one worth a thousand; an ironwood tree) 21.344°S 174.954°W
    - Taʻanga 21.3407°S 174.950°W
  - Kalau 21.471°S 174.953°W

== Vavaʻu group ==
- Aʻa 18.742°S 174.047°W
- Faioa 18.663°S 173.924°W
- Fangasito 18.816°S 174.083°W
- Fatumanga 18.787°S 174.173°W
- Fonuafoʻou 18.786°S 173.962°W
- Fonualei 18.024°S 174.316°W
- Fonualei 18.725°S 174.067°W
- Fonuaʻunga 18.758°S 173.956°W
- Fonuaʻoneʻone 18.815°S 174.065°W
- Fuaʻamotu 18.791°S 174.008°W
- Hakaufasi 19.014°S 174.011°W
- Hunga; nicknames: Fā-ko-Avahungalu (screwpine of A.), Vaonukonuka (nukonuka bushes) 18.678°S 174.122°W
  - Hunga township 18.685°S 174.122°W
  - Fofoa 18.700°S 174.140°W
  - Foiata 18.713°S 174.138°W
  - Foilifuka 18.713°S 174.145°W
  - Kalau 18.689°S 174.137°W
  - Luafatu 18.668°S 174.076°W
  - Luamoko 18.681°S 174.105°W
- Kapa 18.705°S 174.030°W
  - Falevai 18.705°S 174.037°W
  - Kapa township 18.719°S 174.024°W
  - Vakataumai 18.703°S 174.036°W
  - ʻOtea 18.687°S 174.036°W
  - Luakapa 18.689°S 174.047°W
  - Nuku 18.712°S 174.044°W
- Katofanga 18.735°S 174.042°W
- Kenutu 18.694°S 173.927°W
  - Lolo 18.702°S 173.927°W
- Lape 18.717°S 174.084°W
  - Lape township 18.718°S 174.086°W
- Late 18.806°S 174.646°W
- Lekeleka 18.755°S 174.000°W
- Luahiapo 18.796°S 174.042°W
- Lualoli 18.835°S 174.013°W
- Luatafito 18.821°S 173.976°W
- Luaʻafuleheu 18.812°S 174.026°W
- Luaʻatofuaʻa 18.838°S 174.048°W
- Luaʻui 18.776°S 174.054°W
- Mafana 18.681°S 173.955°W
- Maninita 18.854°S 173.997°W
- Moʻunu 18.748°S 174.070°W
- Muʻomuʻa 18.790°S 174.112°W
- Nuapapu 18.692°S 174.077°W
  - Nuapapu township 18.699°S 174.074°W
  - Matamaka 18.708°S 174.068°W
  - Alinonga 18.706°S 174.080°W
  - Kitu 18.682°S 174.068°W
  - Luaʻofa 18.716°S 174.057°W
- Ofu 18.698°S 173.961°W
  - Ofu township 18.692°S 173.962°W
- Ovaka 18.742°S 174.103°W
  - Ovaka township 18.742°S 174.097°W
- Ovalau 18.748°S 174.079°W
- Pangaimotu 18.679°S 174.001°W
  - Pangaimotu township 18.683°S 173.998°W
  - ʻUtulei 18.651°S 173.997°W
  - Afo 18.704°S 173.998°W
  - Fafine 18.711°S 173.980°W
  - Lotuma 18.658°S 174.011°W
  - Tapana 18.712°S 173.993°W
  - Fānautapu 18.722°S 173.985°W
    - Lautala 18.720°S 173.996°W
    - Nukutahanga 18.721°S 173.991°W
    - Tuʻanukulau 18.716°S 173.990°W
- Sisia 18.728°S 174.054°W
- Tahifehifa 18.808°S 173.999°W
- Taula 18.843°S 174.013°W
- Taunga 18.742°S 174.013°W
  - Taunga township 18.741°S 174.014°W
  - Ngau 18.753°S 174.010°W
  - Taʻuta 18.742°S 174.002°W
- Tokū 19.163°S 174.177°W
- Totokafonua 18.755°S 174.126°W
- Totokamaka 18.762°S 174.126°W
- Tuʻungasika 18.657°S 174.071°W
- Vakaʻeitu 18.722°S 174.103°W
  - Kulo 18.715°S 174.099°W
  - Langitoʻo 18.724°S 174.088°W
  - Tangatasito 18.712°S 174.099°W
- Vavaʻu, or Vavaʻu lahi, the main island; nickname: ʻUtukalongalu (wave shaker cliff), Haʻafuluhao (a name) 18.6°S 174.0°W
  - Faleono 18.629°S 173.942°W
  - Feletoa 18.608°S 173.972°W
  - Fungamisi 18.654°S 173.981°W
  - Haʻakio 18.618°S 173.944°W
  - Haʻalufuli 18.606°S 173.934°W
  - Holonga 18.587°S 173.952°W
  - Houma 18.628°S 173.944°W
  - Leimatuʻa 18.599°S 173.983°W
  - Longomapu 18.644°S 174.057°W
  - Makāve 18.650°S 173.966°W
  - Mangia 18.622°S 173.957°W
  - Mataika 18.614°S 173.967°W
  - Neiafu, district's capital; nickname: Vai ko Lēlea (Lēlea's water) 18.647°S 173.984°W
    - Falaleu
    - Fangatongo
    - Faʻokula
    - Hopokanga
    - Houmelei
    - Kameli
    - Masilamea
    - Matangiake
    - Neiafutahi
    - Sailoame
    - Saineai
    - Vaipua
    - ʻOtumapa
    - ʻUtulangivaka
  - Talau 18.645°S 173.993°W
  - Taoa 18.627°S 173.986°W
  - Taʻanea 18.606°S 173.941°W
  - Tefisi 18.630°S 174.017°W
  - Toula 18.673°S 173.983°W
  - Tuʻanekivale 18.626°S 173.921°W
  - Tuʻanuku; nickname: Tavakefaiʻana (a tropic bird) 18.661°S 174.033°W
  - Utui 18.635°S 173.959°W
  - Vaimalo 18.634°S 174.005°W
  - Kiato 18.651°S 173.942°W
  - Koloa 18.643°S 173.931°W
    - Holeva 18.638°S 173.922°W
    - Koloa township 18.642°S 173.937°W
  - Kolotahi 18.638°S 174.011°W
  - Koloʻuta 18.637°S 174.009°W
  - Matuʻanua 18.568°S 173.956°W
  - Motulekaleka 18.632°S 173.927°W
  - Nuku 18.658°S 173.950°W
  - Okoa 18.651°S 173.951°W
    - Okoa township 18.649°S 173.952°W
  - Pousini 18.609°S 173.936°W
  - Tueʻia 18.656°S 173.954°W
  - Tulie 18.638°S 173.944°W
- ʻEuaiki 18.764°S 174.021°W
- ʻEuakafa 18.756°S 174.037°W
- ʻOloʻua 18.671°S 173.959°W
  - ʻOloʻua township 18.669°S 173.957°W
- ʻOto 18.699°S 174.058°W
- ʻUmuna 18.680°S 173.924°W
- ʻUtungake 18.673°S 174.025°W
  - Ngaʻunoho (or: Talihau) 18.682°S 174.021°W
  - ʻUtungake township 18.664°S 174.021°W
  - Mala 18.688°S 174.023°W

== See also ==
- Administrative divisions of Tonga
- Lists of volcanoes
