= List of islands by name (T) =

This article features a list of islands sorted by their name beginning with the letter T.

== T ==
Island's Name	Island group(s)	Country/Countries
Tabuaeran	Line Islands	Kiribati
Tafahi	Niuas	Tonga
Tahaa	Windward Islands, Society Islands, French Polynesia	Overseas Lands of France
Tahanea	Tuamotus, French Polynesia	France
Tahifehifa	Vavaʻu group	Tonga
Tahiti	Windward Islands, French Polynesia	Overseas Lands of France
Tai A Chau	Soko Islands, Hong Kong	China
Tairajima	Tokara Islands part of the Satsunan Islands part of the Ryukyu Islands	Japan
Taisho-jima	Senkaku Islands	Administered by Japan, Claimed by: China and Republic of China
Taiwan		Republic of China
Takarajima	Tokara Islands part of the Satsunan Islands part of the Ryukyu Islands	Japan
Takapoto	King George Islands, Tuamotus, French Polynesia	France
Takaroa	King George Islands, Tuamotus, French Polynesia	France
Taketomi	Yaeyama Islands part of the Sakishima Islands part of the Ryukyu Islands	Japan
Takutea	Cook Islands	Cook Islands
Takuu	Papua New Guinea, Melanesia	Papua New Guinea
Talakite	Tongatapu group	Tonga
Talaud		Indonesia
Tana Qirqos	Lake Tana	Ethiopia
Tanegashima	Ōsumi Islands part of the Satsunan Islands part of the Ryukyu Islands	Japan
Tanna	Pacific Ocean	Vanuatu
Tanvat Island	Georgian Bay Ontario	Canada
Taohua	Zhoushan Archipelago	China
Tap Mun	Hong Kong	China
Tarama	Miyako Islands part of the Sakishima Islands part of the Ryukyu Islands	Japan
Tarout	Persian Gulf	Saudi Arabia
Tåsinge	Islands south of Funen	Denmark
Tasmania		Australia
Tau	Tongatapu group	Tonga
Tau	'Otu Mu'omu'a group of the Ha'apai group	Tonga
Taula	Vava'u group	Tonga
Taunga	Vava'u group	Tonga
Tautra	Trondheimsfjord	Norway
Tavira	Algarve islands	Portugal
Tavolara	Sardinia	Italy
Tawhiti Rahi	Poor Knights Islands	New Zealand
Tearaght	Blasket Islands	Ireland
Teaupa	Lulunga archipelago of the Haʻapai group	Tonga
Tegua	Torres Islands	Vanuatu
Tele-ki-Vava'u	'Otu Mu'omu'a group of the Haʻapai group	Tonga
Tele-ki-Tonga	'Otu Mu'omu'a group of the Haʻapai group	Tonga
Telendos	Dodecanese	Greece
Tematangi	Tuamotus, French Polynesia	France
Tenararo	Acteon Group, Tuamotus, French Polynesia	France
Tenarunga	Acteon Group, Tuamotus, French Polynesia	France
Tenerife	Canary Islands	Spain
Tepoto	Disappointment Islands, Tuamotus, French Polynesia	France
Tepoto	Raeffsky Islands, Tuamotus, French Polynesia	France
Teraina	Line Islands	Kiribati
Terceira	Azores	Portugal
Terre-de-Bas	Guadeloupe, Lesser Antilles	France
Terre-de-Haut	Guadeloupe, Lesser Antilles	France
Terschelling	West Frisian Islands, Friesland	Netherlands
Testáda	Beira Litoral Islands	Portugal
Tetiaroa	Windward Islands, French Polynesia	Overseas Lands of France
Texada	Gulf Islands, British Columbia	Canada
Texel	West Frisian Islands, North Holland	Netherlands
Thanet	British Isles	United Kingdom
Thasos	Aegean Sea	Greece
The Lake Isle of Innisfree	Lough Gill	Ireland
Thetis	Gulf Islands, British Columbia	Canada
Thibault	Lake Huron, Ontario	Canada
Thief Neck	Watts Bar Lake, Tennessee	United States
Thirasia	Cyclades	Greece
Thirty Thousand	Georgian Bay, Ontario	Canada
Thitu	Spratly Islands	Disputed between: China, Republic of China, Vietnam, Brunei, Philippines, and Malaysia
Thompson's	Allegheny River, Pennsylvania	United States
Tholen	Zeeland	Netherlands
Thousand	Saint Lawrence River, Split between: New York and Ontario	Split between: United States and Canada
Thousand		Indonesia
Three Mile	Pennsylvania	United States
Thurø	Islands south of Funen	Denmark
Thymaina		Greece
Tiburón	Sonora	Mexico
Ticao Island	Masbate	Philippines
Tiengemeten	South Holland	Netherlands
Tiger	Louisiana	United States
Tikehau	Tuamotus, French Polynesia	France
Tikei	King George Islands, Tuamotus, French Polynesia	France
Tikopia	Santa Cruz Islands	Solomon Islands
Tilos	Dodecanese	Greece
Timbalier	Timbalier Bay, Louisiana	United States
Timor	Maritime Southeast Asia	Split Between East Timor and Indonesia
Tinhosa Grande	Gulf of Guinea	São Tomé and Príncipe
Tinhosa Pequena	Gulf of Guinea	São Tomé and Príncipe
Tini Heke	The Snares	New Zealand
Tinos	Cyclades	Greece
Tiree	Inner Hebrides	Scotland
Tiritiri Matangi	Hauraki Gulf	New Zealand
Titi	Muttonbird Islands	New Zealand
Tjeldøya	Vesterålen, Troms	Norway
Tjøme	Vestfold	Norway
Tjörn	Bohuslän	Sweden
Toau	Palliser Islands, Tuamotus, French Polynesia	France
Tofua	Lifuka group of the Haʻapai group	Tonga
Toga	Torres Islands	Vanuatu
Togo	Mississippi River,Louisiana	United States
Tokashikijima	Kerama Islands part of the Okinawa Islands part of the Ryukyu Islands	Japan
Tokelau		New Zealand
Toketoke	Tongatapu group	Tonga
Toku	Vavaʻu group	Tonga
Tokulu	Lulunga archipelago of the Haʻapai group	Tonga
Tokunoshima	Amami Islands part of the Satsunan Islands part of the Ryukyu Islands	Japan
Tomek Island 2	Platte River, Nebraska	United States
Tonches	Georgian Bay, Ontario	Canada
Tong	Admiralty Islands	Papua New Guinea
Tongareva	Cook Islands	Cook Islands
Tongariki	Shepherd Islands	Vanuatu
Tongatapu	Tongatapu group	Tonga
Tongoa	Shepherd Islands	Vanuatu
Tonregee Island	Upper Lough Erne	Ireland
Tonumea	'Otu Mu'omu'a group of the Haʻapai group	Tonga
Toothaker	Mooselookmeguntic Lake, Maine	United States
Torcello	Venetian Lagoon	Italy
Toronto	Lake Ontario, Ontario	Canada
Torsö	Lake Vänern	Sweden
Tortuga		Haiti
Tory		Ireland
Toshima	Izu Islands	Japan
Tosterön-Aspön		Sweden
Totokafonua	Vavaʻu group	Tonga
Totokamaka	Vavaʻu group	Tonga
Townhead	Ohio River, Kentucky	United States
Traanish	Upper Lough Erne	Ireland
Tranqueira	Beira Litoral islands	Portugal
Trasna Island	Lower Lough Erne	Ireland
Treasure	Ussuri River	China
Treasure	San Francisco Bay, California	United States
Treasure	Lake McKellar, Tennessee	United States
Treasure	Puget Sound, Washington	United States
Treat	Illinois River, Illinois	United States
Três Postes	Beira Baixa islands	Portugal
Tresco	Isles of Scilly	United Kingdom
Trinidad	Lesser Antilles	Trinidad and Tobago
Tristan da Cunha	Tristan da Cunha Archipelago	(United Kingdom) British overseas territory of Saint Helena, Ascension and Tristan da Cunha
Trodely Island	Nunavut	Canada
Trzcinice	Oder Lagoon islands	Poland
Tsing Yi	Hong Kong	China
Tsushima		Japan
Tue'ia	Vavaʻu group	Tonga
Tufuka	Tongatapu group	Tonga
Tulie	Vavaʻu group	Tonga
Tullu Gudo	Lake Zway	Ethiopia
Tully	Mississippi River, Illinois	United States
Tung Lung Chau	Hong Kong	China
Tungua	Lulunga archipelago of the Haʻapai group	Tonga
Tunica	Mississippi River,Louisiana	United States
Tunø	Kattegat	Denmark
Tūpai	Windward Islands, Society Islands, French Polynesia	Overseas Lands of France
Turbina	Beira Litoral Islands	Portugal
Tureia	Tuamotus, French Polynesia	France
Turkey	Rock River, Illinois	United States
Turtle	Tawi-Tawi	Philippines
Tutu	Arno Atoll	Marshall Islands
Tuvalu		Tuvalu
Tu'ungasika	Vavaʻu group	Tonga
Twelevemile	Mobile River, Alabama	United States
Twelve Mile	Illinois River, Illinois	United States
Twelve Mile	Ohio River, Kentucky	United States
Twelve Mile	Allegheny River,Pennsylvania	United States
Two Branch	Mississippi River, Missouri	United States
Tysnesøy	Sunnhordland, Vestland	Norway
Tyson	Lake Huron, Ontario	Canada

== See also ==
- List of islands (by country)
- List of islands by area
- List of islands by population
- List of islands by highest point
