= List of islands by name (N) =

This article features a list of islands sorted by their name beginning with the letter N.

== N ==
Island's name	Island group	Country/Dependency
Nā Mokulua	(Hawaii) Hawaiian Islands	United States
Naart	Upper Lough Erne	Ireland
Nærøya		Norway
Nagy-Pandúr-sziget	Danube River	Hungary
Nahaleg	Dahlak Archipelago	Eritrea
Naissaar	Tallinn Bay, Gulf of Finland	Estonia
Nakanoshima	Tokara Islands part of the Satsunan Islands part of the Ryukyu Islands	Japan
Namdrick Atoll	Ralik Chain	Marshall Islands
Namorik	Ralik Chain	Marshall Islands
Namu Atoll	Ralik Chain	Marshall Islands
Namyit	Spratly Islands	Disputed between: China, Republic of China, Vietnam, Brunei, Philippines, and Malaysia
Nancowry	Nicobar Islands	India
Nanshan	Spratly Islands	Disputed between: China, Republic of China, Vietnam, Brunei, Philippines, and Malaysia
Nantucket	Massachusetts	United States
Napuka	Tuamotus, French Polynesia	France
Nargin	Baku Bay	Azerbaijan
Nashawena	Elizabeth Islands, Massachusetts	United States
Nassau	Cook Islands	Cook Islands (self-governing in free association with New Zealand)
Natuna	Natuna Islands	Indonesia
Nauru		Nauru
Naushon	Elizabeth Islands, Massachusetts	United States
Navassa	Greater Antilles	Claimed by the United States and Haiti
Navy	Niagara River, Ontario	Canada
Naxos	Cyclades	Greece
Ndrova	Admiralty Islands	Papua New Guinea
Neal	Ohio River, West Virginia	United States
Necker	(Hawaii) Northwestern Hawaiian Islands	United States
Necker	British Virgin Islands	United Kingdom
Neebish Island	St. Marys River, Michigan	United States
Negei	British Columbia	Canada
Negit	Mono Lake, California	United States
Negros	Visayas	Philippines
Nell	Kwajalein Atoll, Ralik Chain	Marshall Islands
Nelson	Alaska	United States
Nelson	South Shetland Islands	Claimed by: Argentine Antarctica, Argentina, Antártica Chilena Province of Chile, and British Antarctic Territory of theUnited Kingdom
Nengonengo	Tuamotus, French Polynesia	France
Nerlandsøya		Norway
Nesøya	Salten, Nordland	Norway
Neuwerk	Wadden Sea	Germany
Neville	Pennsylvania	United States
Nevis	Leeward Islands group of the Lesser Antilles	Saint Kitts and Nevis
New Britain	Bismarck Archipelago	Papua New Guinea
New Era Bar	Willamette River, Oregon	United States
New Ireland	Bismarck Archipelago	Papua New Guinea
New	Falkland Islands	United Kingdom
New Guinea	Melanesia	Divided between Indonesia and Papua New Guinea
Newfoundland	Newfoundland and Labrador	Canada
New Hanover	Bismarck Archipelago	Papua New Guinea
New Mecklenburg	Bismarck Archipelago	Papua New Guinea
New World	Newfoundland and Labrador	Canada
Ngamotukaraka	Motukawao Islands, Hauraki Gulf	New Zealand
Ngofonua	Tongatapu group	Tonga
Ngumi	Bajuni Islands	Somalia
Nguna	Shepherd Islands	Vanuatu
Ngwēl	Torres Islands	Vanuatu
Niau	Tuamotus, French Polynesia	France
Nichol	Buckhorn Lake Ontario	Canada
Nicholson	Allegheny River, Pennsylvania	United States
Nicollet	Mississippi River, Minnesota	United States
Nicomen	British Columbia	Canada
Nightingale	Tristan da Cunha	(United Kingdom) British overseas territory of Saint Helena, Ascension and Tristan da Cunha
Nihiru	Tuamotus, French Polynesia	France
Nīhoa	(Hawaii) Northwestern Hawaiian Islands	United States
Niʻihau	(Hawaii) Hawaiian Islands	United States
Niijima	Izu Islands	Japan
Nikumaroro	Phoenix Islands	Kiribati
Ninemile	Allegheny River, Pennsylvania	United States
Nine Mile	Mississippi River, Iowa	United States
Niniva	Lifuka group of the Haʻapai group	Tonga
Nisida	Flegree Islands	Italy
Nisyros	Dodecanese	Greece
Niuafo'ou	Niua group	Tonga
Niuatoputapu	Niua group	Tonga
Niue		Niue (self-governing in free association with New Zealand)
Nixes Mate	Boston Harbor, Massachusetts	United States
Nizki	Semchi Islands group of the Near Islands in the Aleutian Islands, Alaska	United States
Île de Noirmoutier	Vendée, Pays de la Loire	France
Île aux Noix	Richelieu River, Quebec	Canada
Nólsoy	Faroe Islands	Denmark
Nomans Land	Massachusetts	United States
Nomuka	'Otu Mu'omu'a group of the Haʻapai group	Tonga
Nomuka iki	'Otu Mu'omu'a group of the Haʻapai group	Tonga
No-Name	Allegheny River, Pennsylvania	United States
Nonamesset	Elizabeth Islands, Massachusetts	United States
Nootka	British Columbia	Canada
Nora	Dahlak Archipelago	Eritrea
Nordkvaløya		Norway
Nordaustlandet	Northeast Land, Svalbard	Norway
Norderney	East Frisian Islands	Germany
Norderoog	North Frisian Islands	Germany
Nordmarsch-Langeneß	North Frisian Islands	Germany
Nordre Kvaløy		Norway
Nordstrand	North Frisian Islands	Germany
Nordstrandischmoor	North Frisian Islands	Germany
Norfolk Island	Norfolk Island	Australia
North	New Zealand	New Zealand
North Andaman	Andaman Islands	India
North Bass	Lake Erie, Ohio	United States
North Brother	Andaman Archipelago, Indian Ocean	India
North Brother	East River, New York	United States
North Brother	Chagos Archipelago, Indian Ocean	United Kingdom
North Brother	Atlantic Ocean, Connecticut	United States
North Brother	Seven Brothers, Bab-el-Mandeb	Djibouti
North Dumpling	Fisher's Island Sound, New York	United States
North Harbour	Lake Erie, Ontario	Canada
North Haven	Penobscot Bay, Maine	United States
North Havra	Shetland Islands	Scotland
North Hero	Lake Champlain, Vermont	United States
North Limestone	Georgian Bay Ontario	Canada
North Long		Namibia
North Manitou	Lake Michigan, Michigan	United States
North Otter	Georgian Bay Ontario	Canada
North Monomoy	Cape Cod, Massachusetts	United States
North Ronaldsay	The North Isles, Orkney Islands	Scotland
North Sentinel	Andaman Islands	India
North Stradbroke Island	Moreton Bay Islands	Australia
North Twin	Apostle Islands, Wisconsin	United States
North Uist	Outer Hebrides	Scotland
North Watcher	Georgian Bay Ontario	Canada
Northeast Cay	Spratly Islands	Disputed between China, Republic of China, Vietnam, Brunei, Philippines, and Malaysia
Northwest	Timbalier Bay, Louisiana	United States
Northwest Burnt	Georgian Bay Ontario	Canada
Isle of Noss	Shetland Islands	Scotland
Nottawasaga	Georgian Bay Ontario	Canada
Nøtterøy	Vestfold	Norway
Nuapapu	Vavaʻu group	Tonga
Isla Nueva	Antártica Chilena Province	Chile
Nuguria	Papua New Guinea, Melanesia	Papua New Guinea
Nuku	Tongatapu group	Tonga
Nuku	'Otu Mu'omu'a group of the Haʻapai group	Tonga
Nukuatea	Wallis Island	France
Nukufaiau	'Otu Mu'omu'a group of the Haʻapai group	Tonga
Nukufotu	Wallis Island	France
Nukuhifala	Wallis Island	France
Nukulei	Lulunga archipelago of the Haʻapai group	Tonga
Nukuloa	Wallis Island	France
Nukumanu	Papua New Guinea, Melanesia	Papua New Guinea
Nukunione	Wallis Island	France
Nukunukumotu	Tongatapu group	Tonga
Nukuoro	Pohnpei	Federated States of Micronesia
Nukupule	Lifuka group of the Haʻapai group	Tonga
Nukutapu	Wallis Island	France
Nukuteatea	Wallis Island	France
Nukutepipi	Duke of Gloucester Islands, Tuamotus, French Polynesia	France
Nukutula	'Otu Mu'omu'a group of the Haʻapai group	Tonga
Nunivak	Bering Sea, Alaska	United States
Nyord	Baltic Sea	Danmark

== See also ==
- List of islands (by country)
- List of islands by area
- List of islands by population
- List of islands by highest point
