= Mataʻuvave =

Mata’uvave was the name given to a dynasty of male chiefs presiding over the Ha’apai Island Group of Tonga from the 15th century until the mid-1980s. The first Mata’uvave was appointed to a gubernatorial role by Tu’i Tonga Kau’ulufonua I to increase the Tu’i Tonga's control over Ha’apai. The first few generations of the title subdued several islands in northern Ha’apai and undertook several major building projects, most notably pigeon mounds, the Huluipaongo burial mound, and the Velata fortress. Within a few generations the Mata’uvave attempted to rule independently, antagonizing the authority of chiefs in Tongatapu and causing a confrontation that the Mata’uvave eventually lost. They were relegated to a line of nobility called ‘eiki si’i, or “a minor chief without importance.”

== Creation of the Title ==
The Mata’uvave dynasty was created out of the drastic political restructuring of the Tongan elite following the assassination of the 23rd Tu’i Tonga, Takalaua, in the late 14th or early 15th century. Takalaua was succeeded by his son Kau’ulufonua as the 24th Tu’i Tonga. Kau’ulufonua chased the assassins, according to tradition, to ʻEua, Ha’apai, Vava’u, Niuatoputapu, Futuna, Uvea, and eventually killed them in brutal fashion in Samoa, thereby earning the name Kau’ulufonuafekai, or Kau’ulufonua the savage. At the same time, the secular duties of the Tu’I Tonga were divested into a new title called Tu’i Ha’atakalaua while the Tu’I Tonga became more of a religious and ceremonial figure.

Historians are unsure of the veracity of the revenge story, but it describes a known reassertion of control of the Tongatapu chiefs over the island groups within the Tu’i Tonga empire at that time. Either Kau’ulufonuafekai or the new Tu’i Ha’atakalaua appointed powerful new governors for each of the main island groups. Mata’uvave received the dominion of Ha’apai.

== Domination of Northern Ha’apai ==
The colorful early history of the Mata’uvave dynasty is based only on oral tradition and interpretation of place names, but archaeologist David V. Burley has found corroborating evidence in remnants of ceremonial mounds and fortresses. Oral tradition describes these events as though it all happened to one man, but historians suggest that the following events occurred over a longer period of time and by several title holders.

The Mata’uvave and his supporters initially settled in Hihifo on Lifuka island, where they forced Ha’apaians to build the large fortress of Velata. He worshipped the god Aloaaloa and his tract of land was known as Tamatuiume’e. From his base in Hihifo, the Mata’uvave conquered Foa island by destroying the fortress in Lotofoa. In league with “the cannibal chief Tahi Fisi,” he then defeated the powerful Ha’a Ngana chiefs who had power bases in ‘Uiha and Kauvai Islands.

The Mata’uvave moved with his supporters to ‘Uiha island and ruled over the more populated Lifuka and Foa Islands to the north. As a Mata’uvave title holder in the 1920s told, “Mata’uvave went to live in U’oleva island. If he wanted to let the people know that he was going to give a command (fono) he would send someone to the north shore of Uoleva to remove his garment and expose his buttocks. Then the people in Lifuka would know that the governor was going to give a command as to certain work to be done. If the signal were given in the afternoon, the people assembled that evening in Uoleva. When a chief’s grave was to be dug or a pigeon mound to be erected sufficient labor was obtained for the earth to be dug and the mound formed in the night. In the morning the mound (sea) would be already made.”

The Mata’uvave ordered the people of Lifuka to build many monuments either for himself of for other chiefs to project status and power. Most of these structures were mounds for pigeon snaring, which was a sport reserved only for chiefs but required substantial investments of plebeian labor. There are pigeon snaring mounds associated with Mata’uvave on Lofanga, Ha’ano, Nukunamo, Tatafa, and Uoleva islands. Uoleva has ten pigeons mounds, including one named Siaulufotu, the largest such mound in all of Tonga. He also had constructed adjacent to Siaulufotu a freshwater bathing well named Vaisio’ata.

Between Uoleva and Lifuka islands is a shallow reef that was then and is still now walkable during low time. Oral tradition tells that after a daughter of the Mata’uvave, Tahilakifue, “hurt herself by falling on a rock trying to cross the exposed reef from Uoleva to Lifuka, Mata’uvave had the people clear a path between the two islands. Given the haughty nature of Tahilakifue, the area where she fell was named Foki’angatoma (toma meaning to dress pretentiously). The path is known as Ta’emaka, meaning to hew the stone.”

The first Mata’uvave is believed to have been buried in Nuanga, near present-day Pangai on Lifuka Island, but successive title holders were buried at Huluipaongo, also known as the Burial Mound of Mata’uvave. It is located at the southern tip of Lifuka island and is the highest mound on all of Lifuka. Tradition tells that it was constructed either from the clay used to wash hair as people walked from ‘Uoleva to Lifuka (after building the pigeon mounds) or that it was carried from nearby in baskets.

== Confrontation with Tongatapu ==
The title of Mata’uvave was created to instill a governor in Ha’apai who was subservient to the Tu’i Tonga and Tu’i Ha’atakalaua in Tongatapu. Over time, however, the Mata’uvave attempted to gain more autonomy. The only specific story is that he stopped sending tribute to the main island for the annual ‘inasi, or “first fruits” ceremony. To collect the tribute and institute a new gubernatorial regime on Ha’apai, the Tu’i Ha’atakalaua sent to Ha’apai three chiefs, collectively known as the ‘Otu Ha’apai. The Mata’uvave was stripped of much of his power and forced out of Uoleva and onto a small tract of land near the southern tip of Lifuka called Lakifue. The remaining Mata’uvave supporters were supposedly violent towards anyone encroaching on their last piece of property, and the road from Hihifo to Lakifue became known as, and is still known as, Halamate, or the “road of death.”

== The Mata’uvave of Recent Times ==
The Mata’uvave of 1920, who told many of these stories to Gifford during his collection of genealogical information, was Tuakimoana, who was appointed in 1870 by Kalaniuvalu, the son of Laufilitonga, the last Tu’i Tonga. “Tuakimoana informed Gifford that he had succeeded his mother’s brother Nehoa whose son and lineal descendant had died. Nehoa was preceded by his older brother Jacob who had replaced a man named Paul Fisilau. Since Tuakimoana, three additional Mata’uvave have been appointed – individuals bearing the personal names of Mano, Ma’u and Kavaliku. The last, Kavaliku, died in the mid-1980s without heir and the title is now vacant.”
