= Tatafa =

Tatafa Lighthouse
- Location: Tatafa, ʻUiha, Tonga
- Coordinates: 19°52′09″S 174°25′39″W

Tower
- Foundation: pile
- Power source: solar power

Light
- Focal height: 6 m (20 ft)
- Range: 5 nmi (9.3 km; 5.8 mi)
- Characteristic: Fl G 5s

Tatafa is an islet which belongs to ʻUiha island, Tonga. It is located within the Ha'apai Group.

== See also ==
- List of lighthouses in Tonga
- List of islands and towns in Tonga
