= Moʻungaʻone =

Island in Tonga

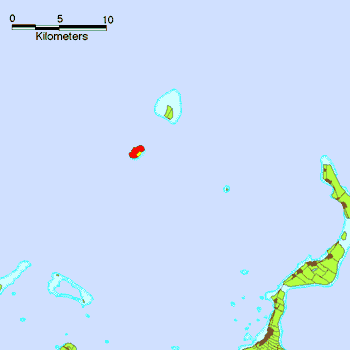
Location of Moʻungaʻone in the Haʻapai Islands

Moʻungaʻone is an island in Lifuka district, in the Haʻapai islands of Tonga. In 2006, it had a population of 136, and an area of 1.17 square kilometres (0.45 sq mi).

== See also ==
- List of cities in Tonga
