= Fotuhaʻa =

Island in Tonga

Coordinates: 19.812°S 174.719°W

Fotuhaʻa is an island in Lifuka district, in the Haʻapai islands of Tonga. As of 2020, the population is estimated at 100-150 and an area of 1.14 km^{2} (0.44 sq mi).

== See also ==
- List of cities in Tonga
