= Fetoa =

Island in Tonga

Coordinates: 19°57′55″S 174°43′33″W

Fetoa is an island in Lulunga district, in the Ha'apai group of islands of Tonga. The island is rocky, about 125 feet high, and separated from neighbouring Haafeva by a deep channel.
