= Matuku (Tonga) =

Island in Tonga

Coordinates: 19°57′34″S 174°44′46″W

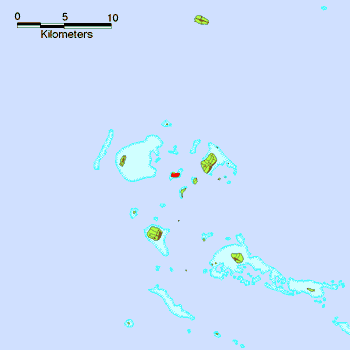
Location of Matuku Island in the Lulunga Islands

Matuku is a tiny island in Lulunga, a part of Haʻapai in Tonga. It is easily reached by outboard motorboat from the neighbouring hub of Haʻafeva and is on the course from there to the culturally important island of Kotu.

The main village is on the northwest side. It has a government primary school. A wharf is constructed on the east side, but it is never used.

The island had a population of 84 in 2021.
