= Ofolanga =

Island in Tonga

Coordinates: 19°35′57″S 174°27′13″W

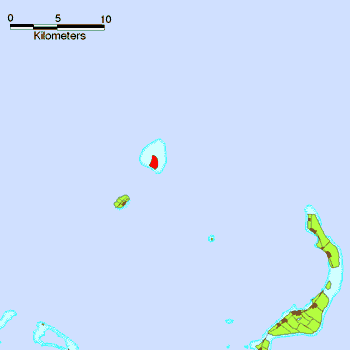
Location of Ofolanga in the Haʻapai Islands

Ofolanga is an island in Lifuka district, in the Haʻapai islands of Tonga. The island is nine miles west-northwest of Haʻano and is three quarters of a mile long and 75 yards wide, with a maximum elevation of 7 meters above sea level. It is surrounded by a barrier reef and lagoon.
