= Fakahiku =

Island in Tonga

Coordinates: 20.0428°S 174.7044°W

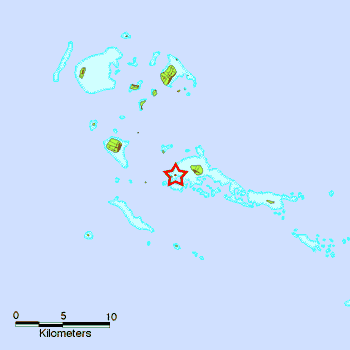
Location of Fakahiku in the Lulunga Islands

Fakahiku is an uninhabited island in Lulunga district, in the Ha'apai islands of Tonga. It is part of the ʻOʻua fisheries Special Management Area.
