= Taula (disambiguation) =

Taula is a type of prehistoric monument on Menorca that gets its name from the Catalan word for 'table',

Taula may also refer to:

- Taula (Tonga), an island in the Vava'u group of Tonga
- Durio graveolens or taula
- Taula, a village in Oncești Commune, Bacău County, Romania

== See also ==
- Tual (disambiguation)
- Tuala (disambiguation)
- Tualao, a town in Negros Oriental Province, the Philippines
- Tualeu, a village in West Timor, East Nusa Tenggara Province, Indonesia
