= Faletau =

Faletau is a Tongan surname. Notable people with the surname include:

- Kuli Faletau (born 1963), Tongan rugby union player
- Mapa Faletau (born 1967), Tongan noble, diplomat, and civil servant
- Sione Faletau (born 1988), Tongan rugby union player
- Taulupe Faletau (born 1990), Tongan-born Welsh rugby union player, son of Kuli
