= Luangahu =

Island in Tonga

Coordinates: 19°52′16″S 174°28′35″W

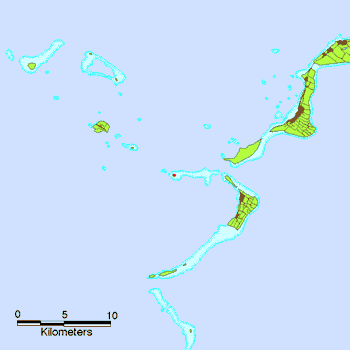
Location of Luangahu in the Ha'apai Islands

Luangahu is an island in Tonga. It is located within the Ha'apai Group in the centre of the country, to northeast of the national capital of Nukuʻalofa. The island is used as a fishing ground by the villagers of Lofanga.
