= Matuku =

Matuku may refer to:

- Matuku (bird), monotypic genus of a Miocene heron from New Zealand
- Matuku Island, Fiji
- Matuku (Tonga)
- Matuku-tangotango, monster in Māori mythology
- Māori language name for the Australasian bittern
