= Vaimalō =

- Village
- Nickname: Funga Mapitoa
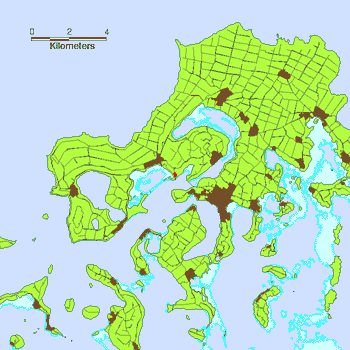
- map of Vaimalō

- Location within Tonga
- Coordinates: 18°37′58.80″S 174°0′0.00″W
- Country: Tonga
- District: Vava'u

Population (2021)
  - Total: 114
- Time zone: UTC+13

Vaimalō, is a village in the western district of Vavaʻu in Tonga. The population is 114.

== Naming ==
Vaimalō was named by one of the most revered and beloved chiefs in Vavaʻu's history, the great Finau Fisi. The village became the sole estate of his only child, Naufahu Mapilitoa. In 1781, right off the coast of Longomapu, it was Finau Fisi in his double-hulled war canoe, the Talito'a, who met the Spaniard explorer Don Francisco Antonio Mourelle, the first European to discover Vavaʻu. With his supplies depleted and sailing the last three days without water, it was by luck that Don Francisco Antonio Mourelle and his crew found the inlet passage to the middle of the main island. In his journal Don Francisco Antonio Mourelle wrote of the great size of the 10 double-hulled war canoes that encircled his ship as they anchored off the coast of Longomapu. The first thing the captain asked for when Finau Fisi met him was water. Upon understanding his request, Finau Fisi not only gave the explorer and his crew water but replenished their food supplies, took care of them, and stayed with them for the two weeks they spent in Vavaʻu. Don Francisco Antonio Mourelle kept thanking Finau Fisi in Spanish: "Gracias agua, gracias agua" (thank you water, thank you water), hence the Tongan translation and the name of the village "Vai - Water", "Malō - Thank you". Before the passage of the Vavaʻu Land Acts (V.L.A) of 1849 and 1914 that effectively placed Vaimalō under government control, the whole of Vaimalō belonged only to Naufahu Mapilitoa and his family. Vaimalō's current general population is made up mainly of Naufahu Mapilitoaʻs immediate descendants, relatives, and friends from Niue, Fiji, Samoa, and Solomon Islands.

== Naufahu Māpilitoa ==
Naufahu Māpilitoa was the only child of Luseane ʻI-fanga-Hihifo and the great chief Fīnau Fisi. Fīnau Fisi was the younger brother and chief advisor to the most feared and powerful man in all of Tonga in the late 18th and early 19th century, the infamous Vavaʻu King or Tu’i Vava’u Finau ʻUlukalala II, also known as Fangupō and Finau ʻUlukalala-‘i-Feletoa. Naufahu Māpilitoa was a mighty warrior of Vavaʻu and was renowned for his independent disposition, particularly his uncompromising and unrepentant opposition to the rule of his uncle and Vava’u King Finau ʻUlukalala II, whom he hated due to the King's cruel treatment of the common people. In 1807, Tu’i Vava’u Finau ʻUlukalala II was in the early stage of rebuilding and stabilizing Vava’u politically and socially after the bloody civil war between his forces and those of opposing Vava’u chiefs which ended when he unwillingly accepted a compromise with demands that favored the opposition. In that bloody civil war, Naufahu Mapilitoa opposed, broke away and fought bravely against his father and the King’s forces to great effect in Feletoa and Mataika. At the Fort Fatungakoa in Feletoa, it was Naufahu and the warrior Pupunu who threw the double spears that killed the King's giant chief warrior Siu'ulua. In the mound of Fekitetele in Mataika it was Naufahu and the warrior Fanafonua who slew his own father's twin Fijian chief warriors Koloiuluipuaka and Koloiloaloa, fighting with his famous war clubs Pasivulangi and Pasitaukei.

After the war Naufahu Māpilitoa returned to the land he made his home, Vaimalō. He started a family but even that did not stop him from voicing and making his hatred of his uncle the King known. This made him very popular with the common people but viewed by his father Fīnau Fisi and his uncle the King as not only unforgivably and deeply disrespectful but hindering lasting peace. This made Naufahu a very dangerous enemy in the eyes of the ruling monarch as he was looked up to as a leader by other chiefs and warriors who felt the same way.

For these reasons and with the blessing of his brother and chief advisor Fīnau Fisi, in 1808, the King concocted and carried out the sinking canoes incident off the coast of Makave. An act that made Finau ʻUlukalala II stood out as not only a cruel ruler but also a cunning strategist. With Finau Fisi absent, the highest-ranked and most influential opposing chiefs and warriors, including Naufahu, were invited to a great feast and royal kava ceremony hosted by the King in Makave. During the royal kava ceremony the king's warriors in overwhelming numbers suddenly attacked and subdued the seated opposing chiefs and warriors. Most were killed immediately where they sat, some were executed in different areas of the village and the highly ranked and mighty of warriors of which there were six were held down with their hands bound. The six were Naufahu, twins Talia’uli and Mahe'uli'uli, Ngāngāehau, Pupunukaetau, Fanafonua and they were soon joined by another fearsome warrior, the chief Kakahu, who refused the King's invitation but was betrayed by a close relative and captured at his home, which made it seven chiefs and warriors of the highest order. Of these seven only Fanafonua managed to break free and escaped; the remaining six were bound hands and feet, put into dilapidated, leaking canoes that sank right off the shore at Neiafutahi. However, this execution did not bring the peace the King sought for Vavaʻu; instead, it brought a division that lasted for 12 years. In 1820, the King's youngest son and reigning Vavaʻu King, the Tu'i Vavaʻu Finau ʻUlukalala IV or Tu'apasi and Finau ʻUlukalala-'i-Pouono, finally achieved peace and brought the whole island together with many of his father's old enemies as his advisors and members of his national council.

== A family estate ==
Naufahu Māpilitoa married Tulukava Siliika of Talau and they had one child, a son they named 'Avala-ʻae-tau. Upon Naufahuʻs death in 1808, Vaimalō became the family estate of 'Avala-ʻae-tau, his immediate family and a few relatives. ʻAvala-ʻae-tau married five times, which was normal in ancient times throughout Tonga, especially within the nobility class. His five wives bore him eleven children.

== Government took over the land ==
When His Majesty George Tupou I became Tu'i Vava'u, "Vava'u King", in 1833 after the death of Fīnau ʻUlukālala IV (Tuapasi), he ushered in a new political and social era in Vavaʻu that became the historic road-map and foundation for change in all of Tonga forever.

1. He abolished serfdom in Vavaʻu in 1835
2. He published the Vava'u Code the first written laws of Tonga in 1838
3. He dedicated and pledged Tonga to a Christian God and officially made Tonga a Christian kingdom in 1839
4. He established the Vavaʻu Land Act (V.L.A) of 1849 which empowered government to acquire land owned by chiefs and distribute them to commoners

When the V.L.A went into effect in 1849, His Majesty George Tupou I meticulously and cleverly persuaded countless Nobles or “ʻEiki” of Vavaʻu to accept the new V.L.A, especially those who stood to lose entire estates and land in accordance to the re-distribution ordinances of the new Vava'u Code. In exchange for the Nobles' acceptance and allegiance, His Majesty appointed the most influential of them to new governmental positions and bestowed upon some new aristocratic titles.

Such was His Majesty's appointment of a young Tevita Taʻofi-kae-tau Tapueluelu to become his Governor of Vavaʻu. This appointment is viewed by many as a clever measure that appeased and formed an iron-fist alliance with an influential, unpredictable and sometimes unruly Tapueluelu. The prestigious position and title with its implied significance did just that, Tapueluelu permanently moved out of Vaimalō and made Neiafu his new home, now the newly established and bustling capital city of Vavaʻu. Tapuelueluʻs new position and title came with a hereditary estate that Tapueluelu named Sailoame. Tapueluelu was not the only child of Avala-ʻae-tau that permanently moved out of Vaimalō. In 1878, Lesieli Afu Haʻapai married Siaosi ʻUlu-ki-vaiola who was the 6th Tuita, and made ʻUtungake, Vavaʻu her new home.

== Muileleu and Mohe-mo-langa ==
When the two eldest children of 'Avala-ʻae-tau moved out of Vaimalō, the two remaining, Lavinia Sialehaehae and Salesi Matele-ʻo-Haʻamea, decided to divide Vaimalō into two separate Estates. Lavinia Sialehaehae made the whole oceanfront part of Vaimalō her home and named it Muileleu or Mourelle after the Spanish explorer Francisco Antonio Mourelle, the first European to discover Vavaʻu. Salesi Mataele-ʻo-Haʻamea took over the inland part of Vaimalō and named his home Mohe-mo-langa.

Lavinia Sialehaehae was barren and did not have any children, so upon her death, Salesi Mataele-ʻo-Haʻamea became the sole “hereditary occupant” of Vaimalō. Soon thereafter, he gave his inland home of Mohe-mo-langa to Manase Manu'okafoa, a relative, and moved into Laviniaʻs oceanfront home of Muileleu. Salesi had only one child, a son named Salesi Kato-ki-moʻunga Tuʻipulotu, whose great-grandchildren are the occupants of Muileleu, Mohe-mo-langa, and most of Vaimalō today.

== Funga Mapitoa ==
Vaimalōʻs nickname is Funga Mapitoa. Mapitoa is a massive rock that protrudes out of the ocean and is only five meters or so away from the tail end of Vaimalōʻs landmass, right in front of Muileleu. This rock was so named “Mapitoa”, short for “Mapilitoa”, by His Majesty George Tupou I, as a tribute to Vaimalōʻs original renowned resident Naufahu Mapilitoa.
