= Foua =

Island in Tonga

Coordinates: 20°00′11″S 174°44′32″W

Foua is an island in Lulunga district, in the Ha'apai islands of Tonga. The island is small and rocky and approximately 30 feet high.
