= Luahoko =

Island in Tonga

Coordinates: 19°40′17″S 174°23′39″W

Luahoko is an island in Tonga. It is located within the Ha'apai Group in the centre of the country, to northeast of the national capital of Nukuʻalofa.
