= Putuputua =

Island in Haʻapai, Tonga

Coordinates: 19°54′40″S 174°45′18″W

Putuputua is an island in Lulunga district, in the Ha'apai islands of Tonga.
