= Lekeleka =

Island in Tonga

Coordinates: 20.069°S 174.605°W

Lekeleka is an island in Lulunga district, in the Haʻapai islands of Tonga.
