= Pikula =

Pikula or Pikuła is the surname of the following people:

- Chris Pikula, American gamer
- Dejan Pikula (born 1969), Serbian chess player
- Joe Pikula (1944–2015), Canadian football player
- Monika Pikuła (born 1980), Polish actress
- Rob Pikula (born 1981), Canadian football player

== See also ==
- Jonah Justin Pikulas, Malagasy politician
