= Luanamo =

Island in Ha'apai, Tonga

Coordinates: 20.022°S 174.714°W

Luanamo is an island in Lulunga district, in the Ha'apai islands of Tonga.

On December 16, 2011, a fisherman died at the island while searching for sea cucumbers.
