= Tuala =

Tuala may refer to:

== Surname ==
- Ahsee Tuala, Samoan rugby player
- Enari Tuala, Australian rugby league player
- Tafaoimalo Leilani Tuala-Warren, Samoan judge

== Given name ==
- Aveau Tuala Lepale Niko Faitala Palamo, Samoan politician
- Tuala, a fictional character in The Bridei Chronicles
- Tuala Ainiu Iusitino (1936–2010), Samoan politician
- Tuala Falani Chan Tung, Samoan ambassador to Belgium
- Tuala Falenaoti Tiresa Malietoa, Samoan politician and educator
- Tuala Mathew M. Vaea, Samoan rugby player

== Other uses ==
- Tuala, or taula, a name for Durio graveolens among the Kenyah and Dayak peoples
- Tuala, a township in Ongata Rongai, Kenya
- Tuala, a village in Moxico Province, Angola

== See also ==
- Tual (disambiguation)
- Taula (disambiguation)
