= Nukunamo =

Uninhabited islet of Tonga

Coordinates: 19.715°S 174.273°W

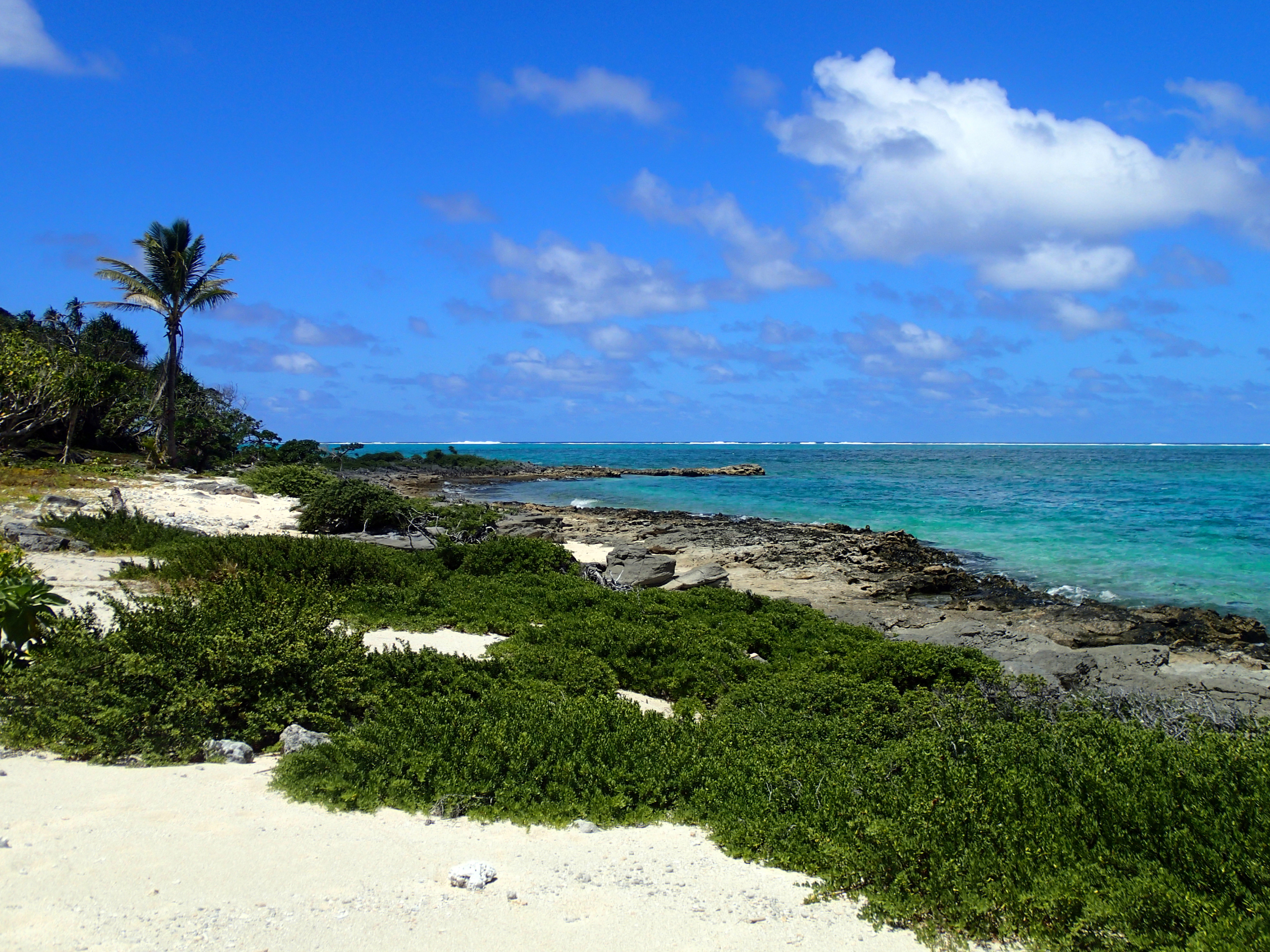

Nukunamo is an islet which belongs to Foa island, Tonga. It is located within the Ha'apai Group.
