= Meama =

Island in the Ha'apai Group, Tonga

Coordinates: 19°45′21″S 174°33′49″W

Meama is an island in Tonga. It is located within the Haʻapai Group in the centre of the country, to northeast of the national capital of Nukuʻalofa.
