= Uoleva =

Island in Tonga

Coordinates: 19°50′56″S 174°24′16″W

Uoleva is a sand-cay island in Lifuka district, in the Ha'apai islands of Tonga. Almost uninhabited, it is known for its five small resorts and clean, quiet beaches.

== Resort island ==
Uoleva is known for its five small resorts: Diana Beach resort, Sea Change Eco Retreat, Fanifo Lofa, and Serenity Beach. They are each capable of hosting perhaps two dozen guests each, but attendance is usually lower. Each is located on the west, leeward side of the island.

Besides the resort owners and their guests, the island is uninhabited. Only Serenity and Kitesurf Tonga live there permanently. The other resorts come with the whales

== Infrastructure ==
There are no roads on Uoleva. There are no cell phone towers, but it is within range of the towers on Lifuka or ‘Uiha. Electricity is only generated by small-scale solar panels. Water is available only from rainwater collection tanks.

== Transportation ==
Uoleva can be reached by boat or by foot. The reef between the north tip of Uoleva and the south tip of Lifuka is shallow enough at low tide to ford with a 30-minute strenuous walk. The water is usually at knee height but can rise to waist level depending on where one walks. A path is clearly visible through most of it but the terrain changes after each major storm. Tongans from Lifuka sometimes ride horses across this reef to visit their plantations on Uoleva.

Uoleva is most often reached by boat. Services can be arranged by the resort owners or by several foreign operators in Pangai.

== History ==
There has been no known permanent settlement on Uoleva. When the first Lapita settlers arrived on Tonga in approximately 2850 B.P. (900 BCE), the sea level was 2 metres (6.6 feet) higher than it is today, making it a much smaller island. Early Tongans lived instead on the larger raised limestone islands or ‘Uiha, Lifuka, Foa, and Ha’ano.

In the fifteenth century, the new Mata’uvave line of chiefs began constructing many pigeon-snaring mounds around northern Ha’apai. They built at least eight on Uoleva alone and can still be seen today scattered around the island's interior. Located in the center of Uoleva is the largest such mound in all of Tonga, named Siaulufotu. It was the personal mound of the Mata’uvave. Adjacent to the pigeon mound was the chief's freshwater bathing well, vaisioata.
