= Hakauata =

Hakuata Island Lighthouse
- Location: Hakuata Island; Haʻapai; Tonga
- Coordinates: 19°50′42.3″S 174°31′13.3″W

Tower
- Construction: metal skeletal tower
- Height: 9 metres (30 ft)
- Shape: square pyramidal skeletal tower
- Power source: solar power

Light
- Focal height: 12 metres (39 ft)
- Range: 10 nautical miles (19 km; 12 mi)
- Characteristic: Fl W 10s.

Hakauata is an island in Tonga. It is located within the Ha'apai Group in the center of the country, to northeast of the national capital of Nukuʻalofa.

== See also ==
- List of lighthouses in Tonga
