= Haʻatoʻu =

Settlement in Lifuka, Tonga

Coordinates: 19.811°S 174.350°W

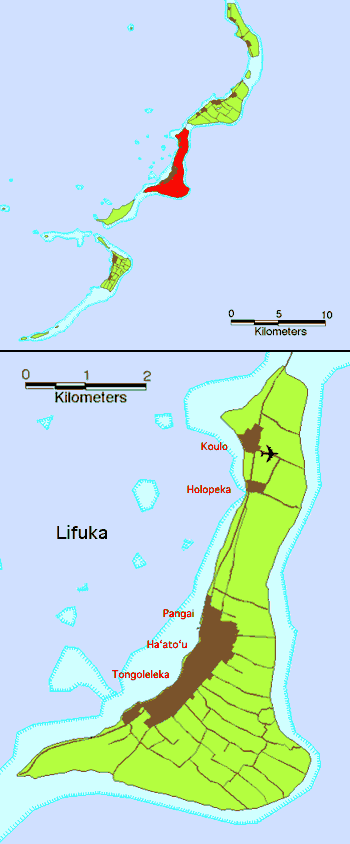
Haʻatoʻu location in Lifuka Island

Haʻatoʻu is a settlement in Lifuka island, Tonga.

== See also ==
- List of islands and towns in Tonga
