= Fatumanongi =

Island in Tonga

Coordinates: 19.769°S 174.731°W

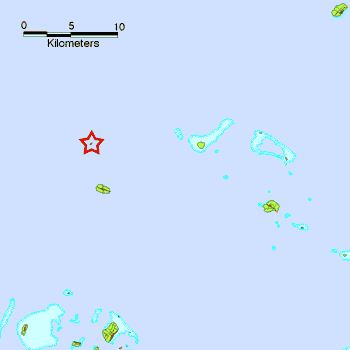
Map of the Fatumanongi Island region

Fatamanongi is an island in Tonga. It is located within the Ha'apai Group in the centre of the country, to the northeast of the national capital of Nukuʻalofa.

== Geography ==
The nearest islands are Fotuha'a to the south and Niniva to the east. The island of Kao lies to the west, and the Ava Tauoifi Strait lies to the south.

== Climate ==
The climate is hot like typical tropical areas. Like the other islands of the Ha'apai Group, Fatumanongi is occasionally hit by cyclones.
