= Pepea =

Island in Tonga

Coordinates: 20.045°S 174.705°W

Pepea is an island in Lulunga district, in the Ha'apai islands of Tonga.
