= Niniva =

Island in Tonga

Coordinates: 19°46′06″S 174°37′24″W

Niniva is an island in Lifuka district, in the Haʻapai islands of Tonga. The island is 26m high.
