= Kito (Tonga) =

Kito Island Lighthouse
- Location: Kito, Haʻapai district, Tonga
- Coordinates: 19°59′43″S 174°47′15″W

Tower
- Construction: metal
- Height: 9 m (30 ft)
- Shape: square skeletal tower
- Power source: solar power

Light
- Focal height: 12 m (39 ft)
- Range: 10 nmi (19 km; 12 mi)
- Characteristic: Q(3) W 10s

Kito is an island in the Lulunga district, part of the Ha'apai islands of Tonga.

== See also ==
- List of lighthouses in Tonga
