= Nukupule =

Island of Tonga

Coordinates: 19°46′46″S 174°32′12″W

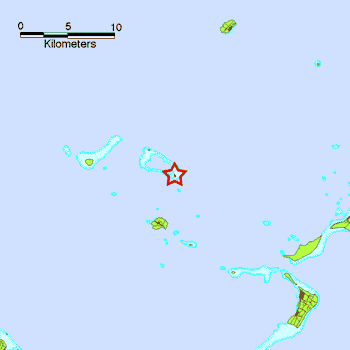
Location in Tonga

Nukupule Island is an island in Lifuka district, in the Haʻapai islands of Tonga. The island is approximately 12 miles (19 km) west of the main island of Lifuka.

The island itself is approximately 6 acres (2 hectares) and has its own reef system surrounding most of the island with only a few deep channels for access into its own natural lagoon.

There are very few animals (if any) on Nukupule Island although it is surrounded by deep water reefs which are home to an abundance of fish. Humpback Whales with their newborn calves visit from July to October.
