= List of lighthouses in Tonga =

This is a list of lighthouses in Tonga.

== Lighthouses ==
Name	Image	Year built	Location & coordinates	Class of light	Focal height	NGA number	Admiralty number	Range nml
Foiata Lighthouse		n/a	Vavaʻu; 18°42′59.1″S 174°08′11.6″W	Q (3) W 10s.	59 metres (194 ft)	3180	K4624	10
Hakuata Island Lighthouse		n/a	Hakauata; 19°50′42.3″S 174°31′13.3″W	Fl W 10s.	12 metres (39 ft)	3194.2	K4636	10
Kito Island Lighthouse		n/a	Kito; 19°59′43.2″S 174°47′14.6″W	Q (3) W 10s.	12 metres (39 ft)	3198.5	K4638.5	10
Malinoa Range Front Lighthouse		n/a	Tongatapu; 21°01′53.6″S 175°07′55.5″W	Q W	6 metres (20 ft)	3215	K4644.5	7
Malinoa Range Rear Lighthouse	Image	n/a	Tongatapu; 21°02′14.1″S 175°07′44.3″W	Iso W 6s.	15 metres (49 ft)	3216	K4644.51	8
Muifuiva Lighthouse		n/a	offshore Nomuka; 20°16′07.8″S 174°49′03.6″W	Fl (2) W 10s.	15 metres (49 ft)	3208	K4640	10
Muitoa Point Lighthouse		n/a	Haʻano; 19°38′49.8″S 174°17′49.8″W	Fl (2) W 10s.	12 metres (39 ft)	3182	K4628	10
Nukulai Island Lighthouse		n/a	Nukulai Island; 20°03′02.1″S 174°44′03.2″W	Oc WRG 7s.	24 metres (79 ft)	3200	K4639	8
Ohonua Lighthouse		n/a	ʻEua; 21°20′24.0″S 174°57′18.0″W	Oc R 4s.	n/a	3245	K4654.7	10
Tatafa Lighthouse		n/a	Tatafa; 19°52′09.2″S 174°25′38.8″W	Fl G 5s.	6 metres (20 ft)	3194.6	K4636.5	5
The Narrows Range Front Lighthouse	Image	n/a	Tongatapu; 21°04′59.6″S 175°09′20.3″W	V Q W	5 metres (16 ft)	3235	K4651.5	4
The Narrows Range Rear Lighthouse		n/a	Tongatapu; 21°05′02.3″S 175°09′16.0″W	Iso W 4s.	11 metres (36 ft)	3235.5	K4651.51	4
Tokulu Island Lighthouse		n/a	Tokulu; 20°06′06.5″S 174°47′27.5″W	Fl W 3s.	12 metres (39 ft)	3204	K4639.5	10

== See also ==
- Lists of lighthouses and lightvessels
