= Lofanga =

Island in Tonga

Coordinates: 19°49′33″S 174°33′06″W

Lofanga is an island in Tonga. It is located within the Ha'apai Group in the centre of the country, to northeast of the national capital of Nukuʻalofa. The island had a population of 137 at 2016, and an area of 1.45 km^{2}.

== See also ==
- List of cities in Tonga
