= Limu (Haʻapai) =

Island in Tonga

Coordinates: 20°1′15″S 174°27′30″W

Limu is an island in Tonga. It is located within the Ha'apai Group in the centre of the country, to northeast of the national capital of Nukuʻalofa.
