= Tual (disambiguation) =

Tual is a city in Maluku Province, Indonesia.

Tual may also refer to:

- Tual, Paglat, Maguindanao del Sur, Philippines
- Tual, Picong, Lanao del Sur, Philippines
- Tual, President Quirino, Sultan Kudarat, Philippines
- An alternative name for Saint Tudwal (died c. 564)
- Gabriel Tual (born 1998), French middle-distance runner
- Roland Tual (1902–1956), French director and producer

== See also ==
- Taula (disambiguation)
- Tuala (disambiguation)
