= Fonuaika =

Island in Lulunga, Ha'apai, Tonga

Coordinates: 20.1106°S 174.7021°W

Fonuaika is an island in Lulunga district, in the Ha'apai islands of Tonga.
