= Tongoleleka =

Settlement in Lifuka island, Tonga

Coordinates: 19.816°S 174.353°W

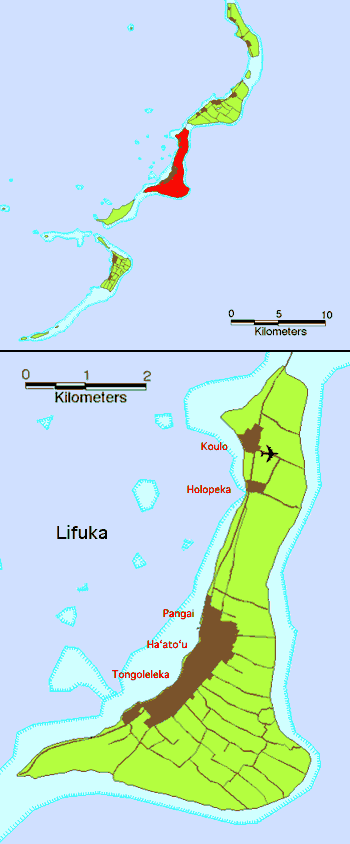
Tongoleleka location in Lifuka Island

Tongoleleka is a settlement in Lifuka island, Tonga.

== See also ==
- List of islands and towns in Tonga
