= ʻUtulau =

- Coordinates: 21.190°S 175.269°W
- Country: Tonga
- Island: Tongatapu

ʻUtulau is a village on the western district of Tongatapu, Tonga. It is one of the estates of Crown Prince Tupoutoʻa, the heir to the Tongan throne. The traditional chief of the village is Tau'atevalu. Tupouto'a has several talking chiefs from 'Utulau namely To'amalekini, Manukainiu as well as a few others.

== Location ==
In the western district of the island of Tongatapu, Kingdom of Tonga. It is next to the village of Haʻalalo.

== Village Nicknames (Hingoa Fakatenetene) ==
Alafolau Heavula

The name Alafolau Heavula is one of the nickname of the village. The heavula was a kind of tree that lined up the sides of one of the road in the village. These trees grew and somehow formed an archway (alafolau), like a guard of honour, along the road all the way to the Houma 'Utulau.

Toa Fakaʻamu

Story goes that a church minister went to Kolovai one Sunday to attend a sermon there, and he was fascinated with the toa trees lining up the road. He wished that it would be great to have such trees back at ʻUtulau.

After the sermon, he went back on his horse and chariot, only to find a toa tree where the Vaolongolongo cemetery is now located.

That's how the name Toa Fakaʻamu is said to have originated.

== Landmarks (Mātanga) ==
Vai ko Pāʻehe

Vai ko Pāʻehe was a pool, although it has disappeared over the years.

It was said that the ʻUtulau spirits always gathered to the pool at midnight every night and enjoyed the coolness of the pool. It was said that you could hear them laughing and singing, especially if you lived near the pool.

== Churches ==
There are 4 main churches in ʻUtulau;

1. Free Wesleyan Church of Tonga
2. Free Church of Tonga
3. Catholic Church
4. Church of Jesus Christ of Latter-day Saints

== Photos ==
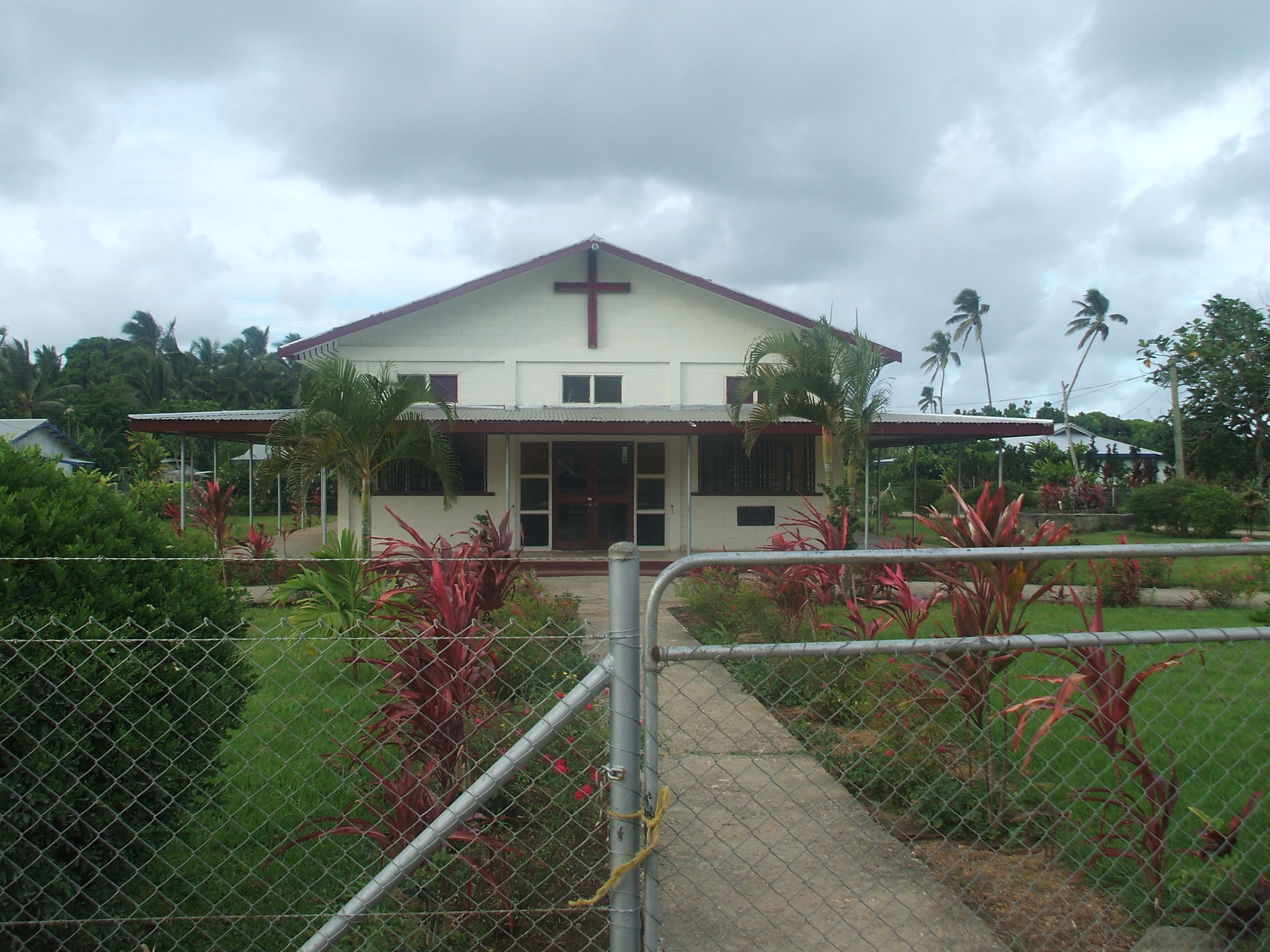
Wesleyan Church at 'Utulau
