= Jonah Justin Pikulas =

Malagasy politician

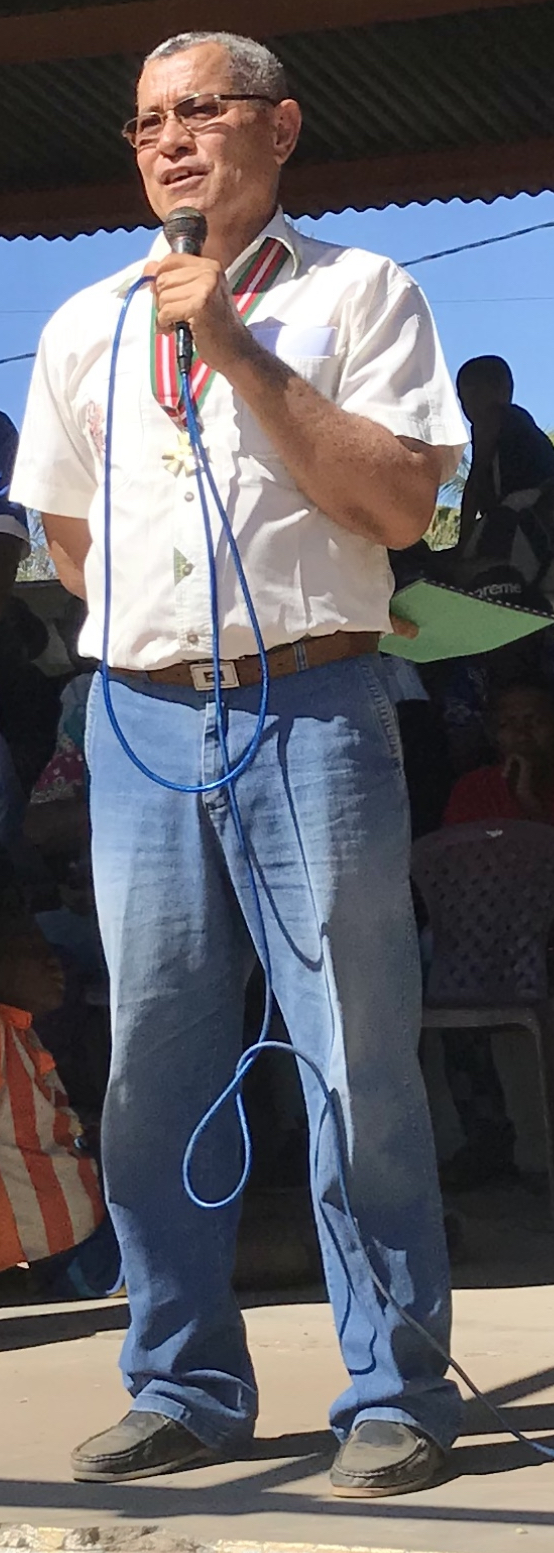

Jonah Justin Pikulas is a Malagasy politician. A member of the National Assembly of Madagascar, he was elected as an independent; he represents the constituency of Maintirano. Before 2006 he was the Chief of the Region of Melaky.
