= Vavaʻu Code =

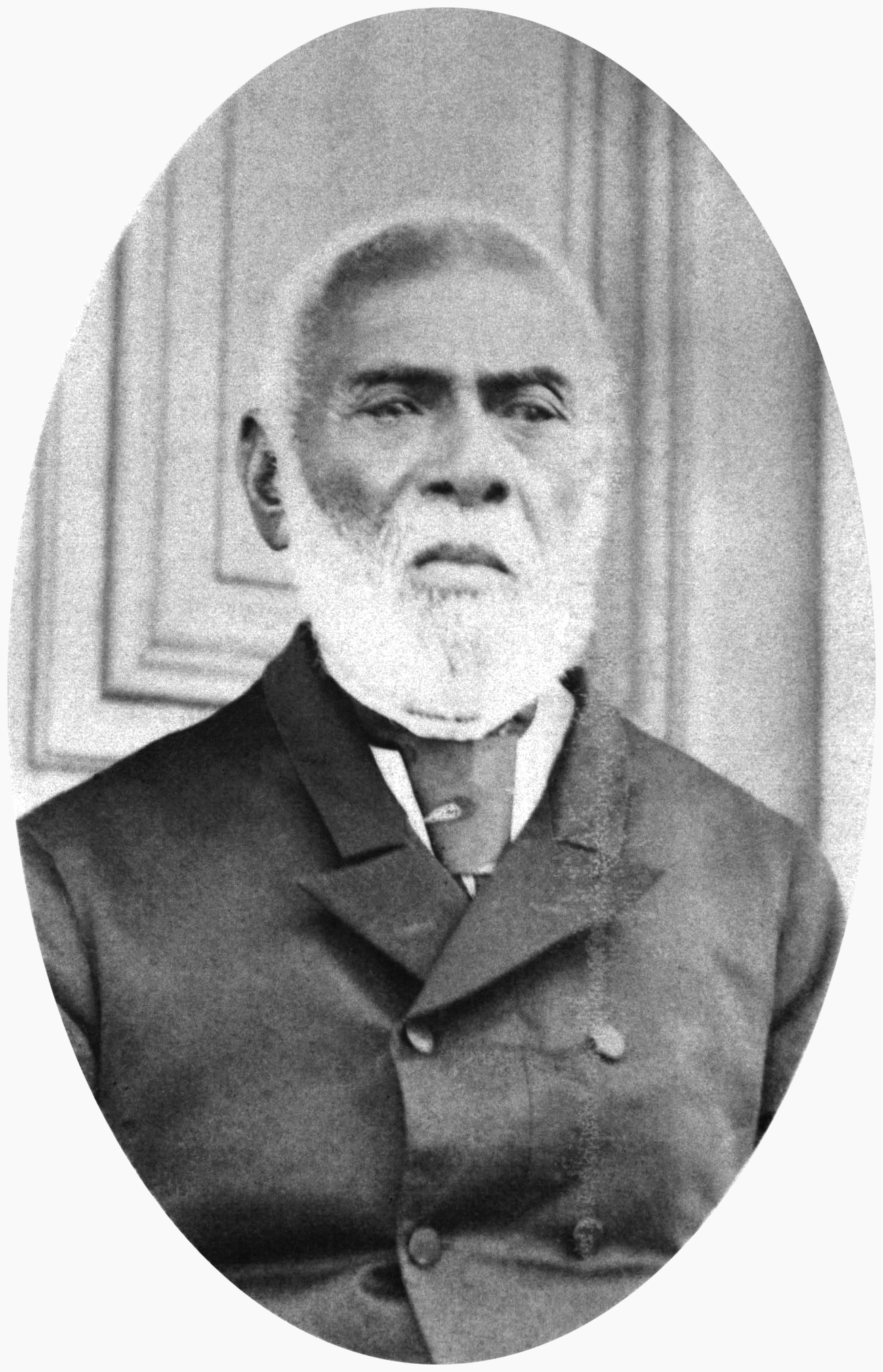

The Vavaʻu Code was instituted in Vavaʻu, Tonga in 1839, by King George Tupou I. It contained the country's first ever written laws, and formed the bases of the first constitution of the Kingdom. It delineated an ordered society where the monarch, chiefs, and subjects live in mutual obligation and also guaranteed the rights of the commoners for the first time. Along with the legal system it set up, the Code established the sovereign's intention creating a government "by law", one that is respected by the Europeans.

== Provisions ==
The Code instituted basic human rights and limited the power of chiefs over their subjects: chiefs no longer had the right of life and death over their people, nor could they seize agricultural produce. Furthermore, chiefs could now be put on trial like any other Tongan. In its first clause, it declared: "The laws of this our land prohibit - murder, theft, adultery, fornication and the retailing of the spirits". A later law would provide three months of hard labor as penalty for each of these offenses.

The Vavaʻu Code was strongly influenced by the George Tupou I's religious beliefs and was supported by the Methodist missionaries as the king was a convert. It banned traditional festivals seen by missionaries as encouraging sexual promiscuity. Circumcision, tattooing and alcohol drinking were also outlawed. A provision banning the practice of tattooing, for instance, declared that "it is not lawful to tatatau or kaukau or to perform any other idolatrous ceremonies" and that "if one does so, he will be judged and punished and fined for so doing". Sundays became a compulsory day off work, to encourage Tongans to worship the Christian God. Religion was also seen as a unifying factor that would help the king cement his position. The Code was able to demonstrate its benefits after the conversion of the heathen chieftains.

The Vavaʻu Code was followed and completed by further laws, including a second Code in 1850 forbidding the sale of land to foreigners and proclaiming Tupou as supreme leader of Tonga.

== Sources ==
- Huffer, Elise, Grands Hommes et Petites Îles: La Politique Extérieure de Fidji, de Tonga et du Vanuatu, Paris: Orstom, 1993, ISBN 2-7099-1125-6
