= Holopeka =

Settlement in Lifuka island, Tonga

Coordinates: 19.784°S 174.341°W

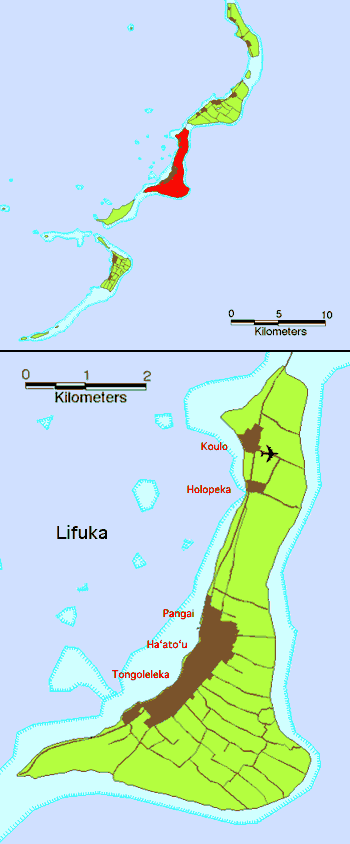
Holopeka location in Lifuka Island

Holopeka is a settlement in Lifuka island, Tonga. The population is 132.

Holopeka met international acclaim in the mid-1990s, as the ancestral home of New Zealand rugby player Jonah Lomu. Lomu came to be regarded as one of the greatest rugby players of all time.
