= Angaha (ʻEua) =

- Village
- Interactive map of Angaha
- Coordinates: 21.362°S 174.957°W
- Country: Tonga
- District: ʻEua

Population (2021)
  - Total: 364
- Time zone: UTC+13:00

Angahā is a village on the island of ʻEua in Tonga. It is located on the western side of the island. The population is 364. The village was built in 1948 by people from Niuafoʻou who had been relocated to ʻEua after a volcanic eruption. It is named after Angahā, the chief village of Niuafoʻou.
