= Two Branch Island =

River island of the Mississippi River, U.S.

Coordinates: 38.875°N 90.606°W

Two Branch Island is an island in the Mississippi River. The island is entirely within St. Charles County, Missouri.

The island most likely was so named on account of its location between two tributaries of the Mississippi River.
