= Faioa =

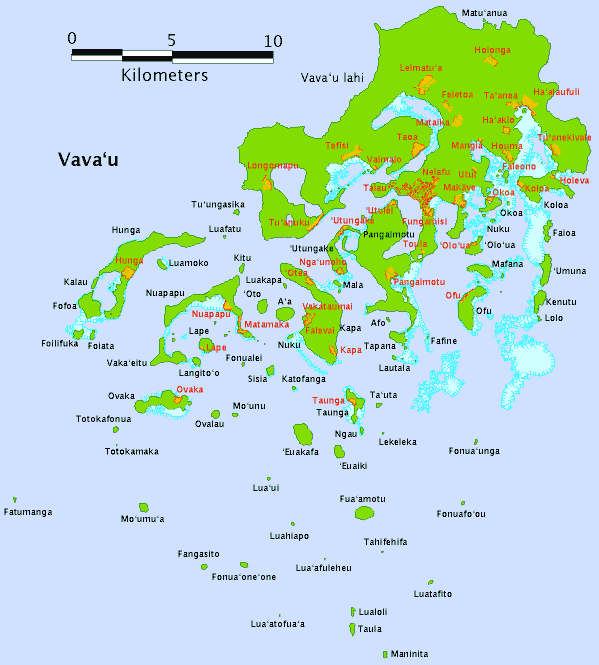
- Interactive map of Faioa

Geography
- Location: South Pacific
- Coordinates: 18.66527°S 173.92293°W
- Archipelago: Vava'u Group
- Area: 0.68 km^{2} (0.26 sq mi)
- Length: 1.0 km (0.62 mi)
- Width: 0.25 km (0.155 mi)
- Highest elevation: 17 m (56 ft)

Administration
- Tonga
- Division: Vava'u District

Demographics
- Population: 0

Faioa is an uninhabitated island in the Kingdom of Tonga. It is located within the Vava'u Group in the far north of the country.

== Geography ==
The island lies 3.1 kilometers from the main island of Vava'u. Faioa is one kilometer long, 250 meters wide, and has a height of 17 meters. Nearby are the islands of Umuna, Kenutu, Nuku, and Oloua.

The landform consists of elevated coral limestone, situated alongside adjacent coastal reef networks and overwash deposits. The island is low and covered with cocoa-nuts.

== Population ==
While the island has no permanent population, it is frequently used for holiday rentals, private retreats, and recreational boating excursions.

== Climate ==
Vava'u is the wettest part of the whole Tongan group. The climate is tropically hot, but moderated by constant winds. Like the other islands of the Vavaʻu group, Faioa is occasionally hit by cyclones.
