= ʻOʻua =

Island in Tonga

Coordinates: 20.038°S 174.679°W

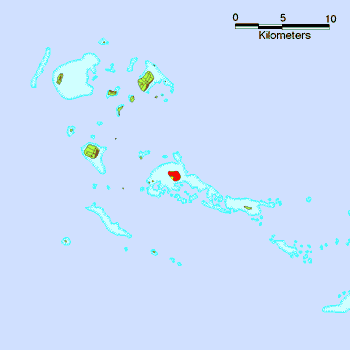
Location of ʻOʻua in the Lulunga Islands

ʻOʻua is an island in Lulunga district, in the Haʻapai islands of Tonga. The population is 45.
