= Kenutu =

Island in Tonga

Coordinates: 18.6940°S 173.9270°W

Kenutu is a privately owned island of the coast of Vava'u Island that belongs to the Afuha’amango Family.

== Owners ==
This island is owned by the Afuha'amango family. Afuha'amango was gifted the island as a token of appreciation from the King of Tonga after he led him to victory in his many battles across the kingdom. Currently, the island is uninhabited but locals from neighbouring islands visit Kenutu.

== Neighbor islands ==
The neighboring islands are Umuna, Faioa, as well as smaller islets such as Lolo and Mafana.
