= Koulo =

Settlement in Tonga

Coordinates: 19.777°S 174.341°W

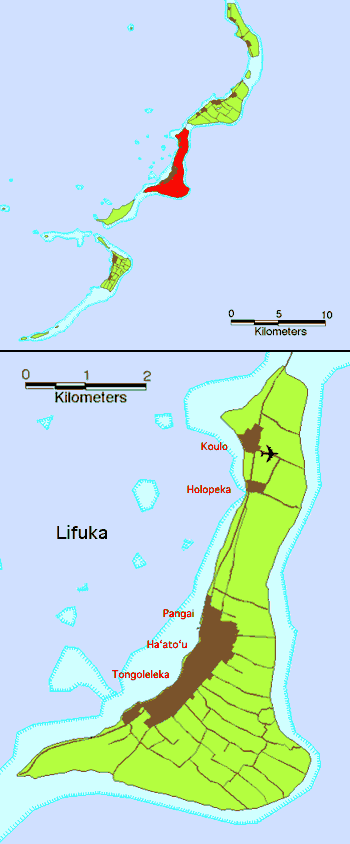
Koulo location in Lifuka Island

Koulo is a settlement in the north-west area of Lifuka island, Tonga. The population is 171.
