= Nukulei =

Island in Tonga

Coordinates: 20.052672°S 174.734212°W

Nukulei is an island in Lulunga district, in the Ha'apai islands of Tonga. Nukulei has a length of 0.73 kilometres.
