= Fukave =

Islet near Tongatapu, Tonga

Coordinates: 21°05′34″S 175°01′52″W

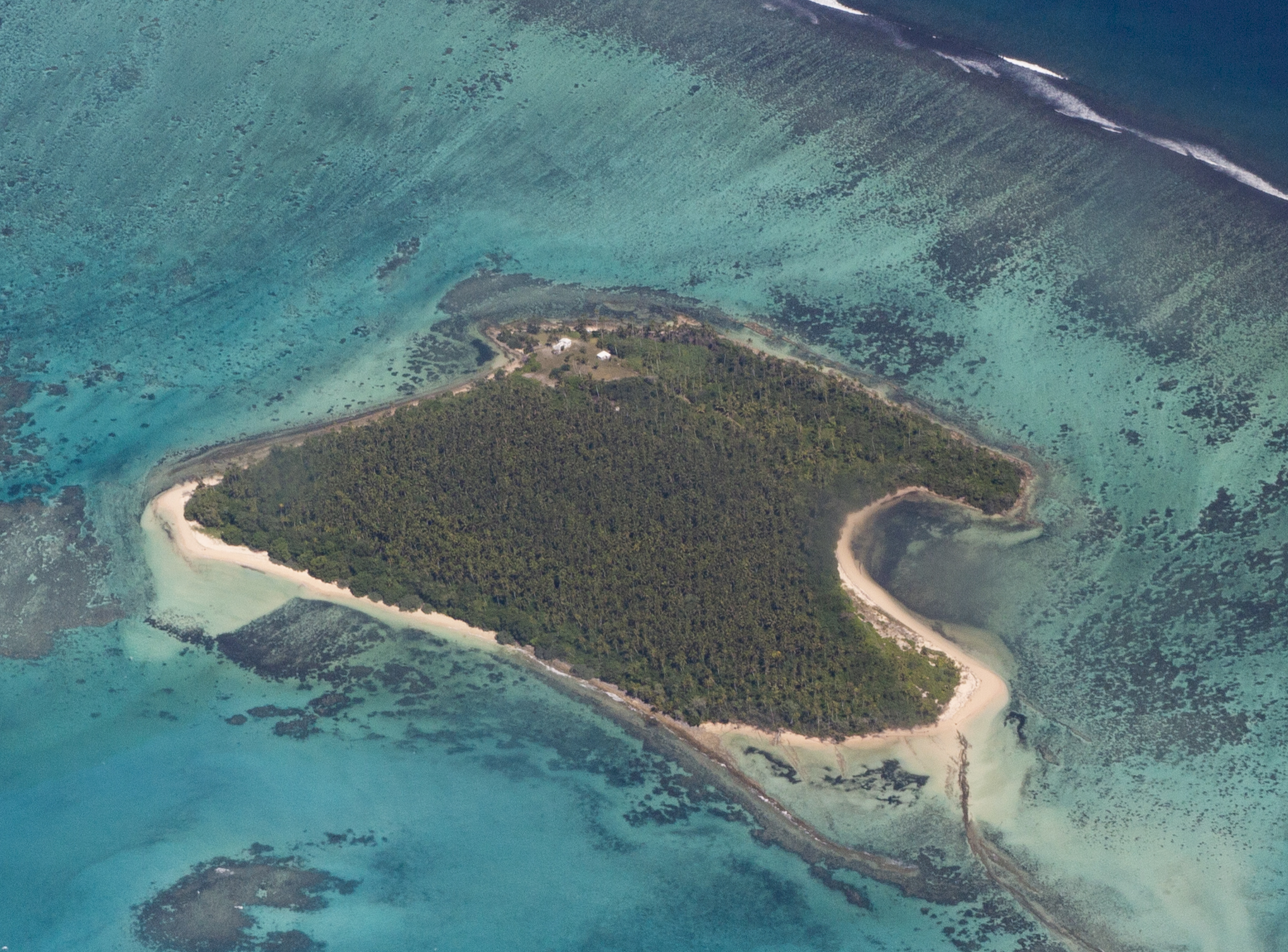
An aerial view of Fukave Island.

Fukave is an island in Tonga, off the coast of Tongatapu.
