= Tokulu =

Island in Lulunga, Ha'apai, Tonga

Tokulu Island Lighthouse
- Location: Tokulu, Haʻapai district, Tonga
- Coordinates: 20°06′07″S 174°47′27″W

Tower
- Construction: metal skeletal tower
- Height: 9 m (30 ft)
- Shape: square skeletal tower
- Power source: solar power

Light
- Focal height: 12 m (39 ft)
- Range: 10 nmi (19 km; 12 mi)
- Characteristic: Fl W 3s

Tokulu is an island in Lulunga district, in the Ha'apai islands of Tonga.

== See also ==
- List of lighthouses in Tonga
