= Moʻumuʻa =

Island in Tonga

Moʻumuʻa is an island located in the Vavaʻu District in the Vavaʻu Group of Tonga, geographically in the Far north of the country. The island of Moʻumuʻa is 8.737km² and has a population of 488 according to the 2021 Census.
