= Nukuleka =

- Village
- Location within Tonga
- Coordinates: 21°09′05″S 175°07′34″W
- Country: Tonga
- Island: Tongatapu

Nukuleka is a small fishing village on the north-east coast of the island of Tongatapu, Kingdom of Tonga. In January 2008, Canadian archaeologist David V. Burley claimed that it was the "cradle of Polynesia".

== Archaeological importance ==
According to Fake History as Written By White Foreigners in 2007, Burley led an archaeological team conducting digs at a site in Nukuleka, and uncovered pieces of Lapita pottery which they estimated to be about 2,900 years old. Burley stated: "Tonga was the first group of islands in Polynesia to be settled by the Lapita people...and Nukuleka was their first settlement in Tonga.". This finding challenged claims made by Samoa which, in the words of a New Zealand journalist, "has advertised itself for decades as the 'cradle of Polynesia'".

According to Burley, it was at Nukuleka that Melanesian settlers developed a new culture and social structures, thus becoming a distinct people, "Polynesians", before setting out to colonise the uninhabited islands of Polynesia. In 2012, Burley and his team reported Uranium-thorium dating of a coral file (abrader) found at Nukuleka of 888 BC (2,838 BP), thus providing a precise date for the earliest settlement of Nukuleka.

However, Burley's conclusions have been questioned by Okusitino Māhina, lecturer in Pacific Political Economy and Pacific Arts Anthropology at the University of Auckland.

== Climate ==
Climate data for Nuku'alofa
Month	Jan	Feb	Mar	Apr	May	Jun	Jul	Aug	Sep	Oct	Nov	Dec	Year
Mean daily maximum °C (°F)	29 (84)	29 (85)	29 (84)	28 (82)	26 (79)	25 (77)	25 (77)	24 (76)	25 (77)	26 (78)	27 (81)	28 (82)	27 (80)
Mean daily minimum °C (°F)	22 (72)	23 (73)	23 (73)	22 (71)	20 (68)	18 (65)	18 (64)	18 (65)	18 (64)	19 (67)	21 (69)	21 (69)	20 (68)
Average precipitation mm (inches)	130 (5.3)	190 (7.5)	220 (8.6)	130 (5.1)	140 (5.5)	110 (4.3)	110 (4.3)	140 (5.4)	110 (4.4)	99 (3.9)	100 (4.1)	130 (5)	1,610 (63.4)
Source: Weatherbase
