= Teaupa =

Island in Haʻapai, Tonga

Coordinates: 19.976°S 174.736°W

Teaupa is an island in Lulunga district, in the Ha'apai islands of Tonga.
