= Kapeta =

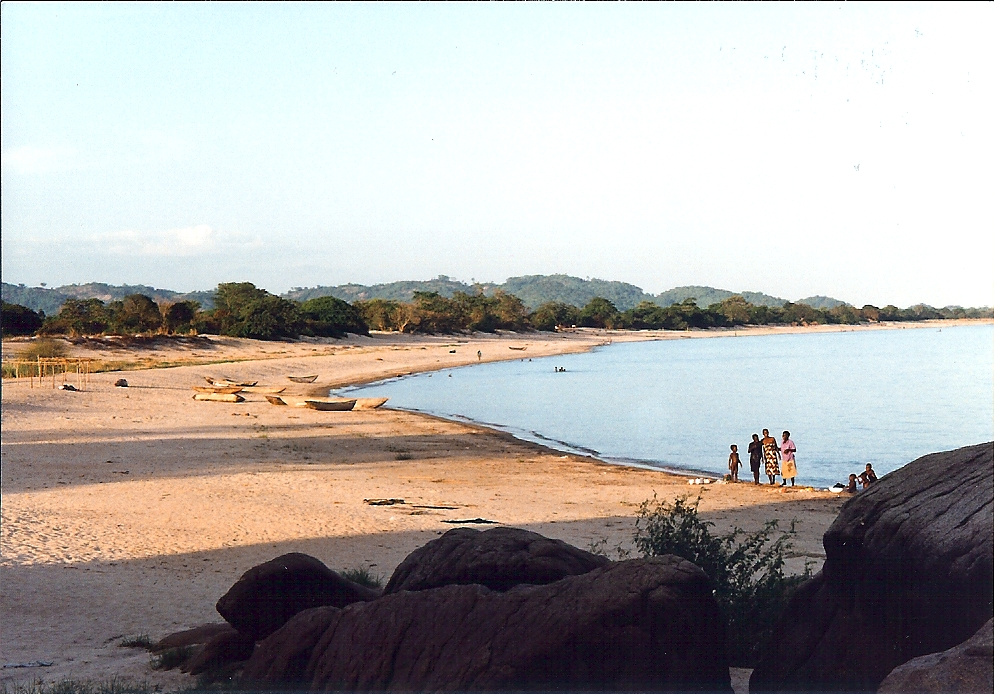
- Kapeta is located only 2 miles (3 km) north of Nkhotakota

- Location in Malawi
- Coordinates: 12°53′S 34°18′E
- Country: Malawi
- Region: Central Region
- District: Salima District

Kapeta is a village in central Malawi on Lake Malawi. It is Moin Salima District in the Central Region approximately 3 kilometres (2 mi) north of Nkhotakota.
