= Hakaufasi =

Island in Tonga

Coordinates: 19°01′06″S 174°00′32″W

Hakaufasi is sand cay in Tonga. It is located within the Vava'u Group in the far north of the country.
