= Tungua =

Island in Tonga

Coordinates: 20.016°S 174.764°W

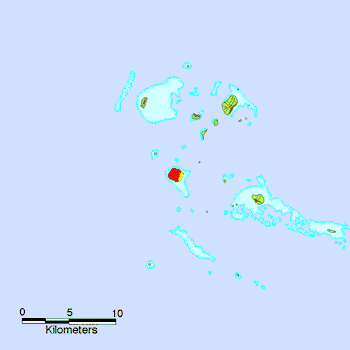
Location of Tungua in the Lulunga Islands

Tungua is an island in Lulunga district, in the Ha'apai islands of Tonga. The island had a population of 187 in 2016.
