= 'Umuna =

Island in Tonga

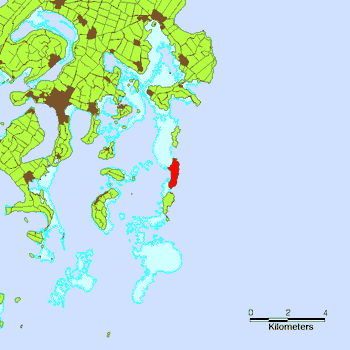
- Interactive map of 'Umuna

Geography
- Location: South Pacific
- Coordinates: 18.680°S 173.924°W
- Archipelago: Vava'u Group
- Area: 0.9052 km^{2} (0.3495 sq mi)
- Highest elevation: 38 m (125 ft)

Administration
- Tonga
- Division: Vava'u District

ʻUmuna (also spelled Umuna) is a small private island located in the Vava'u Group of the Kingdom of Tonga in the South Pacific Ocean.

The island is used primarily for tourism activities including kayaking, camping, and diving.

== Geography ==
ʻUmuna island is located in the Vava'u archipelago. The island has an elevation of approximately 38 metres above sea level.

The island is located approximately 7 kilometres southeast of Neiafu, the second-largest town in Tonga and the main urban center of the Vava'u.

The national capital, Nukuʻalofa, is located approximately 305 kilometres to the southwest, on the island of Tongatapu.

ʻUmuna Island is part of the Vavaʻu District, one of the administrative divisions of Tonga.

== Tourism ==
ʻUmuna Island operates as a private island resort offering various recreational activities. The island is known for kayaking and camping experiences, with visitors able to paddle through peaceful mangrove waterways surrounded by lush greenery and calm waters. The island is also associated with diving operations. There is also an interesting cave there.

== Nearby islands ==
Several other islands are located in the vicinity of ʻUmuna, including Kenutu and Faioa, as well as smaller islets such as Lolo, Mafana (located 3½ km west), and Nuku (located 3½ km northwest).

== Climate ==
Vava'u is the wettest part of the whole Tongan group. The climate is tropically hot, but moderated by constant winds. Like the other islands of the Vavaʻu group, Faioa is occasionally hit by cyclones.
