= Lulunga =

Islands of Tonga

Native name: Lulunga
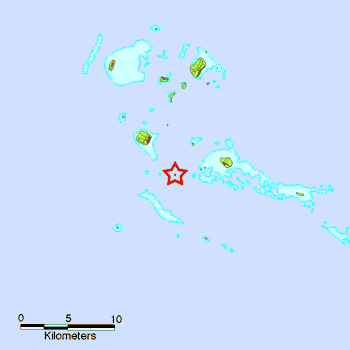
- Map of Lulunga
- Interactive map of Lulunga

Geography
- Location: Pacific Ocean
- Coordinates: 20.052°S 174.731°W
- Archipelago: Tonga Islands

Administration
- Tonga
- Haʻapai
- Largest settlement: Haʻafeva township (pop. ~300)

Demographics
- Population: 923(Census 2016)
- Ethnic groups: Tongan

Lulunga is an island group and a district in Haʻapai administrative division of the Kingdom of Tonga. The archipelago consists of 17 islands, only 5 of which are inhabited. These are Haʻafeva, Matuku, Kotu, ʻOʻua and Tungua. The population of the whole island chain is 923, most of whom live on Haʻafeva.

== List of islands ==
- Fakahiku
- Fetoa
- Fonuaika
- Foua
- Haʻafeva
- Kito
- Kotu
- Lekeleka
- Luanamo
- Matuku
- Nukulei
- Pepea
- Putuputua
- Teaupa
- Tokulu
- Tungua
- ʻOʻua
