= Ovaka =

Island in Tonga

Coordinates: 18°44′39″S 174°06′08″W

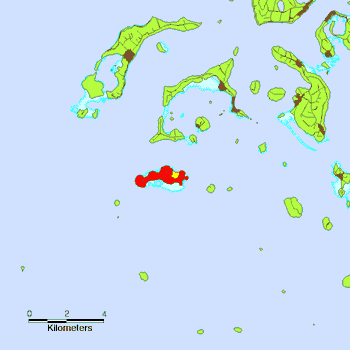
Location of Ovaka in the Vava'u Islands

Ovaka is an island in Tonga. It is located within the Vava'u Group in the far north of the country. It is 2800 meters long east–west, and more than 800 meters wide at its widest point. The namesake village is located on the northeast coast. The island had a population of 96 in 2021.

Notable residents include Salesi (Charles) Liu, who was one of the six sons of chiefs of high rank chosen to accompany Prince Viliami Tungī Mailefihi to school at Newington College in Sydney, Australia, with James Egan Moulton to translate the English Holy Bible into the Tongan language in 1896.

Niuingatoni Liu (dec. 1988) named after Newington College is the son of Salesi Liu who was named in honour of his father's endeavor to Australia and was a well known punake in Tonga. He composed the lakalaka for the villages of Navutoka, Kolonga and Niutoua in Tongatapu, Tonga. To this day, his compositions are still performed at auspicious occasions.
