= Pangai =

Administrative capital village of the Haʻapai group in Tonga

Coordinates: 19°48′12″S 174°20′56″W

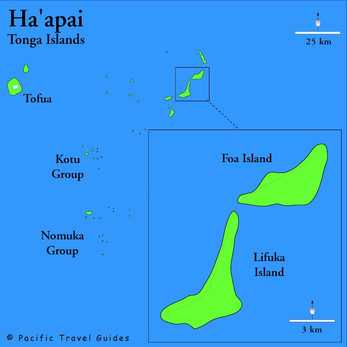
Ha'apai Islands, Pangai on the western coast of Lifuka

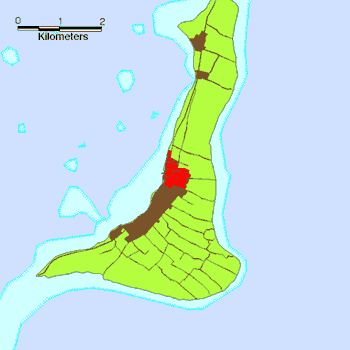
Location of Pangai on Lifuka Island

Pangai is the administrative capital village of the Haʻapai group in Tonga.

== Town ==
The village is on the western shore of Lifuka and has a population of 1,026.

The village center is around the Catholic Church (Siasi Katolika) and Holopeka Road by the harbor. There are only a few shops and markets and one bank.

There are few historic sites besides some churches, a few Colonial styled houses and cemeteries.

== Transportation ==
The island's Pilolevu Airport (Lifuka Island Airport, IATA code "HPA") is situated about 5 km north of Pangai.

There is a ferry dock, called the Pangai Ferry Terminal.

== History ==
The Methodist missionary Shirley Waldemar Baker, who was prime minister of Tonga under king George Tupou I, died in Pangai on 16 November 1903. His grave and monument in the cemetery still stand as a tourist attraction.
