= ʻUiha =

Coordinates: 19°54′06″S 174°24′15″W

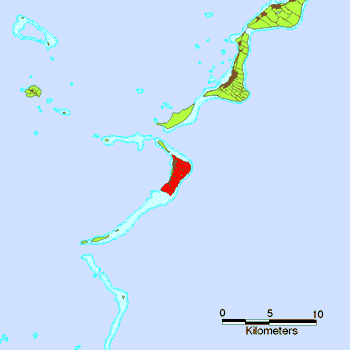
Location of ʻUiha in the Haʻapai Islands

ʻUiha is an island in Lifuka district, in the Haʻapai islands of Tonga. It had a population of 638 in 2006 and an area of 5.36 km^{2} (2.07 sq mi). The island has two villages, ʻUiha and Felemea.

During the summer of 1863 islanders ambushed the slave ship margarita during a blackbirding expedition.

In September 2022 the island's electricity system was transition from a diesel generator to a solar-battery system with diesel backup.

== See also ==
- List of islands and towns in Tonga
