= Sisia =

Island in the Vava'u Group, Tonga

Coordinates: 18°44′S 174°03′W

Sisia is an island in Tonga. It is located within the Vava'u Group in the far north of the country.

== History ==
According to Tongan mythology, legend affirms that Sisia was created by the god Maui who reached the bottom of the sea and pulled it up to the surface and it became part of the Vava‘u group.

The first recorded European to sight Sisia was believed to be Spanish navigator Don Francisco Antonio Mourelle aboard the Princesa on 4 March 1781.

Since then, Sisia has maintained its own deep-sea anchor and is a popular tropical haven for boating.

== Tourism ==
Sisia is a tropical desert islet with no accommodation facilities. It is surrounded by its white sand beach with beautiful views of blue ocean and serves as an all-day anchorage. In mid-July, Sisia sees a possible activity of whale watching.
