= Mapa Faletau =

Tongan diplomat, civil servant (born 1967)

Mapa Faletau, styled Lord 'Akau'ola (born June 27, 1967), is a Tongan noble, diplomat, and civil servant. His estate is in Taunga in the southern Vava'u Group in the far north of the country.

Faletau is the second eldest son of the late Hononorable 'Akau'ola (Inoke Fotu Faletau, 1937–2005). He was educated in the United Kingdom and graduated from high school in Massey, New Zealand.

In 2001 he became acting secretary of civil aviation, and later became permanent secretary. After the death of his father in late 2005, Faletau's official name was changed to 'Akau'ola and he inherited estates in Vava'u which included Taunga and Ngau.

On 2 March 2007, 28 acres (110,000 m^{2}) on Taunga and Ngau were leased by 'Akau'ola to the Warwick International Group of Hotels & Resorts for the construction of a 4 to 5 star hotel resort and spa, which was celebrated as a major achievement for the tourist industry in Tonga.

In 2011 he was forcibly evicted from a government property he had continued to occupy after it had been sold.

In June 2018 Bank South Pacific Tonga obtained a court judgement to begin enforcement against him over nearly $1 million of unpaid debts. The debt was settled later that month.

In August 2019 he was appointed ambassador to the United Arab Emirates.

== Honours ==
National honours

- Order of Queen Sālote Tupou III, Member (31 July 2008)
