= Kotu Island =

Island in Tonga

Coordinates: 19°57′S 174°48′W

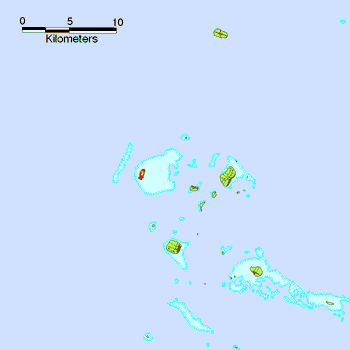
Location of Kotu Island in the Lulunga Islands

Kotu is an island in Lulunga district, in the Ha'apai islands of Tonga. As of 1992, there was one village on the island with a population of approximately 200 people.
