= Taunga =

Island in Vavaʻu, Tonga

Taunga is an island owned by the Matapule ‘Akau‘ola in Tonga. It is located in the south Vava'u Group in the far north of the country. The island had a population of 36 in 2021.

On 2 March 2007, 28 acres (110,000 m^{2}) on Taunga and Ngau were leased by 'Akau'ola and the Government of Tonga to Warwick International Hotels for the construction of a hotel resort and spa.
