= Totokafonua =

Uninhabited island in Tonga

Coordinates: 18°45′30″S 174°07′27″W

Totokafonua is an uninhabited island in Tonga. It is located in the southern part of the Vava'u Group in the north of the country. Along with other uninhabited islands in southern Vava'u it has high biodiversity and is an important nesting site for the Green sea turtle and Hawksbill sea turtle.
