= Haʻafeva =

Island in Tonga

Coordinates: 19°57′S 174°43′W

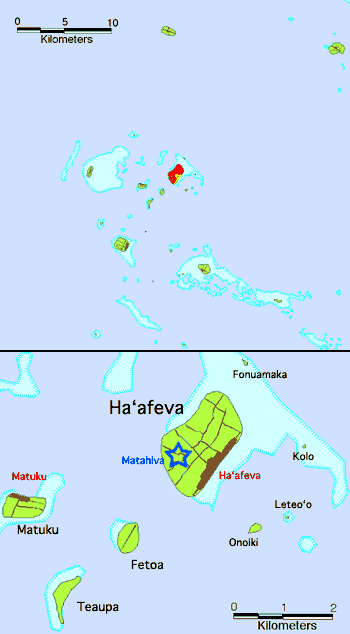

Haʻafeva is a small island in the Haʻapai group of Tonga, but still the main island of the Lulunga archipelago. Kolongatata is the name commonly given to the village on Haʻafeva and is a reference to Haʻafeva's exposure to strong winds. The inhabited area of Haʻafeva can be divided into Hahake, Hihifo, Tuʻa Kolo, Loto Kolo and Uta. The Island has a population of 192.

== Geography ==
Haʻafeva is 42 km southwest of Pangai in the Haʻapai group of islands at Latitude (DMS) 19° 56' 60 S and Longitude (DMS) 174° 43' 0 W.

== History ==
Haʻafeva is the home estate of the chiefly line of Tuʻuhetoka (now merged with Lasike). It was Moatunu, one of their ancestors, who once saved Tāufaʻāhau I from losing a decisive battle and even death at the Battle of Velata in 1826. When Tāufaʻāhau came to Haʻafeva to ask the chief for help with his war against Laufilitonga, the last Tuʻi Tonga to be, the chief did not want to help him, having his allegiance with the other. But when his sister threatened to go instead, he switched loyalty, and fought close to Tāufaʻāhau. Then the latter was hit on the head by several attackers and lay unconscious on the ground. The Haʻafeva chief fought off all enemies until Tāufaʻāhau became conscious again. Later this warrior was named "Tuʻu-he-toka" ("Standing while the chief is sleeping"). Had Tāufaʻāhau been a commoner instead of a chief, the proper term would be tuʻu-he-mohe; had he been king, tuʻu-he-tōfā would have been used.

The area around the island was also the site of the 1789 Mutiny on the Bounty.

The island was damaged by a tropical cyclone in March 1963. In December 1980 the ferry Fetu’umoana capsized near Haʻafeva, with the loss of eleven lives.

== Archaeology ==
Haʻafeva is home to an excavation site dubbed 'Mele Havea', after Mele Havea, whose house is nearby. Hundreds of pieces of early Eastern Lapita pottery were unearthed there in 1996 and 1997 along with various other artifacts of early settlements. Carbon dating places these artifacts at approximately 2690 to 2490 years BP.

== Ferry sinking ==
Haʻafeva was to have been the destination of the ill-fated MV Princess Ashika, an inter-island ferry that sank on 5 August 2009, claiming many lives. Most of those killed were women and children as it is usual in Tonga for men to sleep on the decks of boats while the children and women shelter inside.
