= Taula (Tonga) =

Island in Vavaʻu, Tonga

Coordinates: 18°50′52″S 174°0′39″W

Taula is an island in Tonga. It is located in the far south of the Vavaʻu Group in the far north of the country.
