= Tahifehifa =

Island in Tonga

Coordinates: 18.811223°S 173.997802°W

Tahifehifa is an island in Tonga. It is located within the Vava'u Group in the far north of the country, 15 kilometers (9 miles) south of the town of Neiafu. The island is 1.09 acres in size, and is owned by the Tongan company 'Pacific Oasis Ltd' on a 99-year Deed of Lease.
