= Lifuka =

Island in Tonga

Lifuka Island
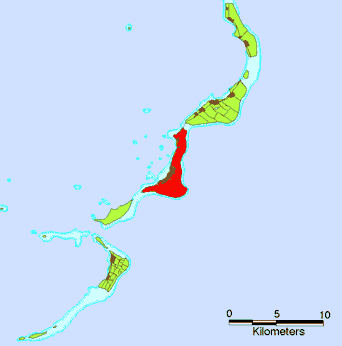
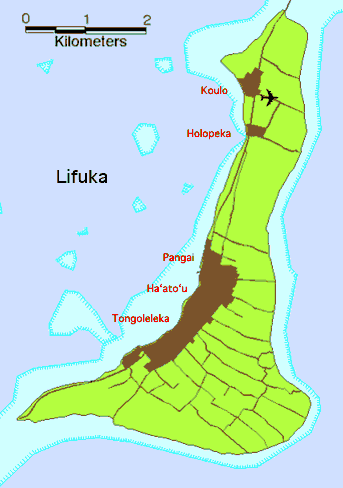
- Maps of Lifuka Island
- Interactive map of Lifuka Island

Geography
- Location: Haʻapai, Tonga
- Coordinates: 19°47′56″S 174°21′24″W
- Archipelago: Haʻapai
- Adjacent to: Pacific Ocean
- Area: 12.21 km^{2} (4.71 sq mi)
- Highest elevation: 12 m (39 ft)

Administration
- Tonga
- Division: Haʻapai
- Largest Administrative capital: Pangai

Demographics
- Population: 2966 (1996)

Additional information
- Time zone: TOT (UTC+13)
- IATA code: HPA
- Alternate spellings: Lefuka, Lefouka

Lifuka Island is an island in Tonga. It sits approximately 170 kilometres north-east of the capital, Nukuʻalofa, and covers an area of 12.2 square kilometres.

The terrain of Lifuka Island is exceptionally flat. The highest point on the island reaches 22 metres above sea level. It measures 7.5 kilometres from north to south and 4.8 kilometres from east to west.

It is located within the Haʻapai group in the centre of the country, to northeast of the national capital of Nukuʻalofa. It is the administrative centre of the Haʻapai group of islands with Pangai being the administrative capital village.

== History ==
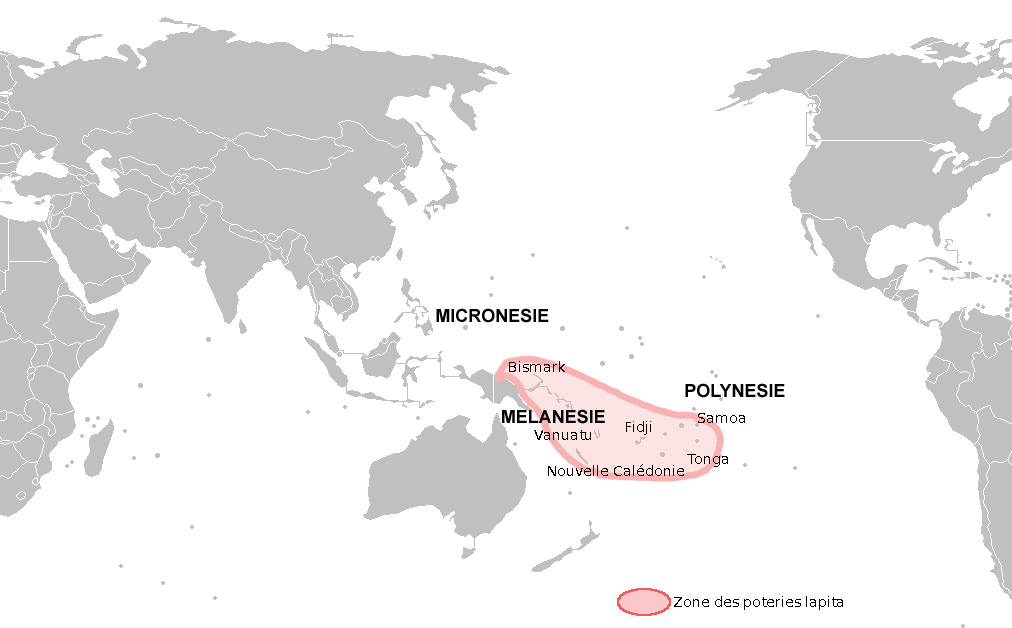
Known distribution of the Lapita culture

Human occupation of Lifuka is very ancient, as evidenced by the archaeological site of Tongoleleka (near Hihifo), which has revealed ceramics from the Lapita culture dating back about 2,700 years.

During the 15th century, the island was integrated into the Tuʻi Tonga Empire. A circular fortress was established at a strategic location to defend the site against potential attacks (Velata fortress).

British navigator Captain James Cook was the first European to set foot on the island in 1777. Invited to festivities given in their honour, the British named the Haʻapai islands the "Friendly Islands". They departed a few weeks later without realizing they had just escaped a trap set by the island's leaders, who were eager to seize the ships. Cook dubbed Tonga "The Friendly Islands". Tofua is where the mutiny on the Bounty occurred in 1789; this active volcanic island lies approximately 40 nautical miles west of Lifuka. The Captain Bligh voyage stands as the longest known successful passage ever recorded in an open boat without modern navigational aids. It was successfully recreated in 2009 by the Talisker Bounty team.

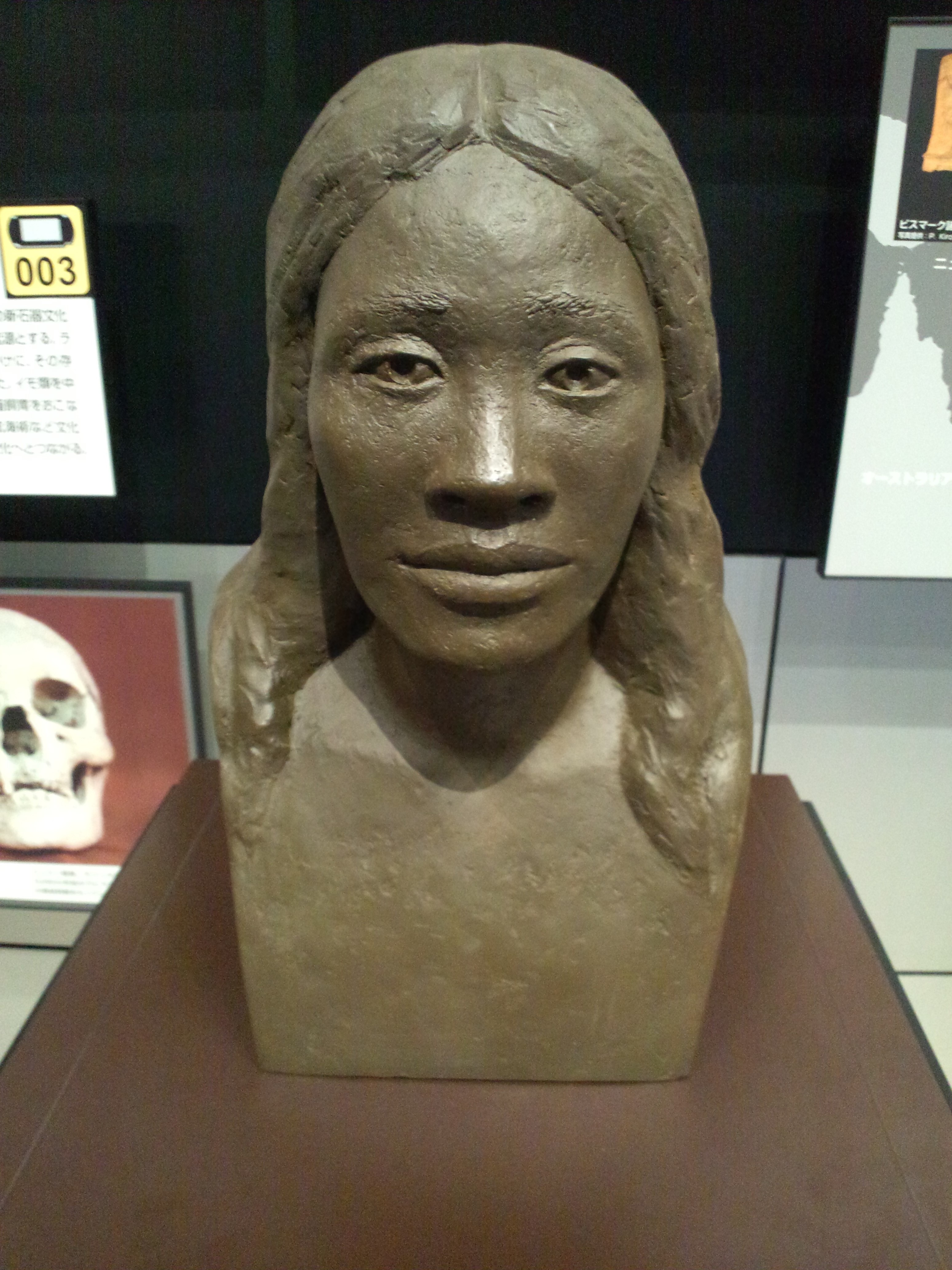
Reconstruction of the face of a Lapita woman exhibited in the National Museum of Ethnology of Japan

Lifuka Island was the final anchorage of the ill-fated Port au Prince. In 1806 the natives off the northwest coast attacked the British privateer and whaler, slaughtering the majority of the crew. One of the few survivors of the attack, William Mariner, was befriended by the King and spent the next four years in the Kingdom before being allowed to return to England. A chance meeting with the author John Martin upon his return resulted in a collaboration that eventually documented the experiences of Mariner in the book An account of the natives of the Tongan Islands, a now highly respected anthropological study of early civilisation in the Kingdom of Tonga. The anchor of the Port au Prince was rediscovered in 2009 by a dive operator based on Lifuka. In August 2012, the wreck of the ship was discovered off the coast of Foa Island, in Tonga.

The lineage of the governors of Haʻapai (the Tuʻi Kanokupolu dynasty) came to power in the person of George Tupou I, who became the first King of Tonga in 1845. At Lifuka, the Huluʻipaongo necropolis still houses the tombs of these distant ancestors of the current royal family.

== Geography ==
Lifuka is the main island of the Haʻapai group, a territory belonging to the archipelago of Tonga. Its main settlement is the small town of Pangai (population around 2,000), located on the western coast. Lifuka is a coral island, a raised coral atoll, with a total area of 11.42 square kilometres. Most of its territory is covered by tropical vegetation combining rainforest, taro plantations, orchards, and coconut groves. It is connected by a tombolo to its sister island of Foa.

== Demography ==
The total population of the island was 2,966 inhabitants during the 1996 census, with nearly two-thirds residing in the capital, Pangai. Apart from the capital, the main villages on the island are Holopeka and Hihifo. It has an area of 11.42 km^{2}.

== Villages ==
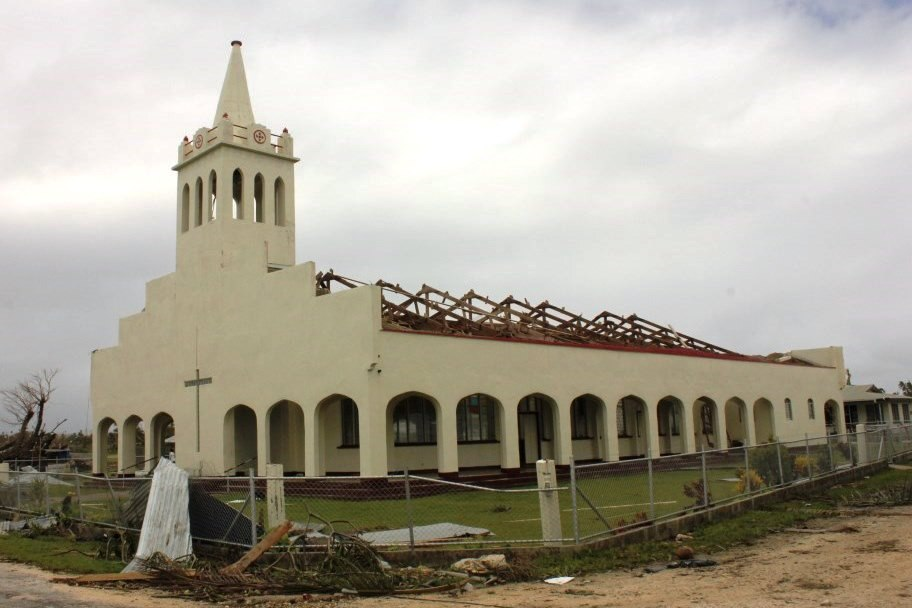
A church on Lifuka that had its roof torn off by Cyclone Ian in January 2014.

Settlements on Lifuka Island include: Haʻatoʻu, Holopeka, Koulo, Pangai, Tongoleleka.

== Transportation ==
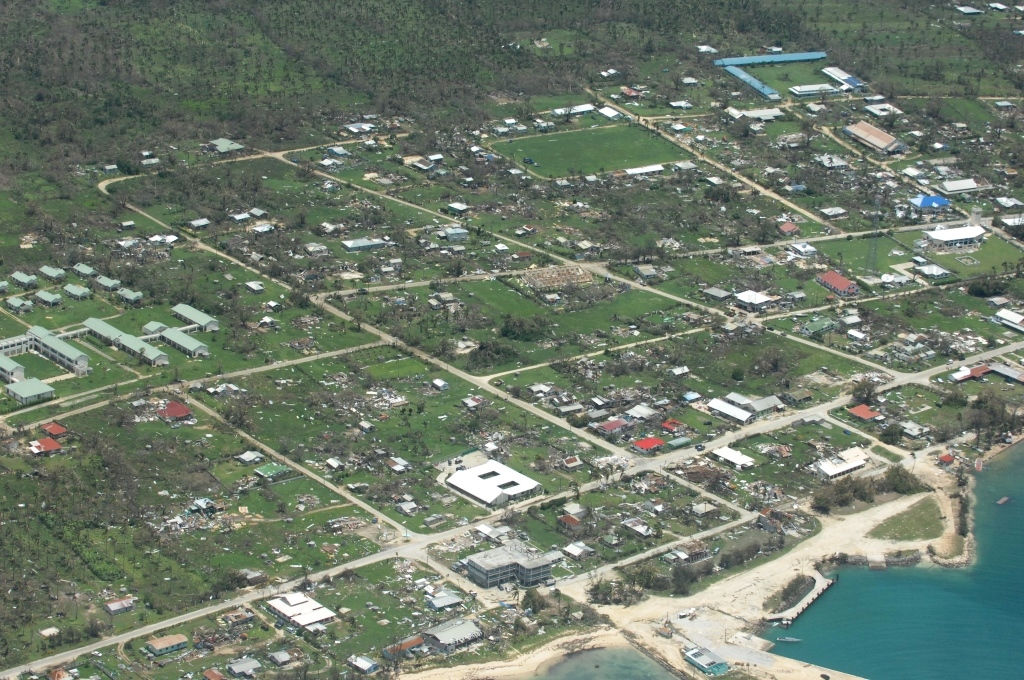
Aerial view of the island after the passage of Cyclone Ian in 2014.

There is an airport, the Lifuka Island Airport.

== See also ==
- List of cities in Tonga
