= Haʻapai =

Group of islands in the Kingdom of Tonga

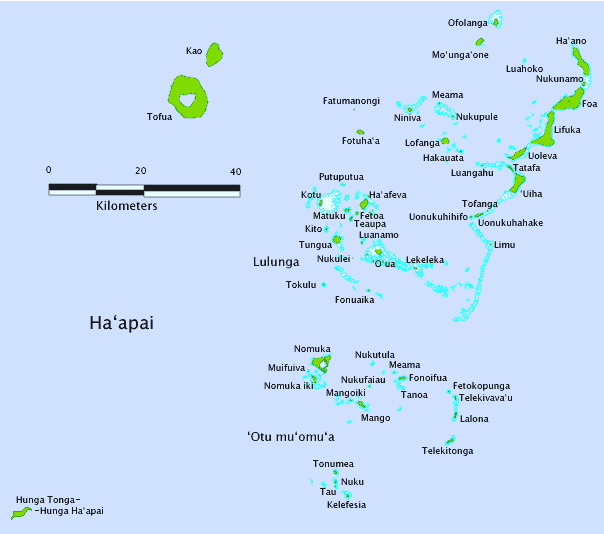
- Map of Haʻapai

Geography
- Location: Pacific Ocean
- Coordinates: 20°0′S 174°40′W
- Archipelago: Tonga Islands
- Total islands: 51
- Major islands: 17
- Area: 109.30 km^{2} (42.20 sq mi)
- Highest elevation: 1,046 m (3432 ft)
- Highest point: Kao

Administration
- Tonga
- Largest settlement: Pangai, Lifuka Island

Demographics
- Population: 5,419 (2021)
- Pop. density: 60.53/km^{2} (156.77/sq mi)
- Ethnic groups: Tongan (majority), European, Chinese, other Pacific Islanders

Location of Haʻapai District in Tonga

Haʻapai is a group of islands, islets, reefs, and shoals in the central part of Tonga. It has a combined land area of 109.30 square kilometres (42.20 sq mi). The Tongatapu island group lies to its south, and the Vavaʻu group lies to its north. Seventeen of the Haʻapai islands are inhabited. Their combined population is 5,419. The highest point in the Ha‘apai group, and in all of Tonga, is on Kao, which rises almost 1,050 metres (3,440 ft) above sea level.

The administrative capital village of Haʻapai District is Pangai, which is located on Lifuka.

== Geography ==
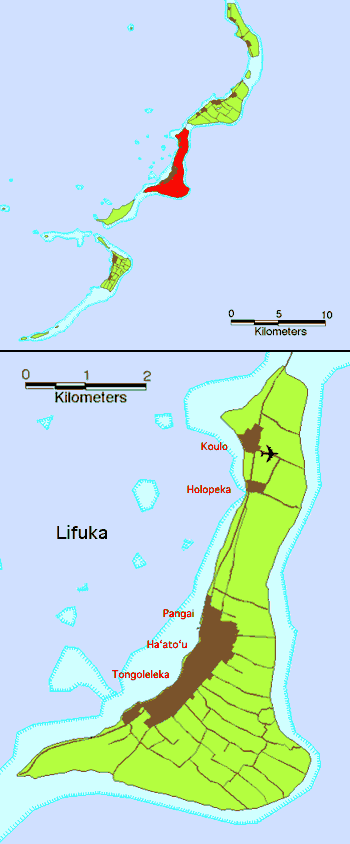
Lifuka Island, capital of Haʻapai

Haʻapai comprises 51 islands that lie directly west of the Tonga Trench. They constitute a chain of both volcanic and coral islands, including Kao, the highest point in the kingdom, which stands 1,046 metres (3,432 ft) high. Farther to the east are the coral islands, which are inhabited. The Haʻapai archipelago lies 204 kilometres (127 mi) north of Tongatapu and 130 kilometres (81 mi) south of Vavaʻu. Seventeen of the islands are inhabited, including the main islands of Lifuka and Foa. The two main villages in the archipelago are Pangai on Lifuka (where Salote Pilolevu Airport is located) and Haʻano. A total of 6125 people live on the Ha'apai islands (Census 2016).

All of the larger islands of Haʻapai are in the eastern Lifuka group. The two largest islands are Lifuka and Foa which in 2016 had recorded populations of 2,205 and 1,392 people respectively. The next largest are Nomuka and Haʻano, which have four villages, with a combined population of 910. To the south of these islands is ʻUiha, which has two villages with a combined population of 695. ʻUiha is also the site of ancient burial grounds and an ancient monument.

The large islands of Tofua (an active volcano) and Kao (a dormant volcano) are in the far west. The islands of the Kotu group, locally known as Lulunga, are in the southwest of the archipelago. The islands of the Nomuka group, locally known as ʻOtu Muʻomuʻa, are farther south. The Hunga Tonga–Hunga Ha'apai volcano is located in the southwest of Haʻapai.

Humpback whales migrate to the area during their “wintering” seasons.

== History ==
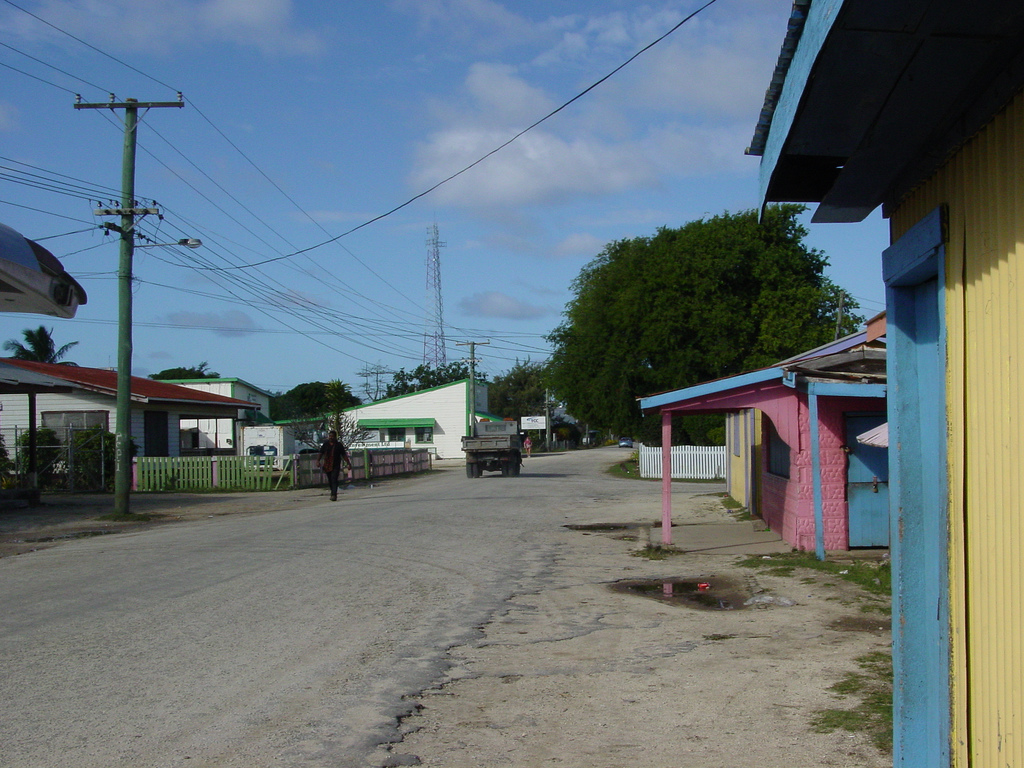
Downtown Pangai, Lifuka Island

Traces of ancient settlements of the Lapita culture, dating from around 1500 BC, have been found at sites within the Haʻapai island group.

The first European to visit Haʻapai was Abel Tasman, in 1643. Captain James Cook made several stops on some of the islands in the group in 1774 and 1777. He gave them the name of the Friendly Islands in 1777.

On 18 May 1777, when Cook arrived on one of the islands, accompanied by Omai, they were greeted by Fatafehi Paulaho, the Tu'i Tonga (meaning 'King of the Tongan islands'), who was the most venerated of any chief on the islands.

On 28 April 1789, the Haʻapai island group was one of the sites involved in the famous Mutiny on the Bounty: Captain William Bligh visited the volcanic island of Tofua shortly after his crew set him adrift following their mutiny.

In 1806, William Mariner arrived on one of the islands, aboard the Port-au-Prince. The crew of this ship was killed by Tongan warriors. Mariner survived, and lived for four years on one of the islands before he was found by a passing English ship and was able to return to England.

In 1840, the US Exploring Expedition visited one of the islands and met with George (Taufa'ahau), the chief of Ha'apai.

Historical population
Year	Pop.	±%
1976	10,792	—
1986	8,919	−17.4%
1996	8,138	−8.8%
2006	7,570	−7.0%
2011	6,616	−12.6%
2016	6,125	−7.4%
2021	5,419	−11.5%

== Governors ==
- Havea Tu‘iha‘angana
- Moʻale Finau (appointed February 2015)
- Tēvita Mohenoa Puloka (appointed 26 June 2018)
- Viliami Hingano (appointed 25 January 2021)
- Pita Faiva Taufatofua (appointed 28 December 2021)

== See also ==
- Mataʻuvave
- 2006 Tonga earthquake
- 2022 Hunga Tonga–Hunga Ha'apai eruption and tsunami
- List of islands and towns in Tonga
