= Tongan tropical moist forests =

Terrestrial ecoregion in Tonga and Niue

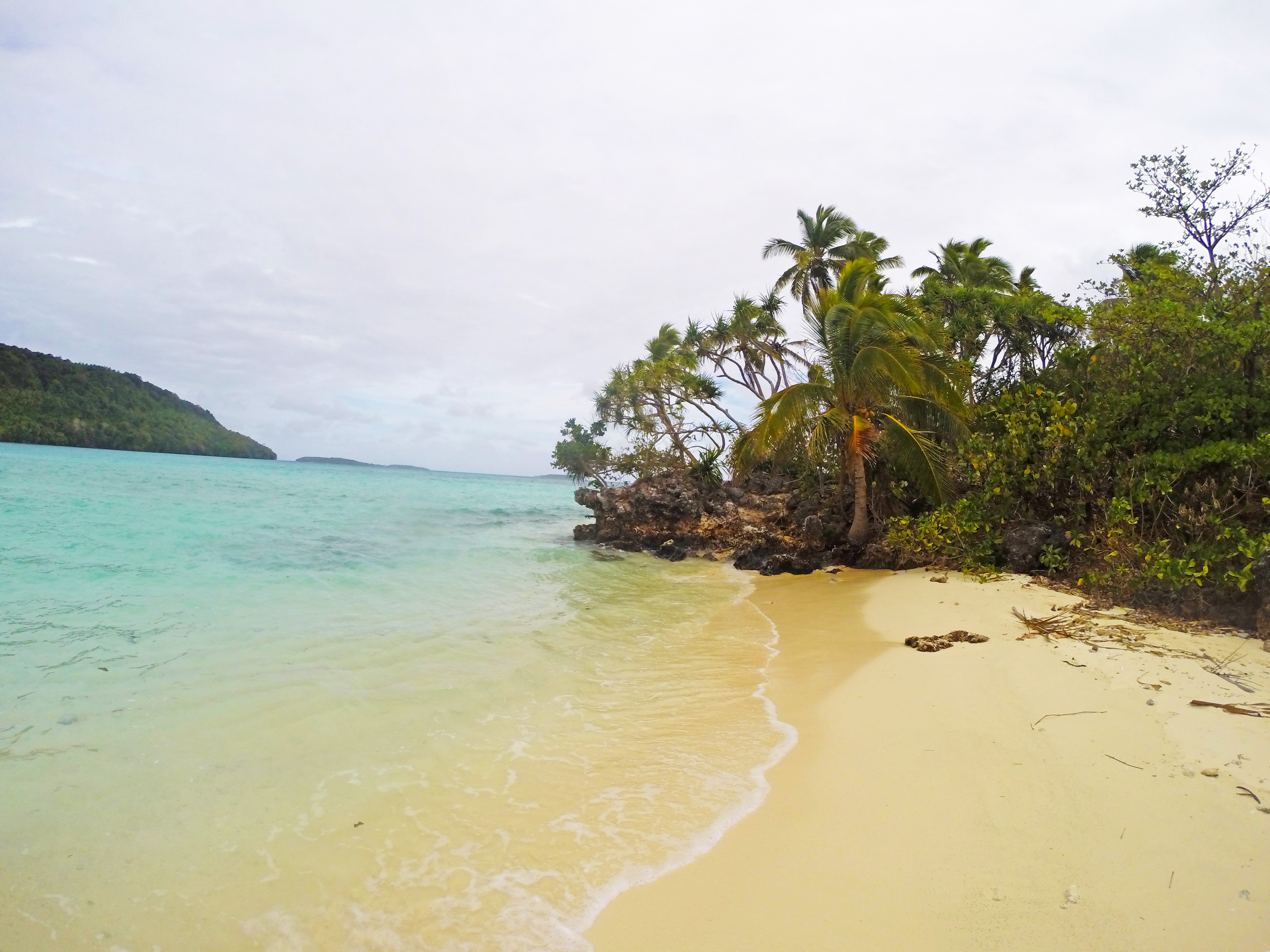
- Nuku Island, Tonga

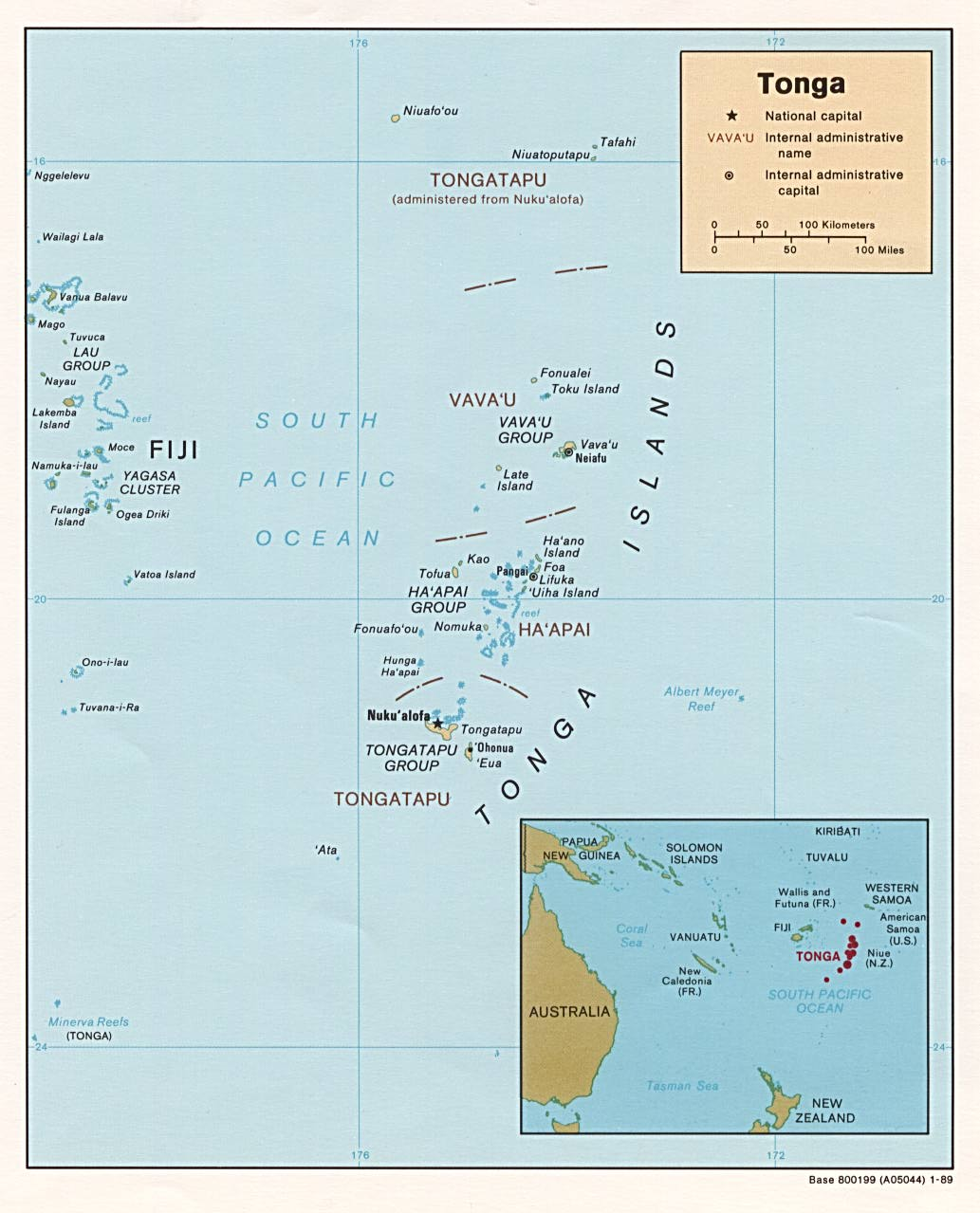
- Map of Tonga

Ecology
- Realm: Oceanian
- Biome: tropical and subtropical moist broadleaf forests

Geography
- Area: 549 km^{2} (212 sq mi)
- Countries: Tonga; Niue

Conservation
- Conservation status: Critical/endangered
- Global 200: South Pacific Islands forests
- Protected: 117 km² (21%)

The Tongan tropical moist forests is a tropical and subtropical moist broadleaf forests ecoregion that includes the Tonga archipelago and Niue.

== Geography ==
The ecoregion includes the Tonga archipelago, a group of 170 islands that extends 800 km north to south between 15º to 23ºS latitude and 173º to 177º W longitude, and comprise the nation of Tonga. It also includes Niue, which lies 400 km east of Tonga at 19º S latitude and 169º W longitude.

The Tonga archipelago lies at the boundary of the Pacific and the Australian tectonic plates, and the islands were created by the subduction of the Pacific Plate under the Australian Plate. The islands on the eastern side of the chain are mostly made up of uplifted coraline rocks lying atop blocks of oceanic or continental crust. Some of the larger eastern islands are Foa, Lifuka, Vavaʻu, 'Eua, and Tongatapu. Several of the islands on the western side of the chain are stratovolcanoes, including 'Ata, Tofua, Kao, Late, and Fonualei in the south, and Niuafo'ou, Niuatoputapu, and Tafahi in the north. The highest peak in the islands is 1,030 metres on Kao. Many islands have fringing coral reefs, and others have become coral atolls as the central islands eroded away or subsided.

Niue is an uplifted coral atoll, with cliffs along the shoreline and without a fringing coral reef. It covers an area of 259 km^{2}.

The islands have been inhabited for about 3000 years.

== Climate ==
The ecoregion has a humid tropical climate. Mean daily temperatures generally range from 24º to 30 °C in February, the warmest month, to 20º to 26 °C in August, the coolest month. Average annual rainfall is 2000 mm or more, and higher on windward slopes and at higher elevations. Rainfall is generally higher between December and April. Leeward lowlands can experience seasonal droughts between May and November.

== Flora ==
The natural vegetation is moist broadleaf forest.

Tropical lowland rain forests predominate below 500 meters elevation. Evergreen trees form a continuous canopy up to 30 meters in height. Common canopy trees include Diospyros spp., Rhus taitensis, Alphitonia zizyphoides, Calophyllum neo-ebudicum, Cryptocarya turbinata, Elattostachys apetala, Litsea mellifera, Maniltoa grandiflora, Myristica hypargyraea, Zanthoxylum pinnatum, Garcinia myrtifolia, Neonauclea forsteri, Didymocheton tongensis (on 'Eua), Podocarpus pallidus, Inocarpus fagifer, Erythrina fusca, Pisonia grandis, Pittosporum arborescens, Garuga floribunda, Ficus obliqua, Pleiogynium timoriense, and Cynometra grandiflora. The understorey includes dense clumps of the fern Dicranopteris linearis and the shrubs Piper puberulum and Psychotria insularum.

On coastal dunes and relatively recent lava and ash deposits where soils are thinner and drier, forests of Casuarina equisetifolia predominate, with low trees and shrubs including Pandanus tectorius, Syzygium dealbatum, Hibiscus tiliaceus, and Scaevola taccada.

Littoral forests of Hernandia nymphaeifolia, Barringtonia asiatica, and Casuarina equisetifolia grow closest to the coast in areas with salt spray. Immediately inland are coastal forests with Pisonia grandis and Excoecaria agallocha as the predominant trees.

Mangrove scrub and mangrove forest are found in saltwater wetlands on coral atolls and around the shores of the larger islands' coastal lagoons. Mangrove scrub is found on estuaries and reef flats and on the edges of mangrove forests. The small- to medium-sized trees Rhizophora mangle, Rhizophora stylosa, and Lumnitzera littorea are dominant. Where conditions are favorable mangrove forests dominated by Bruguiera gymnorhiza with Xylocarpus moluccensis and X. granatum replace the mangrove scrub.

Montane forests are found above 500 metres elevation on the island of Tafahi. The climate is cooler and more humid than that of the lowland forests. Characteristic montane forest tree species include Syzygium spp., Fagraea berteroana, Bischofia javanica, Hernandia moerenhoutiana, Astronidium spp., and Reynoldsia spp. Other montane plant communities are upland volcanic scrub on Kao's young volcanic slopes, and fernlands dominated by Dicranopteris linearis with Lycopodium cernuum and Miscanthus floridulus in highland areas of 'Eua disturbed by human-caused fires.

There are 419 native species of vascular plants in the Tonga, and approximately 3% are endemic.

Plants endemic to Tonga include Alphitonia franguloides var. obtusa, Arytera bifoliata, Grewia amicorum, Grewia populoides, Guioa lentiscifolia, Meiogyne amicorum, Oldenlandia debilis, Pandanus amicalis, Pandanus tongatapuensis, Pandanus vavauensis, Phyllanthus amicorum, Pittosporum yunckeri, Psychotria euaensis, Scaevola porrecta, and Xylosma smithiana.

Several species are endemic to one or two islands:

- Phyllostegia tongaensis is endemic to 'Ata
- Aglaia heterotricha, Didymocheton tongensis, Hedycarya alternifolia, Ixora yunckeri, Plantago euana, and the fern Thelypteris macroptera are endemic to 'Eua
- Dennstaedtia parksii and the orchid Robiquetia tongaensis are endemic to 'Eua and Tongatapu
- the conifer Podocarpus pallidus is endemic to 'Eua and Vava'u
- Psychotria kaoensis and Selaginella yunckeri are endemic to Kao
- Atractocarpus crosbyi, Casearia buelowii, and the palm Pritchardia pacifica are endemic to Vava'u.

Peperomia pallida var. niueana, Myoporum nieuanum, and the orchid Dendrobium niueense are endemic to Niue.

== Fauna ==
There are no native land mammals in the ecoregion. Native bats include the Pacific flying fox (Pteropus tonganus) and Pacific sheath-tailed bat (Emballonura semicaudata). The black rat (Rattus rattus) and brown rat (R. norvegicus) were introduced to the islands by humans, and have decimated the island's birds.

Tonga has native 20 species of land and freshwater birds. The Tongan whistler (Pachycephala jacquinoti) is an endemic species found the Vava'u Group. The Niuafo'ou megapode (Megapodius pritchardii) is endemic to Niuafo'ou island. Other native birds include the red shining parrot (Prosopeia tabuensis) and blue-crowned lorikeet (Vini australis).

The islands are home to numerous seabirds, including brown noddy (Anous stolidus), Phoenix petrel (Pterodroma alba), and bristle-thighed curlew (Numenius tahitiensis). Seabird breeding colonies are mostly limited to offshore islets free of rats, which prey on eggs and chicks.

Niue has 12 native species of land birds and six species of seabirds, including two endemic subspecies.

There are 20 known species of reptiles in the ecoregion. They include the Lau banded iguana (Brachylophus fasciatus), the boa Candoia bibroni, nine species of gecko, and nine species of skink. The skink Tachygia microlepsis is now considered extinct. Fossil remains of a giant land iguana have been found, which became extinct after the first humans arrived.

== Protected areas ==
A 2017 assessment found that 117 km^{2}, or 21%, of the ecoregion is in protected areas.
