= Volcano F =

Submarine volcano in Tonga

Highest point
- Elevation: −40 metres (−130 ft)
- Listing: List of volcanoes in Tonga
- Coordinates: 18.325°S 174.365°W

Geography
- Location: Tonga Islands

Geology
- Formed by: Subduction zone volcanism
- Mountain type: Caldera
- Last eruption: 6–8 August 2019

Volcano F (also known as Volcano 0403-091 or by its volcano number, 243091) is a submarine volcano in the Tonga Islands of the South Pacific Ocean located about 45 kilometres (28 mi) northwest of Vavaʻu, around 35 kilometres (22 mi) south of Fonualei and 60 kilometres (37 mi) northeast of Late on the Tofua volcanic arc.

The volcano was first mapped in 2004, and assigned the name "Volcano F".

== Description ==
It consists of a large 8.7-by-6-kilometre (5.4 mi × 3.7 mi) caldera with a depth of about 670 metres (2,200 ft) and 720 metres (2,360 ft) in its northwestern and southeastern sections, respectively. The caldera walls are 200–300 metres (660–980 ft) high, with the highest peak on the rim only 35 metres (115 ft) below sea level as of 2004. The entire volcano rises 1,000 m (3,300 ft) from the sea floor.

== Eruption history ==
The volcano has erupted on three occasions in recent times—in 1964, 2001 and 2019—each time producing a floating pumice raft, a visible sign that an underwater eruption has occurred. Pumice can float for more than 10 days, even months or years, depending on its porosity, before taking on enough water to sink.

Following its latest eruption, it was identified as the source of the previously unattributed 1964 pumice raft that was found in the Coral Sea.

The volcano erupted in September 2001, resulting in an eruption column and a pumice raft which later reached the coast of Australia.

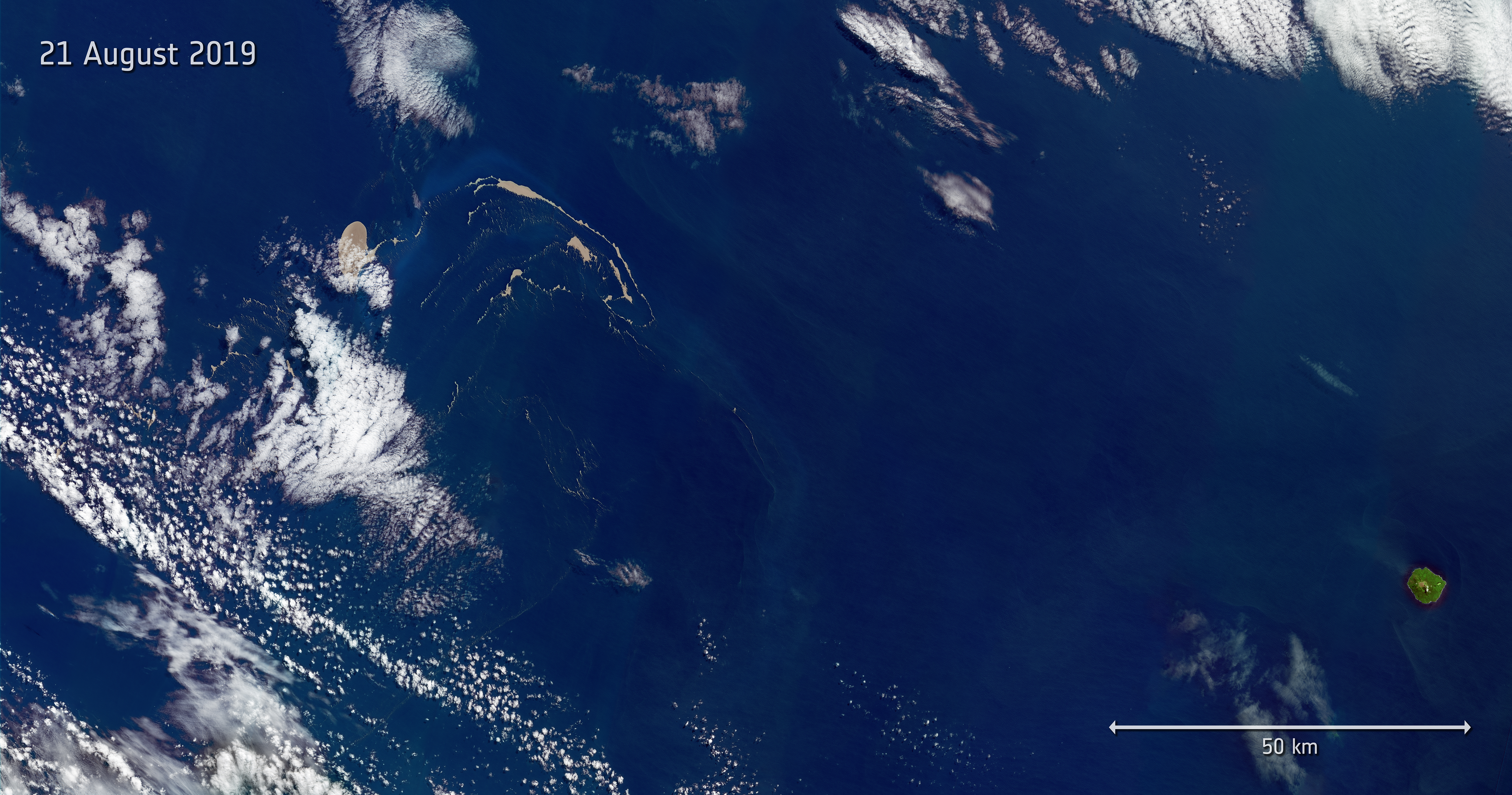
The pumice raft generated by the August 2019 eruption. Captured by the Copernicus Sentinel-2 mission on 21 August 2019

In August 2019 a 150 km^{2} (58 mi^{2}) pumice raft was discovered floating in the Pacific Ocean in Tonga. The pumice raft was observed by numerous boats and reached Fiji in September and later Australia. Discoloured water and analysis of the drift path using satellite imagery showed that the raft had originated from an eruption of Volcano F beginning on 6 August 2019. The eruption was preceded by a series of earthquakes on 5 August, and ceased on 8 August. Between the 30-70% of the ejected material which formed the pumice raft and the remainder that settled on the ocean floor down-current of the vent, this classifies the eruption as volcanic explosivity index 3.

== Consequences ==
Three eruptions in such a short span is a matter of concern and suggests a need for monitoring.

An obscure beneficial consequence is that pumice rafts accumulate marine organisms, such as algae, barnacles and coral, which find shelter in the pumice. If they reach coral reefs, such as the Great Barrier Reef, they can bolster the reef ecology. Parts of the 2019 raft from this volcano reached Queensland, Australia, in April-May 2020.

== See also ==
- List of volcanoes in Tonga
