= Geography of Tonga =

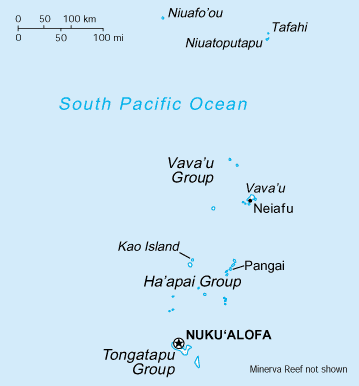
- Continent: Pacific Ocean
- Region: Oceania
- Coordinates: 20°S 175°W
- Area: Ranked 174th
  - Total: 747 km^{2} (288 sq mi)
  - Land: 95.98%
  - Water: 4.02%
- Coastline: 419 km (260 mi)
- Borders: None
- Highest point: on Kao; 1,033 metres (3,389 ft)
- Lowest point: Pacific Ocean; 0 metres (0 ft)
- Exclusive economic zone: 659,558 km^{2} (254,657 mi^{2})

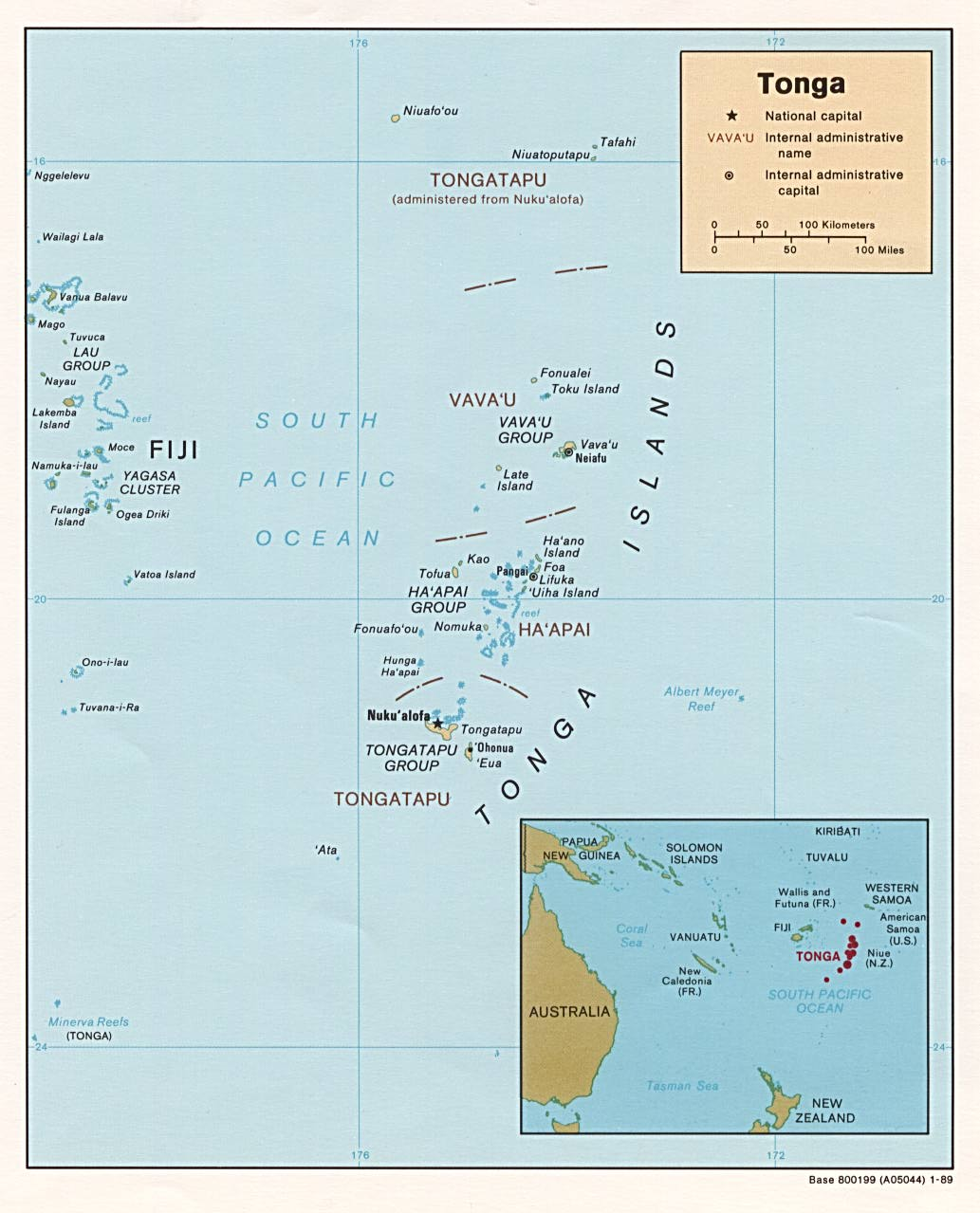
Tonga's position in the South Pacific

Located in Oceania, Tonga is a small archipelago in the South Pacific Ocean, directly south of Samoa and about two-thirds of the way from Hawaii to New Zealand. It has 169 islands, 36 of them inhabited, which are in three main groups – Vavaʻu, Haʻapai, and Tongatapu – and cover an 800-kilometre-long (500-mile) north–south line. The total size is just 747 km^{2} (288 mi^{2}). Due to the spread-out islands it has the 40th largest Exclusive Economic Zone of 659,558 km^{2} (254,657 mi^{2}).

The largest island, Tongatapu, on which the capital city of Nukuʻalofa is located, covers 257 square kilometres (99 sq mi). Geologically the Tongan islands are of two types: most have a limestone base formed from uplifted coral formations; others consist of limestone overlaying a volcanic base.

== Climate ==
The climate is tropical with a distinct warm period (December–April), during which the temperatures rise above 32 °C (89.6 °F), and a cooler period (May–November), with temperatures rarely rising above 27 °C (80.6 °F). The temperature increases from 23 to 27 °C (73.4 to 80.6 °F), and the annual rainfall is from 1,700 to 2,970 millimetres (66.9 to 116.9 inches) as one moves from Tongatapu in the south to the more northerly islands closer to the Equator. The average wettest period is around March with on average 263 mm (10.4 in). The average daily humidity is 80%. Cyclones can occur from October to April.

Climate data for Nukuʻalofa (Elevation: 2m)
Month	Jan	Feb	Mar	Apr	May	Jun	Jul	Aug	Sep	Oct	Nov	Dec	Year
Record high °C (°F)	32 (90)	32 (90)	31 (88)	30 (86)	30 (86)	28 (82)	28 (82)	28 (82)	28 (82)	29 (84)	30 (86)	31 (88)	32 (90)
Mean daily maximum °C (°F)	29.4 (84.9)	29.9 (85.8)	29.6 (85.3)	28.5 (83.3)	26.8 (80.2)	25.8 (78.4)	24.9 (76.8)	24.8 (76.6)	25.3 (77.5)	26.4 (79.5)	27.6 (81.7)	28.7 (83.7)	27.3 (81.1)
Daily mean °C (°F)	26.4 (79.5)	26.8 (80.2)	26.6 (79.9)	25.3 (77.5)	23.6 (74.5)	22.7 (72.9)	21.5 (70.7)	21.5 (70.7)	22.0 (71.6)	23.1 (73.6)	24.4 (75.9)	25.6 (78.1)	24.1 (75.4)
Mean daily minimum °C (°F)	23.4 (74.1)	23.7 (74.7)	23.6 (74.5)	22.1 (71.8)	20.3 (68.5)	19.5 (67.1)	18.1 (64.6)	18.2 (64.8)	18.6 (65.5)	19.7 (67.5)	21.1 (70.0)	22.5 (72.5)	20.9 (69.6)
Record low °C (°F)	16 (61)	17 (63)	15 (59)	15 (59)	13 (55)	11 (52)	10 (50)	11 (52)	11 (52)	12 (54)	13 (55)	16 (61)	10 (50)
Average rainfall mm (inches)	174 (6.9)	210 (8.3)	206 (8.1)	165 (6.5)	111 (4.4)	95 (3.7)	95 (3.7)	117 (4.6)	122 (4.8)	128 (5.0)	123 (4.8)	175 (6.9)	1,721 (67.8)
Average rainy days	17	19	19	17	15	14	15	13	13	11	12	15	180
Average relative humidity (%)	77	78	79	76	78	77	75	75	74	74	73	75	76
Source: Weatherbase

== Geology ==
Though administratively divided into the three main island groups of Tongatapu, Ha'apai, and Vava'u (excluding the outlying islands), the Tonga archipelago is actually made of two geologically different parallel chains of islands.

The western islands, such as ʻAta (also known as Pylstaart island), Fonuafo'ou, Tofua, Kao, Lata'iki, Late, Fonualei, Toku, Niuatoputapu, and Tafahi, make up the Tongan Volcanic Arc and are all of volcanic origin. They were created from the subduction of the westwards-moving Pacific plate under the Australia-India plate at the Tonga Trench. The Tongan Islands sit on the Australia-India plate just west of the Tonga Trench. These volcanoes are formed when materials in the descending Pacific plate heat and rise to the surface. There is only limited coral reef development on these islands, except for Niuatoputapu.

The eastern islands are not volcanic and sit above the mostly submerged Tonga ridge that runs parallel to the Tongan Volcanic Arc and the Tongan Trench. Of these islands, only 'Eua has risen high enough to expose its underlying Eocene volcanic bedrock, the rest are either low coral limestone islands (Tongatapu, Vava'u, Lifuka) or sand cay islands ('Uoleva, 'Uiha). These islands are surrounded by "a protective and resource-rich labyrinth of fringing, apron and off-shore barrier reefs" that have supported most of the human settlement in Tonga ever since the first Lapita People arrived circa 900 BCE.

The Tongan Volcanic Arc has been important in supplying the islands on the Tonga ridge with an andesite tephra soil that has resulted in "an extremely rich soil capable of supporting a high-yield, short-fallow agricultural system." Also, the andesite/basalt from the volcanoes were initially used as "hammerstones, weaving weights, cooking stones, and decorative pebbles for grave decoration." Tafahi island in the far north provided volcanic glass to initial human settlers.

In December 2014 and January 2015, a volcanic island 1 km wide by 2 km long was created adjacent to the island of Hunga Tonga–Hunga Ha'apai 65 kilometers northwest of Nuku'alofa. The volcanic eruption has built the new island to a height of 100 m composed of ash and large rock fragments. In regards to volcanism, Tonga has moderate volcanic activity. Fonualei (elev. 180 m) has shown frequent activity in recent years, while Niuafo'ou (elev. 260 m), which last erupted in 1985, has forced evacuations; other historically active volcanoes include Late and Tofua. Natural hazards include earthquakes and volcanic activity at Fonuafo'ou (Falcon Shoal/Island) and Late'iki (Metis Shoal/Island).

== Facts ==
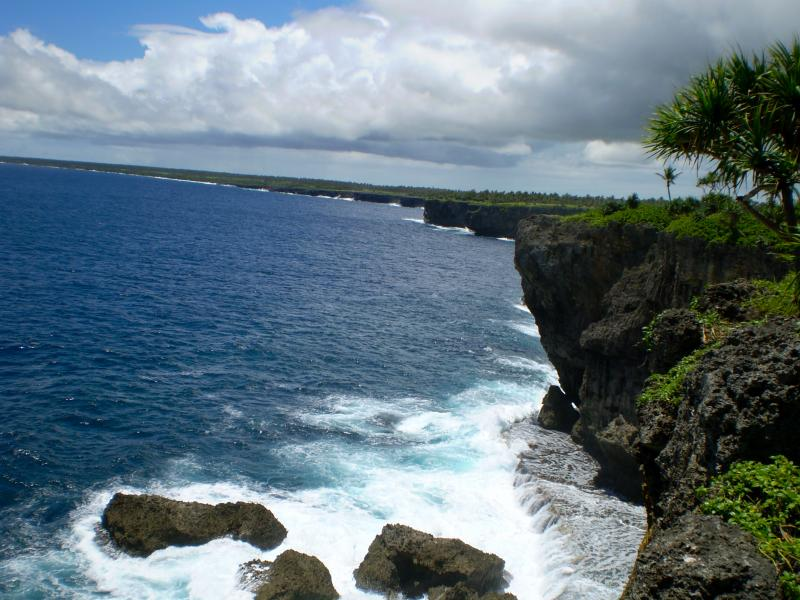
Coastline in Tonga.

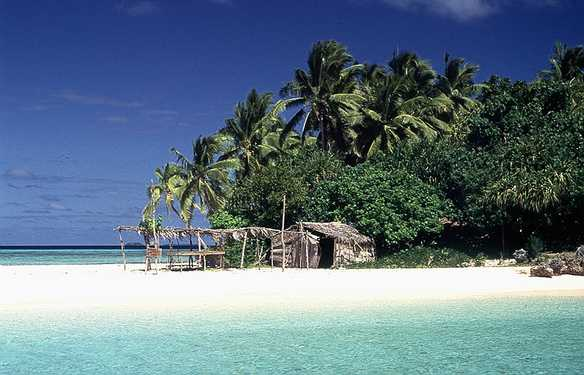
Nuku Island Vava'u

Geographic coordinates: 20°S 175°W

Area:
total: 747 km^{2} (288 sq mi)
land: 717 km^{2} (277 sq mi)
water: 30 km^{2} (12 sq mi)

Coastline: 419 km (260 mi)

Maritime claims:
continental shelf: 200 m (656 ft) depth or to the depth of exploitation
exclusive economic zone: 659,558 km^{2} (254,657 mi^{2}) and 200 nmi (370.4 km; 230.2 mi)
territorial sea: 12 nmi (22.2 km; 13.8 mi)

Elevation extremes:
lowest point: Pacific Ocean 0 m (0 ft)
highest point: unnamed location on Kao 1,033 m (3,389 ft)

Land use:
arable land: 21.33%
permanent crops: 14.67%
other: 64.00% (2011)

Environment - international agreements:
party to: Biodiversity, Climate Change, Climate Change Kyoto-Protocol, Desertification, Law of the Sea, Marine Dumping, Marine Life Conservation, Ozone Layer Protection, and Ship Pollution.

Natural resources are fish and fertile soil. Current environmental issues are deforestation as more and more land is being cleared for agriculture and settlement; some damage to coral reefs from starfish and indiscriminate coral and shell collectors; and overhunting threatens native sea turtle populations.

== See also ==
- Tongan tropical moist forests
- List of islands and towns in Tonga

== Sources ==
- This article incorporates public domain material from the United States Department of State
- World Factbook
