= Home Reef =

Neovolcanic island in the South Pacific

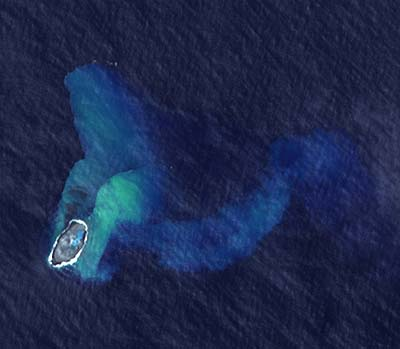
- Aster simulated natural-color image. The two bluish plumes are hot seawater laden with volcanic ash and chemicals. The plumes can be traced for almost 15 km (9.3 mi) to the east.

- Location within Tonga
- Summit depth: −10 m (−33 ft)

Location
- Location: Home Reef is located between Metis Shoal and Late Island, Tonga
- Coordinates: 18°59′28″S 174°45′47″W
- Country: Tonga

Geology
- Type: Seamount
- Last eruption: September 23, 2023 (ongoing)

Home Reef is a volcanic island atop a submarine volcano in Tonga. It is located southwest of Vava'u, between the islands of Kao and Late along the Tofua volcanic arc. The island is ephemeral, and has been repeatedly built and eroded by successive eruptions in 1852, 1857, 1984, 2006, 2022, and 2023.

An eruption in 1984 built a small, temporary island 1,500 by 500 metres (4,900 ft × 1,600 ft), as well as pumice rafts which washed up as far away as Fiji and Australia. The island washed away within a few months.

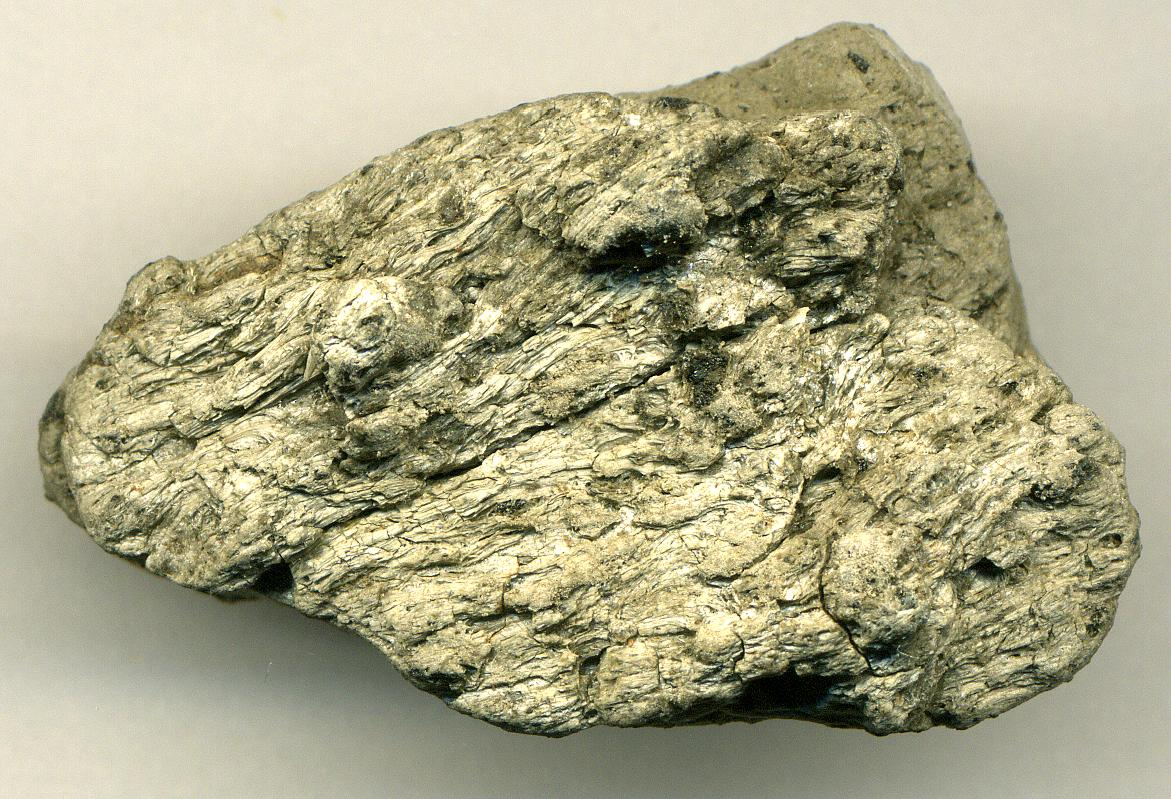
Dacite pumice (2006 eruption; collected at a beach in northern Fiji Islands)

After a volcanic eruption started on 8 August 2006, Home Reef emerged as an island; that eruption also spewed into Tongan waters large amounts of floating pumice, which swept across to Fiji about 350 km (220 mi) to the west of the new island. In October 2006, it reached almost the same size as it did in 1984, when it was about 0.5 km × 1.5 km (0.3 by 0.9 miles). The island was first seen by the crew of a yacht, who recorded its emergence in their blog. The eruptions produced extensive rafts of pumice, which drifted northeast from the new island. The pumice rafts and new island were imaged by the Aqua satellite in August 2006. Images also revealed several small hot crater lakes on the newly formed island.

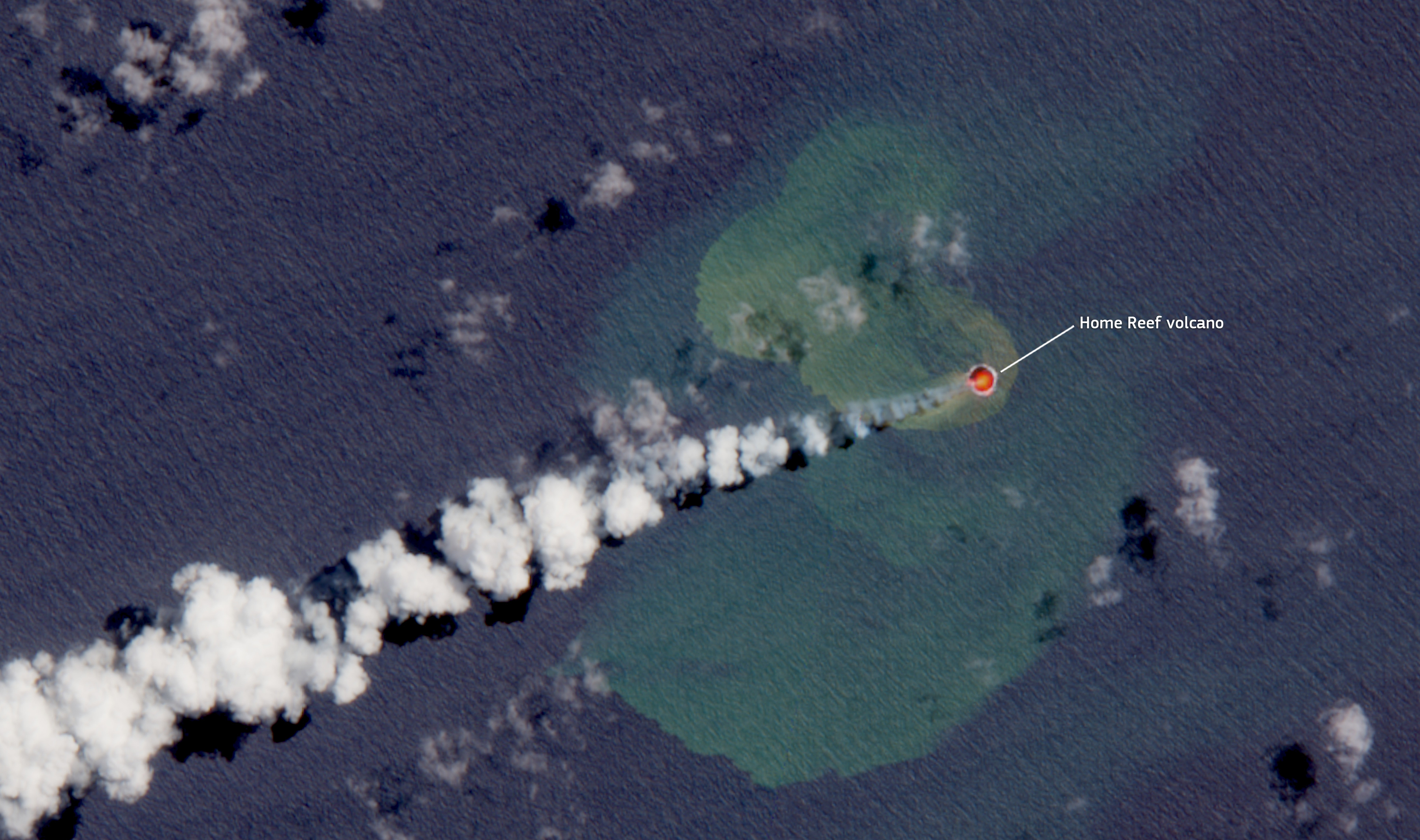
A satellite image of the 2022 eruption.

The volcano erupted again in September 2022. Eruptions began on 10 September, and by 17 September had built an island with an area of 6 acres (2.4 ha) and an elevation of 10 metres (33 ft) above sea level. On 20 September the Tonga Geological Services warned of ash to a height of 3 kilometres (1.9 mi), drifting up to 50 kilometres (31 mi) northwards and 70 kilometres (43 mi) eastwards. On 23 September 2022 the island was reported to have grown to 8 acres (3.2 ha) in size, estimated at 8.6 acres (3.5 ha) the following day. On 25 September, the island had an elevation of 15 metres (49 ft) above sea level. By 3 October it had grown to 15 acres (6.1 ha) in size. The eruption ended on 17 October.

On the 23 of September, 2023, satellites spotted heat sources and a plume of volcanic gas coming from the island. As of October 1, 2023, the eruption is still going and is likely to continue and grow the island.

A visit to the island by volcanologists in November 2025 found it to be over 1km in diameter and 70m high.

== See also ==
- List of volcanoes in Tonga
- List of recently born islands
