= Oliva obesina =

Scientific classification
- Kingdom: Animalia
- Phylum: Mollusca
- Class: Gastropoda
- Subclass: Caenogastropoda
- Order: Neogastropoda
- Family: Olividae
- Genus: Oliva
- Species: O. obesina

Binomial name
- Oliva obesina Duclos, 1840

Synonyms
- Oliva aldinia Duclos, 1844

Species of gastropod

Oliva obesina is a species of sea snail, a marine gastropod mollusk in the family Olividae, the olives.

== Description ==
The length of the shell attains 44 mm.

== Distribution ==
This marine species occurs off the Tonga Islands and Japan.
