= Fonuafoʻou =

Submarine volcano in Ha'apai, Tonga

Fonuafo'ou
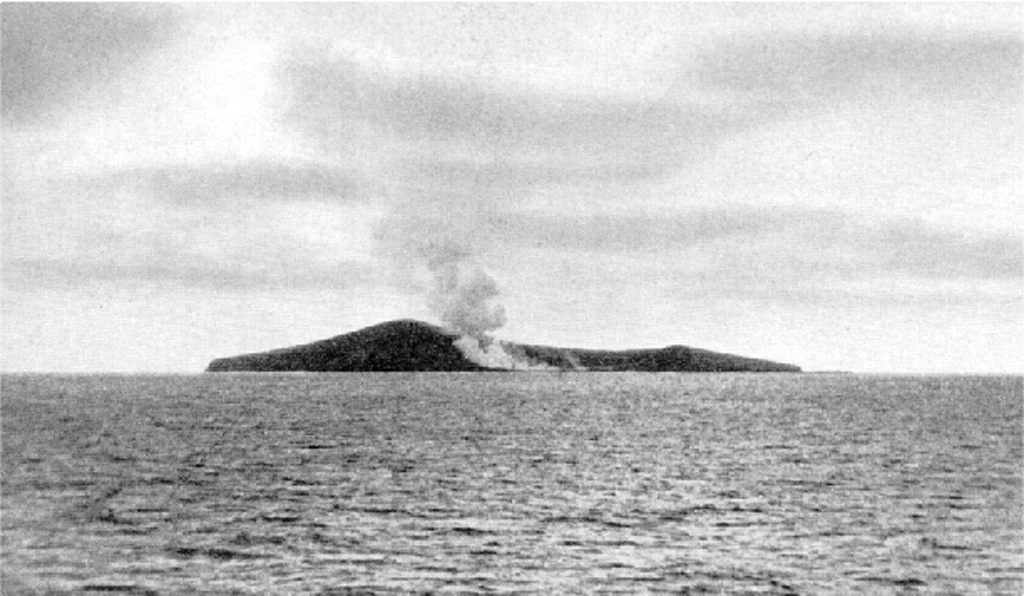
- Fonuafo'ou (date unknown, probably first half of 20th century)

Highest point
- Elevation: 17 metres (56 ft)
- Listing: List of volcanoes in Tonga
- Coordinates: 20.32°S 175.42°W

Geography
- Location: Tonga Islands

Geology
- Formed by: Subduction zone volcanism
- Mountain type: Submarine volcano
- Last eruption: 1936

Fonuafo‘ou ("New land" in Tongan), formerly known as Falcon Island, is a submarine volcano in the western part of the Haʻapai group in Tonga. It is part of the highly active Tonga–Kermadec subduction zone and its associated volcanic arc, which extends from New Zealand north-northeast to Fiji and is formed by the subduction of the Pacific Plate under the Indo-Australian Plate. It lies about 100 km (62 mi) above an active seismic zone. The volcano has created an island several times throughout history.

It was first documented by Spanish explorer Francisco Antonio Mourelle, who reported a bank in the area in 1781. In 1865, the crew of the British ship HMS Falcon reported a reef, and some time later HMS Sappho reported smoke coming from it. On 11 October 1885, the volcano erupted and spouted tons of molten lava. Three days later, on 14 October 1885, the eruption created an island, which was named "Falcon island" by the British. In 1889 it was surveyed by HMS Egeria and found to be 1.3 miles long and 1 mile wide, with a height of 153 feet, but was rapidly eroding due to its loose composition. In 1892 the Tonga government annexed the island, which raised the Tongan flag and planted 2000 coconut plants. But in April 1894 it had sunk beneath the waves again.

A further series of eruptions raised another island in 1927, which was duly annexed again in 1928, but this too had sunk by 1946. New eruptions were recorded in 1954, 1965, and 1970.

The seafloor around Fonuafo‘ou was mapped in 2022 following the eruption of Hunga Tonga–Hunga Haʻapai. It found an undersea caldera 5km wide.
