= Pumice raft =

Floating mass of pumice in the ocean

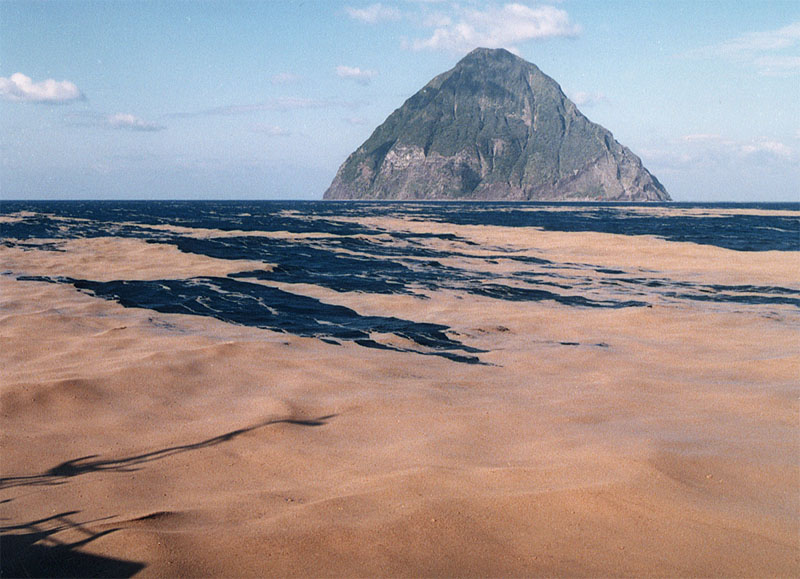
Pumice rafts from the eruption of Fukutoku-Okanoba submarine volcano in 1986, seen from a ship

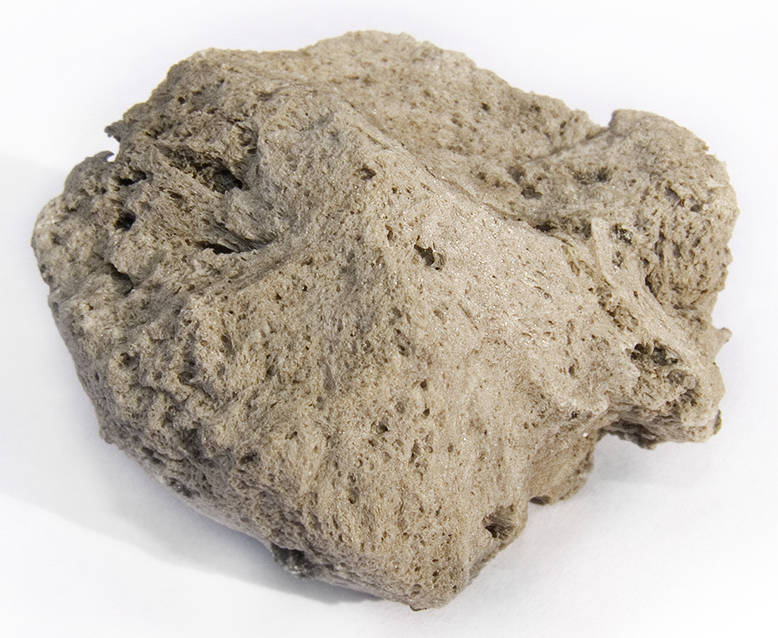
A piece of pumice

A pumice raft is a floating raft of pumice created by some eruptions of submarine volcanoes or coastal subaerial volcanoes.

Pumice rafts have unique characteristics, such as the highest surface-area-to-volume ratio known for any rock type, long term flotation and beaching in the tidal zone, exposure to a variety of conditions, including dehydration, and an ability to absorb many potentially advantageous elements/compounds. For at least these reasons, astrobiologists have proposed pumice rafts as a possible ideal substrate for the origin of life.

Biologists have suggested that animals and plants have migrated from island to island on pumice rafts.

== Notable examples ==
Sandy Island, a non-existent island near New Caledonia, was reported in 1876 by the whaling ship Velocity and subsequently included on some maps well into the 20th century. According to a team of University of Sydney scientists, it is possible that this false report may have been occasioned by pumice rafts being mistaken by the Velocity for dry land.

=== 20th century and onward ===
Pumice rafts drifted to Fiji in 1979 and 1984 from eruptions around Tonga, and some were reportedly 30 kilometres (19 miles) wide. Similar drift events occurred in 2001 and 2019.

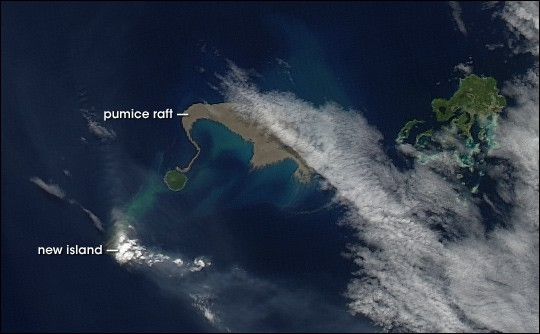
Satellite image of a pumice raft near Vavaʻu, Tonga, in August 2006

Volcanic activity in the South Pacific near Tonga on August 12, 2006 caused the emergence of a new island. The crew of the Maiken, a yacht that had left the northern Tongan islands group of Vava'u in August, reported that they had seen streaks of light, porous pumice stone floating in the water—and then had "sailed into a vast, many-miles-wide belt of densely packed pumice". They went on to witness the ephemeral island known as Home Reef breaching the surface.

A very large pumice raft appeared near New Zealand in August 2012. It was reported to be spread over an area 480 kilometres (300 mi) long and about 50 kilometres (30 mi) wide, with pumice blocks poking up to 60 centimetres (2 ft) above the ocean surface. On 10 August 2012 the raft with an estimated area of 26,000 square kilometres (10,000 mi^{2}) was observed near Raoul Island, north-east of New Zealand by the Royal New Zealand Navy. A possible source for the pumice was the July 2012 eruption of Havre seamount in the Kermadec Islands north of New Zealand.

In August 2019, a large floating pumice raft covering 150 square kilometres (58 sq mi) was discovered in the tropical Pacific Ocean near Late Island in the Kingdom of Tonga. Sailors described a "rubble slick made up of rocks from marble to basketball size such that water was not visible", as well as a smell of sulfur.

== See also ==
- Curacoa volcano
- Floating island
- Lava balloons
