= Curacoa volcano =

Submarine volcano in Tonga

Curacoa

Highest point
- Elevation: −33 metres (−108 ft)
- Listing: List of volcanoes in Tonga
- Coordinates: 15.62°S 173.67°W

Geography
- Location: Tonga Islands

Geology
- Formed by: Subduction zone volcanism
- Mountain type: Submarine volcano
- Last eruption: May 1979

Curacoa is a submarine volcano located south of the Curacoa Reef in northern Tonga. The reef is 24km North of Tafahi in the Niua Islands. Eruptions were observed in 1973 and 1979 from two separate vents. The 1973 eruption produced a large raft of dacitic pumice, and had a volcanic explosivity index (VEI) of 3.

== See also ==
- List of volcanoes in Tonga
