= List of volcanoes in Tonga =

This is a list of active and extinct volcanoes in Tonga.

| Name | Elevation | Location | Last eruption |
| Name | Elevation | Coordinates | Last eruption |
|---|---|---|---|
| ʻAta | 382 m (1,253 ft) | 22.15°S 176.18°W | - |
| Curacoa | −33 m (−108 ft) | 15.62°S 173.67°W | 1979 |
| Dugong | −1,170 m (−3,839 ft) | 15.431°S 175.725°W | - |
| East Mata | −1,286 m (−4,219 ft) | 15.102°S 173.677°W | Pleistocene |
| Fonuafo'ou | −17 m (−56 ft) | 20.32°S 175.42°W | 1936 |
| Fonualei | 180 m (591 ft) | 18.02°S 174.325°W | 1957 |
| Home Reef | −10 m (−33 ft) | 18.992°S 174.775°W | 2023 |
| Hunga Tonga–Hunga Ha'apai | 114 m (374 ft) | 20.57°S 175.38°W | 2022 |
| Kao | 1,030 m (3,379 ft) | 19.67°S 175.03°W | Holocene |
| Late | 540 m (1,772 ft) | 18.806°S 174.65°W | 1854 |
| Lobster | −1,500 m (−4,921 ft) | 15.333°S 176.283°W | - |
| Metis Shoal | 43 m (141 ft) | 19.18°S 174.87°W | 2019 |
| Niuafoʻou | 260 m (853 ft) | 15.60°S 175.63°W | 1985 |
| Niuatahi | −1,270 m (−4,167 ft) | 15.379°S 174.003°W | Unknown |
| Niuatoputapu | 157 m (515 ft) | 15.96°S 173.74°W | 3 million years ago |
| Northern Matas | −1,855 m (−6,086 ft) | 15.005°S 173.793°W | Pleistocene |
| Tafahi | 560 m (1,837 ft) | 15.85°S 173.72°W | Holocene |
| Tafu-Maka | −1,400 m (−4,593 ft) | 15.37°S 174.23°W | 2008 |
| Tofua | 515 m (1,690 ft) | 19.75°S 175.07°W | 2022 (Ongoing) |
| Unnamed (1) | −13 m (−43 ft) | 20.85°S 175.53°W | 1999 |
| Unnamed (2) | −500 m (−1,640 ft) | 21.38°S 175.65°W | 1932 |
| Volcano F | −40 m (−131 ft) | 18.325°S 174.365°W | 2019 |
| West Mata | −1,174 m (−3,852 ft) | 15.1°S 173.75°W | 2016 |
