= Fonualei =

Island in Tonga

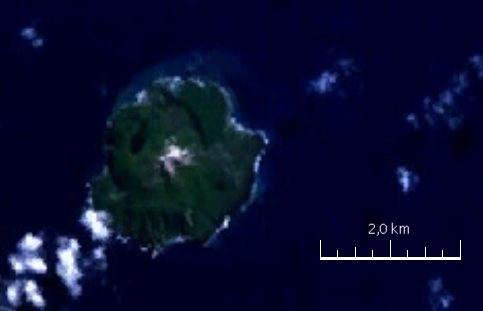
- image of Fonualei Island, northern Tonga, Pacific Ocean

Highest point
- Elevation: 188 m (617 ft)
- Listing: List of volcanoes in Tonga
- Coordinates: 18.024°S 174.325°W

Geography
- Location: Tonga Islands

Geology
- Formed by: Subduction zone volcanism
- Mountain type: Stratovolcano
- Last eruption: June 1957

Fonualei is an uninhabited volcanic island in the kingdom of Tonga. It 70 km northwest of Vavaʻu and is part of the highly active Kermadec-Tonga subduction zone and its associated volcanic arc, which extends from New Zealand north-northeast to Fiji, and is formed by the subduction of the Pacific Plate under the Indo-Australian Plate. The closest island to Fonualei is Tokū 19.7 km to the southeast.

== Geography ==
The island is the peak of an active volcano which rises 1000m from the seafloor. It has a diameter of 2 km and a maximum height of 188m. The coast is surrounded by cliffs, with only two beaches suitable for a landing. The western, southern, and north-eastern sides have narrow fringing reefs.

== History ==
In the 1830s the inhabitants of Tokū used Fonualei for their gardens.

The first European to sight the island was Don Francisco Mourelle de la Rua on the La Princesa on 26 February 1781. He reported the island to be barren from eruptions, and called it for that reason Amargura (Bitterness in Spanish). It was subsequently seen by La Pérouse on 27 December 1787, and by HMS Pandora during its hunt for the Bounty mutineers, who named it "Gardner’s Island".

A major eruption in 1846, starting 11 June, destroyed much of the vegetation of Vavaʻu and spread ash around for at least a year. Some sources claim that three other neighbouring volcanoes, Late, Tokū and another, erupted at the same time. This is probably a mistake by passing ships who misidentified the erupting island. Another eruption was reported in July 1938.

In the 1980s the island was leased for 30 years to the Chen family as part of a scheme to sell Tongan passports to wealthy foreigners.

In September 2022 scientists mapping marine life noted discolouration in the water near the island and emissions of sulphuric gases.

== Ecology ==
The island has been designated an Important Bird Area by BirdLife International. It is home to a large colony of Sooty terns. Other birds found on the island include the Tongan ground dove, Pacific imperial pigeon, Spotless crake, Australasian swamphen, Polynesian wattled honeyeater, and Polynesian starling. Sea- and shorebirds include the brown and red-footed Booby, the great and Lesser frigatebird, White tern, Red-tailed tropicbird, the black and brown Noddy, Pacific golden plover, and Bristle-thighed curlew. The only land-based mammal is the Insular flying fox. The island is rat-free.

In 1993 Fonualei was assessed as a potential habitat for the critically endangered Tongan megapode. 70 eggs and 10 chicks were translocated. The introduction was successful, and in 2003 the population was estimated at 300 to 500 birds. In 2013 it was estimated at 600 to 1,000 adults.

== See also ==
- List of volcanoes in Tonga
