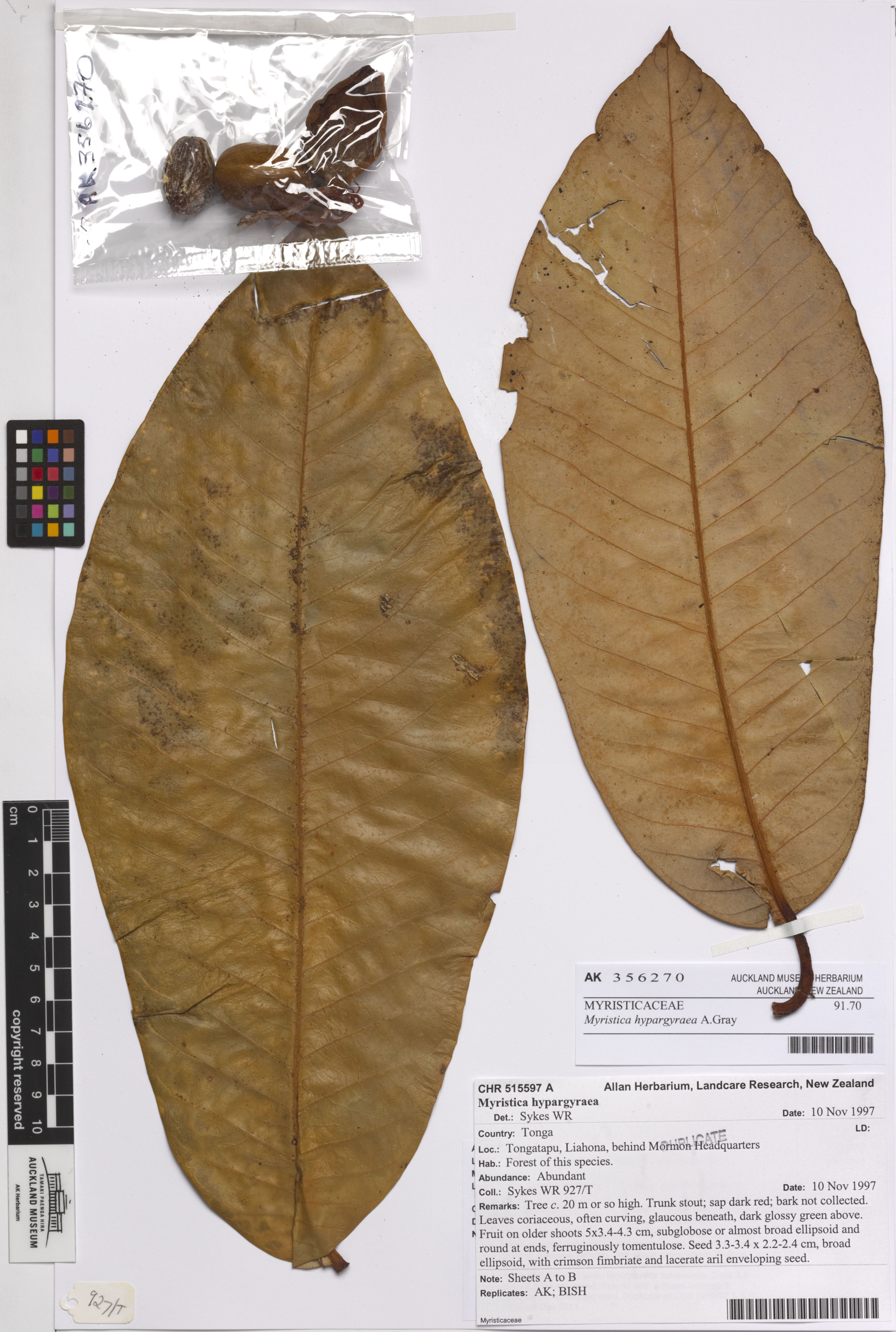

Conservation status
- Least Concern (IUCN 3.1)

Scientific classification
- Kingdom: Plantae
- Clade: Embryophytes
- Clade: Tracheophytes
- Clade: Spermatophytes
- Clade: Angiosperms
- Clade: Magnoliids
- Order: Magnoliales
- Family: Myristicaceae
- Genus: Myristica
- Species: M. hypargyraea

Binomial name
- Myristica hypargyraea A.Gray (1854)

Subspecies
- Myristica hypargyraea subsp. hypargyraea; Myristica hypargyraea subsp. insularis (Kaneh.) W.J.de Wilde

Synonyms
- species: Palala hypargyraea (A.Gray) Kuntze (1891); subsp. insularis: Myristica insularis Kaneh. (1933)

= Myristica hypargyraea =

Species of flowering plant

Myristica hypargyraea is a species of flowering plant in the nutmeg family, Myristicaceae. It is a tree native to the Caroline Islands, Samoan Islands, Tonga, and Wallis and Futuna. It grows up to 25 meters tall.

Two subspecies are accepted:

- Myristica hypargyraea subsp. hypargyraea – Samoan Islands, Tonga, and Wallis and Futuna
- Myristica hypargyraea subsp. insularis (Kaneh.) W.J.de Wilde – Caroline Islands

The Pacific imperial pigeon (Ducula pacifica) plays a significant role in the reproduction of the species by dispersing seeds.
