= Late (Tonga) =

Island of Tonga

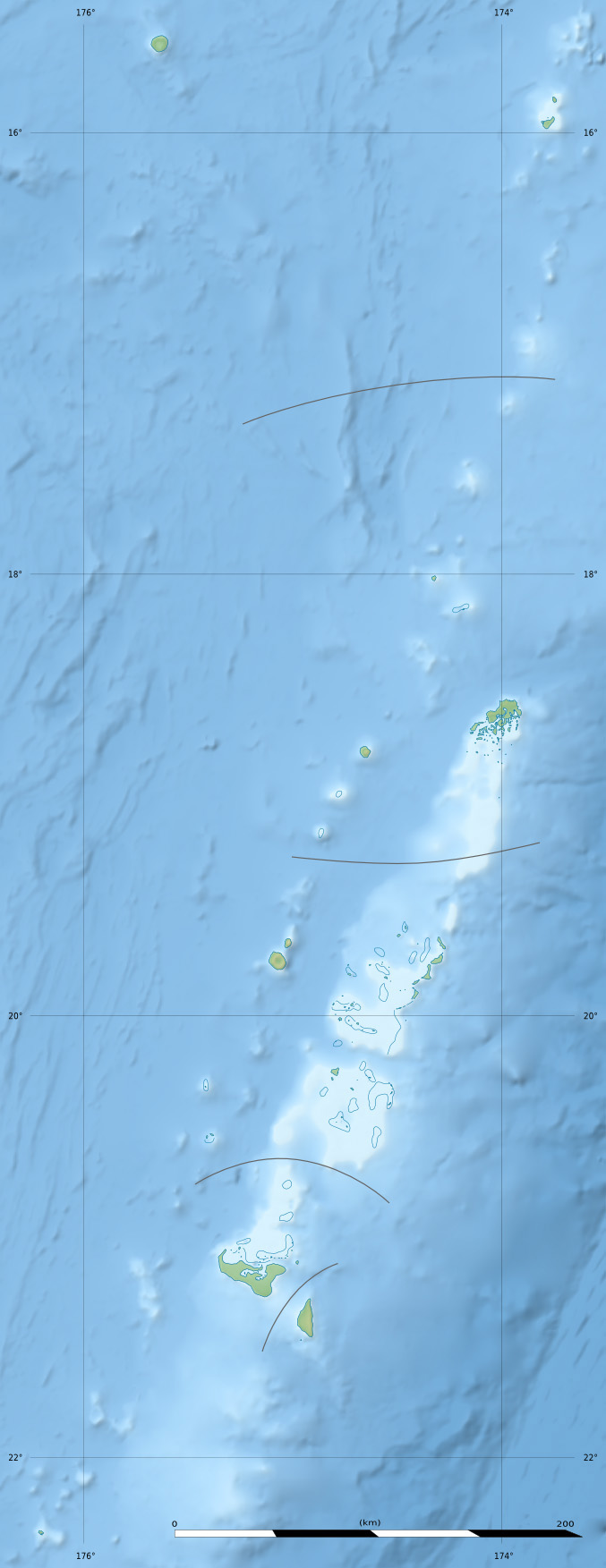
- Location within Tonga Location within Pacific Ocean

Highest point
- Elevation: 540 m (1,770 ft)
- Prominence: 540 m (1,770 ft)
- Coordinates: 18°48′14″S 174°38′53″W

Geography
- Location: Tonga

Geology
- Formed by: Subduction zone volcanism
- Mountain type: Stratovolcano
- Last eruption: 1854

Late Island is an uninhabited volcanic island in the kingdom of Tonga. Located 55km west-southwest of Vavaʻu, it is part of the highly active Tonga–Kermadec subduction zone and its associated volcanic arc, which extends from New Zealand north-northeast to Fiji, and is formed by the subduction of the Pacific Plate under the Indo-Australian Plate.

== Geography ==
The island is the peak of an active basaltic andesite to andesitic volcano which rises 1500m from the seafloor. It is 6km wide and roughly circular, with an area of 15 square kilometres and a conical summit 540m above sea level. There is a 400m wide, 150m deep summit crater with an ephemeral lake. There are two large craters on the north-east flank, one of which is filled by a lake.

== History ==
The first European to sight the island was Spanish naval officer Francisco Mourelle de la Rúa on 27 February 1781, on board of the frigate Princesa. Six years later it was explored by French explorer Jean-François de La Pérouse. It was again visited by British naval officer Edward Edwards in 1791 that named it Bickerston.

The island was formerly inhabited, but the population was moved to Vavaʻu around 1830 to avoid slave-traders. The descendents of the inhabitants now live on Hunga in the Vavaʻu group. In the late twentieth century kava plantations were established by the people of Ovaka, but there were no permanent inhabitants. The island was used as a penal colony in the 1970's.

Only two volcanic eruptions have occurred in historical time, both from NE-flank craters, which produced explosive activity and possible lava flows in 1790 and 1854.

== Ecology ==
Late's plant-life is relatively poor compared to other Tongan volcanic islands such as Tofua and Kao, but is also barely modified by humans. There are 145 taxa of indigenous vascular plants, and 49 taxa of introduced vascular plants.

The island has been designated an Important Bird Area by BirdLife International. Birds present include the Maroon shining parrot, Shy ground dove, Polynesian triller, Blue-crowned lorikeet, Crimson-crowned fruit dove, Many-colored fruit dove, Polynesian wattled honeyeater, Polynesian starling, Sargasso shearwater, and Tongan whistler. The Collared kingfisher, Red-footed booby, and Black noddy were also observed in 1990, and the Wedge-tailed shearwater, White-tailed tropicbird, Brown booby, Great frigatebird, Lesser frigatebird, Brown noddy, Fairy tern, Superb fruit dove, Pacific imperial pigeon, and White-rumped swiftlet were also reported.

In addition to birds, the island is home to two species of mammal (the Polynesian rat and the Insular flying fox) and four types of reptile (the skinks Emoia cyanura, Emoia pheonura, and Cryptoblepharus boutonii, and the Oceanic gecko).

In 1992 the Tongan government translocated a population of endangered Tongan megapodes to the island. A survey in 2004 failed to find any survivors. The devastation casued by Cyclone Waka was suggested as an explanation, but predation by rats was later blamed.

In an effort to protect the island's birdlife, the Tongan government began planning a rat-eradication campaign in 2016. The program was delayed by the COVID-19 pandemic and the 2022 erruption of Hunga Tonga–Hunga Haʻapai, but finally began in 2023, using air-dropped Brodifacoum poison. A survey in 2024 showed that bird numbers had doubled in the nine months since the poison drop.

== See also ==
- List of volcanoes in Tonga
