= Unnamed volcano 2 =

Volcano in Tonga

Unnamed (Volcano 2)

Highest point
- Prominence: −68 m (−223 ft)
- Coordinates: 21.338°S 175.65°W

Geography
- Location: Tonga
- Parent range: Tonga–Kermadec Ridge

Geology
- Formed by: Subduction zone volcanism
- Mountain type: Stratovolcano
- Last eruption: 1932

A submarine volcano of the Tonga–Kermadec Ridge, informally called Volcano 2, is situated southwest of Tongatapu. It lies 68 m (223 ft) beneath the surface and could be the cone of a larger volcano located 15 km (9.3 mi) northwest. An eruption in 1907 located 48 km (30 mi) from Tongatapu created pumice rafts while the most recent eruption occurred in 1932.
