= Tofua =

Volcanic island in Tonga

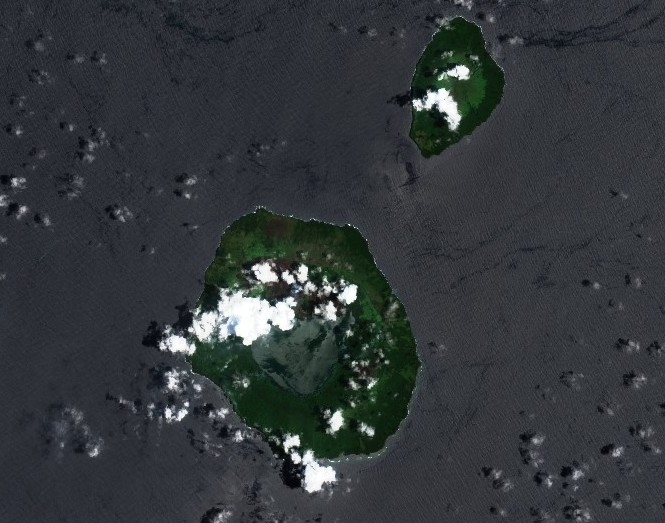
- Tofua Island (lower left) and neighbouring Kao Island, Tonga, Pacific Ocean

Highest point
- Elevation: 515 m (1,690 ft)
- Prominence: 515 m (1,690 ft)
- Listing: List of volcanoes in Tonga
- Coordinates: 19°45′00″S 175°04′30″W

Geography
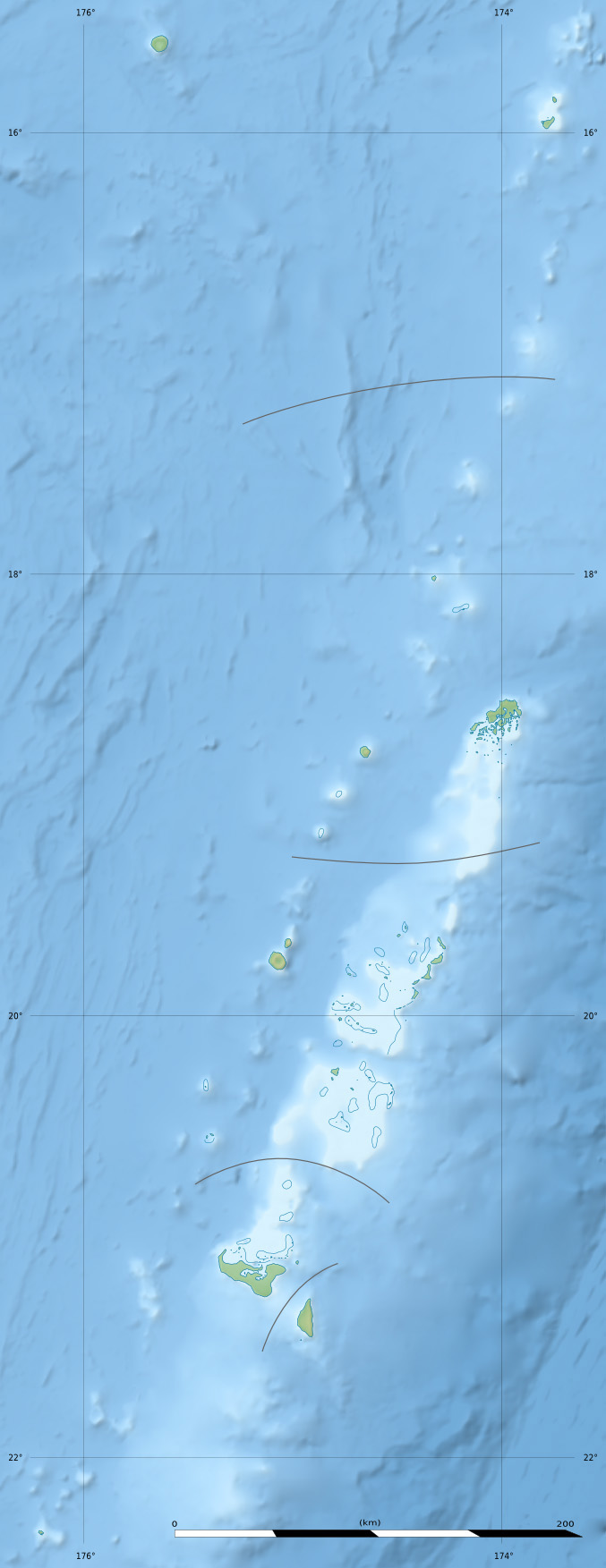
- Location within Tonga
- Location: Tonga Islands, Tonga

Geology
- Formed by: Subduction zone volcanism
- Mountain type: Caldera
- Last eruption: 2025 (Ongoing)

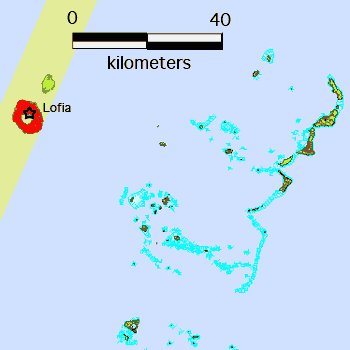
Tofua caldera

Tofua is a volcanic island in Tonga. Located in the Haʻapai island group, it is a steep-sided composite cone with a summit caldera. It is part of the highly active Kermadec-Tonga subduction zone and its associated volcanic arc, which extends from New Zealand north-northeast to Fiji, and is formed by the subduction of the Pacific Plate under the Indo-Australian Plate. It lies about 100 km (62 mi) above a very active seismic zone. It is connected to the nearby island of Kao by a submarine ridge. As of August 2025, the cone contains a lava lake.

The island is a national park.

== Geography and geology ==
The island is oval, measuring approximately 80 square kilometers. Its sides rise steeply to the rim of the caldera, which is partially filled by a volcanic crater lake with a depth of 500 m (1,600 ft). The caldera was formed by a major eruption around 1,000 years BP, which left deposits up to 0.5 metres (1 ft 8 in) thick on islands over 40 kilometres (25 mi) away.

Tofua's pre-caldera activity is recorded by a sequence of pyroclastic deposits and lavas constituting the older cone, followed on the northern part of the island by froth lavas or welded and unwelded ignimbrite. Following the caldera collapse, lavas were erupted from the northern part of the island and the caldera-rim fissure zone, scoria and lavas from the caldera-wall fissure zones, pyroclastics and lavas from intracaldera cones, and recent pyroclastic fall deposits on the outer cone. Eruptive products are mainly basaltic andesites and andesites, plus occasional dacite flows within the older cone. A postcaldera cone with fumarolic activity (Lofia) is in the northern part of the caldera

Most historical eruptions have been small explosions from Lofia cone along the northern caldera rim. The eruptions of 1958–59 caused most of the islanders to evacuate for a year or more.

An expedition filmed by PBS for the Nova popular science television program in 2023 sighted an active lava lake in the Lofia cone, with a further expedition in 2025 sighting the lake, which was estimated to be "slightly smaller than a basketball court".

== History ==
In 1774 Captain Cook sailed between Tofua and Kao, but did not land. He observed smoke rising from the island, and that "[the] brow of the Hill had been consumed by fire".

The Mutiny on the Bounty took place on 28 April 1789, about 30 nautical miles (56 km; 35 mi) from Tofua. After being cast off the ship, Captain William Bligh navigated the overcrowded 23-foot (7.0 m) open launch on an epic 41-day voyage first to Tofua and then to the Dutch East Indies port of Kupang on Timor equipped with a quadrant, a pocket watch, sextant and a compass. The mutineers refused them charts so Bligh had to navigate to Timor from memory. He recorded the distance as 3,618 nautical miles (6,701 km; 4,164 mi). He passed through the difficult Torres Strait along the way and reached Kupang on June 14. The only casualty on this voyage was a crewman named John Norton who was stoned to death by the natives of Tofua, the first island they tried to land on.

At Tofua (Bligh spelled it Tofoa), Bligh and eighteen loyalists sought refuge in a cave to augment their meager provisions. In the March 1968 issue of the National Geographic Magazine, Luis Marden claimed to have found this cave and the grave of John Norton. Both findings were later disproved by Bengt Danielsson (who had been a member of the 1947 Kon-Tiki expedition) in the June 1985 issue of the Pacific Islands Monthly. Danielsson identified Bligh's cave as lying on the sheltered northwest coast, where Bligh identified it; Marden's cave lies on the exposed southeast coast. Additionally, Danielsson thought it highly unlikely that the Tofuans would have allotted any grave site to Norton, or that the grave, if allotted, would have been preserved for two centuries.

At the time of the famous mutiny, HMS Bounty was in sight of the volcanic island of Tofua

In May 1943, a lifeboat containing 23 survivors from the Liberty ship SS Phoebe A. Hearst, which sank after being torpedoed by the Japanese submarine I19 on 30 April 1943, landed. The crew survived on shellfish and coconuts until spotted by a Lockheed Hudson patrol aircraft of the Royal New Zealand Air Force and were picked up the following day by the US Navy YMS-1-class minesweeper YMS-89 and taken to Tongatapu.

Tofua is no longer inhabited, but it is used for agriculture, specifically for the cultivation of Kava. The few people who occasionally stay on the island for this purpose use the huts of the abandoned village of Manaka on the east coast of the island as accommodation. Other settlements on the island were Hotaʻane in the west and Hokula in the north. In the 1996 census, five people were still counted, but since 2006, the island has been considered uninhabited.

In 2008–2009, the Swiss adventurer Xavier Rosset spent 10 months alone on the island. Having a camera, he turned his survivalist endeavor into a documentary called 300 Days Alone.

== The oral tradition of Kao and Tofua ==
E. W. Gifford, recording Tongan myths and tales in the 1920s, documented this explanation for Tofua's caldera and the creation of Kao Island to the north:

Three deities from Samoa, Tuvuvata, Sisi, and Faingaa, conspired to steal Tofua. So they came and tore up the high mountain by its very roots and its place was taken by a large lake. This enraged the Tongan gods very much and one of them, Tafakula, essayed to stop the thieves. He stood on the island of Luahako and bent over so as to show his anus. It shone so brilliantly that the Samoan deities were struck with fear, thinking that the sun was rising and that their dastardly works was about to be revealed. Hence, they dropped the mountain and fled to Samoa. The mountain became the island of Kao.

== Ecology ==
The island is the largest area of undisturbed Tongan tropical moist forests in Tonga, and was designated a national park in 2001. It has been designated an Important Bird Area by BirdLife International. Birds include the Many-colored fruit dove, Crimson-crowned fruit dove, Blue-crowned lorikeet, Polynesian wattled honeyeater, Polynesian triller, Fiji shrikebill, and Polynesian starling.

== See also ==
- List of volcanoes in Tonga
