= Cynometra grandiflora =

Conservation status
- Least Concern (IUCN 3.1)

Scientific classification
- Kingdom: Plantae
- Clade: Embryophytes
- Clade: Tracheophytes
- Clade: Angiosperms
- Clade: Eudicots
- Clade: Rosids
- Order: Fabales
- Family: Fabaceae
- Genus: Cynometra
- Species: C. grandiflora

Binomial name
- Cynometra grandiflora A.Gray (1854)

Synonyms
- Maniltoa amicorum A.C.Sm. (1959); Maniltoa brevipes A.C.Sm. (1950); Maniltoa grandiflora (A.Gray) Scheff. (1876)

Species of legume

Cynometra grandiflora is a species of plant in the family Fabaceae. It is a tree native to Fiji and Tonga.
