= Futuna Island =

Futuna Island may refer to

- Futuna (Wallis and Futuna), one of the Horne Islands
- Futuna (island of Vanuatu), an island in the Tafea province of Vanuatu

Futuna (Wallis and Futuna)

Futuna (island of Vanuatu)
