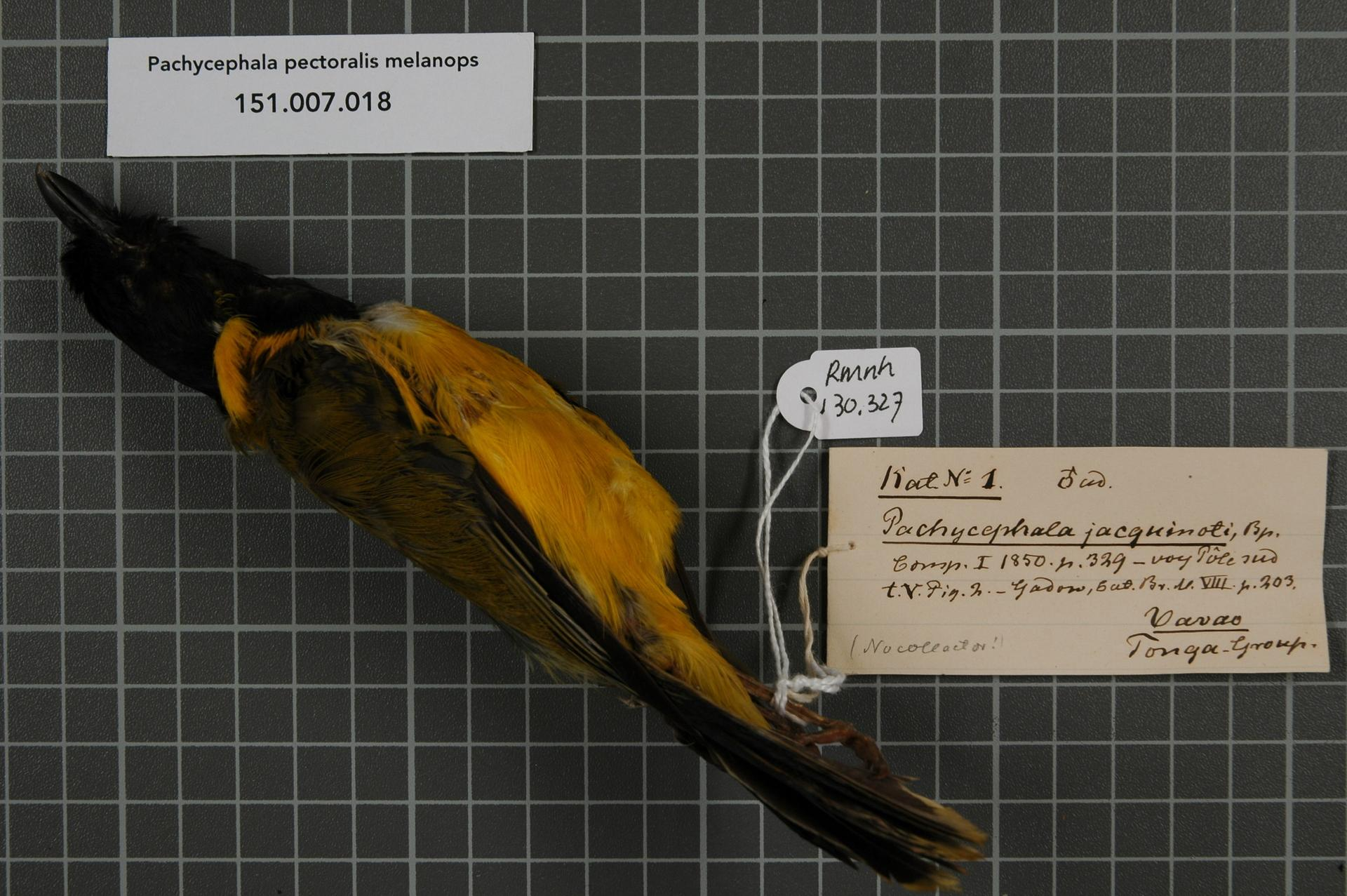

Conservation status
- Near Threatened (IUCN 3.1)

Scientific classification
- Kingdom: Animalia
- Phylum: Chordata
- Class: Aves
- Order: Passeriformes
- Family: Pachycephalidae
- Genus: Pachycephala
- Species: P. jacquinoti

Binomial name
- Pachycephala jacquinoti Bonaparte, 1850

Synonyms
- Pachycephala jaquinoti Bonaparte, CLJL, 1850; Pachycephala jacquinoti melanops Pucheran, J, 1853; Pachycephala melanops Pucheran, J, 1853; Pachycephala jacquinoti jacquinoti Bonaparte, CLJL, 1850; Pachycephala pectoralis melanops Bonaparte, CLJL, 1850

= Tongan whistler =

Species of bird

The Tongan whistler (Pachycephala jacquinoti) is a species of bird in the family Pachycephalidae. An endemic of Tonga, it is found in forests on the islands of Vava'u and Late. Adults reach an average length of 17–18.5 cm (6.7–7.3 in) and an average height of 33–39 cm (13–15 in). Adult males are yellow with black heads and olive-yellow backs, while females have olive-grey heads with a white throat and duller upperparts.

== Taxonomy ==
The Tongan whistler was also described by Jacques Pucheran in the genus Eopsaltria and has been variably considered as a subspecies of the golden whistler. The specific epithet jacquinoti was previously sometimes replaced by melanops, as some authorities erroneously considered the former to be a nomen nudum.

== Description ==
The Tongan whistler reaches an average length of 17–18.5 cm (6.7–7.3 in) and an average weight of 33–39 cm (13–15 in). Adult males have entirely black heads, down to the breast and nape. The underparts are yellow and the upperparts are olive-yellow, with a yellow collar on the neck separating the black and olive-yellow. The tail is blackish-brown, while the bill and legs are black. Females have a markedly different appearance, with a buff-hued olive-grey head, a white chin and throat, less vibrant olive-yellow upperparts, and an olive-yellow collar.

== Distribution and habitat ==
It is endemic to the islands of Vava'u and Late in Tonga. It is mainly found in tropical primary forest, but can sometimes be seen in second growth or wooded plantations.

== Conservation ==
The Tongan whistler is considered to be near-threatened by the IUCN. It is threatened by habitat loss.
