= Tokū, Tonga =

Island in Tonga

Coordinates: 18°9′30″S 174°10′50″W

Tokū is an uninhabited, volcanic island in Tonga. It is located in the very north of Vavaʻu group in the north of the country. It is about 1,000 metres (3,300 feet) long and up to 700 metres (2,300 feet) wide, yielding an area of 0.4 square kilometres (0.2 square miles). It is up to 21 metres (69 feet) above sea level at its summit.

The closest island is Fonualei 19.7 km to the northwest.

== History ==
The island was inhabited in the 1830s, the inhabitants living on Tokū and having gardens on Fonualei. Following the 1846 eruption of Fonualei they relocated to Utulei in Vavaʻu. Another eruption occurred in 1847 following an earthquake.

== See also ==
- Desert island
- List of islands
