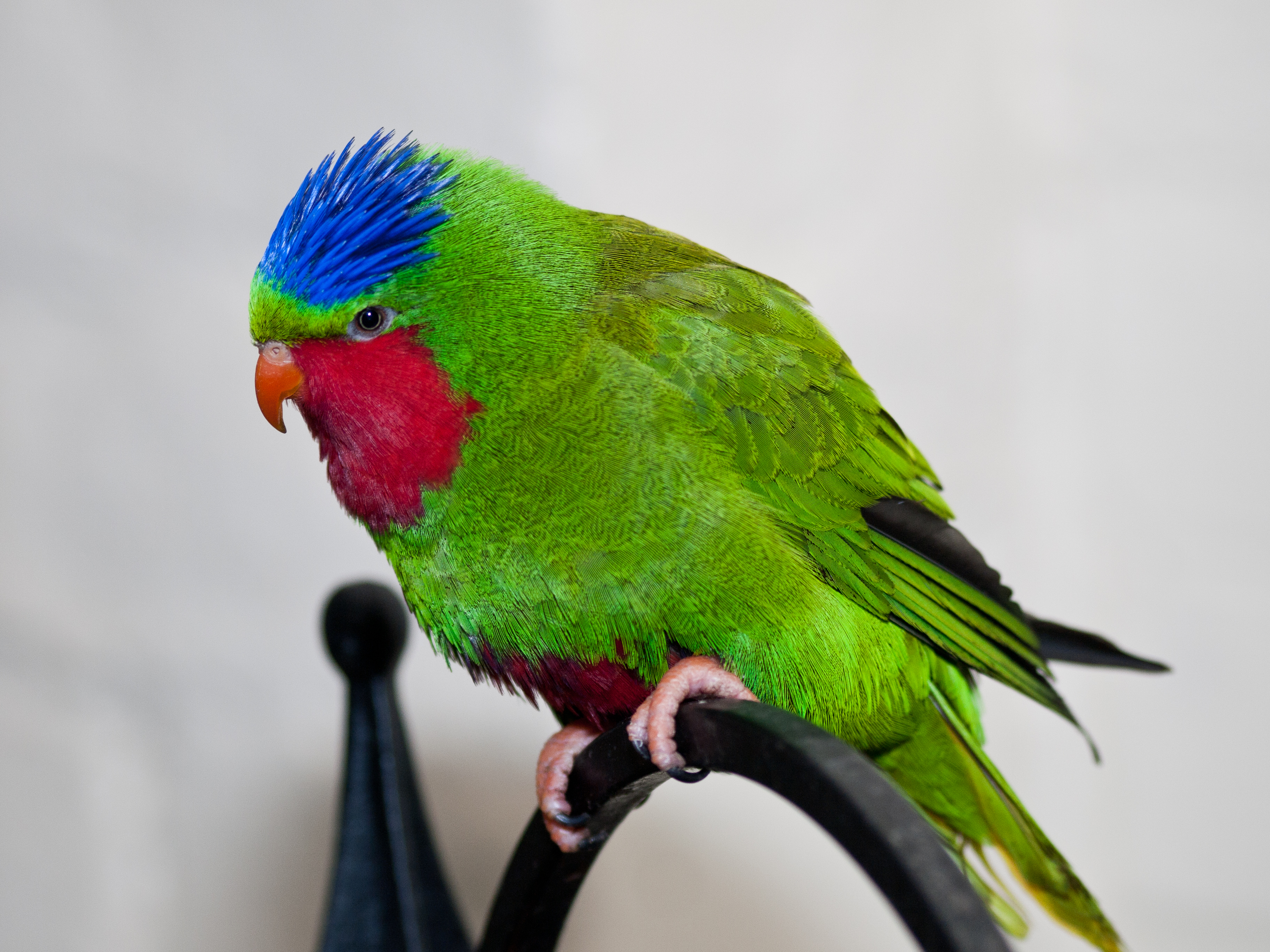

Conservation status
- Least Concern (IUCN 3.1)

Scientific classification
- Kingdom: Animalia
- Phylum: Chordata
- Class: Aves
- Order: Psittaciformes
- Family: Psittaculidae
- Genus: Vini
- Species: V. australis

Binomial name
- Vini australis (Gmelin, JF, 1788)

= Blue-crowned lorikeet =

Species of bird

The blue-crowned lorikeet (Vini australis), also known as the blue-crowned lory, blue-crested lory, Solomon lory or Samoan lory, is a parrot found In the Polynesian Islands of Samoa, Tonga, Fiji, and some other islands off the coast like Niue and Futuna. It is a 19 centimetres (7.5 in) green lorikeet with a red throat, blue crown, and belly patch shading from red at the top to purple at the bottom.

== Taxonomy ==
The blue-crowned lorikeet was formally described in 1788 by the German naturalist Johann Friedrich Gmelin in his revised and expanded edition of Carl Linnaeus's Systema Naturae. He placed it with all the other parrots in the genus Psittacus and coined the binomial name Psittacus australis. Gmelin based his description on the "Blue crested parrakeet" that had been described in 1781 by the English ornithologist John Latham in his A General Synopsis of Birds. Latham believed that his specimen had come from Hawaii (Sandwich Islands) but this was an error; the specimen had come from the Samoan Islands. The blue-crowned lorikeet is now placed in the genus Vini that was introduced in 1833 by the French naturalist René Lesson. The genus name is the Tahitian word for a local bird.

It is still common, but declining on some islands, apparently from predation by rats. They frequent areas with flowering trees, including coconut plantations and gardens, usually in small flocks of less than about 15 individuals or in pairs during breeding season. It eats nectar, pollen and soft fruits, especially wild hibiscus and coconut. The blue-crowned lory nests in holes in trees, but may also dig burrows in earth banks.
