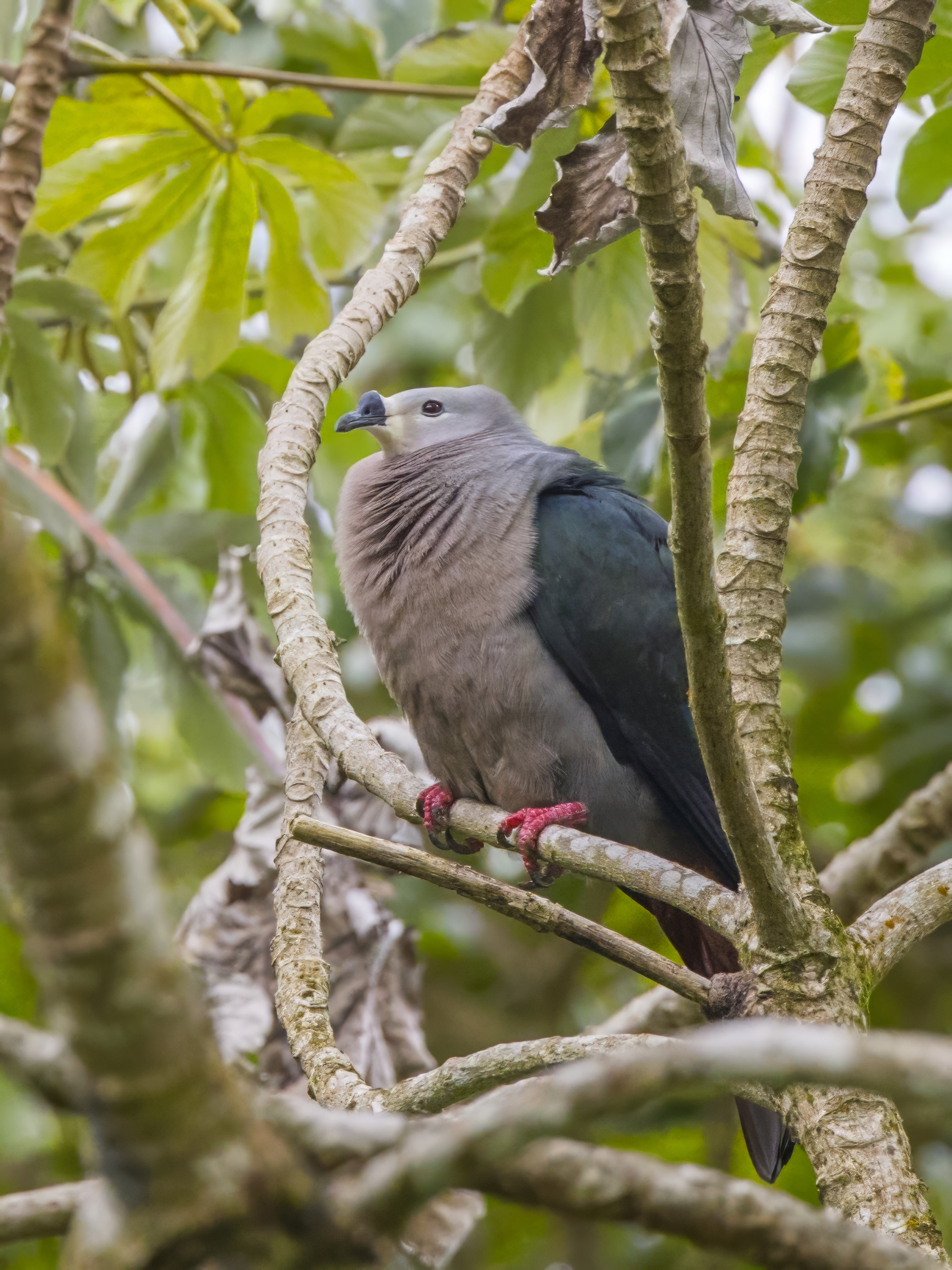

Conservation status
- Least Concern (IUCN 3.1)

Scientific classification
- Kingdom: Animalia
- Phylum: Chordata
- Class: Aves
- Order: Columbiformes
- Family: Columbidae
- Genus: Ducula
- Species: D. pacifica

Binomial name
- Ducula pacifica (Gmelin, JF, 1789)

= Pacific imperial pigeon =

Species of bird

The Pacific imperial pigeon, Pacific pigeon, Pacific fruit pigeon or lupe (Ducula pacifica) is a widespread pigeon species in the family Columbidae. It is found in American Samoa, the Cook Islands, the smaller islands of eastern Fiji, Kiribati, Niue, the smaller satellite islands of Papua New Guinea, Samoa, Solomon Islands, Tokelau, Tonga, Tuvalu, Vanuatu, and Wallis and Futuna Islands.

== Taxonomy ==
The Pacific imperial pigeon was formally described in 1789 by the German naturalist Johann Friedrich Gmelin in his revised and expanded edition of Carl Linnaeus's Systema Naturae. He placed it with all the other doves and pigeons in the genus Columba and coined the binomial name Columba pacifica. Gmelin based his description on the "Ferruginous-vented pigeon" from the "Friendly Isles in the South Seas" (now the Tonga Islands in the South Pacific) that had been described in 1783 by English ornithologist John Latham. The Pacific imperial pigeon is now placed with 40 other Imperial pigeons in the genus Ducula that was introduced in 1836 by the English naturalist Brian Houghton Hodgson. The genus name Ducula is from the Latin dux genitive ducis meaning "leader".

Two subspecies are recognised:

- D. p. sejuncta Amadon, 1943 – islets off north New Guinea to Western and St. Matthias is. (northwest, north-central Bismarck Archipelago) and Nissan Island (far northeast Bismarck Archipelago)
- D. p. pacifica (Gmelin, JF, 1789) – islets of Louisiade Archipelago to Solomon Islands, Fiji (southwest Polynesia), west and American Samoa (central Polynesia), Tonga and Niue (south-central Polynesia) and Cook Islands (east Polynesia)

== Description ==
The Pacific imperial pigeon is 36–41 cm (14–16 in) in overall length and weighs 370–420 g (13–15 oz). The back, tail and wings are blackish-green, the head and neck are light grey. The breast is grey with a pinkish tinge. The undertail coverts are brown. The bill is black with a knob on the upper mantle. The iris is red. The female is slightly smaller. The juvenile lacks the knob on the bill, is duller and lacks the pink on the breast.

== Distribution and habitat ==
Its natural habitats are tropical moist lowland forests on smaller islands and tropical moist montane forest on larger islands. It will travel across parts of its range between islands to forage. Individuals may gather to form large flocks in fruiting trees and travel some distances to forage.

== Behaviour ==
=== Food and feeding ===
The species is frugivorous, taking a number of different species of fruit, and occasionally leaves and flowers. In a study conducted in Tonga, Pacific imperial pigeons consumed the fruit of 38 species of plant across 24 families. They feed in individual trees for between 1-50 minutes, and generally travel short distances between trees, but can occasionally travel longer distances and even travel several km across water to other islands. The seeds of these plant foods are not digested or damaged, making the species an important seed disperser for the forests they occur in.

=== Breeding ===
Pairs nest in high trees, constructing a concealed, unlined untidy nest of twigs. Usually a single egg is laid, with incubation being undertaken by both sexes.

== Conservation status ==
The species has suffered from habitat loss and hunting pressure, and has declined locally in some areas, but it remains common over much of its range, and is listed as least concern by the IUCN. It is most vulnerable in smaller islands. It was hunted in prehistoric times in Tonga and Samoa with elaborate traps on stone platforms, and these hunts were of considerable cultural significance.

In Niue this breed is called a Lupe. It is a delicacy for the locals. It is now protected but people still hunt them. It is unknown where they breed or come from as no evidence of their nests have ever been found in Niue.
