= Hunga Tonga–Hunga Haʻapai =

Submarine volcano near Tongatapu, Tonga

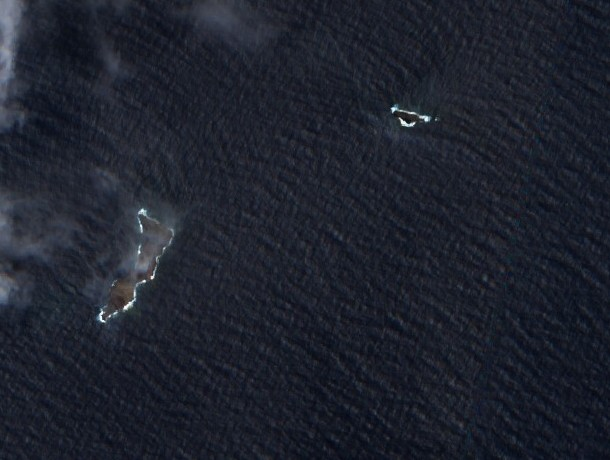
- The islands of Hunga Tonga (right) and Hunga Haʻapai (left), in February 2022

Highest point
- Elevation: 114 m (374 ft)
- Listing: List of volcanoes in Tonga
- Coordinates: 20°32′42″S 175°23′33″W

Geography
- Approximate extent of Hunga Tonga–Hunga Haʻapai caldera after January 2022 eruption
- Location: Tonga Islands

Geology
- Formed by: Subduction zone volcanism
- Mountain type: Submarine volcano
- Last eruption: 20 December 2021 – 15 January 2022 (VEI 5)

Hunga Tonga–Hunga Haʻapai is a submarine volcano in the South Pacific located about 30 km (19 mi) south of the submarine volcano of Fonuafoʻou and 65 km (40 mi) north of Tongatapu, Tonga's main island. It is part of the highly active Kermadec-Tonga subduction zone and its associated volcanic arc, which extend from New Zealand north-northeast to Fiji and is formed by the subduction of the Pacific Plate under the Indo-Australian Plate. It lies about 100 km (62 mi) above an active seismic zone. The volcano rises around 2,000 m from the seafloor and has a caldera that on the eve of the 2022 eruption was roughly 150 m (490 ft) below sea level and 4 km (2.5 mi) at its widest extent. The only major above-water parts of the volcano are the twin uninhabited islands of Hunga Tonga and Hunga Haʻapai, which are respectively part of the northern and western rims of the caldera. As a result of the volcano's eruptive history, the islands existed as a single landmass from 2015 to 2022; they were merged by a volcanic cone in a volcanic eruption in 2014–2015 and were separated again by a more explosive eruption in 2022, which also reduced the islands' size. The Hunga Tonga–Hunga Haʻapai volcano has seven historical recorded eruptions.

The most recent eruption, in January 2022, triggered a tsunami that reached the coasts of Japan and the Americas, along with a volcanic plume that soared 58 km (36 mi) into the mesosphere. It was the largest volcanic eruption since the 1991 eruption of Mount Pinatubo and the biggest explosion recorded in the atmosphere by modern instrumentation, far surpassing any 20th-century volcanic event or nuclear bomb test. NASA determined that the eruption was "hundreds of times more powerful" than the atomic bomb dropped on Hiroshima. The 1883 eruption of Krakatoa is believed to be the only eruption in recent centuries that rivaled the atmospheric disturbance it produced. The January 2022 eruption is the largest volcanic eruption in the 21st century.

== Volcano and caldera ==
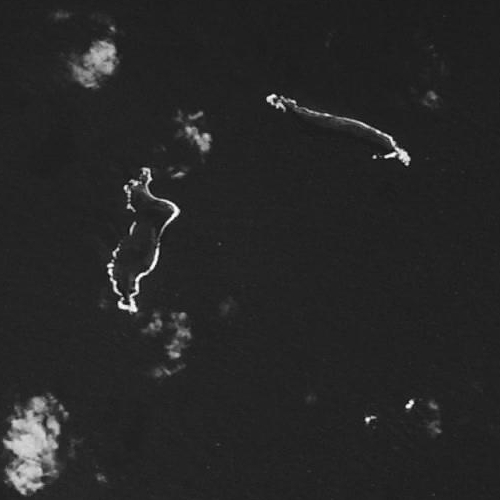
Hunga Tonga and Hunga Haʻapai in 1978

Hunga Tonga–Hunga Haʻapai is a submarine volcano in the Kermadec-Tonga Ridge in the South Pacific, a ridge formed by the convergent boundary where the Pacific Plate is subducted by the Indo-Australian Plate, forming a long volcanic island chain. Hunga Tonga–Hunga Haʻapai volcano lies almost completely underwater, with the exception of two small volcanic islands, Hunga Tonga and Hunga Haʻapai. They are, respectively, the remnants of the northern and western rims of the volcano's caldera.

The volcano's base at the seafloor is about 20 km in diameter, rising roughly 2,000 m towards the sea surface. Before the 2022 eruption, the volcano's caldera was roughly 150 m below sea level and had a size of 4 × 2 km. Its northern and southern portions were filled by volcanic deposits from previous eruptions. The caldera is believed to have been formed by this eruption. Before the 2015 eruption, the two subaerial islands were about 1.6 km (0.99 mi) apart, and were each about 2 km (1.2 mi) long. They are both composed largely of andesite and layered tephra deposits, with steep, rocky cliffs. This andesite tends to be of the basaltic type. The 2009 eruption arose from two vents located to the south and northwest of Hunga Haʻapai. The tephra deposited around each vent became connected to the island and nearly tripled its size, but such deposits disappeared with erosion in the following months. Bathymetric data indicate the growth of lava domes along the western caldera rim and mass movements on the northwestern rim between 2008 and 2016. The volcano is also frequently recorded by hydrophones when it generates acoustic noise underwater.

== Geography ==
=== Islands ===
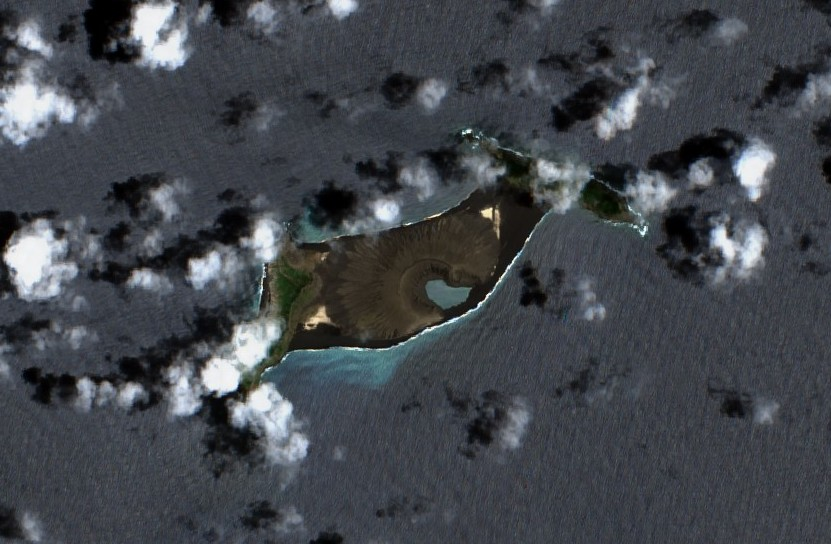
Hunga Tonga and Hunga Haʻapai on 20 December 2021 (the only major subaerial part of the volcano) formed a single island from 2015 to 2022.

Hunga Tonga–Hunga Haʻapai are the only subaerial parts of the volcano. Hunga Tonga is the eastern island, while Hunga Haʻapai is the western one. They are part of Tonga's Haʻapai group of islands, an island arc formed at the convergent boundary where the Pacific Plate subducts under the Indo-Australian Plate.

Before the 2014–15 eruption, which connected them into a single island, they were separated by about 1.6 km (0.99 mi) of ocean water. Before the 2022 eruption, the highest point in the former Hunga Tonga reached an elevation of 149 m (489 ft), while Hunga Haʻapai was only 128 m (420 ft) above sea level. Neither island was large; before they were connected in 2015, each island was about 2 km (1.2 mi) long, with Hunga Tonga being roughly 390,000 m^{2} (0.15 sq mi) and Hunga Haʻapai being 650,000 m^{2} (0.25 sq mi) in size. They are much smaller after the 2022 eruption. Neither island was developed due to a lack of an acceptable anchorage, although large guano deposits were on each island.

After the 2015 eruption, the smaller Hunga Tonga island, about 1.5 km (0.93 mi) to the northeast of Hunga Haʻapai, became attached to the crater by a 380 m (1,250 ft) wide tombolo, and further sandy deposits had built up at the southern end of the crater's connection with Hunga Haʻapai. The caldera itself has eroded rapidly in the southeast, originally allowing an opening that flooded the crater with seawater to form a bay. This bay later became separated from the open ocean by a shallow sandbar, forming a lagoon. Initially, the entire island was thought to erode rapidly, but by 2017, scientists believed that the process could take decades.

The islands figure in Tongan mythology as some of the few islands that were not overfished, hence they thrown down from heaven to land on earth. Tongans called them the islands that "jump back and forth" (i.e. suffer earthquakes). The first Europeans to see the islands were those with the Dutch explorers Willem Schouten and Jacob Le Maire in 1616. British explorer Captain James Cook visited them several times in 1777 and learned their Tongan names.

==== Scientific study ====
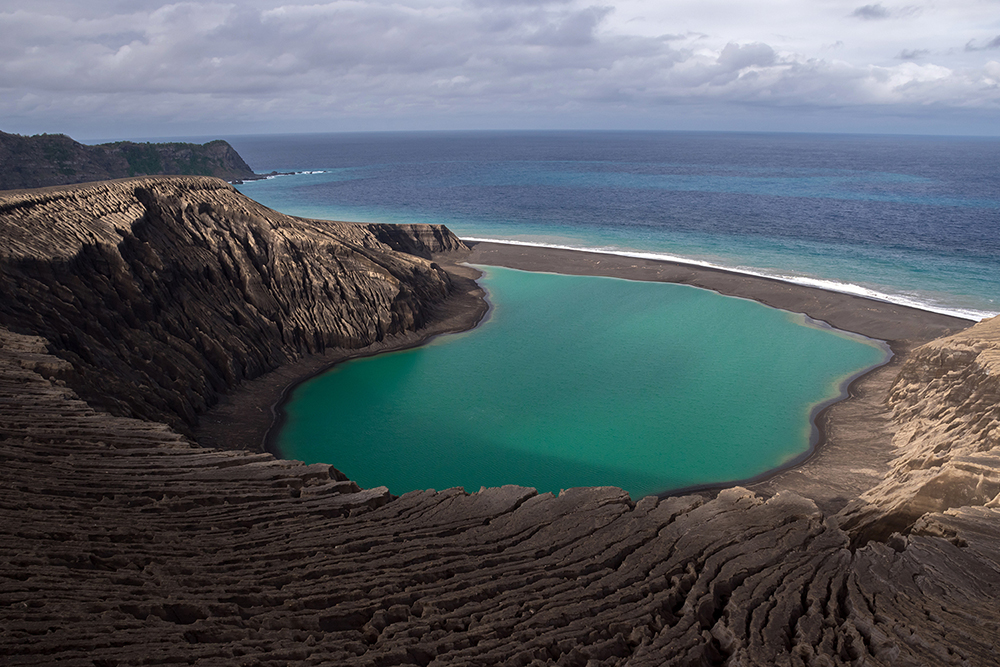
View from the summit of Hunga Tonga – Hunga Haʻapai in June 2017

In June 2017, French explorers Cécile Sabau and Damien Grouille landed on the island from their sailing boat Colibri. Aside from taking some of the very few pictures of the island before it was decimated by the 2022 eruption, they collected 16 rock samples, documented with GPS plotting and three-dimensional photos. This material was studied by scientists at NASA's Goddard Space Flight Center, led by Dr James B. Garvin. They studied Hunga Tonga–Hunga Haʻapai, using it as a model for volcanic shapes on Mars, and concluded that it eroded in ways that are remarkably similar to the erosion patterns seen on similar landforms on Mars. This suggested Mars was once flooded briefly by water, but that the water receded fairly quickly.

Another analysis of the samples showed that the volcanic ash that forms much of Hunga Tonga–Hunga Haʻapai reacted with the warm oceanic water around it, which turned the ash into much harder rock, and volcanologists believed the island would last for several decades rather than be eroded. This made Hunga Tonga–Hunga Haʻapai only the third volcanic island in the last 150 years to survive more than a few months.

In October 2018, scientists visited the island and discovered that its surface was covered with gravel, sticky mud, and vegetation. The island was also populated by a variety of birds. They also found that the island seemed to be eroding more quickly than previously thought due to rainfall. The survey also found that coral reefs around the volcano quickly recovered from the eruption.

==== Ecosystem ====
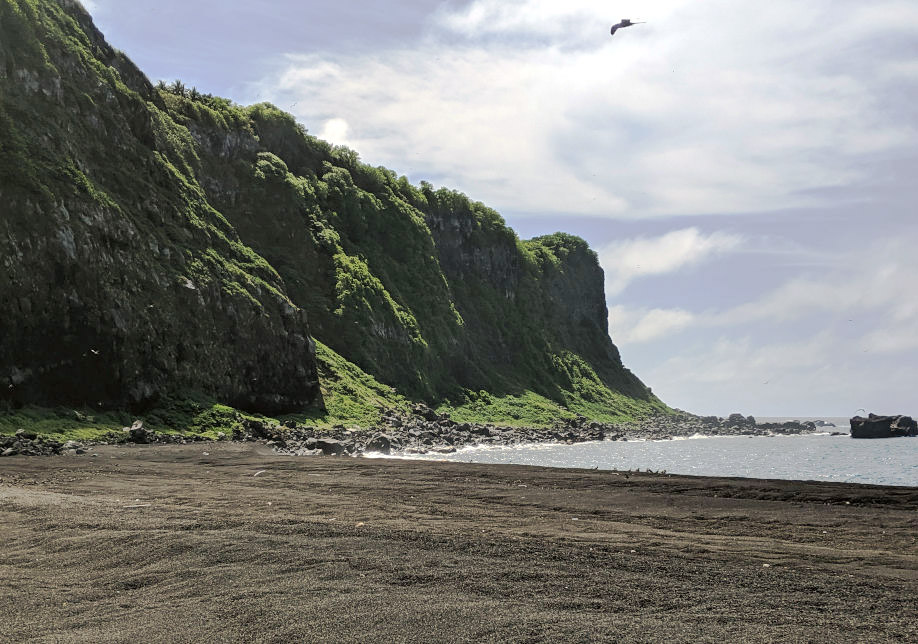
Landscape of the islands

Surveys in 2019 found ferns, guava trees, mosses, sedges, silky jackbean, and Asteraceae species growing on the island formed in 2014 and on Hunga Tonga–Hunga Haʻapai . Cockroaches, hermit crabs, moths, rats, and spiders lived on the islands. Nearby marine animals included humpback whales, reef sharks, sea snakes, whale sharks, and numerous fish species.

Before it was destroyed by the 2022 eruption, Hunga Tonga–Hunga Haʻapai was covered with grasslands, coconuts, and bush. The islands are a breeding ground for seabirds; bird species identified include barn owls, brown boobies, brown noddies, great frigatebirds, lesser frigatebirds, Pacific golden plovers, Polynesian starlings, red-footed boobies, red-tailed tropicbirds, ruddy turnstones, sooty terns, and white-tailed tropicbirds.

The dominant coral genera around Hunga Tonga–Hunga Haʻapai are Acropora, Pocillopora, and Porites. Volcanic activity has changed coral reefs around the islands, but impacts are locally variable, and robust recruitment of new corals is happening at numerous sites where they were wiped out. Birds quickly resettle after volcanic eruptions, as well.

== Eruptions ==
=== Before the 21st century ===
Hunga Tonga–Hunga Haʻapai erupted underwater at its rocky shoal in 1912 and 1937, and south of this shoal in 1988. During the 1988 eruption, three vents formed a 100–200 m (330–660 ft) long alignment and produced ash, steam, and tephra. One pyroclastic flow was dated to 1040–1180 CE, correlating to ash deposits found on Tongatapu and to an unknown tropical eruption in 1108 CE that had produced 1 °C of global cooling.

=== 2009 eruption ===
On 16 March 2009, a submarine eruption near Hunga Tonga–Hunga Haʻapai began spewing steam, smoke, pumice, and ash thousands of feet into the sky. (Note: The date the eruption began is uncertain. According to the Smithsonian Institution's Global Volcanism program, "Observers flying near the area of Hunga Tonga–Hunga Haʻapai (about 62 km NNW of Nukuʻalofa, the capital of Tonga) on 16 or 17 March reported seeing an eruption." The report cites Keizo Gates's web log, dated 16 March 2009, which contains photos allegedly taken from civilian aircraft late on the afternoon of March 16. The Smithsonian subsequently confirmed that the eruption began on 16 March.) The eruption devastated Hunga Haʻapai, covering it in black ash and stripping it of flora and fauna. Between 18 and 20 March, a number of Surtseyan eruptions sent ash plumes as high as 4.0 to 5.2 km (2.5 to 3.2 mi) into the atmosphere, with prevailing winds pushing the ash cloud about 480 km (300 mi) east-northeast of the eruption site and widespread and significant haze reported at Vavaʻu 255 km (158 mi) away. Steam plumes on 20 March were measured at 1.8 km (1.1 mi) above sea level. By 21 March, Tonga's chief geologist, Kelepi Mafi, reported lava and ash issuing from two vents – one on the uninhabited island Hunga Haʻapai and another about 100 m (330 ft) offshore. The eruption had filled the gap between the two vents, creating new land surface that measured hundreds of m^{2}.

Two Air New Zealand airline flights into Tonga were delayed due to safety concerns caused by the volcanic ash, but flight schedules returned to normal shortly thereafter. Tongan officials also expressed concern that the eruption could harm the country's fishing industry significantly. The volcanic eruption drew worldwide attention; the volcano was featured in a segment of the television program Angry Planet in 2009.

=== 2014–2015 eruption ===
Animation of the changes in the islands' shapes between 2000 and 2022

A new eruption began at Hunga Tonga–Hunga Haʻapai on 19 December 2014. Local fishermen reported a tall, white steam plume rising from the ocean over the undersea volcanic mount. Satellite images taken on December 29 showed the eruption continuing, with a smoke and ash plume rising from the site, and discolored seawater (possibly caused by smoke and ash released below the surface, or by disturbance of the seabed). The eruption continued into 2015, with a tall ash cloud rising 3 km (9,800 ft) into the sky on 6 January 2015.

The eruption entered a new stage on 11 January 2015, when the volcano began sending ash plumes as high as 9 km (30,000 ft) into the sky. An Air New Zealand flight on 12 January had to be diverted to Samoa, while a number of other flights between New Zealand and Tonga were cancelled. An ash plume reached 4.5 km (15,000 ft) on 13 January. Officials identified two vents, one on Hunga Haʻapai and another about 100 m (330 ft) offshore and underwater. Large rocks and wet, dense ash were being ejected up to 400 m (1,300 ft) into the air. By 16 January, a new island had been formed by the explosion. Tongan officials estimated the new island to be 1 km (0.62 mi) wide, 2 km (1.2 mi) long, and 100 m (330 ft) high, although geologists said the new island would probably exist only a few months until ocean waves wore it down. Ash and acid rain were falling in an area about 10 km (6.2 mi) from the new island, and Hunga Tonga and Hunga Haʻapai had both been denuded of vegetation. Despite the volcano's eruption, which was spewing a steam cloud 1 km (0.62 mi) into the air, international flights to Tonga resumed on 16 January, as volcano and aviation experts deemed the eruption no longer a threat to airliners.

Geologists from Tonga and New Zealand who visited the volcano on 19 January said the eruption had quieted in the previous 24 hours. They noted that nearly all the eruption was now coming from the vent on the new island, with steam clouds rising to a height of 7–10 km (4.3–6.2 mi), and ash and rock being thrown to a height of about 200–300 m (660–980 ft). Emission of ash was limited, with magma rocks hitting the ocean, causing some steam explosions. The team found no floating volcanic debris, such as pumice rafts, and the smell of volcanic gases was intermittent. Tongan officials established a zone 20 km (12 mi) in diameter around the island to protect visitors from rock, ash, and acid rain.

Tongan officials declared the eruption at an end on 26 January, after observing no new gas, ash, or rock emerging from the island vent. By this time, the island was 1 to 2 km (0.62 to 1.24 mi) wide, 2 km (1.2 mi) long, and 120 m (390 ft) high. The new island had joined with Hunga Haʻapai and was about 200 m (660 ft) away from joining with Hunga Tonga. Locals visiting the island said seabirds were nesting. In June 2015, entrepreneur Ian Argus Stuart became the first person to spend a night on this new island formation. Over 11 nights on the island, Stuart survived eating nothing but seagull eggs and squid. He went to Hunga Tonga with the help of Spanish explorer Álvaro Cerezo, who provides castaway experiences to remote desert islands around the planet.

=== December 2021–January 2022 eruption ===
Satellite animation of the initial ash plume and shockwave on 15 January

On 20 December 2021, the volcano erupted, causing a large plume that was visible from Nukuʻalofa. The Volcanic Ash Advisory Centre Wellington issued an advisory to airlines. Explosions could be heard up to 170 km (110 mi) away. The initial eruption continued until 2 am on 21 December. Activity continued, and on 25 December, satellite imagery showed that the island had increased in size.

As activity on the volcano decreased, it was declared dormant on 11 January before restarting on 14 January after the volcano sent an ash cloud 20 km (12 mi). The Tongan government subsequently issued a tsunami warning. On the next day, the volcano violently erupted again, about seven times more powerfully than the eruption on 20 December 2021. The initial volcanic plume rose to 58 km (36 mi) into the mesosphere, the greatest height ever reported for a vapor plume. Numerous loud booms were reported across Tonga and other countries, such as Fiji, and as far away as New Zealand and Australia. A boom was heard in Alaska, 10,000 km (6,200 mi) from the source seven hours after eruption. The Met Office in the UK also detected shockwaves from the eruption. The eruption set off a massive atmospheric shock-wave travelling at about 300 m (980 ft) per second. The energy released by the eruption has been calculated using various methods, which have led to a range of values. While one study estimated a release equivalent to 61 megatons of TNT (Mt), more powerful than the largest nuclear bomb ever detonated, another study proposed at least five blasts, two of relatively small size around 4:00 UTC (<0.1 Mt) and three increasingly larger ones at 4:06 (0.5 Mt), 4:18 (4 Mt), and 4:56 (15 Mt). Near the eruption, the explosion damaged property, including shattered windows. A tsunami warning was issued just after 5:30 pm by the Tonga Meteorological Services, and the tsunami flooded coastal areas in Tonga.

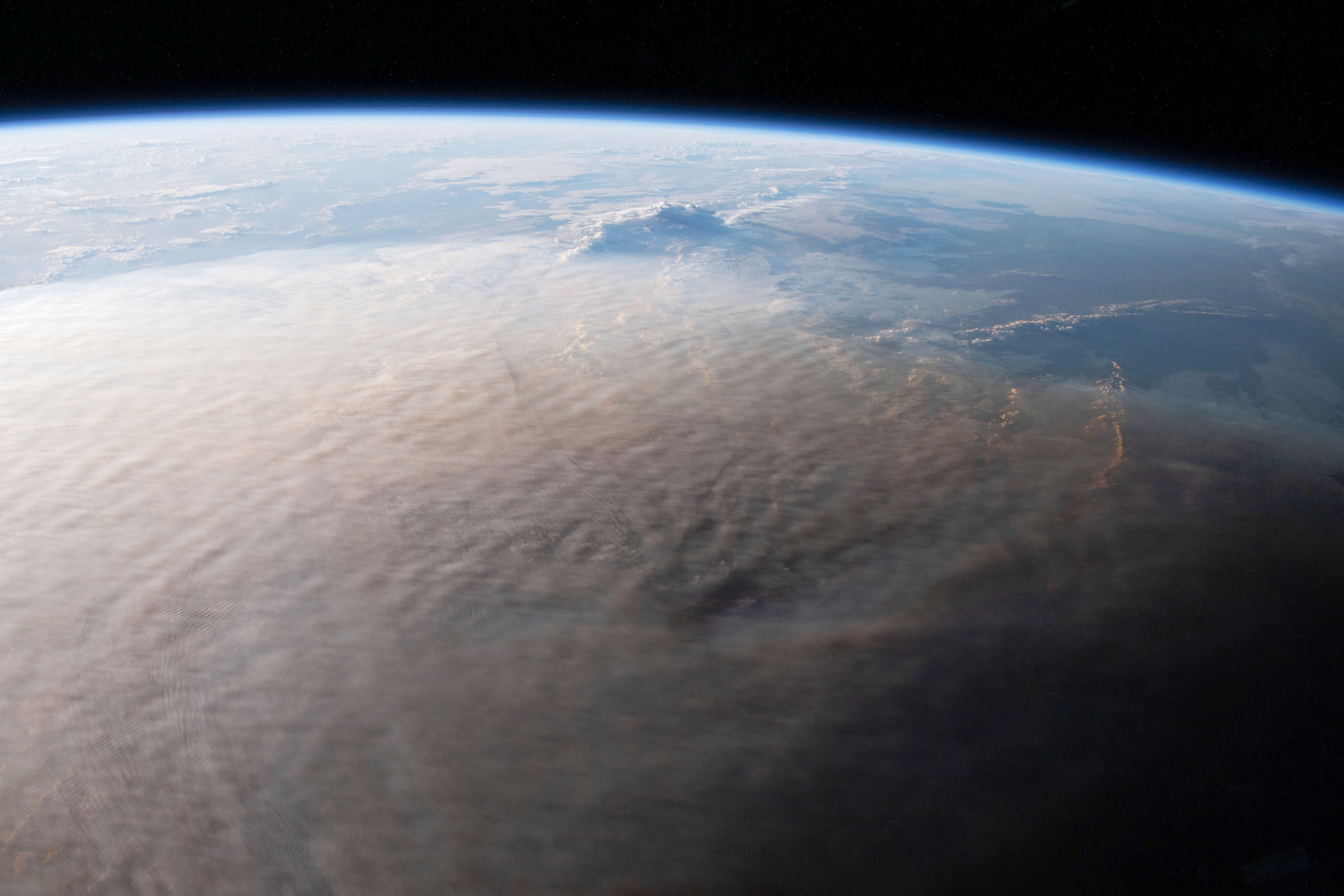
An image from the International Space Station of the spreading, high-altitude smoke cloud

Two people were killed in Peru and two fishermen were injured in San Gregorio, California. Four deaths were confirmed in Tonga, including a British woman whose body was found after she went missing when the tsunami struck. According to a report in the journal Geophysical Research Letters, while comparable to other volcanic eruptions on some measures, the 2022 Hunga Tonga–Hunga Haʻapai eruption sent unprecedented amounts of water vapor into the stratosphere. On 15 January, a satellite radar survey showed that most of the island had been destroyed; only small parts remained. These included remnants of Hunga Tonga and Hunga Haʻapai. A survey of the caldera by a remotely operated vehicle in August 2022 found continuing signs of volcanic activity.

In August 2022, a NASA report on the January 2022 eruption of Hunga Tonga–Hunga Haʻapai stated, "The huge amount of water vapor hurled into the atmosphere, as detected by NASA's Microwave Limb Sounder, the excess water vapor injected by the Tonga volcano... could remain in the stratosphere for several years... may have a small, temporary warming effect... would not be enough to noticeably exacerbate climate change effects." Later, the excess water vapor from the 2022 eruption was shown to remain in the stratosphere for about 8 years, and to help make the 2023 ozone hole one of the largest and most persistent in history. In addition, research suggests that the water vapor could influence winter weather across the globe for several years.

A study published in AGU Advances, led by Ruoxi Li of the University of Science and Technology of China, showed that the eruption generated primary gravity waves, which in turn led to secondary gravity waves that disrupted the orbits of satellites and even affected GPS signals.

The Global Facility for Disaster Reduction and Recovery reported that 600 buildings, including 300 homes, were damaged or destroyed by the tsunami. The Ministry of Finance estimated the agricultural damage was T$17.3 million (US$7.38 million). The World Bank revealed that 85% of the population was affected by the volcanic eruption and the subsequent tsunami. Damage was estimated to be T$421 million (US$182 million) — about 36.4% of Tonga's gross domestic product.

== See also ==
- List of volcanoes in Tonga
- List of islands and towns in Tonga
- Surtsey, another recently formed volcanic island in Iceland
- Krakatau
- Santorini
- List of large volcanic eruptions
