= Kao (island) =

Volcanic island and stratovolcano in Tonga

Kao (volcano)
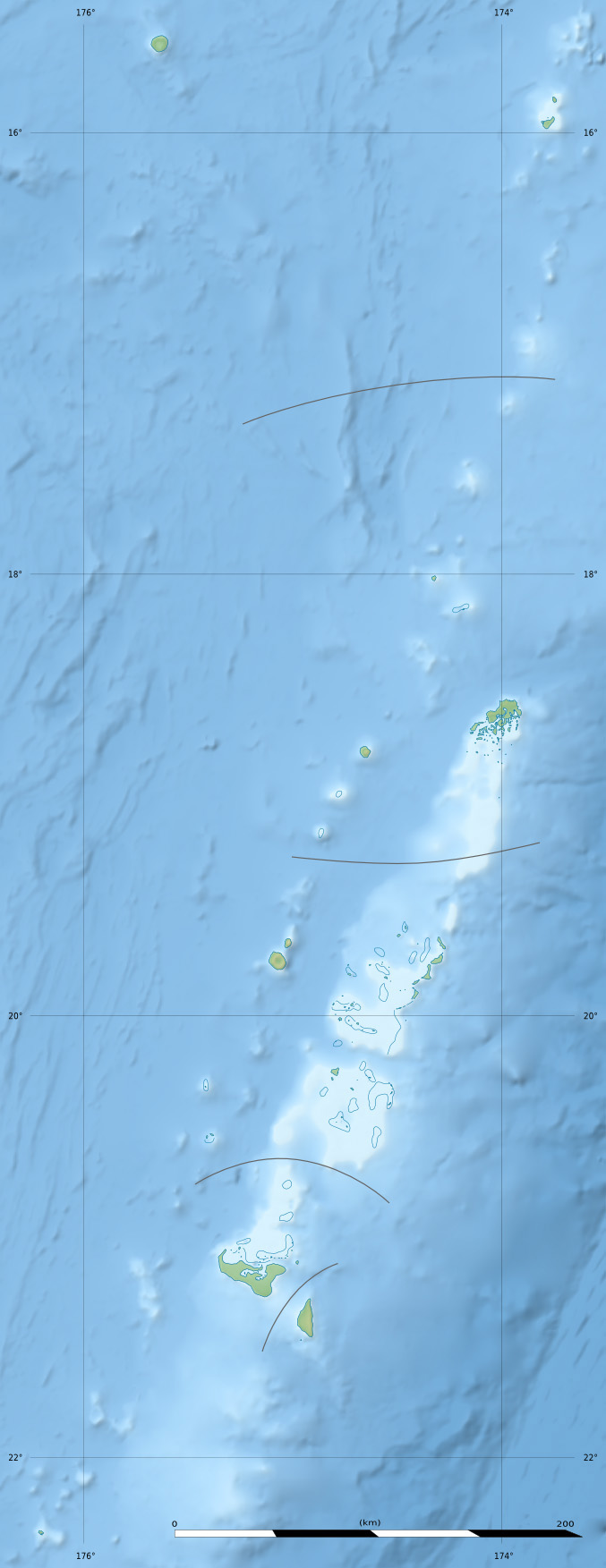
- Location within Tonga Location within Pacific Ocean

Highest point
- Elevation: 1,030 m (3,380 ft)
- Prominence: 1,030 m (3,380 ft)
- Listing: Country high point
- Coordinates: 19°40′12″S 175°01′48″W

Geography
- Location: Tonga

Geology
- Formed by: Subduction zone volcanism
- Mountain type: Stratovolcano
- Last eruption: 1847

Kao is an island and stratovolcano in the Haʻapai island group of Tonga. It lies about 6 km (3.7 mi) north of Tofua island and reaches 1,030 m (3,379 ft) above sea level, the highest point in Tonga.

The date of its last eruption is unknown. Although Kao does not display fresh-looking lava flows, it is likely very recent in origin due to the absence of deep gullies or high sea cliffs. The slopes of the island rise at angles exceeding 35 degrees to the summit, which has a series of small volcanic craters. The last reported eruption was on July 10, 1847.

The best access to Kao is by small boat on the south coast of the island, although heavy swell can make this treacherous and a skilled boat coxswain is required. There are no permanent paths to the summit. Small areas on the lower slopes are cultivated by kava growers. The island is densely jungled on its lower flanks, interspersed with thick chest-height ferns that are virtually impassable to all but the most determined trekkers armed with machetes and a good deal of stamina. Although just passable, the jungle area itself ends with a tree line at approximately 400 meters up the mountain, a brief belt of more thick fern gives way to shorter fern growth. However, 75 meters from the summit, the thick fern returns. Kao is an exceptionally difficult hike and climb. There are many gullies and ravines, some covered in plant growth, difficult to see and treacherous.

== The oral tradition of Kao and Tofua ==
E. W. Gifford, recording Tongan myths and tales in the 1920s, documented this explanation for Tofua's caldera and the creation of Kao Island to the north:

Three deities from Samoa, Tuvuvata, Sisi, and Faingaa, conspired to steal Tofua. So they came and tore up the high mountain by its very roots and its place was taken by a large lake. This enraged the Tongan gods very much and one of them, Tafakula, essayed to stop the thieves. He stood on the island of Luahako and bent over so as to show his anus. It shone so brilliantly that the Samoan deities were struck with fear, thinking that the sun was rising and that their dastardly work was about to be revealed. Hence, they dropped the mountain and fled to Samoa. The mountain became the island of Kao.

== See also ==
- Geography of Tonga
- List of volcanoes in Tonga
