= Tonga–Kermadec subduction zone =

Convergent plate boundary that stretches from the North Island of New Zealand northward

Coordinates: 32°S 180°E

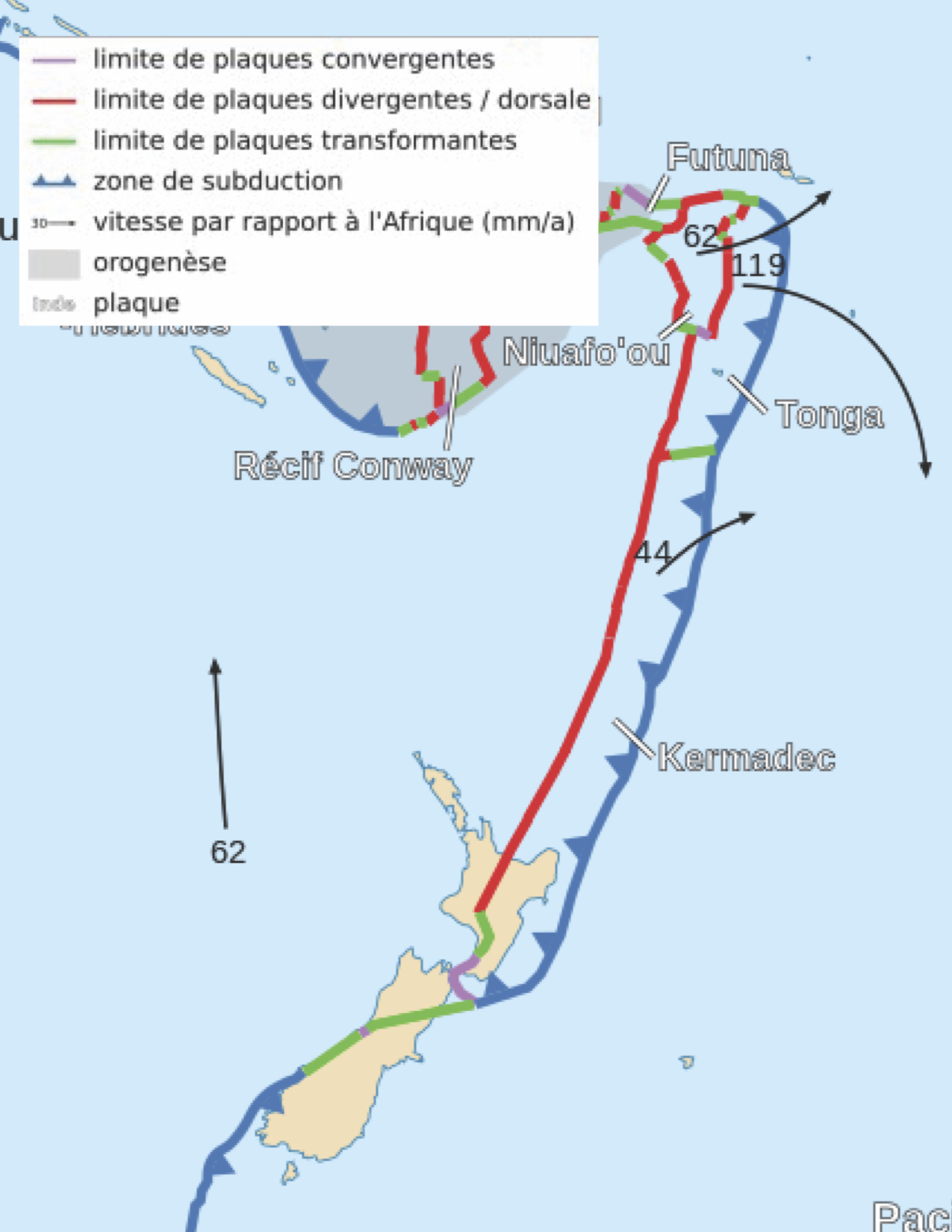
Kermadec and Tonga plates

Approximate surface projection of Australia plate and Pacific plate subduction in the South Pacific. Key: Shallow back arc earthquakes less than 70 km (43 mi) deep Up to 70 km (43 mi) deep subduction shallow-focus earthquakes 70–300 km (43–186 mi) deep shallow-focus earthquakes More than 300 km (190 mi) deep shallow-focus earthquakes (blue) Active subduction trenches back arc basins (brown) back arc ridges (yellow) Spreading centers or rifts (green) Other ocean floor features Active faults would be red lines and inactive black but are not shown usually as they tend to be smaller scale features that would add to map complexity. Mouse over shows feature names.

The Tonga–Kermadec subduction zone (also known as Kermadec–Tonga or Tonga–Kermadec-Hikurangi subduction zone) is a convergent plate boundary that stretches from the North Island of New Zealand northward. The formation of the Kermadec and Tonga plates started about 4–5 million years ago. Today, the eastern boundary of the Tonga plate is one of the fastest subduction zones, with a rate up to 24 cm/year (9.4 in/year). The trench formed between the Tonga–Kermadec and Pacific plates is also home to the second deepest trench in the world, at about 10,800 m, as well as the longest chain of submerged volcanoes.

== Geological setting ==
At the northern end of the zone the vector of the Pacific plate collision with the Australian changes to north–south from east–west, to the east of Fiji and south of Samoa. A number of microplates exist between the two major plates and host various back-arc structures of which the largest are the volcanic Tonga–Kermadec Ridge, the actively spreading Lau Basin and the Havre Trough. At the southern end there is a transition to the transform faults of the South Island of New Zealand.

=== Subduction ===
The Tonga–Kermadec subduction zone is a convergent plate boundary that stretches from the southwest of the Kermadec plate (northeast of New Zealand) to the northwest tip of the Tonga plate, with the Pacific plate being subducted under both the Kermadec and Tonga plates. The Kermadec and Tonga plates are micro oceanic plates in the Pacific Ocean, bounded by the Australian and Pacific plates to the west and east respectively. The Kermadec plate begins at the northeastern part of New Zealand and stretches northward to its contact with the Tonga plate where the volcanic hot spot chain of the Louisville Ridge passed historically. The Tonga plate begins 2,500 km (1,600 mi) NNE of New Zealand and stretches northward, until the plate ends bounded by the Niuafoʻou plate to the northwest and the Pacific plate to the northeast.

The Hikurangi Margin is the extension of the Tonga–Kermadec subduction zone further south down the east coast of the North Island.

The subduction process seems to be driven primarily by the excess weight of the cold/old oceanic plate entering the hot mantle of the Earth.

=== Transform faults ===
The southern end of the subduction zone transitions to a right lateral-moving transform fault south of the North Island called the Alpine Fault. This transition involves very active and complex faulting through the south-eastern North Island and Marlborough fault system. Further south the subduction process is reversed in the Fiordland region of the South Island

=== Trenchs ===
The eastern boundaries of the Tonga and Kermadec plates constitute the subduction zone of the Pacific plate, characterized by a trench about 2,000 km (1,200 mi) in length. The trench is continuous, but has different names for different sections: Hikurangi Trough, the Kermadec Trench and the Tonga Trench. The Tonga Trench is the second deepest trench in the world at about 10,800 m, with the deepest point, Horizon Deep, being the deepest point in the Southern Hemisphere and the second deepest point in the world, after the Challenger Deep in the Mariana Trench. The eastern boundary of the Kermadec plate is also the site of the Kermadec Trench, which is the fifth deepest trench in the world at about 10,000 m. The eastern boundary of the Tonga plate is one of the fastest subduction zones with a rate of up to 24 cm/year (9.4 in/year).

== Creation ==
The Tonga and Kermadec plates originated about 4–5 million years ago. Before their creation, the Pacific plate was subducting under the Australian plate, producing the Lau-Colville Ridge (now extinct). About 6 million years ago, this region underwent crustal extension and through a complicated series of spreading centers, ultimately leading to the separation of the Pacific and Australian plate and the creation of what are now Tonga and Kermadec plates. The Tonga and Kermadec plates separated because the northern portion of the original plate was growing much more quickly at 9.6 cm/year (3.8 in/year) than the southern portion at 3.9 cm/year (1.5 in/year), eventually generating a transform fault between them, creating the Tonga and Kermadec plates. Just as this phenomenon created the Tonga and Kermadec plates, it was also the cause of the creation of the Niuafoʻou microplate to the northwest of the Tonga plate because the Tonga's northern portion is still growing much faster than the southern counterpart.

== Volcanism ==
There is extensive and currently active arc volcanism including the volcanoes of Tonga, the Kermadec Islands, the South Kermadec Ridge Seamounts and the Taupō Volcanic Zone.

== "Kermadec Sanctuary" ==
With the largest underwater volcano chain, the region surrounding the Tonga–Kermadec subduction zone is one of the most geologically diverse areas in the world. The Kermadec Sanctuary was proposed in 2015 by the Prime Minister of New Zealand, John Key, at the United Nations in New York, which would create an area off limits to aquaculture, fishing, and mining. The sanctuary would be 620,000 square kilometers, making it the world's largest and most significant fully protected areas. The intention was to have the sanctuary in place, enacted by Parliament in November 2016. In September 2016, the enactment of the Kermadec Sanctuary was delayed due to failed negotiations over the Māori people's rights. As of June 2017, these issues have still not been resolved.

== See also ==
- Tonga–Kermadec Ridge
- Tonga Trench
- Kermadec Trench
- Lau Basin
- Havre Trough
- Hunga Tonga–Hunga Haʻapai
