= Foa (disambiguation) =

Foa may refer to:

== People ==
- Arnoldo Foà (1916–2014), Italian film actor
- Barrett Foa (born 1977), American actor
- Edna Foa (1937–2026), Israeli psychologist
- Emanuele Foà (1892–1949), Italian engineer
- Eugénie Foa (1796–1852), French writer
- Sylvana Foa (born 1977), American foreign correspondent
- Vittorio Foa (1910–2008), Italian politician, trade unionist, journalist and writer

== Places ==
- Foa, an island of Tonga
- La Foa, a commune in the South Province of New Caledonia

== Other uses ==
- Foa (fish), a genus of cardinalfishes
- Argentine Workers' Federation (Spanish: Federación Obrera Argentina), now the Argentine Regional Workers' Federation
- FOA (trade union), Danish trade union
- Farmers' Organization Authority, in Malaysia
- Fields of Aplomb, an American metal band
- Field Operating Agency of the United States Air Force
- Filipinas Orient Airways, a defunct Philippine airline
- First office application
- First-order arithmetic
- Foreign Office Architects, a British architectural firm
- Formula One Administration, part of the Formula One Group
- Friends of Abe, an American support and networking group
- Friends of Animals, an American animal advocacy organization
- Front office appearance
- Foula Airfield, in Scotland
- Funding opportunity announcement
- Swedish National Defence Research Institute (Swedish: Försvarets forskningsanstalt)
