= Giovanni Raboni =

Italian poet

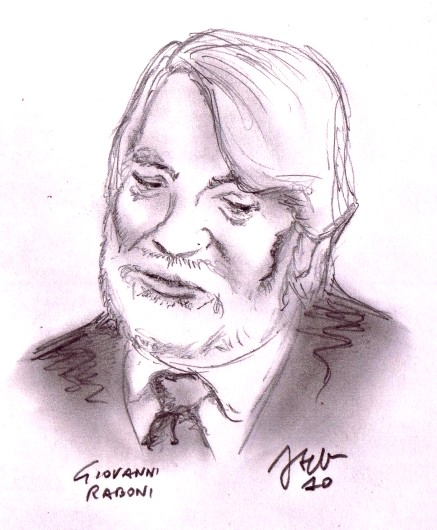
- Portrait of Giovanni Raboni by Paolo Steffan
- Born: 22 January 1932; Milan, Kingdom of Italy
- Died: 16 September 2004 (aged 72); Fontanellato, Italy
- Resting place: Monumental Cemetery of Milan
- Occupations: Poet; translator; literary critic
- Writing career
- Language: Italian
- Years active: 1961–2004
- Notable awards: 1994: Viareggio Prize for poetry; 1988: Aristeion Prize for translation; 1998: Bagutta Prize; 2002: Moravia Prize; 2003: Librex Montale Prize

Giovanni Raboni (22 January 1932 – 16 September 2004) was an Italian poet, translator and literary critic.

== Biography ==
Raboni was born in Milan, Italy, the second son of Giuseppe, a clerk at Milan commune, and Matilde Sommariva. In October 1942, after the first bombings of Milan, the family moved to Sant'Ambrogio Olona, near Varese, where Raboni concluded his primary and intermediate school. His father's love for French and Russian classics made him read and appreciate Proust, Dickens, Dostoevskij and when his cousin Giandomenico Guarino, knowledgeable about contemporary literature and poetry, found shelter in Sant'Ambrogio too after 8 September 1943 armistice, Raboni met the works by Piovene, Buzzati, Ungaretti, Quasimodo, Cardarelli, and Montale about whom he said: "I know I owe much to Montale, I realise this upon rereading him, even if I did not love him as much as Eliot and Sereni, but he affected me a lot... especially his expression of the limits, of the fact that we cannot demand too much in 20th century of poetry as a source of truth."

Having completed law studies, he was a lawyer for some years, but at the end of the 1950s, he felt more attracted to literature and poetry. He met in Milan Vittorio Sereni, Antonio Porta, Giovanni Testori, Giorgio Strehler and began working for periodicals and newspapers, at first in the editorial staff of Aut Aut, a magazine edited by Enzo Paci, then writing for Piergiorgio Bellocchio's Quaderni piacentini and Roberto Longhi's Paragone and finally for Corriere della Sera for which worked several years.

Raboni became was appreciated as both a literary critic and a translator of classic works: he translated in Italian some works by Gustave Flaubert, and by Guillaume Apollinaire, Les Fleurs du mal by Charles Baudelaire for Einaudi publishing house, Jean Racine and Proust's In Search of Lost Time in Mondadori's "I Meridiani" collection.

In 1961 he published two short poetry collections, Il catalogo è questo and L'insalubrità dell'aria, followed by Le case della Vetra in 1966, Cadenza d'inganno in 1975, Nel grave sogno in 1982 and, in 1988, the anthology A tanto caro sangue. In the 1970s he began editing the poetry series "I quaderni della Fenice" for Guanda publishing house, acting as a kind of talent scout for new poets. Milan (especially the memory of the old city, before the recent town plannings) is at the heart of his matters:

...e sì, il Naviglio è a due passi, la nebbia era più forte
prima che lo coprissero, la piazza
piena di bancarelle con le luci
a acetilene, le padelle nere
delle castagne arrosto, i mangiatori
di chiodi e di stoviglie
non era certo un posto da passarci
insieme a una ragazza.
Ma così come hanno fatto, abbattere case,
distruggere quartieri, qui e altrove
(la Vetra, Fiori Chiari, il Bottonuto),
a cosa serve?[...]

— Giovanni Raboni,
from Le case della Vetra, Mondadori, Milan, 1996
Translation:

...Yes, Naviglio is near, and was more mist-shrouded
before its shingle, and the square
full of acetylene-lighted stalls, black pans
for roast chestnuts, and nail
and crockery swallowers
it wasn’t good to come there
with your girlfriend.
But so as they have done,
to destroy buildings,
to destroy quarters, here and elsewhere
(Vetra, Fiori Chiari, Bottonuto)
what’s the reason?[...]

In June 1971 he was one of the 800 intellectuals who signed, in L'Espresso magazine, a manifesto against Luigi Calabresi, a police officer falsely suspected of having killed the anarchist Giuseppe Pinelli. In October he was among those who signed a "self-denunciation", to express solidarity with some journalists of Lotta Continua newspaper, defending their strong anti-government positions.

Among his literary critic essays are Poesia degli anni sessanta (Poetry of the 1960s) published in 1968, Quaderno in prosa in 1981. La fossa di Cherubino (1980) collects his proses.

Raboni was interested in theater too: was in the directorial committee of Piccolo Teatro di Milano and wrote several plays, such as Alcesti o la recita dell'esilio and Rappresentazione della croce (2000). His activity as a poet went on with Canzonette mortali (1987), Versi guerrieri e amorosi (1990), Ogni terzo pensiero (1993, with which he won the Viareggio Prize for poetry), Quare tristis (1998), and Barlumi di Storia (2002).

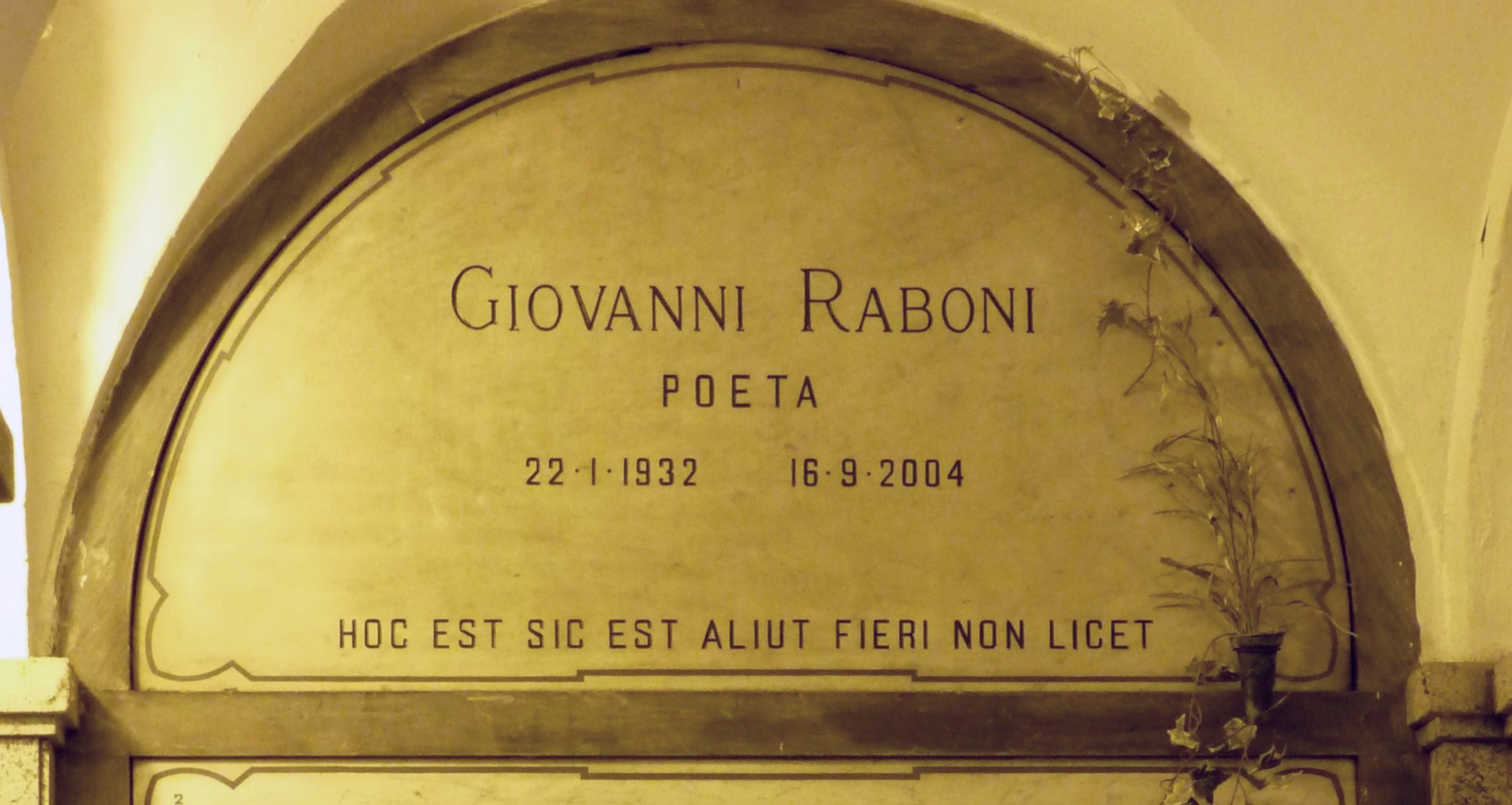
Raboni's grave at the Monumental Cemetery of Milan

Giovanni Raboni died of a heart attack in Fontanellato in 2004. He is buried at the Monumental Cemetery of Milan.

His wife, poet Patrizia Valduga, wrote the afterword to his last poetry collection Ultimi versi, published posthumously in 2006; one of his last poems is "Canzone del danno e della beffa" ("Song of the harm and the hoax"), also published posthumously on Corriere della Sera in 2004.

Andrea Cortellessa, in an article of Manifesto in the days after his death, remembers the poet's "obsessive mournful compulsion on his last poetic verses", with these significant lines from Quare tristis: "Who dreams himself / alive with his own dead / maybe he doesn't live also there /in his dream,/ and you must let him lie – not still /wake up, not until // out, in the light, remains that squeaky / burden, that blinding plate…".

== Bibliography ==
Poetry

- Il catalogo è questo: quindici poesie, Lampugnani Nigri, con nota di Carlo Bertocchi, Milan, 1961
- L'insalubrità dell'aria, All'insegna del pesce d'oro, Vanni Scheiwiller, Milan, 1963
- Le case della Vetra, Mondadori, Milan, 1966
- Gesta romanorum: 20 poesie, Lampugnani Nigri, Milan, 1967
- Economia della paura, All'insegna del pesce d'oro, Vanni Scheiwiller, Milan, 1971
- Cadenza d'inganno, Mondadori, Milan, 1975
- Il più freddo anno di grazia, San Marco dei Giustiniani, Genoa, 1978
- Nel grave sogno, Mondadori, Milan, 1982
- Raboni, Manzoni, Il ventaglio, Milan, 1985
- Canzonette mortali, Crocetti, Milan, 1987
- A tanto caro sangue: Poesie 1953-1987, Mondadori, Milan, 1988
- Transeuropa, Mondadori, Milan, 1988
- Versi guerrieri e amorosi, Einaudi, Turin, 1990
- Un gatto più un gatto, with illustrations by Nicoletta Costa, Mondadori, Milan, 1991
- Ogni terzo pensiero, Mondadori, Milan, 1993
- Devozioni perverse, Rizzoli, Milan, 1994
- Nel libro della mente, with seven etchings by Attilio Steffanoni, All'insegna del pesce d'oro, Vanni Scheiwiller, Milan, 1997
- Quare tristis, Mondadori, Milan, 1998
- Rappresentazione della croce, Garzanti, Milan, 1997, 2000^{2}
- Tutte le poesie (1951–1998), Garzanti, Milan, 2000
- Alcesti o la recita dell'esilio, Garzanti, Milan, 2002
- Barlumi di storia, Mondadori, Milan, 2002
- Ultimi versi, afterword by Patrizia Valduga, posthumous, Garzanti, Milan, 2006

Essays

- Poesia degli anni sessanta, Editori Riuniti, Rome, 1976
- Poesia italiana contemporanea, Sansoni, Florence, 1980
- Quaderno in prosa, Lampugnani Nigri, Milano, 1981
- Baj. Idraulica, with Gillo Dorfles, Skira, Edizioni d'arte, Milan, 2003
- La poesia che si fa. Critica e storia del Novecento poetico italiano 1959-2004, Garzanti, Milan, 2005

Prose

- La fossa di Cherubino, Guanda, Milan, 1980
