= Futa Helu =

Tongan philosopher (1934–2010)

ʻIlaisa Futa-ʻi-Haʻangana Helu
- Born: 17 June 1934; Lotofoa, Foa, Tonga
- Died: 2 February 2010 (aged 75)
- Children: 6

Philosophical work
- Era: 20th-century philosophy
- Region: Western philosophy
- Main interests: Political philosophy, ethics

Futa Helu (17 June 1934 – 2 February 2010) was a Tongan philosopher, historian, and educator. He studied philosophy under the Australian empiricist John Anderson and in 1963 launched an educational institute named ʻAtenisi (Tongan for Athens, to pay homage to the ancient Greek philosophers, Herakleitos in particular). The institute began as a continuing education programme for civil servants, then initiated a high school in 1964 and a university in 1975.

== Life ==
Helu was born 17 June 1934 in the village of Lotofoa on the island of Foa in the Haʻapai archipelago in the (Polynesian) Kingdom of Tonga. Helu, in fact, is a minor chiefly title, carrying the task of managing both the people and land of the village. In Haʻapai, Futa was a bright, although headstrong, student. In 1947 he was selected to be part of the founding class of the newly established Tonga high school sited in Tonga's capital, the school being a project of a promising Crown Prince who would accede to the throne as Tāufaʻāhau Tupou IV in 1967.

Helu studied in Australia at Newington College (1953–1956) and the University of Sydney (1957–60). At Sydney he focused on philosophy, English literature, mathematics and physics. Back in Tonga in April 1961 he did not become – as one might have expected – a government bureaucrat, but held himself out as tutor to those having trouble keeping up at school. His way of teaching soon became famous, and many Tongans who are now important figures claim he instilled a love of learning that impelled their careers.

ʻAtenisi Institute was initially a downtown night school providing continuing education for civil servants, evolving into a daytime secondary school in 1964. In 1966 Helu registered ʻAtenisi's high school with the government and at the end of that year leased a 6.5-hectare (16-acre) parcel in Tufuenga, a western district in the Tongan capital of Nukuʻalofa. The parcel is, in fact, below sea level and students often speak of the swampus instead of the campus. At the end of 1975 a small university joined the high school on the site, its first Bachelor of Arts degrees being awarded in 1980, followed a few years later by Bachelor of Science degrees. By the 1990s, some Master of Arts degrees – and even a PhD degree – were awarded in collaboration with universities in Australia and New Zealand.

Dr. Helu not only administered his institute but – like Thomas Jefferson at the University of Virginia in early 19th century America – designed its classrooms, laboratories, and libraries, often in classical style. Whilst small contractors were, of course, employed in ʻAtenisi's construction, in the early days its director was not above roofing a new building after class.

In 1992 Dr. Helu joined Tonga's Catholic bishop, Patelisio P. Fīnau, and the former president of the Free Wesleyan Church, Dr. Sione ʻAmanaki Havea, in sponsoring a conference advocating Tonga's transition from a feudal to parliamentary monarchy. Not only did the Government resist this call but it punished ʻAtenisi for its advocacy by thenceforth refusing to employ its university graduates, a severe penalty in the developing world. The boycott was lifted after the accession of a commoner prime minister in 2006 and the Government's concession to democratic principle.

Until her death in April 2008, Dr. Helu was married to Kaloni Schaaf; the union produced six children and numerous grandchildren. Two daughters have distinguished themselves in the performing arts – Sisiʻuno Helu, founder of ʻAtenisi's performing arts troupe and orchestra, has staged Tongan faiva and spirited excerpts from Italian opera on tours of the Pacific, Europe, and the US; ʻAtolomake Helu has sung mezzo-soprano in noted international venues, such as Sydney and Auckland Town Halls. A son, Niulala Helu, is a former lecturer in Tongan culture at the University of Auckland.

Dr. Helu was the author of several books, most importantly two books on Tongan culture, a monograph on Herakleitos, and a collection of essays regarding South Pacific culture. In 1999 the University of the South Pacific awarded him an honorary doctorate in literature. The scholar retired as institute director and dean of its university in 2007, replaced in the former post by his daughter Sisiʻuno (in 2008 and from 2010 to 2019) and son Niulala (in 2009) ... and in the latter (from 2008 to 2010 and from 2015 to 2025) by Dr. Michael Horowitz, a US sociologist who served as associate dean in the late '90s. Dr. ʻOpeti Taliai – a Tongan anthropologist who holds a PhD from Massey University as well as an ʻAtenisi undergraduate degree – was university dean from 2013 through 2014.

In retirement, Helu remained an authority on Tongan history, tradition, and education, and although not a politician himself, remained an influential voice in Tongan politics due to the vindication of his advocacy of democracy. At ʻAtenisi, he retained the title of professor emeritus of Philosophy and Tongan Culture.

The last years of his life were marred by declining physical and mental health, the latter due to Alzheimer's disease.

=== Documentary film ===
In August 2012, a documentary on Futa Helu's life and the history of ʻAtenisi was screened at the New Zealand International Film Festival, garnering favourable reviews in the New Zealand Herald and Overland magazine. The film, Tongan Ark, was written, filmed and directed by Paul Janman, an NZ anthropologist and former ʻAtenisi instructor, who went on to earn a PhD in Communications and teach screen production at the Auckland University of Technology [AUT].

== Bibliography ==
- ʻI.F. Helu; Thinking in Tongan society; 1982
- ʻI.F. Helu; Fakahola talanoa: Ko e ngaahi lea ohi; 1985
- ʻI.F. Helu; Herakleitos of Ephesos; 1995
- ʻI.F. Helu; Critical essays: Cultural perspectives from the Southseas; 1999
- I. Campbell & E. Coxon (eds); Polynesian paradox: Essays to honour his 70th birthday; 2005
