= Dario Graffi =

Italian mathematical physicist

- Born: 10 January 1905; Rovigo, Italy
- Died: 28 December 1990 (aged 85); Bologna, Italy
- Awards: Golden medal "Benemeriti della Scuola, della Cultura, dell'Arte" (1964); Prize of the President of the Italian Republic (1965)
- Scientific career
- Fields: Continuum mechanics; Theory of electromagnetism; Fluid dynamics; Oscillation theory
- Academic advisors: Pietro Burgatti; Quirino Majorana; Emanuele Foà
- Notable students: Lamberto Cesari

Dario Graffi (10 January 1905 – 28 December 1990) was an Italian mathematical physicist, known for his researches on the electromagnetic field, particularly for a mathematical explanation of the Luxemburg effect, for proving an important uniqueness theorem for the solutions of a class of fluid dynamics equations including the Navier-Stokes equation, for his researches in continuum mechanics and for his contribution to oscillation theory.

== Life and academic career ==
Dario Graffi was born in Rovigo, the son of Michele, a yarn wholesale trader and of Amalia Tedeschi. He attended the Istituto tecnico in his home town, specializing in physics and mathematics, but got his diploma in Bologna in 1921, where his family had moved a year before.

He graduated from the University of Bologna in Physics in 1925, when he was 20, and in mathematics in 1927, when he was 22: both the degrees were awarded cum laude,

=== Honors ===
He was awarded the Golden medal "Benemeriti della Scuola, della Cultura, dell'Arte" in 1964, and a year later, the Accademia Nazionale dei Lincei awarded him the Prize of the President of the Italian Republic.

== Work ==
=== Research activity ===
Graffi is known for his researches on the electromagnetic field, particularly for a mathematical explanation of the Luxemburg effect, for proving an important uniqueness theorem for the solutions of a class of fluid dynamics equations including the Navier-Stokes equation, for his researches in continuum mechanics and for his contribution to oscillation theory.

== Selected publications ==
Graffi published 181 works. lists of his publications are included in references (Cercignani 1992, pp. 108–114) and in the biographical section of his "Selected works" (1999, pp. XX–XXVI): however, the set of lecture notes (Graffi 1981) is not listed in any of his publication lists.

=== Scientific works ===
==== Scientific papers ====
- Graffi, Dario (1936), "Una teoria ereditaria dell'effetto Lussemburgo" [An hereditary theory of the Luxemburg effect], Rendiconti del Seminario Matematico della Università di Padova (in Italian), 7: 36–54, JFM 62.0546.02, Zbl 0015.13705. In this paper, written only few years after the discovery of the effect itself, Dario Graffi proposes a theory of the Luxemburg effect based on Volterra's theory of hereditary phenomena.
- Graffi, Dario (1949) [14 April 1942], "Sul modello del Rocard per le oscillazioni di rilassamento" [On Rocard's model for relaxation oscillations], Atti della Accademia delle Scienze di Ferrara (in Italian), 21–22 – Anni Accademici (1938–1943): 255–257
- Graffi, Dario (1953), "Il Teorema di Unicita nella Dinamica dei Fluidi Compressibili" [The uniqueness theorem in the dynamics of compressible fluids], Journal of Rational Mechanics and Analysis (in Italian), 2 (1): 99–106, doi:10.1512/iumj.1953.2.52004, ISSN 0022-2518, MR 0052270, Zbl 0050.19604. In this paper, Graffi extends to compressible viscous fluids a uniqueness theorem for the solutions to Navier-Stokes equation in bounded domains, previously proved only for incompressible fluids by Emanuele Foà and rediscovered by David Dolidze.
- Graffi, Dario (1955), "Il teorema di unicità per i fluidi incompressibili, perfetti, eterogenei" [The uniqueness theorem for incompressible, perfect, heterogeneous fluids] (PDF), Revista de la Unión Matemática Argentina y de la Asociación Física Argentina (in Italian), XVII: 73–77, ISSN 0041-6932, MR 0082829, Zbl 0074.20206.
- Graffi, Dario (2 November 1959), "Sur un théorème d'unicité pour le mouvement d'un fluide visqueux dans un domaine illimité" [On a uniqueness theorem for the motion of a viscous fluid on an unbounded domain], Comptes rendus hebdomadaires des séances de l'Académie des sciences (in French), 249 (2): 1741–1743, MR 0109550, Zbl 0088.41201, available at Gallica. A short research note announcing the results of the author on the uniqueness of solutions of the Navier-Stokes equations on unbounded domains under the hypothesis of constant fluid velocity at infinity.
- Graffi, Dario (1960), "Sul teorema di unicità nella dinamica dei fluidi" [On the uniqueness theorem in fluid mechanics], Annali di Matematica Pura ed Applicata, IV Serie (in Italian), 50: 379–387, doi:10.1007/BF02414524, ISSN 0373-3114, MR 0122198, S2CID 122474925, Zbl 0102.41103 (online version ISSN 1618-1891). In this paper, Graffi extends his uniqueness theorem for the solutions of Navier-Stokes equations on unbounded domains relaxing previously assumed hypotheses on the behaviour of the velocity at infinity.
- Graffi, Dario (1962), "Sui teoremi di unicita nella dinamica dei fluidi" [On uniqueness theorems in fluid dynamics], Rendiconti del Seminario Matematico e Fisico di Milano (in Italian), 32 (1): 80–91, doi:10.1007/BF02925666, MR 0148304, S2CID 117119086, Zbl 0128.43503. The published text of a conference held at the Seminario Matematico e Fisico di Milano, exposing mainly his researches on the uniqueness of the solutions to the Navier-Stokes equations.
- Graffi, Dario (December 1974), "Sull'espressione dell'energia libera nei materiali viscoelastici lineari" [On the formula of free energy in linear viscoelastic materials], Annali di Matematica Pura ed Applicata, IV Serie (in Italian), 98: 273–279, doi:10.1007/BF02414027, ISSN 0373-3114, MR 0345497, S2CID 120967727, Zbl 0281.73027 (online version ISSN 1618-1891). In this paper, Graffi introduces the free energy now called Graffi–Volterra free energy after him.
- Graffi, Dario; Fabrizio, Mauro (1989), "Sulla nozione di stato per materiali viscoelastici di tipo "rate"" [On the notion of state for "rate" type viscoelastic materials], Atti della Accademia Nazionale dei Lincei. Rendiconti. Classe di Scienze Fisiche, Matematiche e Naturali, Serie VIII (in Italian), 83 (1): 201–208, MR 1142459, Zbl 0732.73023.
- Graffi, Dario; Fabrizio, Mauro (1989), "Non unicità dell'energia libera per materiali viscoelastici" [Non uniqueness of free energy for viscoelastic materials], Atti della Accademia Nazionale dei Lincei. Rendiconti. Classe di Scienze Fisiche, Matematiche e Naturali, Serie VIII (in Italian), 83 (1): 209–214, MR 1142460, Zbl 0732.73024.

==== Books ====
- Graffi, Dario (1980), Nonlinear partial differential equations in physical problems, Research Notes in Mathematics, vol. 42, Boston–London–Melbourne: Pitman Advanced Publishing Program, pp. IV+105, ISBN 978-0-273-08474-7, ISSN 0269-3674, MR 0580946, Zbl 0453.35001, reviewed by Ablowitz, Mark J. (1984), "Nonlinear Partial Differential Equations in Physical Problems. by D. Graffi", SIAM Review, 26 (1): 125, doi:10.1137/1026014, ISSN 0036-1445, JSTOR 2029690, by Konhauser, Joseph (April 1982), "Telegraphic Reviews. Differential Equations, P*. Nonlinear Partial Differential Equations in Physical Problems. D. Graffi", The American Mathematical Monthly, 89 (4): C25–C36, ISSN 0002-9890, JSTOR 2320227 (also available with online ISSN 1930-0972), and by Marseglia, E. (1981), "Book reviews. Nonlinear Partial Differential Equations in Physical Problems. By D. Graffi", Philosophical Magazine B, 49 (1): 184, Bibcode:1981PMagB..43..183., doi:10.1080/01418638108225813, ISSN 1364-2812 (also available with online ISSN 1463-6417).
- Graffi, Dario (1981), Questioni sull'elettromagnetismo [Issues on electromagnetism] (in Italian), Naples: Liguori editore, p. 247, ISBN 978-88-207-1136-8. A set of lecture notes of a course held by Graffi in the years 1977–1978.
- Graffi, Dario (November 1999), Fabrizio, M.; Grioli, G.; Renno, P. (eds.), Opere scelte [Selected works] (in Italian, English, and French), Bologna: C.N.R. – Gruppo Nazionale per la Fisica Matematica, pp. XXXII+458. Dario Graffi's "Selected works", containing a choice of his research papers reprinted in their original typographical form.

=== Historical, commemorative and survey works ===
- Graffi, Dario (1949–1950), "Emanuele Foà", Rendiconto delle Sessioni dell'Accademia delle Scienze dell'Istituto di Bologna, Classe di Scienze Fisiche, nuova serie (in Italian), LIV: 46–54. An obituary, with a list of his publications.
- Graffi, Dario (1975), "L'Elettromagnetismo in Levi-Civita", in Segre, Beniamino; Cattaneo, Carlo; Bompiani, Enrico; Colombo, Giuseppe; Finzi, Bruno; Graffi, Dario; Radicati di Brozolo, Luigi; Tricomi, Francesco Giacomo (eds.), Tullio Levi-Civita. Convegno internazionale celebrativo del centenario della nascita (Roma, 17–19 dicembre 1973) [Tullio Levi-Civita. International congress for the celebration of the centenary of his birth (Rome, 17–19 December 1973)], Atti dei Convegni Lincei (in Italian), vol. 8, Rome: Accademia Nazionale dei Lincei, pp. 171–177, ISSN 0391-805X. "Electromagnetism in the work of Levi-Civita" (English translation of the contribution title) is a survey of some of the works of Levi-Civita on the theory of electromagnetism.
- Graffi, Dario (1982), "Un grande accademico di Modena: Agostino Cauchy" [A great academician of Modena: Augustin Cauchy], Accademia Nazionale di Scienze Lettere e Arti di Modena. Atti, C. S., Serie VI (in Italian), XXIV: 345–355. The published text of the prolusion to the opening of the 1976 academic year, commemorating Augustin Louis Cauchy and describing his relationships with the Accademia Nazionale di Scienze Lettere e Arti di Modena, the first one in Italy having elected him member.
- Graffi, Dario (1992), "L'opera di Vito Volterra sui fenomeni ereditari e alcune sue conseguenze", in Amaldi, E.; Amerio, L.; Fichera, G.; Gregory, T.; Grioli, G.; Martinelli, E.; Montalenti, G.; Pignedoli, A.; Salvini, Giorgio; Scorza Dragoni, Giuseppe (eds.), Convegno internazionale in memoria di Vito Volterra (8–11 ottobre 1990) [International congress in memory of Vito Volterra (8–11 October 1990)], Atti dei Convegni Lincei (in Italian), vol. 92, Roma: Accademia Nazionale dei Lincei, pp. 39–76, ISSN 0391-805X, MR 1783028, Zbl 0977.01022, archived from the original on 2017-01-07. "The work of Vito Volterra on hereditary phenomena and some of their consequences" is an ample technical survey paper on the research work of Vito Volterra on hereditary phenomena in mathematical physics.

== See also ==
- Gaetano Fichera
- Heat equation
- Ordinary differential equation
- Wave propagation
