= Goffredo Fofi =

Italian journalist and film critic (1937–2025)

- Born: 15 April 1937 Gubbio, Italy
- Died: 11 July 2025 (aged 88) Rome, Italy

Goffredo Fofi (15 April 1937 – 11 July 2025) was an Italian essayist, activist, journalist and film, literary and theatre critic.

== Life and career ==
Fofi was born on 15 April 1937 in Gubbio. In 1955 he relocated to Palermo, being drawn to the city by the work of Danilo Dolci.

In the first half of the 1960s he moved to Paris and worked in the film magazine Positif. Back in Italy, he founded the Quaderni piacentini together with Piergiorgio Bellocchio and Grazia Cherchi and wrote his journalistic investigation L'immigrazione meridionale a Torino, rejected by the Turin publisher Einaudi for considerations on the policy of the company Fiat towards immigration, it was instead published by Feltrinelli. In 1967 he founded Ombre rosse in Turin, a film magazine with strongly political content and very close to the student and workers' movements.

Fofi purchased the rights to the novel Emmanuelle for the publishing house and edited the Italian translation: the first edition was seized by the judiciary for obscenity, but the novel still became a bestseller thanks to the subsequent film adaptation of the same name.

In 1997 he founded the literary magazine Lo Straniero, which finished publication at the end of 2016.

Fofi died in Rome on 11 July 2025, at the age of 88.
