= William Berg =

William Berg may refer to:

- William Berg (classicist) (1938–2021), American classicist
- William Berg (footballer), played for Royn Hvalba
- William H. Berg House

== See also ==
- Bill Berg (disambiguation)
- William of Berg (disambiguation)
- William Burgh (disambiguation)
