= Quaderni piacentini =

Political and cultural magazine in Italy (1962–1984)

- Categories: Political magazine; Cultural magazine
- Frequency: Bimonthly
- Founded: 1962
- Final issue: 1984
- Country: Italy
- Based in: Piacenza
- Language: Italian

Quaderni piacentini (Italian: Piacenza Notebooks) was a leftist political and cultural magazine which was published in Piacenza, Italy, between 1962 and 1984 with some interruptions. The magazine was one of the theoretical-political media outlets of the New Left and was one of the early publications with a pro-Chinese stance in Italy.

== History and profile ==
Quaderni piacentini was founded by Piergiorgio Bellocchio and Grazia Cherchi in Piacenza in 1962. It followed the tradition of Il Politecnico, a Milan-based Communist cultural and literary magazine published between 1945 and 1947.

Quaderni piacentini was published bimonthly until 1980 and ceased publication in 1984. The magazine was directed by Piergiorgio Bellocchio. From 1971 it was directed by a management committee. The magazine covered articles on the student movement of 1968 and on criticism of capitalist society. After 1965 it began to feature discussions about the American civil rights movement, the Vietnam War and the Chinese Cultural Revolution.

The contributors of Quaderni piacentini were critical of the Italian Communist Party (PCI) and other leading communist groups of the period in Italy. The reason for this opposition against the PCI was the party's nonrevolutionary policy. Although the Quaderni piacentini writers did not have a homogenous ideology, they were all adherents of the anti-moderate, anti-reformism and libertarianism. They also had a pro-Chinese stance. Notable contributors of Quaderni piacentini included Franco Fortini, Goffredo Fofi, Giovanni Giudici and Alberto Asor Rosa. The magazine was read mostly by leftist university students. In 1968 and 1970 it managed to sell 13,000 copies.

There are some books about Quaderni piacentini, one of which was published by Giacomo Pontremoli in 2017.
