= Bill Berg =

Bill Berg may refer to:

- William Berg (classicist) (1938–2021), American classicist
- Bill Berg (ice hockey) (born 1967), Canadian ice hockey player
- Bill Berg (musician), American drummer in jazz and fusion music
- Bill Berg (politician) (1939–1967), Royal Canadian Mounted police man, game outfitter and politician

== See also ==
- William Berg (disambiguation)
