= Sisiʻuno Helu =

Tongan academic and film producer

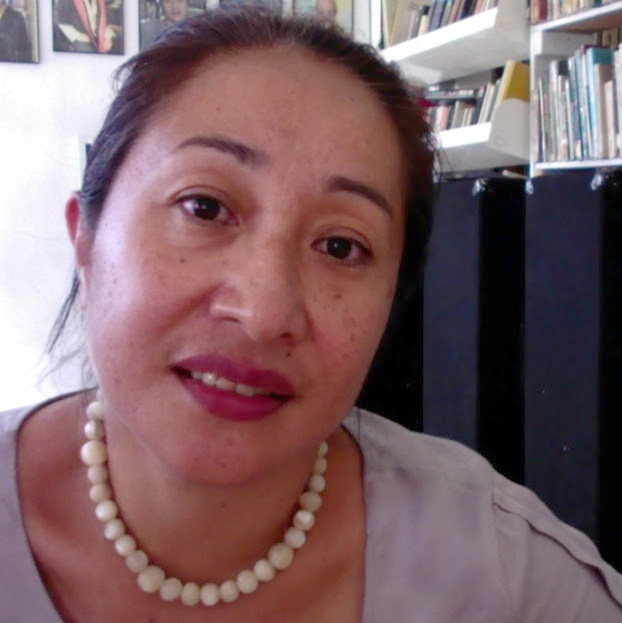
Sisiʻuno Helu

Sisi’uno Helu (born 1972) is a Tongan academic, film producer, and performing artist. She has become the leading impresario of European opera within Polynesia. She is the daughter of Tongan philosopher and historian Futa Helu, the founder of the ʻAtenisi Institute.

== Life ==
Helu holds a diploma in instrumental music from the University of Queensland's School of Music, awarded in 1993.

In her early 20s, she pioneered the performing arts division of ʻAtenisi Institute in Tonga, offering instruction in European opera as well as traditional Tongan faiva. Between 1996 and 2006, the division's troupe toured North America, Europe, the Pacific Islands, and Australasia. In 2007 she returned to Tonga to succeed her father as institute president.

In 2011 Helu launched a satellite performance centre in suburban Sydney, the Futa Helu Performing Arts and Culture Centre. Like its Tongan parent, the academy teaches European opera as well as traditional Tongan faiva. Helu also teaches instrumental music, music theory, and Polynesian dance to school students on Tongatapu.

Along with University Dean Dr Michael Horowitz and her sister ‘Atolomake (a senior lecturer in music), Helu starred in an hour-long documentary about ‘Atenisi, Tongan Ark. In 2015 she founded the Nuku’alofa Film Festival to encourage Tongan cinema. In 2018 she produced Leitis in Waiting, a documentary film about transgender rights in Tonga.
