= William Burke =

William or Willie Burke may refer to:

== Law and politics ==
- William J. Burke (1862–1925), American politician and businessman
- William H. Burke Jr. (1906–1975), American political figure
- W. Lewis Burke (born 1948; born William Lewis Burke) American lawyer and law professor
- William Burke-White, American law professor and policy advisor

== Sports ==
- William Burke (baseball) (1865–1939), American baseball player
- William H. Burke (fl. 1899–1906), American football coach
- Willie Burke (born 1972), Irish footballer

== Others ==
- William mac Ulick Burke, 4th Clanricarde or Mac William Uachtar (d. 1430), Irish chieftain and noble
- William Burke, Lord of Bealatury (fl. 1580s-1616), Irish noble and soldier
- William Burke (prior) (c. 1611–c. 1685), Irish Dominican cleric
- William Burke, 7th Earl of Clanricarde (died 1687), Irish peer
- William Burke (pirate) (died 1699), Irish pirate
- William Burke (author) (1729–1798), English pamphleteer
- William Burke (Burke and Hare murders) (1792–1829), Irish-Scots serial killer
- William Malachy Burke (1819–1879), Irish physician and Registrar General
- William Burke Miller (1904–1983), American newspaper and radio reporter
- William L. Burke (1941–1996), American astronomy, astrophysics, and physics professor

== See also ==
- Billy Burke (disambiguation)
- William de Burgh (disambiguation), once used interchangeably with Burke
- William Burgh (disambiguation), once used interchangeably with Burke
