= William of Berg =

William of Berg may refer to:

- William I of Berg (c. 1242–1308), son of Count Adolf VII of Berg and Margaret of Hochstaden
- William IV, Duke of Jülich-Berg (1455–1511), last ruler of the Duchy of Jülich-Berg
- William, Duke of Jülich-Cleves-Berg (1516–1592)
- William VII of Jülich, 1st Duke of Berg (1348–1408), son of Gerhard VI of Jülich, Count of Berg
- William IV of Berg-s'Heerenberg (1537–1586), Stadtholder of Guelders and Zutphen

== See also ==
- William Berg (disambiguation)
