= Faleloa =

Coordinates: 19.734°S 174.288°W

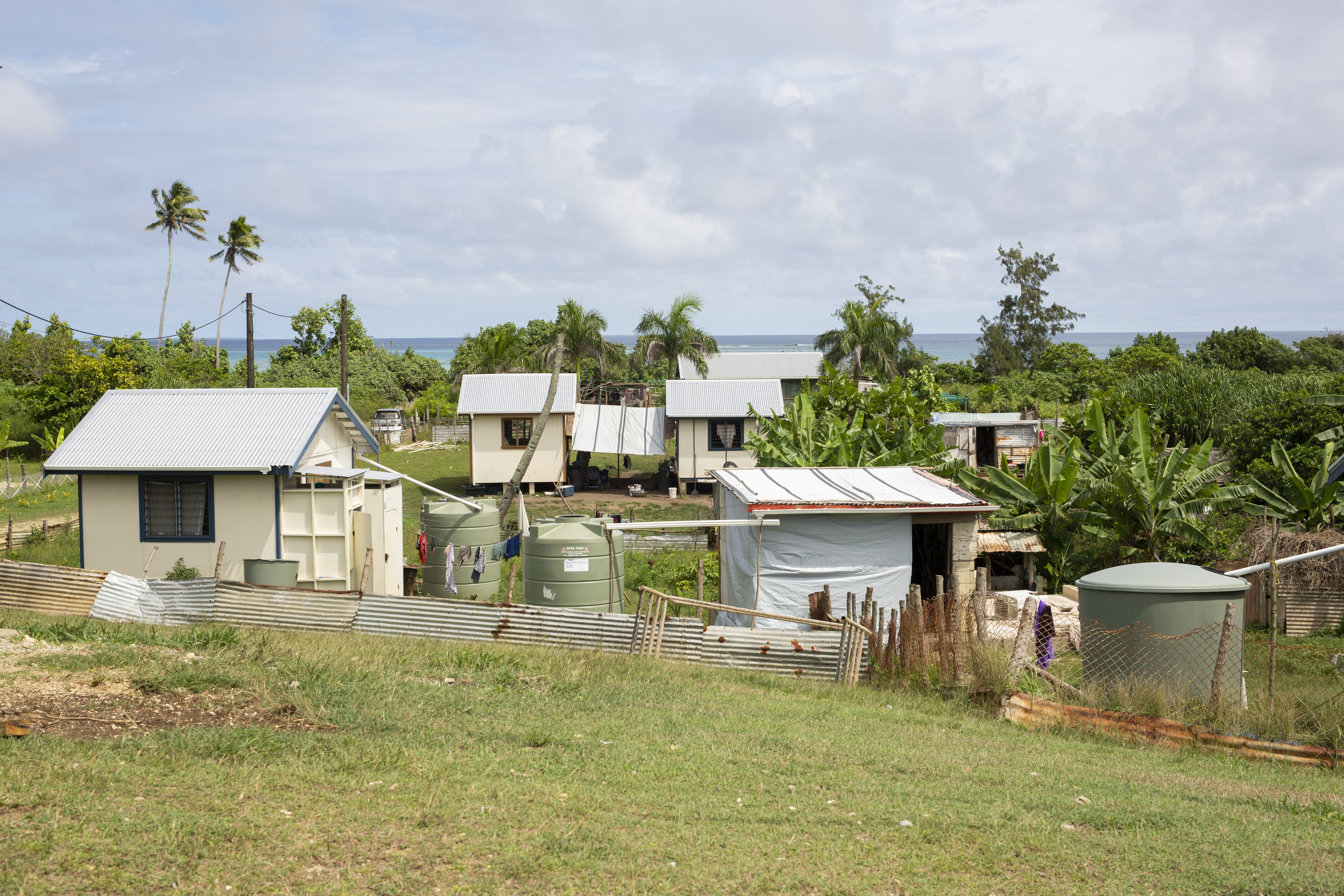
Faleloa, Foa Island, Haʻapai Islands, Tonga

Faleloa is a settlement in Foa island, Tonga. It had a population of 380 in 2016.
