= John Oge Burke =

Irish gentleman and soldier, executed in 1601

- Sean Óge de Búrca
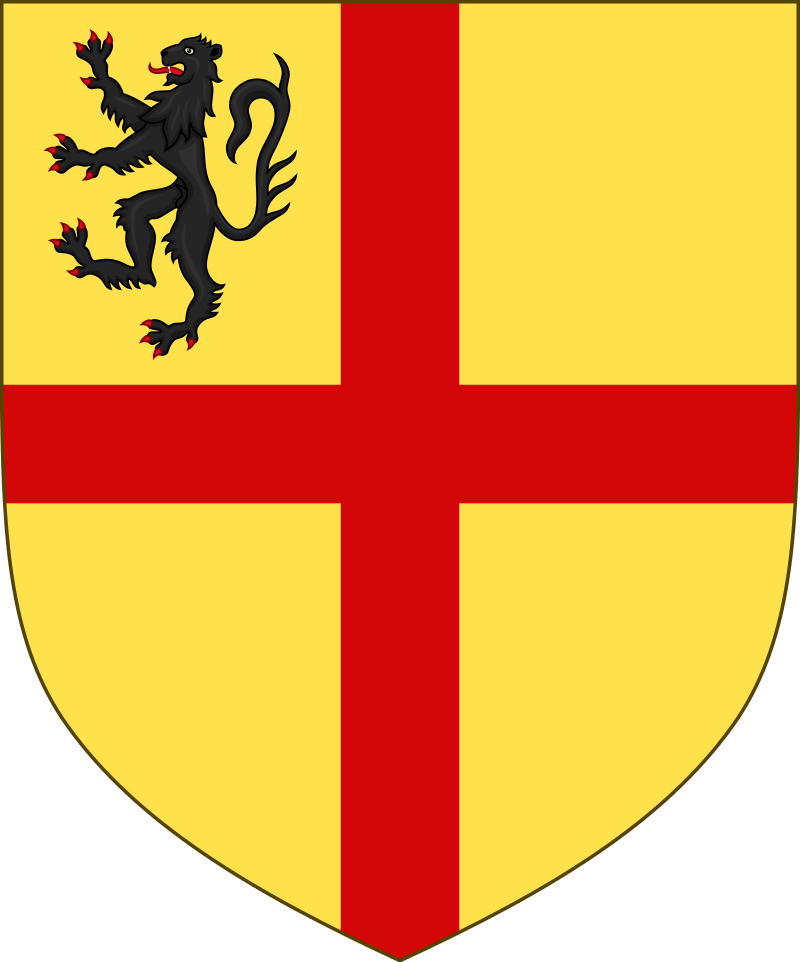
- Arms of de Burgh/Burke of Clanricarde: Or, a cross gules in the first quarter a lion rampant sable
- Died: June 1601
- Parent: John Burke
- Relatives: Redmond Burke (brother); William Burke (brother); Thomas Burke (brother)
- Military career
- Service years: 1593–1601
- Conflicts: Nine Years' War

John Oge Burke (Irish: Sean Óge de Búrca; d. June 1601) was an Irish gentleman and soldier, who served during the Nine Years' War, and was executed.

== Career ==
Burke was one of the sons of John Burke, Baron Leitrim (died 1583). He was a participant in the Nine Years' War (Ireland), fighting alongside his brother William Burke, Lord of Bealatury. However he was captured in the first week of 1601.

The Annals of the Four Masters, sub anno 1601, outline John Oge's fate:

After the sons of John Burke had gone to O'Donnell, as we have already stated, they continued, whithersoever they went, in company with O'Donnell, to harass and plunder the Queen's people; for which reason the Lord Justice of Ireland ordered the Earl of Ormond to put to death their brother, John Oge Burke, whom we have mentioned as having been taken prisoner in the first week of this year, in O'Meagher's country of Ikerrin, by some of the gentlemen of the Butlers. This was accordingly done in the month of June.

== See also ==
- House of Burgh, an Anglo-Norman and Hiberno-Norman dynasty founded in 1193
- Earl of Clanricarde
- Clanricarde
