= Billy Burke =

Bill or Billy Burke may refer to:

== Sports ==
- Billy Burke (baseball) (1889–1967), American baseball player
- Billy Burke (golfer) (1902–1972), American golfer
- Billy Burke (hurler) (1912–1995), Irish hurler
- Bill Burke (athlete) (born 1969), American middle-distance runner

== Others ==
- Billy Burke (criminal) (1858–1919), American gangster
- Bill Burke (photographer) (born 1943), American documentary photographer
- Billy Burke (firefighter) (1955–2001), American fire captain
- Billy Burke (actor) (born 1966), American actor

== See also ==
- Billie Burke (1884–1970), American stage and screen actress
- William Burke (disambiguation)
