= John Burke, Baron Leitrim =

Irish noble (died 1583)

John "na Seamar" Burke Baron Leitrim
- Seán mac an Iarla a Búrc
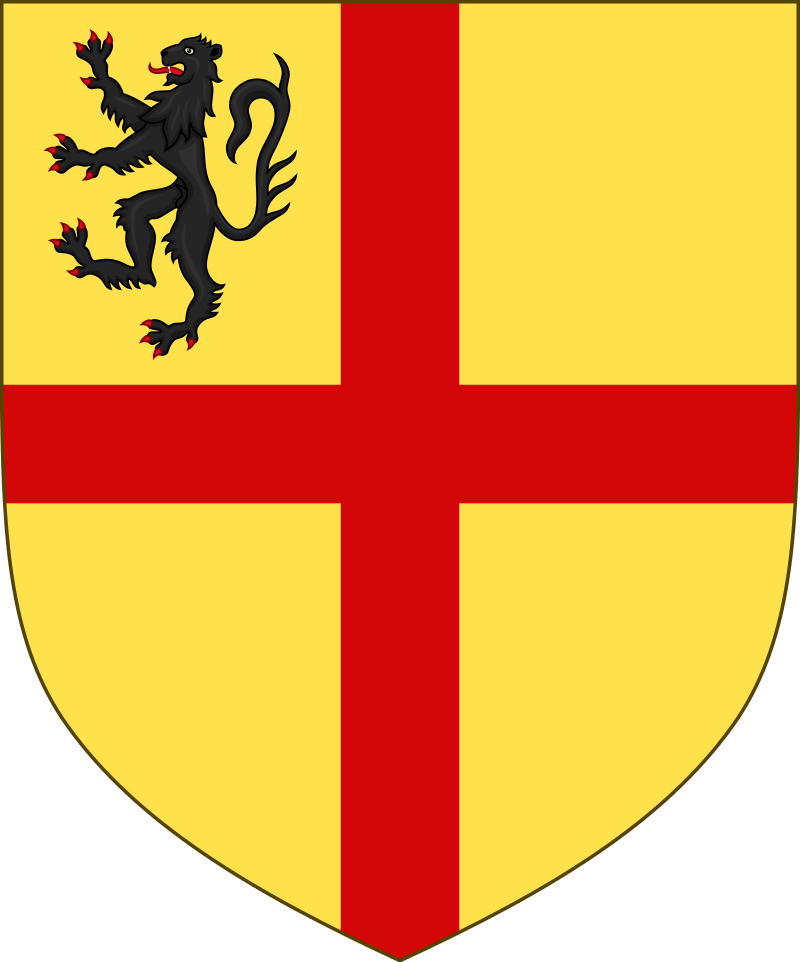
- Arms of de Burgh/Burke of Clanricarde: Or, a cross gules in the first quarter a lion rampant sable
- Children: Redmond Burke, Baron Leitrim; William Burke; John Oge Burke; Tomás Burke
- Parent: Richard Burke, 2nd Earl of Clanricarde
- Relatives: Ulick (brother)

John "na Seamar" Burke, Baron Leitrim (Irish: Seán mac an Iarla a Búrc; /ˈliːtrəm/; LEE-trəm; died 1583), also known as John of the Shamrocks, was one of the notorious half-brothers called the meic an Iarla ('sons of the earl'), whose conflicts with each other and their father, Richard Burke, 2nd Earl of Clanricarde, caused devastation to south Connacht several times between the late 1560s and early 1580s.

== Background ==
Richard's eldest son from his first marriage was Ulick. John was the son of one of Richard's later marriages, which were valid in Gaelic law but not English common law. He was his father's chosen heir, but his being illegitimate in the Irish Peerage meant the Earldom of Clanricarde would fall to Ullick. Richard's son William from a third marriage was another rival. The Tudor reconquest of Ireland, the Composition of Connacht, and the Irish Reformation provided a wider background of shifting alliances and conflicts to the family rivalry.

== Career ==
One of John Burke's most notorious acts was the destruction of Athenry in 1572, after which he demolished most of the castles in Clanricarde, afterwards plundering south County Galway, County Roscommon, and crossed the Shannon into County Westmeath, where he burned Mullingar, Meelick and Athlone. Following this, he led his army west, attacked Galway, and plundered Connemara.

== Death and family ==
John was ambushed and killed by his brother Ullick on 11 November 1583, and buried in Athenry. He had at least four sons:

- Redmond Burke, Baron Leitrim, became an important rebel commander during the Nine Years' War.
- William Burke, Lord of Bealatury
- John Óge Burke
- Tomás Burke

== Annals of the Four Masters ==
From the Annals of the Four Masters:

1572: A proclamation was issued by the President of the province of Connaught, Sir Edward Phiton, about the festival of St. Patrick, respecting a court to be held at Galway of all those who were under the authority of the Queen, from Limerick to Sligo. At this summons came the Earl of Clanrickard and his sons, Ulick and John, with the chiefs of their people; the descendants of Richard Oge Burke; the Lower Mac William, i.e. John Burke, the son of Oliver, son of John, together with the Lower Burkes; and the Dal-Cais, with their adherents. Upon their arrival before the President in Galway, the two sons of the Earl of Clanrickard, Ulick and John, heard some rumour, on account of which they dreaded the President, and privily fled from the town. When the President heard of this fact, he made prisoners of the chieftains of Clanrickard, and left them in durance in the town; and he himself, with the Earl (the father of the two already referred to, whom he had arrested), proceeded to Athlone, and from thence to Dublin, where he left the Earl, and (then) he himself returned again to Athlone. As soon as the sons of the Earl heard of that affair, they ordered the soldiers and mercenaries of the neighbouring territories to repair to them without delay. That summons was promptly responded to by the Clann-Sweeny of Upper and Lower Connaught, and by the Clann-Donnell Galloglagh (who had many hundreds of Scots along with them). Before however they had time to assemble together, the President took his forces and soldiers with him to Galway, and carried with him the ordnance and rising-out of that town to Achadh-na-n-iubhar, the castle of the sons of Donnell O'Flaherty; and it was Murrough-na-dtuagh, the son of Teige O'Flaherty, that induced him to go on this expedition. Two of the sons of Donnell O'Flaherty were left about i.e. in care of the castle. The President, after having half destroyed the castle, took complete possession of it, and left such part of it as remained undestroyed to Murrough-na-dtuagh O'Flaherty. He then returned to Galway, and passed through Clanrickard and Hy-Many to Athlone, without receiving battle or opposition.

1574: The sons of the Earl of Clanrickard, namely, William and John, violated their pledged word and brotherly friendship; and John Burke took many Scotch and Irish mercenaries into his service. The Earl of Ormond afterwards obtained protection for him; and he delivered up hostages into the hands of the Earl, to be kept for the Queen.

1583: The son of the Earl of Clanrickard, namely, John Burke, the son of Rickard Saxonagh, son of Ulick-na-gCeann, son of Richard, son of Ulick of Cnoc-tuagh, was unfraternally slain in an assault at night, by his brother Ulick Burke. Alas! woe to that brother who wished to slay his other brother about the partition of a territory, for this world is the world of every one in turn. It was a great pity that Ulick did not ponder within his mind that 'shoulders are bare without a brother,’ and that 'one makes not an army'; instead of this, he perforated his body, and pierced his side, so that he left him stretched out lifeless; and it was with difficulty that his body was obtained by those who carried him to Athenry, where the hero was buried. The death of this good man weighed upon the hearts of the people of his territory, on account of his good sense, his personal form, his noble birth, his hospitality, his nobleness, and his renowned achievements.

== Genealogy ==
          Richard Sassanach
                          |
  ---------------------------------------
 =?          =?                         =?
  |          |                          |
  |          |                          |
 Ullick John, d. 1583.         William, d. June 1581.
            =various women
             |
  ___________|_______________________________________________________________________________________________
  |                          |                           |                             |                    |
  |                          |                           |                             |                    |
  Redmond, d.1602.   William, d.1616.        John Óge, executed June 1601.   Tomás, fl. 1600–02.    ?son, fl. 1583?

== See also ==
- House of Burgh, an Anglo-Norman and Hiberno-Norman dynasty founded in 1193
- Earl of Clanricarde
