= William de Burgh (disambiguation) =

William de Burgh may refer to:

- William de Burgh (1157–1206), Lord of Connaught
- William Óg de Burgh (died 1270), Irish chieftain
- William Donn de Burgh, 3rd Earl of Ulster (1312–1333), noble in the Peerage of Ireland
- William de Burgh (MP) (1741–1808), Anglo-Irish theologian, politician and anti-slavery campaigner
- William de Burgh (philosopher) (1866–1943), British philosopher.

== See also ==
- William Burgh (disambiguation)
- William Burke (disambiguation), once used interchangeably with de Burgh
