= Redmond Burke, Baron Leitrim =

Irish noble and soldier (living c.1580s–1602)

Redmond Burke Baron Leitrim
- Redmond de Búrca
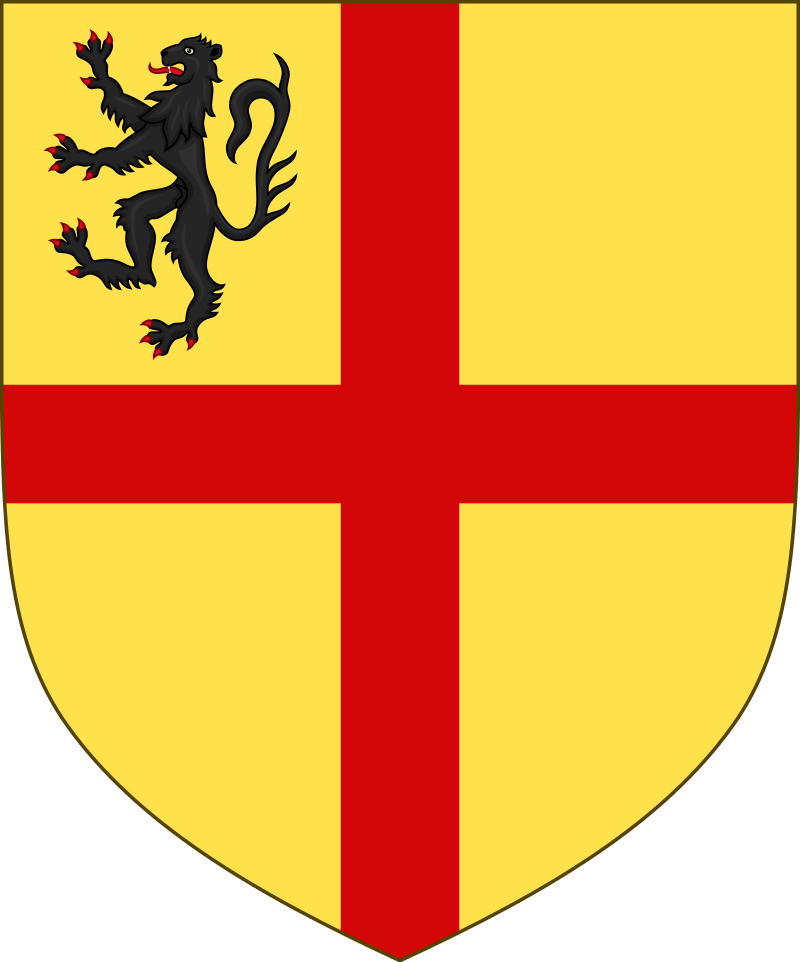
- Arms of de Burgh/Burke of Clanricarde: Or, a cross gules in the first quarter a lion rampant sable
- Parent: John na Seamar Burke
- Relatives: William Burke (brother); John Óge Burke (brother); Tomás Burke (brother)

Redmond Burke, Baron Leitrim (/ˈliːtrəm/; LEE-trəm; fl. 1580s–1602) was an Irish noble and soldier who served in Spain and later in Ireland during the Nine Years' War.

== Family background ==
Burke was a member of the Burke family of Clanricarde, in what is now County Galway. He was one of five brothers who left Ireland to enrol in Spanish service in the late 1580s. They were in Ireland in time to participate in the Nine Years' War. They were sons of John na Seamar Burke (died 1583) and nephews of Ulick Burke, 3rd Earl of Clanricarde (died 1601).

Redmond was the eldest of the family, and styled Baron or Lord Leitrim, after his father.

== Desolation of Ormond (1600) ==
The Annals of the Four Masters, sub anno 1600, state:

Redmond Burke, the son of John of the Shamrocks, son of James, son of Richard Saxonagh, was at this time an illustrious and celebrated gentleman, according to the usages of the Irish. He and his brothers, John Oge, William, and Thomas, remained in the two Ormonds, and in Ely, during the summer, autumn, and winter, of this year; and so great and numerous were the troops and forces of these sons of John Burke, that they ravaged and desolated all the adjacent territories and cantreds. They took many castles on this occasion in Ely and Ormond, among which were Suidhe-an-roin, Bel-atha-Dun-Gair, and Cuil-O'nDubhain, in Ely; and Port-a-Tolchain, in Ormond.

== Annals (1601) ==
The Annals of the Four Masters have a number of extracts concerning Redmond and his brothers, sub anno 1601:

The sons of John of the Shamrocks, the son of Rickard Saxonagh, of whom we have already treated, happened to be encamped during the first days of the month of January in O'Meagher's country, in Ikerrin. Spies and scouts came upon them in that place from the Butlers, after it had been reported by some of their gentlemen that an advantage and opportunity could be had by attacking them in the place where they then were. For this purpose Sir Walter, the son of John, son of James Butler, and Mac Pierce, i.e. James, the son of Edmond, son of James, with some of the gentlemen of the two countries, i.e. of the county of Tipperary and of the county of Kilkenny, came to a conference and meeting on a certain night, at an appointed place. The result of their conference, and the resolution to which they agreed, was, to attack the Connaught camp at day-break next morning.

An unusual accident and a sad fatality occurred to the camp of the Bourkes, namely, an advantage was taken of their want of watching, so that their enemies came into the midst of them. They left them lying mangled and slaughtered, pierced and blood-stained corpses, throughout their tents and booths.

On this occasion was slain O'Shaughnessy, i.e. John, the son of Gilla-Duv, son of Dermot, son of William, who had been banished from his patrimony, as indeed had been all those plunderers who were along with the sons of John Burke. John Oge, the son of John Burke, was taken prisoner, and conveyed to Kilkenny, to be confined. Redmond Burke, and William, together with a party of their people, escaped from this affray; and they went from thence into Ely, but they did not remain long in that territory, when they proceeded into Ulster, leaving the castles which until then they had possessed in East Munster under slender guard. On their arrival among the Irish of the North, namely, O'Neill and O'Donnell, Redmond proceeded to hire soldiers, to march into Clanrickard; and, as soon as he had mustered a sufficient number of these, he led them, during the first days of spring, across the Erne, and passed along the borders of Breifny O'Rourke, through the counties of Sligo and Roscommon, and across the River Suck, into Clann-Conway. He made a prisoner of the lord of this territory, namely, Mac David (Fiach, son of Hubert Boy, son of William, son of Thomas); and he afterwards proceeded to Tuath-an-Chalaidh, in the upper part of Hy-Many, in the county of Galway. When the Earl of Clanrickard, i.e. Ulick Burke, heard of this thing, he went to the eastern extremity of his country, to await and watch Redmond; but, notwithstanding all his vigilance, Redmond, on the thirteenth night of the month of March, without being heard or noticed by the Earl or his sentinels, passed by them into Clanrickard, until he arrived in the district of Kinel-Feichin, in the south of the barony of Leitrim, in the county of Galway. Towards the end of that night, and by the dawning of day, Redmond sent forth his marauding parties through every town of that district, from Magh-glass to Crannog-Meg-Cnaimhin, and from Coill-bhreac to the mountain; and before the noon of that day Redmond had in his power the greater part of the property, and all the moveable effects, of that territory. He afterwards went to take up his abode in the woods situated in the upper part of that district, and continued for four or five days moving about in this manner, plundering his neighbours, and strengthening the ramparts around himself, until the Earl of Clanrickard, accompanied by all the troops he had been able to muster in the district, arrived, and pitched his camp at the monastery of Kinel-Fheichin. Thus they remained for four or five days, during which time some persons not illustrious were slain between them, until Teige, the son of Brian-na-Murtha, son of Brian Ballagh, son of Owen O'Rourke, arrived with bold companies of sharp-armed soldiers to assist Redmond. When these two parties combined overtook the Earl, he left the camp in which he was, and proceeded through the passes into Clanrickard. The others pursued him to Loughrea; and, the Earl and his people escaping from them on this occasion, they traversed, plundered, and burned the country from Leitrim to Ard-Maeldubhain and as far as the gate of Feadán, in the west of Kinelea. At this time they lost a Munster lord of a territory, i.e. MacDonough, i.e. Donough, the son of Cormac Oge, son of Cormac. What brought him on this expedition was this, he had been carried off as a hostage by O'Neill in the spring of the preceding year, and had remained in Ulster until having regained his liberty he set out with those sons of John Burke, and so fell in this war of the Clann-William.

When Redmond arrived with his marauders on the confines of Thomond, they pitched a camp on the western side of Loch-Cutra. Here he was joined by a young gentleman of the Dal-Cais, namely, Teige, the son of Turlough, son of Donnell, son of Conor O'Brien, who had been induced to join him through the advice and solicitation of bad and foolish men, and without consulting or taking counsel of his father or the Earl of Clanrickard, to whom he was related and friendly. When the sons of John Burke and Teige O'Brien had entered into a confederacy with each other, Teige requested, in three days afterwards, that he should get a company to go on an incursion into some angle of Thomond. He was not refused this request, for some of the gentlemen of the camp went along with him, with their kerns. Among these were William, the son of John Burke, and the son of Mac William Burke, i.e. Walter, the son of William, son of David, son of Edmond, son of Ulick. On leaving the camp, they passed along the borders of Kinelea, and Echtghe, and Kinel-Dunghaile. They sent off marauding parties along both banks of the Fergus, into the lower part of Hy-Fearmaic, and the upper part of Clann-Cuilein. Some of them proceeded to Baile-Ui-Aille, and near Clonroad; and they returned that night with their spoils to Cill-Reachtais, in Upper Clann-Cuilein. On their leaving this town, on the following morning, they were overtaken by the rising-out of the two Clann-Cuileins, with their gentlemen. They were also overtaken by the companies of the Earl of Thomond. These pursuing forces of Thomond proceeded to shoot at the insurgents, and killed many of their men, from thence to Miliuc-Ui-Ghrada, in the east of Cenel-Donghaile. The pursuers then returned, and the others carried off the prey to their camp, after having lost some of their gentlemen and common people. Among these was that son of Mac William whom we have already mentioned, namely, Walter, the son of William Burke. Teige, the son of Turlough O' Brien, was wounded the same day by the shot of a ball; so that on his arrival at the camp he was obliged, in despite of his unbending mind and his impetuous spirit, to betake himself to the bed of sickness, and go under the hands of physicians.

A great number of the Queen's people came from various places to assist the Earl of Clanrickard. Of these were eight or nine standards of soldiers, sent from the President of the two provinces of Munster. Thither came the Earl's own son, who had been for some time before along with the Lord Justice, with a band of foreign soldiers; thither also came the Deputy of the Governor of the province of Connaught, and there came also an auxiliary force from Galway.

When the sons of John Burke heard of this muster, they removed back eastwards, along the mountain, into the fastnesses of the district of Kinel-Fheichin, and remained in the ready huts in which they had been before. They had not been long here when the sons of the Earl, namely, the Baron of Dunkellin and Sir Thomas Burke, with every one of his sons that was capable af bearing arms, arrived in the district in pursuit of them, at the head of very numerous forces, and pitched a splendid and well-furnished camp in the very middle of the district. The Earl of Clanrickard himself was not in this camp, for he had been attacked by a fit of sickness, and a severe, sharp disease, the week before, so that he was not able to undertake an expedition at this time.

When the Deputy of the Governor of Connaught and the Baron of Dunkellin received intelligence that Teige O'Brien was lying severely wounded in that camp of Redmond Burke, they sent him a protection in behalf of the Queen, upon which he repaired to them. The Baron sent an escort with him to Leitrim, one of the Earl's castles. But he did not live long there, for he died shortly afterwards; and he was buried successively at Loughrea and Athenry in one week. Alas to the country that lost this young scion! He was expert at every warlike weapon and military engine used by the Irish on the field of battle. He was full of energy and animation, and distinguished for agility, expertness, mildness, comeliness, renown, and hospitality.

As for the camps in the district of Kinel-Fheichin, they were front to front, guarding against each other daily, from the festival of St. Patrick to the end of the month of April, when the provisions and stores of flesh meat of the sons of John Burke began to grow scant and to fail; and they, therefore, proceeded to quit the territory; and after their departure they carried off a prey from O'Madden, i.e. Donnell, the son of John, son of Breasal, and then proceeded across the Suck. The sons of the Earl, in the mean time, continued to pursue them; and many persons were slain between them on this occasion. The sons of John Burke then went to Tirconnell, to O'Donnell; and the sons of the Earl returned to their own country and their houses.

== Battle of Kinsale (1601) ==
Both William and Redmond were some of the chiefs who were along with Red Hugh O'Donnell at Kinsale. In the aftermath of the Battle of Kinsale it was determined that O'Donnell, Redmond, the son of John Burke, and Captain Hugh Mus, the son of Robert, should go to Spain to complain of their distresses and difficulties to the King of Spain. O'Neill and O'Donnell determined that These chiefs left some of their neighbouring confederates in Munster, to plunder it in their absence, namely: Captain Tyrrell, the other sons of John Burke, and other gentlemen besides them.

== See also ==
- House of Burgh, an Anglo-Norman and Hiberno-Norman dynasty founded in 1193
- Earl of Clanricarde
