= William Berg (classicist) =

American classicist (1938–2021)

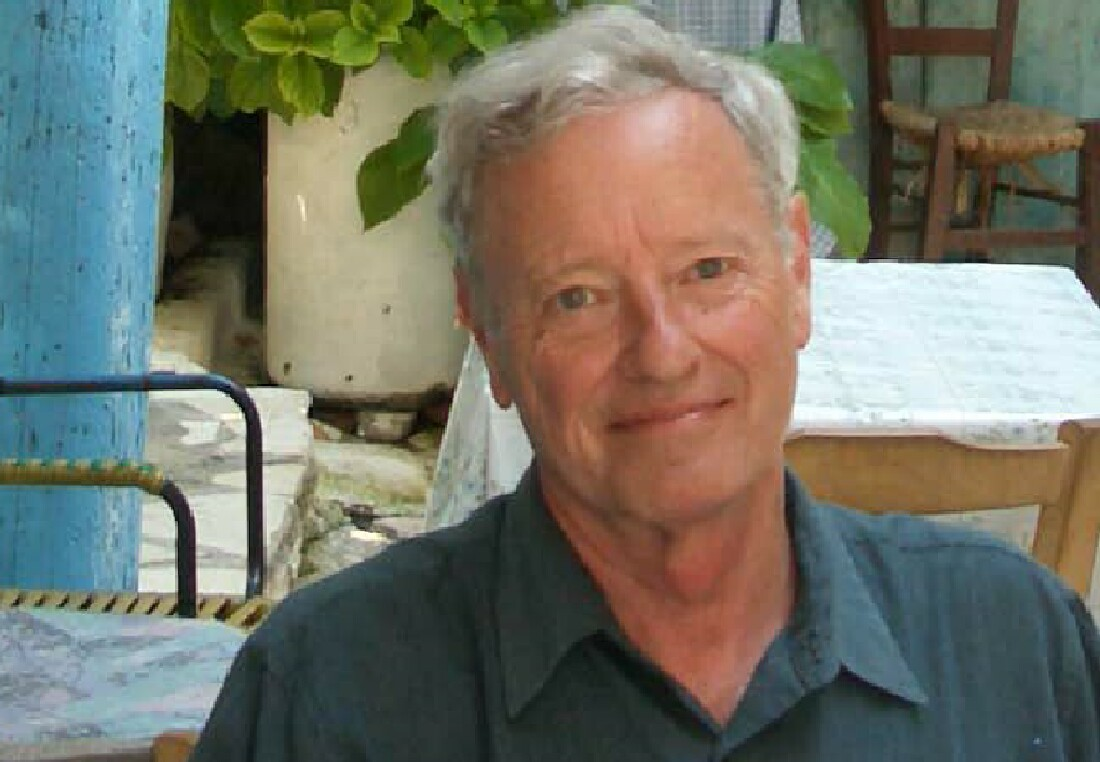
- William Berg in 2005
- Born: August 13, 1938; Berkeley, California, U.S.
- Died: May 16, 2021 (aged 82); Portland, Oregon, U.S.
- Education: Johns Hopkins University; Princeton University
- Scientific career
- Fields: Classics
- Workplaces: University of California Stanford University ‘Atenisi University

William Berg III (August 13, 1938 – May 16, 2021), was an American classicist and historian from Gearhart, Oregon. On his mother’s side he was a descendant of pioneers (the Kernses) who had migrated from Indiana to Oregon in 1852. Berg grew up in Boulder, Colorado, where his father taught Constitutional Law at the University of Colorado, and in Washington, D.C., where he witnessed the McCarthy era in the shadow of his father’s boss and mentor, Oregon Senator Wayne Morse.

== Education ==
After immersion in ancient Greek under the tutelage of Anselm Strittmatter, O.S.B., he majored in Classics at Johns Hopkins University. Graduating with academic honors in 1960, he went on to earn a Ph.D. at Princeton University in 1966. Awarded a Fulbright Grant, he spent the academic year 1960-61 at the American School of Classical Studies in Greece, undergoing archaeological training through excavation at ancient Corinth. That training led to participation in the Samothrace excavations in the summer of 1964. Awarded a Dankstipendium, Berg went on to spend a year at the University of Tübingen in Germany, mentored by Wolfgang Schadewaldt, where he completed drafts of his Ph.D. dissertation on sources for Virgil's Bucolics.

== Teaching and Work ==
Berg’s formal teaching career began at the University of California in Los Angeles. He went on to teach at Stanford University from 1967 to 1974. While there he published a book, Early Virgil, along with several articles on Greek myth, anthropology, and religion, and led a student archaeological tour (Stanford-In-Greece) in the summer of 1974, where he witnessed the momentous fall of the Greek military junta and the return of those they had exiled.

Since 1975 Berg lived in Gearhart, a small town on the Oregon coast, where he won election to the City Council and helped draft its Comprehensive Land Use Plan, organizing and directing resource inventories, surveys, and data analysis. As a result of this planning activity, Gearhart was able to avoid an expensive municipal sewer and completed an award-winning solar retrofit to the Fire House. The first edition of his history of Gearhart was published in 2001. Berg has kept up his studies of ancient Greek and Latin, occasionally publishing new material, including an e-book translation of Philogelos, the world’s oldest extant joke book. In 1987 he took a teaching position at St. John’s College in Santa Fe, New Mexico. Lured away to the Kingdom of Tonga by a Fulbright Lectureship in 1989, he spent the year teaching and gaining new insights into ancient philosophy from Futa Helu, founder of ‘Atenisi University in Nuku’alofa. Before returning to Oregon, he assisted Futa in completing a ground-breaking work on Heraclitus.

Berg’s collaboration with the Parisian scholar Jean-Claude Picot has resulted in the publication of several articles on Empedocles. Berg’s interest in New Testament and Patristic Greek was instigated by the cryptographer Michael Wood, and has resulted in the translation into vernacular English of the entire New Testament, along with other works related to ancient Judaism and early Christianity; those include his published, annotated translation of Cramer's Catena, a collection of fourth-century comments on Paul’s letter to the Galatians.

Since 2005, he was a member of Translatum Forum, where he served as moderator of the ancient Greek and Latin boards. This activity has sustained and enhanced his familiarity with the modern Greek language, as may be evidenced in Berg’s translation of Romiosini by the revolutionary poet Yiannis Ritsos, which was published in 2014.

== Published works ==
- Early Virgil (University of London Press, 1974)
- Gearhart Remembered (Gearhart Homeowners Association, 2001, 2013)
- Philogelos: A Laugh Addict (ebook: Yudu Publishing 2008)
- Yiannis Ritsos, Romiosini (translation: Smokestack Books 2014)
- Paul’s Letter to the Galatians: A Fourth-century View (Consolamini Publications 2015)
- Plus numerous published articles 1965 — 2018, listed in Academia.edu page.
