= Fotua =

Settlement on Foa Island

Coordinates: 19.749°S 174.318°W

Fotua is a settlement on Foa island, Tonga. It had a population of 259 in 2016.
