= David Dolidze =

Georgian and Soviet mathematician

David Egorovich Dolidze
- Born: 2 February 1908; Buknari, Georgian SSR
- Died: 1960
- Education: Tbilisi State University (1928)
- Known for: Uniqueness theorem for solutions to Navier–Stokes equations
- Scientific career
- Fields: Fluid dynamics; Mathematical physics
- Workplaces: Tbilisi State University (1934); Institute of Mathematics of the Georgian SSR Academy of Sciences (1935)

David Egorovich Dolidze (Georgian: დავით დოლიძე, Russian: Давид Егорович Долидзе) (2 February [O.S. 20 January] 1908 – 1960) was a Georgian and Soviet mathematician, known from his work in the mathematical theory of fluid motion. In particular he rediscovered an important uniqueness theorem for the classical solutions to the Navier–Stokes equations for an incompressible fluid, previously proved by Emanuele Foà.

== Life and academic career ==
Born on 2 February 1908 in the village of Buknari, He graduated from Tbilisi State University in 1928. From 1934 he started working in his Alma Mater, and one year later, in 1935, he also started doing research at the Mathematics Institute of the Georgian Academy of Science. In 1945 he earned both the Doktor Nauk degree and the title of professor.

== Selected publications ==
- Dolidze, D. E. (1954), Единственность решения основной граничной задачи вязкой несжимаемой жидкости, Doklady Akademii Nauk SSSR, novaya Seriya (in Russian), 96 (3): 437–439, Zbl 0059.19702.
- Dolidze, D. E. (1955), "On the uniqueness of the solution of the boundary value problem of viscous incompressible liquid", Trudy Tbilisskogo Matematicheskogo Instituta (in Russian), 21: 261–267, Zbl 0066.19703.
- Долидзе, Д. Е. (1960), Некоторые вопросы нестационарного течения вязкой жидкости: метод потенциалов и интегральных уравнений (in Russian), Тбилиси: Издательство Академия наук Грузинской ССР, p. 331, Zbl 0111.23104.
- Долидзе, Давид Егорович (1980), Труды [К 70-летию со дня рождения математика] [Works] (in Russian), Тбилиси: Тбилисский университет, p. 210. His "Works", published by the Tbilisi State University on the occasion of his 70th birthday.

== See also ==
- Euler equations
- Fluid mechanics
- Dario Graffi
- Olga Ladyzhenskaya
- James Serrin
