= Emanuele Foà =

Italian engineer and physicist (1892–1949)

- Born: 16 August 1892; Savigliano
- Died: 9 October 1949 (aged 57); Bologna
- Education: Politecnico di Torino (1919)
- Known for: Theory of Navier–Stokes equations; Heat conduction theory
- Scientific career
- Fields: Engineering physics; Fluid dynamics
- Workplaces: Politecnico di Torino; Università degli Studi di Bologna
- Academic advisors: Benedetto Luigi Montel
- Notable students: Dario Graffi

Emanuele Foà (16 August 1892 – 9 October 1949) was an Italian engineer and engineering physicist, known for his contribution to mathematical fluid dynamics. In particular he proved the first known uniqueness theorem for the solutions to the three-dimensional Navier–Stokes equations for incompressible fluids in bounded domains.

== Life and academic career ==
He was born in Savigliano, in a Jewish family of distinguished professionals and officials: his father, Teodoro Foà, was a military physician serving as a major the Royal Italian Army, who died at the age of 42 due to the viral fevers he contracted during the Eritrea war campaign. Despite having lost his father at a young age and having a disabled sister, he succeeded in studying engineering at the Polytechnic University of Turin thanks to a scholarship. The outbreak of World War I in Italy in 1915 forced him to interrupt his engineering studies: he joined the army and served as an artillery officer for the years 1916 and 1917. On 28 October 1917, during the battle of Caporetto, he was taken prisoner and spent a year in a prisoner camp located in Germany.

At the end of the war, notwithstanding his health problems, he successfully completed his university studies: he got his Laurea degree in industrial engineering at the Polytechnic University of Turin in August 1919. From 1 December 1919 he started to work at his alma mater, as assistant professor to the chair of thermal engineering, which at the time was held by Benedetto Luigi Montel. In 1927 he participated and won a competitive examination for a professorship in engineering physics at the then called "Royal School of Engineering of Bologna": in 1928 he left Turin for Bologna, succeeding, after a brief time period, to Luigi Donati who had held the chair for several decades. The very same year he met Dario Graffi, who had earlier become assistant professor to the chair of engineering physics: their cordial relations became over time a deep and tenacious friendship, lasted until Foà's death.

In Bologna, he passionately devoted himself to teaching as his course handouts, published in several editions, testify: the same time was fruitful for his researches activity, and in 1930 he was appointed ordinary professor.

=== The years from 1938 to 1945: the "Italian Racial Laws" and World War II ===
His teaching at the university was interrupted in 1938, the year the Italian Government approved the "Racial Laws", "unreasonable, before being unjust". Forced by the law to an early retirement, the Council of the faculty of engineering substituted him with Graffi: he was very happy with the council choice, due to their friendship and mutual esteem. For his part, Graffi, who could not adopt Foà's handouts due to prohibition imposed by the laws on publications by Jewish authors, published them under his name: cautiously, he kept sending to Foà's house students for private lessons, in order to help him supplement his small retirement pension.

During the World War II period, Foà and his wife managed to stay in Bologna but had to change their accommodation frequently, being hosted by friendly families. In October 1943, being warned by Dino Zanobetti about a raid of the police, he and his wife left their house and went to an apartment made available by Dante Piccioli, a wealthy engineer and friend of theirs. More than a month later, on 7 December, Bologna was bombed and the apartment where Foà and his wife resided was destroyed: being at home, Foà was severely wounded in the right leg and was brought to the Sant'Orsola Hospital.

=== Honours ===
In 1933, he was elected corresponding member of the Accademia delle Scienze dell'Istituto di Bologna and, after being reintegrated in his role of professor at the University of Bologna in 1945, he became ordinary member in 1947. Also in 1947, jointly with some fellow engineers, he founded the Bologna Section of the Associazione Termotecnica Italiana, he was elected as his first president.

== Work ==
=== Teaching activity ===
Si dedicò all'insegnamento con grande passione, lo provano i suoi corsi di dispense di cui si fecero diverse edizioni e in cui si manifesta la sua personalità didattica ad un tempo profonda e semplificatrice.

— Dario Graffi, (Graffi 1949–1950, p. 51)

=== Research activity ===
Al primo periodo bolognese del Foà sono soprattutto da ascriversi le importanti ricerche sull'analisi dimensionale e sulle sue applicazioni allo studio dei processi tecnici in vista di dedurre, da tali analisi, metodi semplici e sicuri per stabilire importanti proprietà delle equazioni differenziali che tali processi reggono, pur senza integrarle.

— Paolo Dore, (Dore 1952, p. 158)

== Selected publications ==
- Foà, Emanuele (January 1926), "Sulla legge di variazione dell'effetto Volta in funzione della temperatura" [On the temperature dependence law for the Volta effect], Il Nuovo Cimento (in Italian), 3 (1): 49–66, Bibcode:1926NCim....3...49F, doi:10.1007/BF02961052, S2CID 120775245.
- Foà, Emanuele (January 1926a), "Sulla esperienza di Désormes e Clément" [On the experiment of Désormes and Clément], Il Nuovo Cimento (in Italian), 3 (1): 101–113, Bibcode:1926NCim....3..101F, doi:10.1007/BF02961056, S2CID 120123311.
- Foà, Emanuele (31 December 1929), "Sull'impiego della analisi dimensionale nello studio del moto turbolento. – Prima nota" [On the use of dimensional analysis in the study of turbulent motion. – First note], L'Industria: rivista tecnica ed economica illustrata (in Italian), XLIII (24): 426–431. In this article, Foà proves his uniqueness theorem for classical solutions to the Navier-Stokes equation.
- Foà, Emanuele (30 April 1930), "Sull'impiego della analisi dimensionale nello studio del moto turbolento. – Seconda nota" [On the use of dimensional analysis in the study of turbulent motion. – Second note], L'Industria: rivista tecnica ed economica illustrata (in Italian), XLIV (8): 203–226. This is the companion paper to (Foà 1929), where Foà describes his rigorous approach to dimensional analysis.
- Foà, Emanuele (October 1930), "Sulla trasmissione di calore per irradiamento. Prima nota" [On radiative heat transfer. First note], Il Politecnico (in Italian), LXXVIII (10): 601–604.
- Foà, Emanuele (January 1931), "Sulla trasmissione di calore per irradiamento. Seconda nota" [On radiative heat transfer. Second note], Il Politecnico (in Italian), LXXIX (1): 23–32.
- Foà, Emanuele (1948), "Sulla trasmissione del calore in mezzi isotropi o anisotropi con coefficiente di conduttività variabile con la temperatura" [On heat transfer through isotropic or anisotropic media with temperature-dependent conductivity coefficient], Memorie dell'Accademia delle Scienze dell'Istituto di Bologna, Classe di Scienze Fisiche, Serie X (in Italian), 4: 119–122, MR 0028516, Zbl 0037.41501.
- Foà, Emanuele (1951), Giulianini, Arturo (ed.), Fondamenti di termodinamica [Foundations of thermodynamics], Manuali scientifici Zanichelli (in Italian), Bologna: Zanichelli Editore, pp. XVI+255, MR 0048340, Zbl 0043.19511, also reviewed by Mandò, Manlio (December 1951), "Emanuele Foà: Fondamenti di Termodinamica", Il Nuovo Cimento (in Italian), 8 (12): 1017–1018, Bibcode:1951NCim....8.1017M, doi:10.1007/BF02781954, S2CID 186234854.

== See also ==
- David Dolidze
- Euler equations
- Fluid mechanics
- Olga Ladyzhenskaya
- James Serrin
