= Patrizia Valduga =

Italian poet and translator (born 1953)

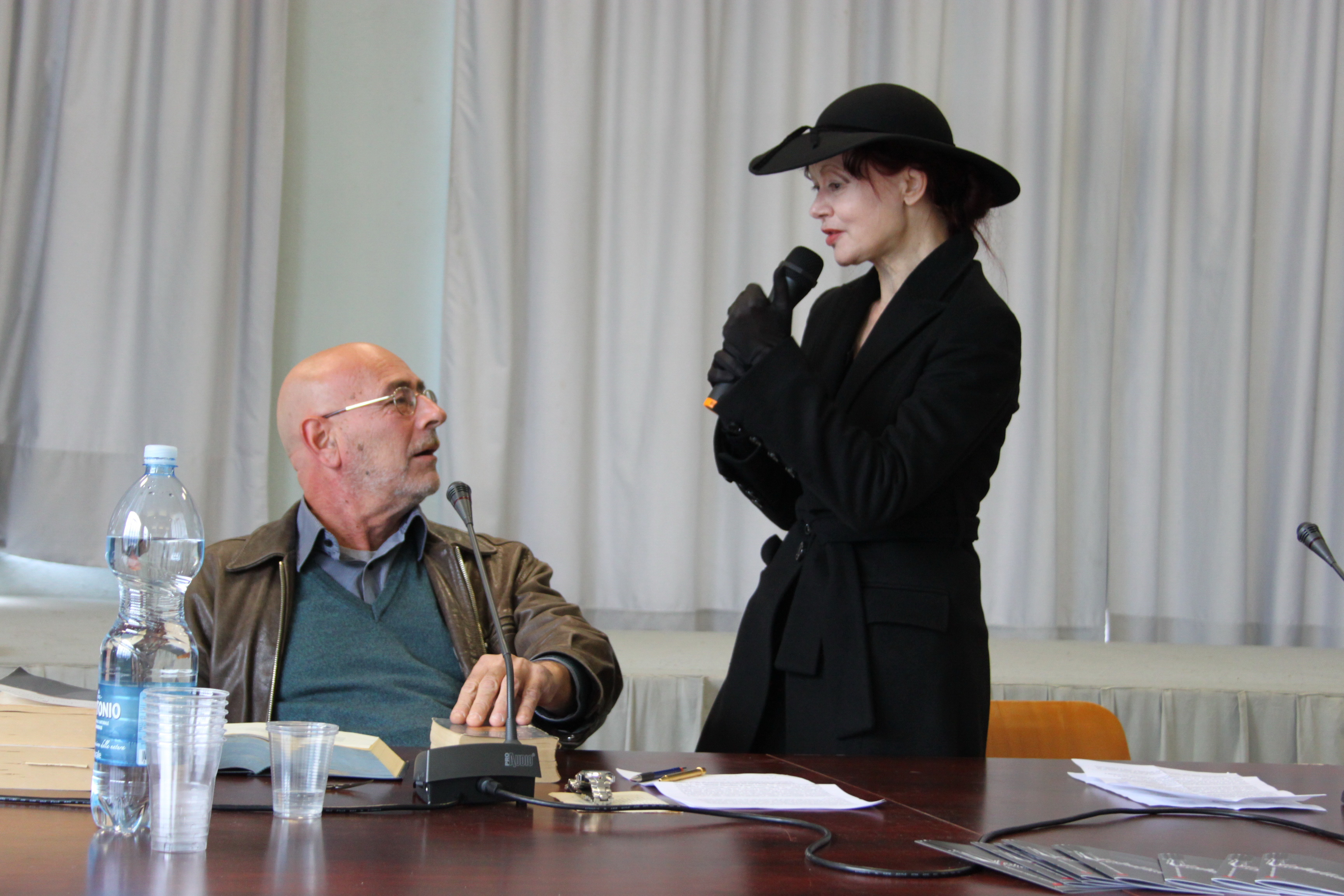
Patrizia Valduga with Mario Santagostini

Patrizia Valduga (born 20 May 1953 in Castelfranco Veneto) is an Italian poet and translator.

She was born in Castelfranco Veneto in the province of Treviso. She studied medicine at the University of Padua, but after three years transferred to the Ca' Foscari University of Venice where she received a degree in literature. Valduga established the monthly literary magazine Poesia and served as its director for a year. She also contributed to other publications including la Repubblica.

Some of her poetry reads like theatrical monologue and several of her works have been adapted for the stage.

She has translated works by Donne, Molière, Mallarmé, Shakespeare, Kantor and Beckett into Italian.

Valduga lived with the poet Giovanni Raboni in Milan.

== Selected works ==
- Medicamenta (Remedies), poetry (1982), received the Viareggio Prize
- La tentazione (Temptation), poetry (1985)
- Donna di dolori, poetry (1991)
- Corsia degli incurabili, play (1996)
- Manfred, poetry (2003)
- Lezioni d'amore (Love lessons), poetry (2004)
