= William Burgh =

William Burgh may refer to:

- William de Burgh (MP) (1741–1808), also called William Burgh, Irish landowner who opposed slavery
- William Burgh (MP for Lanesborough) for Lanesborough (Parliament of Ireland constituency) during the Merciless Parliament
- William Burgh (fl. 1421), MP for Maldon (UK Parliament constituency) in 1421
- William Burgh (died 1552), MP for Great Yarmouth (UK Parliament constituency)

== See also ==
- William de Burgh (disambiguation)
- William Burke (disambiguation), once used interchangeably with Burgh
- William Berg (disambiguation)
