= Tomás Burke =

Irish gentleman and soldier (floruit 1600–1602)

Thomas Burke
- Tomás de Búrca
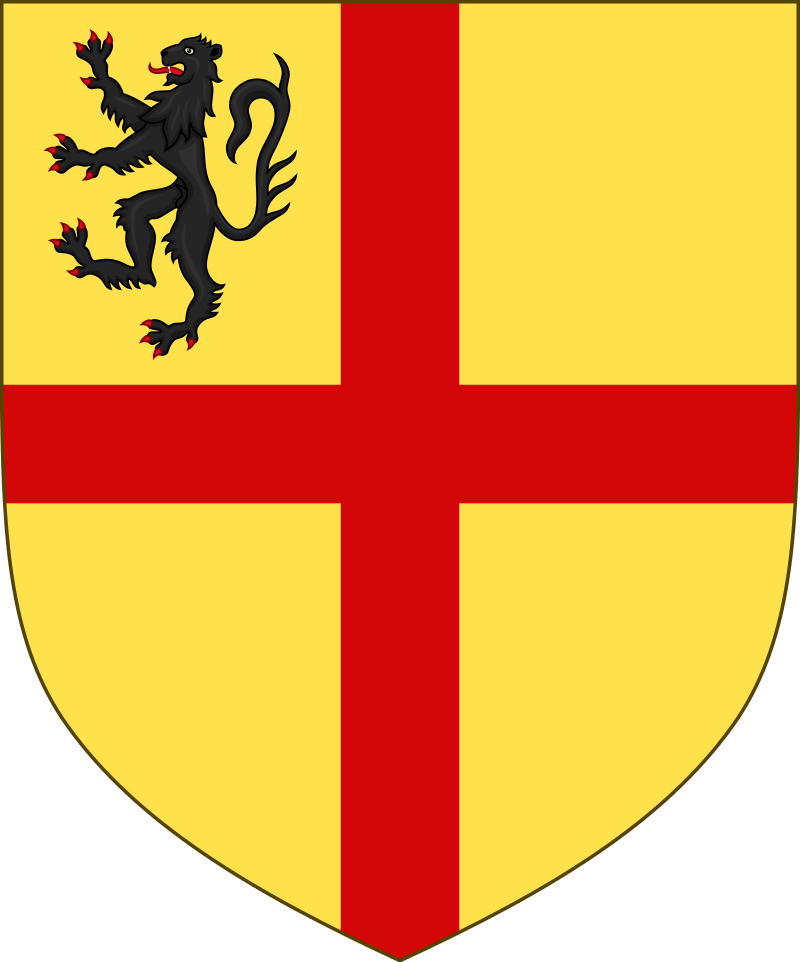
- Arms of de Burgh/Burke of Clanricarde: Or, a cross gules in the first quarter a lion rampant sable
- Parent: John na Seamar Burke
- Relatives: Redmond Burke (brother); William Burke (brother); John Óge Burke (brother)
- Military career
- Service years: 1593–1602
- Conflicts: Nine Years' War; Battle of Kinsale (1601)

Tomás Burke (fl. 1600–02) was an Irish gentleman and soldier who served during the Nine Years' War.

== Career ==
The most obscure of the four known sons of John na Seamar Burke (died 1583), Burke and his brothers - Redmond Burke, Baron Leitrim, William Burke, Lord of Bealatury and John Óge Burke - fought with Hugh O'Neill, 2nd Earl of Tyrone and Aodh Ruadh Ó Domhnaill against the English during the Nine Years' War (Ireland). He survived the Siege of Kinsale but is believed to have perished while marching with Donal Cam O'Sullivan Beare. His brother, William, is the only member of the family referred to when the marchers' reached Aughrim, County Galway.

== See also ==
- House of Burgh, an Anglo-Norman and Hiberno-Norman dynasty founded in 1193
- Earl of Clanricarde
- Clanricarde

== Bibliography ==
- Burke, John; Burke, Bernard (1844). Encyclopædia of Heraldry: Or General Armory of England, Scotland, and Ireland, Comprising a Registry of All Armorial Bearings from the Earliest to the Present Time, Including the Late Grants by the College of Arms. H. G. Bohn.
