= Sylvana Foa =

American journalist (born 1945)

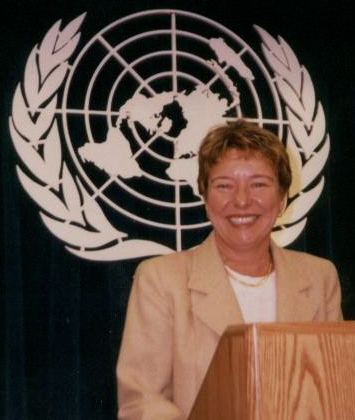
- Born: January 31, 1945 (age 81); Buffalo, New York, U.S.
- Education: Barnard College; Columbia University Graduate School of Journalism
- Occupations: Journalist; Spokesperson
- Known for: Spokeswoman for UN Secretary-General

Sylvana Foa (born January 31, 1945, in Buffalo, New York) is a former American journalist and public affairs specialist. She was the first woman to serve as the foreign editor of a major international news organisation, the first woman to serve as a news director of an American television network and the first woman to serve as spokesperson for the Secretary-General of the United Nations.

== Early life ==
Foa was born in Buffalo, New York. Her family moved to Troy, New York when she was seven. She graduated from Barnard College in 1967, having studied Political Science and Chinese at the East Asia Institute. She graduated from Columbia University Graduate School of Journalism in 1969, where she was also a special Carnegie Fellow.

Her father, Joseph V. Foa, had been forced to leave Italy when dictator Benito Mussolini enacted the Italian racial laws.

== Career ==
=== Journalism career ===
Foa began her journalism career in Phnom Penh, Cambodia, in the early 1970s. There she met Kate Webb, the United Press International (UPI) bureau chief, who advised her to go to Saigon, South Vietnam. Finding work as a stringer for Newsweek, she worked in South Vietnam until February 1971, when Newsweek's Indo-China correspondent François Sully was killed and Foa was sent to take over the Phnom Penh beat.

In Phnom Penh, she was considered one of the most dogged journalists, earning the enmity of high-level U.S. government officials. In April 1973, she was expelled from Cambodia at the request of the U.S. Embassy because of her reporting on the U.S. government's violation of the Cooper–Church Amendment. That amendment, passed in reaction to the 1970 invasion of Cambodia, forbade the provision of American advisers to the Cambodian army and prohibited all air operations in direct support of Cambodian forces.

Her reporting brought Richard Moose and James G. Lowenstein, Indo-China investigators for the United States Senate Committee on Foreign Relations, to Phnom Penh. When U.S. Embassy officials told them that Foa's stories were ridiculous, they went to her office to ask about the source of her reports. There they listened on Foa's transistor radio to embassy officials directing the bombing by American warplanes. The Senate ordered an immediate halt to the bombing of Cambodia.

After her expulsion from Cambodia, Foa joined UPI in Hong Kong. In October 1973, Prince Norodom Sihanouk agreed to an interview with her in Beijing. Foa spent nearly a month travelling across China. She was one of the first American reporters allowed to visit China, which was still in the throes of the Cultural Revolution. From Hong Kong, Foa had reporting stints in New Delhi, Rome, Vienna and Bangkok before being sent to Hong Kong as UPI's Asia Pacific news editor in 1982.

=== Foreign editor ===
In 1984, she was named a foreign editor of United Press International, becoming the first woman to be a foreign editor of a major international news organization. As a foreign editor, she supervised the work of 175 editors and correspondents covering news internationally. However, her tenure was short-lived. UPI was bought in 1986 by Mexican businessman Mario Vázquez Raña. Vázquez called Foa into his office and ordered her to cancel the appointment of the new chief correspondent, Luis Toscano, because Toscano "was not polite to the Mexican government." Foa refused and was fired.

=== News director and vice president for news ===
In 1986, she became vice president for news and news director of Univision, a Spanish-language network with 500 affiliates across the Americas. She thus became the first woman to serve as a news director of a major U.S. television network. She had been hired by Mexican magnate and Vázquez-rival Emilio Azcárraga Milmo to lead the network in the United States after Azcárraga read about Foa's firing, telling aides, "Anyone who tells Vázquez to stuff it is for us."

== United Nations career ==
=== United Nations High Commissioner for Refugees spokesperson ===
From 1991 to March 1995, Foa served as the spokesperson and Chief of Public Information for the United Nations High Commissioner for Refugees in Geneva. She is widely credited with turning the agency into one of the most respected of all UN organisations. Foa often covered refugee situations, speaking on behalf of displaced Kurds in Iraq, Banyarwanda in Rwanda and Bosnians.

When Serb troops moved against the Bosnian enclave of Srebrenica, Foa urged the international community to speed up the deployment of peacekeepers to the region. The more than 50,000 people crowded in Srebrenica, she said, "are very frightened because they know, as we've seen, that the life expectancy of a Bosnian soldier on Serb territory is very short." "People don't do dirty things at night when international observers are walking around," said Foa. "I don't think the Serbs will risk the wrath of the world by moving in." However, in July 1995, more than 8,000 Bosnian men and boys were massacred in the Srebrenica massacre by units of the Army of Republika Srpska led by General Ratko Mladic. 370 lightly armed Dutchbat of the United Nations Protection Force (UNPROFOR) were unable to stop the capture of the town and the subsequent massacre.

In July 1996, Burundi looked on the verge of repeating the 1994 Rwandan genocide beginning with the massacre of at least 304 people in Bugendana. Shortly thereafter, President Sylvestre Ntibantunganya was deposed. Foa urged the international community to act before they saw appalling TV images of slaughter. "Unfortunately, it is not until we see babies being macheted to death on TV that public opinion forces their governments into action," she said. "We do not want to see that this time." Together with the then head of the UN Peacekeeping Department, Kofi Annan, Foa aimed to put emotional pressure on the U.S. and other Western powers through the media. They wanted to shame the big powers into providing the political and logistics support to Burundi that they had refused for Rwanda in 1994. The effort failed.

She then briefly served as the Chief of Public Affairs for the World Food Programme in Rome.

=== Secretary-General spokesperson ===
In November 1995, the United Nations issued a press release announcing the appointment of Foa as the spokesperson for the Secretary-General of the United Nations effective January 1, 1996. She succeeded Joe B. Sills who was appointed as the director of the UN office in Washington D.C. She became the first woman to serve as a spokesperson for the Secretary-General. In a profile in The New York Times, Barbara Crossette wrote that "when Secretary General Boutros Boutros-Ghali put Ms. Foa, a strong-willed and irreverent former journalist, in charge of his public image and that of the world organization in January, some diplomats were aghast. They still are." As a spokesperson, Foa frequently clashed with the Clinton administration over its unpaid due to the UN and its seeming determination to oust Boutros-Ghali as the Secretary-General. Senator Richard Helms was rumoured to have demanded Boutros-Ghali's removal as UN Secretary General in return for supporting the confirmation of UN Ambassador Madeleine Albright as US Secretary of State. Foa's work at the UNHCR had caught the eye of Secretary-General Boutros Boutros-Ghali. Officials and diplomats assigned to the UN said that Boutros-Ghali wanted to give the organisation a bold new face and image, particularly in the United States, to overcome the bad publicity it faced from failed or ineffective interventions in Somalia, the Balkans and Rwanda. Others say the Secretary-General saw Ms. Foa as a valuable personal asset in a year in which he would be seeking a second term. "He thought she could do for him what she had done for Mrs. Ogata [the High Commissioner for Refugees]," one European diplomat said.

In July 1996, James Rubin, Albright's spokesperson at the United States Mission to the United Nations, threatened to investigate and take action against any UN employee found to be campaigning for Boutros-Ghali's re-election with UN funds. Foa accused the Clinton administration of resorting to bully tactics akin to McCarthyism. She offered herself as the first target of the investigation "because I think he is doing a great job."

Foa, aware that Washington was determined to veto Boutros-Ghali for a second term, had made a symbolic statement about its unwillingness to pay dues. She carried a blue beret, like the ones worn by UN Peacekeeping forces around the world, to her daily briefing. Symbolically, she took off her hat to nations that did pay. Once, she had an intern arrive, dressed as an alien from outer space, to pay the dues of his planet. She encouraged Americans to send $4.40, the share of each American, to finance the UN, and people responded with tens of thousands of dollars in donations.

Boutros-Ghali ran unopposed for a second term and received the support of 14 of the 15 members of the United Nations Security Council. However, the United States vetoed his re-selection and eventually forced him to withdraw his candidacy. Kofi Annan of Ghana was selected Secretary-General for a term beginning 1 January 1997, marking the only time a sitting Secretary-General was denied a second time.

=== Later years ===
At the end of Boutros-Ghali's term, Foa moved to Israel to live with her long-time partner, businessman Shmuel Dankner. For several years she wrote a popular column, "Letter from Israel", for The Village Voice. She occasionally undertakes missions for the United Nations or NGOs in Liberia and Uganda and teaches a course at local universities entitled "So, You Want To Change the World?"

== Awards and nominations ==
Foa was twice nominated for a Pulitzer Prize. The first was for her coverage of the assassination of Indian Prime Minister Indira Gandhi, which included a 3,000–word profile based on an interview Foa conducted shortly before the Prime Minister's murder. The second was for her coverage of the 10th anniversary of the end of the Vietnam War, including an exclusive interview with Le Duc Tho.
