= William Burke, Lord of Bealatury =

Irish noble and soldier (c.1580s–1616)

William Burke Lord of Bealatury
- Uilleag de Búrca
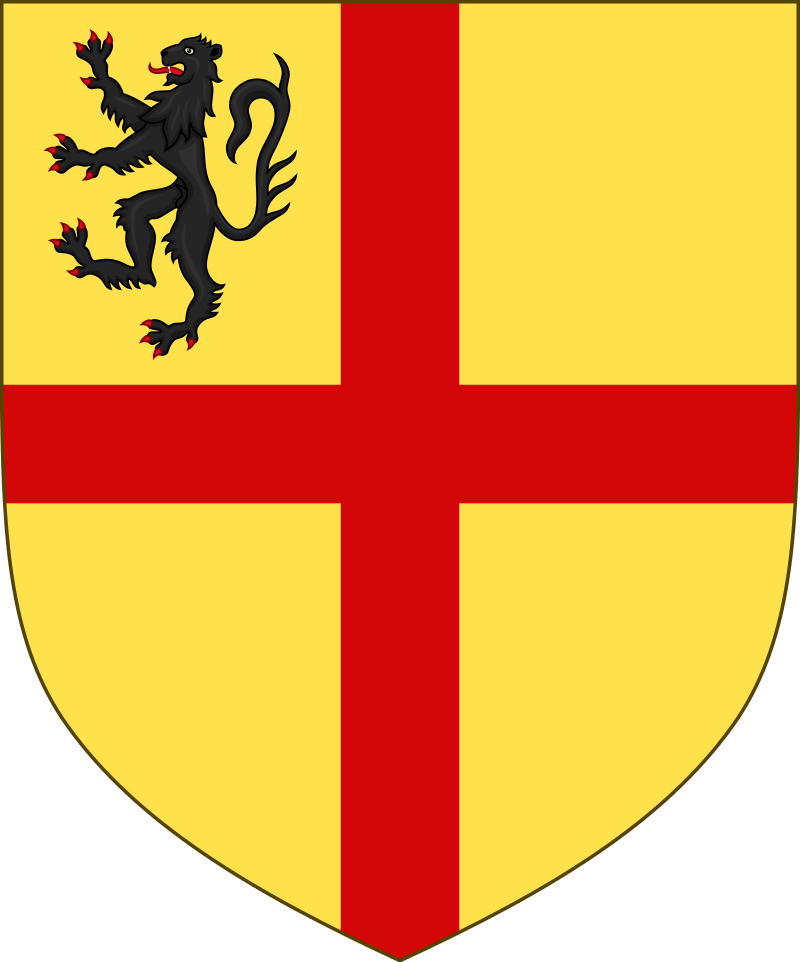
- Arms of de Burgh/Burke of Clanricarde: Or, a cross gules in the first quarter a lion rampant sable
- Parent: John na Seamar Burke
- Relatives: Redmond Burke (brother); John Óge Burke (brother); Tomás Burke (brother)
- Military career
- Service years: 1593–1603
- Conflicts: Nine Years' War; Battle of Kinsale (1601)

William Burke, Lord of Bealatury (fl. 1580s–1616) was an Irish noble and soldier who served in Spain, and later in Ireland during the Nine Years' War.

== Career ==
Burke was a member of the Burke family of Clanricarde, in what is now County Galway. He was one of five brothers who left Ireland to enrol in Spanish service in the late 1580s. The five were sons of John na Seamar Burke (died 1583) and nephews of Ulick Burke, 3rd Earl of Clanricarde (died 1601). The eldest of the family was Redmond Burke, Baron Leitrim. They were in Ireland in time to participate in the Nine Years' War (Ireland). Philip O'Sullivan Beare wrote that in 1599 Burke won a victory over "English recruits clad in red coats" (qui erant tyrones Angli sagis rubris induti).

Both William and Redmond were "some of the chiefs who were along with Red Hugh O'Donnell at Kinsale in 1601". In the aftermath of the battle it was determined that O'Donnell, "Redmond, the son of John Burke, and Captain Hugh Mus, the son of Robert, should go to Spain to complain of their distresses and difficulties to the King of Spain." O'Neill and O'Donnell determined that "These chiefs left some of their neighbouring confederates in Munster, to plunder it in their absence, namely: Captain Tyrrell, the other sons of John Burke, and other gentlemen besides them."

William accompanied Donal Cam O'Sullivan Beare on his march north in 1603. He appears to have gone to Spain in the years afterwards.

William Burke signed himself Lord of Bealatury in Spanish documents of 1616.

== See also ==
- House of Burgh, an Anglo-Norman and Hiberno-Norman dynasty founded in 1193
- Burke (surname)
- Earl of Clanricarde
- Clanricarde
- Ulick na gCeann Burke, 1st Earl of Clanricarde
