= First office application =

In telecommunication, First Office Application (FOA) is a phase in development of new equipment or technology. The FOA phase is the first deployment (pilot) of the equipment or technology in an actual customer environment after internal test and acceptance phases are completed.
