= Annali di Matematica Pura ed Applicata =

- Discipline: Mathematics
- Language: English
- Edited by: Graziano Gentili

Publication details
- Former name(s): Annali di Scienze Matematiche e Fisiche
- History: 1850–present
- Publisher: Springer Science+Business Media (Italy)
- Frequency: Bimonthly
- Open access: Hybrid
- Impact factor: 0.969 (2020)

Standard abbreviations
- ISO 4: Ann. Mat. Pura Appl.

Indexing
- CODEN: ANLMAE
- ISSN: 0373-3114 (print); 1618-1891 (web)
- LCCN: sf97001020
- OCLC no.: 47976464

Links
- Journal homepage; Online archive

The Annali di Matematica Pura ed Applicata (Annals of Pure and Applied Mathematics) is a bimonthly peer-reviewed scientific journal covering all aspects of pure and applied mathematics. The journal was established in 1850 under the title of Annali di scienze matematiche e fisiche (Annals of Mathematics and Physics), and changed to its current title in 1858: it was the first Italian periodical devoted to mathematics and written in Italian. The founding editors-in-chief were Barnaba Tortolini and Francesco Brioschi. It is currently published by Springer Science+Business Media and the editor-in-chief is Graziano Gentili (University of Florence).

== Abstracting and indexing ==
The journal is abstracted and indexed in:

- Science Citation Index Expanded
- Scopus
- Zentralblatt MATH
- Academic OneFile
- Current Contents/Physical, Chemical and Earth Sciences
- INIS Atomindex
- International Bibliography of Periodical Literature
- Mathematical Reviews
- Referativny Zhurnal

According to the Journal Citation Reports, the journal has a 2020 impact factor of 0.969.
