= Lotofoa =

Settlement in Foa island, Tonga

Coordinates: 19.742°S 174.305°W

Lotofoa is a settlement in Foa island, Tonga. It had a population of 413 in 2016.
