= Front office appearance =

Business terminology

Front Office Appearance, short FOA, is a term typically used in human resources to describe the expected look of workers who are typically the first people encountered by customers (sales, secretaries, customer service) and thus need to make a first good impression on customers. The opposite is NFOA (No Front Office Appearance).

The term is also used by some recruiters as a secret code to mark preferred attributes when reviewing and evaluating applications.
