= Faiva =

Faiva is a surname. Notable people with the surname include:

- Hame Faiva (born 1994), New Zealand-born Italian rugby union player
- James Faiva (born 1994), Tongan rugby union player
- Lusi Faiva (fl. 1997), New Zealand-Samoan stage performer
