= Franco Fortini =

Italian writer, poet and literary critic

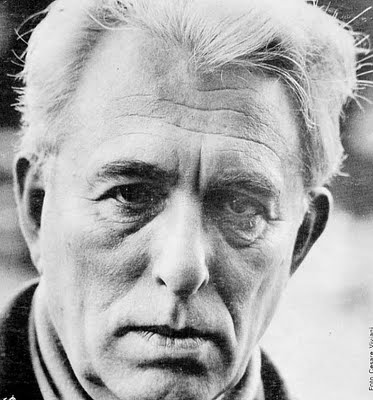

Franco Fortini was the pseudonym of Franco Lattes (10 September 1917 – 28 November 1994), an Italian poet, writer, translator, essayist, literary critic and Marxist intellectual.

== Life ==
Franco Fortini was born in Florence, the son of a Jewish lawyer, Dino Lattes, and a Catholic mother, Emma Fortini Del Giglio. He studied law and humanities at the university. In 1939 he joined the Protestant church, but in his late years he described himself as an atheist. In 1940 he adopted his mother's last name to avoid racial persecution. In 1941 he joined the Italian army as an officer. After September 8, 1943, he sought refuge in Switzerland (where he met European intellectuals, politicians and critics), then in 1944 he returned to fight with the partisans in Valdossola.

When the war was over he settled in Milan, working as journalist, copywriter and translator. He was one of the editorial board members of the magazine Il Politecnico.

Soon after the Russian invasion of Hungary in 1956, Fortini left the Italian Socialist Party which he had joined in 1944. From 1964 to 1972 he taught in secondary schools, and from 1976 occupied the Chair of Literary Criticism at the University of Siena. During this period he had considerable influence on younger generations in search of social and intellectual change. He was considered one of the most important intellectuals of the Italian New Left. He died in Milan.

He was associated with some of the most important European writers and intellectuals, such as Sartre, Brecht, Barthes and Lukács.

Fortini translated works by Goethe, Brecht, Simone Weil, Milton, Proust, Kafka, Éluard, Frénaud, Flaubert, Gide and many others.

== Bibliography (in English) ==
- Poems (parallel text, in Italian & English. Translated by Michael Hamburger) Arc Publications, Todmorden 1978. ISBN 0-902771-82-5.
- Summer is not all. Selected poems (in Italian and English. Translated by Paul Lawton), Carcanet, Manchester 1992. ISBN 0-85635-972-6.
- The Dogs of the Sinai (Translated by Alberto Toscana), Seagull Books, London 2013. ISBN 978-0857421722.
- A Test of Powers: Writings on Criticism and Literary Institutions (Translated by Alberto Toscano), Seagull Books, London 2016. ISBN 978-0-8574-2-335-1.

== Bibliography (in Italian) ==
- Fogli di via e altri versi (Marching Orders and other poems), Einaudi, Torino, 1946.
- Agonia di Natale (Christmas agony), Einaudi, Torino, 1948.
- Sei poesie per Ruth e una per me, tipografia Lucini, Milano, 1953.
- Una facile allegoria (A simple allegory), Edizioni della Meridiana, Milano, 1954.
- In una strada di Firenze (On a Florentine street), Edizioni Linea grafiche, Milano, 1955.
- Asia maggiore. Viaggio nella Cina (Asia major. A journey in China), Einaudi, Torino, 1956.
- I destini generali (General destinies), S. Sciascia, Caltanissetta-Roma, 1956.
- Dieci inverni (1947–1957) Contributi ad un discorso socialista (Ten winters 1947–1957. Contributions to a socialist discours), Feltrinelli, Milano, 1957.
- Sestina a Firenze, Schwarz, Milano, 1959.
- Il movimento surrealista (The surrealist movement), Garzanti, Milano, 1959.
- Poesia e errore (Poetry and error), Mondadori, Milano, 1969.
- Poesia delle rose (The poems of the roses), Libreria Antiquaria Palmaverde, Bologna, 1962.
- Sere in Valdossola (Evenings in Valdossola), Mondadori, Milano, 1963.
- Tre testi per film (Three texts for films), Edizioni Avanti!, Milano, 1963.
- Una volta per sempre (Once and for all), Mondadori, Milano, 1963.
- Profezie e realtà del nostro secolo. Testi e documenti per la storia di domani (Prophecies and realities of our century. Texts and documents for tomorrow's history), Laterza, Bari, 1965.
- Verifica dei poteri. Scritti di critica e di istituzioni letterarie (Verifications of the powers), Il Saggiatore, Milano, 1965.
- L'ospite ingrato. Testi e note per versi ironici (The ungrateful guest. Texts and notes towards ironic verse), De Donato, Bari, 1966.
- I cani del Sinai (The dogs of Sinai), De Donato, Bari, 1967.
- Ventiquattro voci per un dizionario di lettere. Breve guida a un buon uso dell'alfabeto (Twenty-four entries for a dictionary of letters), Il Saggiatore, Milano, 1968.
- Ventiquattro poesie 1961–1968 (Twenty-four poems 1961–1968), S.I.E. (1969).
- Questo muro (This wall), Mondadori, Milano, 1973.
- Saggi italiani (Italian essays), De Donato, Bari, 1974.
- La poesia di Scotellaro (Scotellaro's poetry), Basilicata, Roma, 1974.
- Poesie scelte (1938–1973) (Selected poems) ed. Pier Vincenzo Mangaldo, Oscar Mondadori, Milano, 1974.
- I poeti del Novecento (The poets of Twentieth century), Laterza, Bari, 1977.
- Questioni di frontiera. Scritti di politica e di letteratura 1965– 1977 (Lines of demarcation), Einaudi, Torino, 1977.
- Una volta per sempre (Foglio di via – Poesia e errore – Una volta per sempre – Questo muro) Poesie 1938–1973, Einaudi, Torino, 1978.
- Una obbedienza (An obedience), introd. by Andrea Zanzotto, S.Marco dei Giustiniani, Genova, 1980.
- Il ladro di ciliegie e altre versioni di poesia, Einaudi, Torino, 1982.
- Memorie per dopodomani. Tre scritti 1945 1967 e 1980(Memories for beyond tomorrow), ed. Carlo Fini, Quaderni di Barbablù, Siena, 1984.
- Paesaggio con serpente. Versi 19783-1983 (Landscape with serpent), Einaudi, Torino, 1984.
- Inesistenze.Cinquanta scritti 1976–1984 (Insistences), Garzanti, Milano, 1985.
- Dei confini della poesia (On the boundaries of poetry), Edizioni l'Obliquo, Brescia, 1986.
- La poesia ad alta voce (Poetry out loud), ed. Carlo Fini, Taccuini di Barbablù, Siena, 1986.
- Note su Giacomo Noventa (Notes on Giacomo Noventa), Marsilio, Venezia, 1986.
- Nuovi Saggi italiani 2 (New Italian essays 2), Garzanti, Milano, 1987.
- Versi primi e distanti 1937–1957, All'insegna del pesce d'oro, Milano, 1987.
- La cena delle ceneri & Racconto fiorentino (Ash-Wednesday supper & Florentine story), pref. by Mario Spinella, Claudio Lombardi Editore, Milano, 1988.
- La morte del cherubino. Racconto 1938, ed. Carlo Fini, Taccuini di Barbablù, Siena, 1988.
- Extrema ratio. Note per un buon uso delle rovine (Extreme reason. Notes for a good use of the ruins), Garzanti, Milano, 1990.
- Versi scelti 1939–1989 (Selected verse 1939–1989), Einaudi, Torino, 1990.
- Diario tedesco 1949 (Germany diary), Piero Manni, Lecce, 1991.
- Non solo oggi. Cinquantanove voci (Not just today), ed. Paolo Jachia, Editori Riuniti, Roma, 1991.
- Attraverso Pasolini (Through Pasolini), Einaudi, Torino, 1993.
- Composita solvantur (Loose works), Einaudi, Torino, 1994.

== Posthumous ==
- Poesie inedite (Unpublished poems), ed. P.V. Mengaldo, Einaudi, Torino, 1995.
- Trentasei moderni. Breve secondo Novecento, pref. by Romano Luperini, Manni, Lecce, 1996.
- Disobbedienze 1. Gli anni della sconfitta. Scritti sul Manifesto 1985–1994, pref. by Rossanna Rossanda, manifestolibri, Roma, 1997.
- Dialoghi con Tasso, ed. Pier Vincenzo Mengaldo and Donatello Santarone, Bollati Boringhieri, Torino, 1998.
- Dissobedienze II. Gli anni dei movimenti. Scritti sul Manifesto 1972–1985, manifestolibri, Roma, 1988.
- Franchi dialoghi, F. Fortini – F. Loi, Manni, Lecce, 1998.
- Il dolore della verità: Maggiani incontra Fortini, ed. Erminio Risso, Manni, Lecce, 2000.
- Le rose dell'abisso, ed. Donatello Santarone, Bollati Boringhieri, Torino, 2000.
- Disegni Incisioni Dipinti. Catalogo ragionato della produzione pittorica e grafica di Franco Fortini, ed. Enrico Crispolti, Quodlibet, Macerata, 2001.
- I cani del Sinai, Quodlibet, Macerata, 2002.
- Saggi ed epigrammi, ed. Luca Lenzini pref. by Rossana Rossanda, Mondadori, Milano, 2003.
- Un dialogo ininterrotto. Interviste 1952–1994, ed. Velio Abati, Bollati Boringhieri, Torino, 2003.
- Un giorno o l'altro, Quodlibet, Macerata, 2006.
- La guerra a Milano. Estate 1943. Edizione critica e commento a cura di Alessandro La Monica, Pisa, Pacini Editore, 2017.

== Secondary literature (in English) ==
- Peterson, Thomas E. (1997). The ethical muse of Franco Fortini. Gainesville: University Press of Florida. ISBN 0-8130-1479-4.
- Passannanti, E. (2004), "Poem of the Roses. Linguistic Expressionism in the Poetry of Franco Fortini", Troubador, Series Transference, Leicester, ISBN 9781904744658

== Secondary literature (in Italian) ==
- A Berardinelli, Franco Fortini, La Nuova Italia, Firenze, 1973.
- P. Sabbatino, Gli inverni di Fortini. Il rischio dell'errore nella cultura e nella poesia, Bastogni, Foggia, 1982.
- R. Luperini, La lotta mentale. Per un profilo di Franco Fortini. Editori Riuniti, Roma, 1986.
- R. Pagnanelli, Fortini, Transeuropa, Ancona, 1988
- Paolo Jachia – Luca Lenzini – Pia Mondelli (a c. di), Bibliografia degli scritti di Franco Fortini (1935–1991), Firenze, Le Monnier, 1989.
- T.E. Peterson, The Ethical Muse of Franco Fortini, University Press of Florida, Gainesville, 1997.
- L. Lenzini, Il poeta di nome Fortini. Saggi e proposte di lettura, Manni, Lecce, 1999.
- Elisabetta Nencini, "L'Archivio Franco Fortini della Facoltà di Lettere dell'Università di Siena", in Raffaella Castagnola (a c. di), Archivi letterari del '900, Firenze, Franco Cesati, 2000, pp. 13–116.
- E. Passannanti (a cura di), "Realtà e paradosso della traduzione poetica, Istituto di Studi Filosofici, 2004.
- E. Passannanti, Scrittura saggistica, linguaggio lirico e traduzione poetica nell'opera di Franco Fortini (Tesi di PhD), Brindin Press, Salisbury, 2004.
- E. Passannanti, Poem of the Roses. Linguistic Expressionism in the Poetry of Franco Fortini, Series Transference, Troubador, Leicester, 2004.
- D. Balicco, Non parlo a tutti. Franco Fortini intellettuale e politico, Manifestolibri, Roma, 2006.
- D. Dalmas, La protesta di Fortini, Stylos, Aosta, 2006.
- E. Passannanti, "Senso e semiotica in Paesaggio con serpente di Franco Fortini", Brindin Press, Salisbury, 2011.
- Luca Lenzini, Elisabetta Nencini, Felice Rappazzo, Dieci inverni senza Fortini. Poeti e critici a confronto, Siena 14–16 ottobre 2004, Atti delle giornate di studio nel decennale della scomparsa, Quodlibet 2006.Con contributi di Giuseppe Nava, Mario Luzi, Franco Loi, Andrea Zanzotto, Jean-Charles Vegliante, Stefano Dal Bianco, Massimo Raffaeli, Gianni D'Elia, Pietro Cataldi, Andrea Inglese, Davide Dalmas, Thomas Peterson, Giovanni La Guardia Ausgrenzung, Guido Mazzoni, Mario Benedetti, Emanuele Zinato, Valentina Tinacci, Giacomo Magrini, Andrea Cortellessa, Gabriele Frasca, Riccardo Bonavita, Cristina Alziati, Erminia Passannanti, Fabrizio Podda, Enrica Zanin, Giovanni Solinas.
- E. Passannanti, Commentario a Realtà e paradosso della traduzione poetica di Franco Fortini. Excursus sulle teorie della traduzione del testo poetico, Brindin Press, 2004, sec, ed. 2008.
- E. Passannanti, La partenza. Saggio di analisi testuale, Premio Franco Fortini per la Saggistica, Sondrio: CFR Edizioni, 2011.
- L. Tommasini, Educazione e utopia: Franco Fortini docente a scuola e all'università, Quodlibet, 2023.
