= ʻAtenisi Institute =

ʻAtenisi Institute is located in the Kingdom of Tonga and comprises ʻAtenisi University and the ʻAtenisi Foundation for the Performing Arts. ʻAtenisi in Tongan means Athens, the capital of Greece. The institute, founded by Futa Helu (1934–2010), began as a continuing education programme for civil servants, then initiated a high school in 1964 (now independently operated by ACTS Community Schools) and a university in 1975.

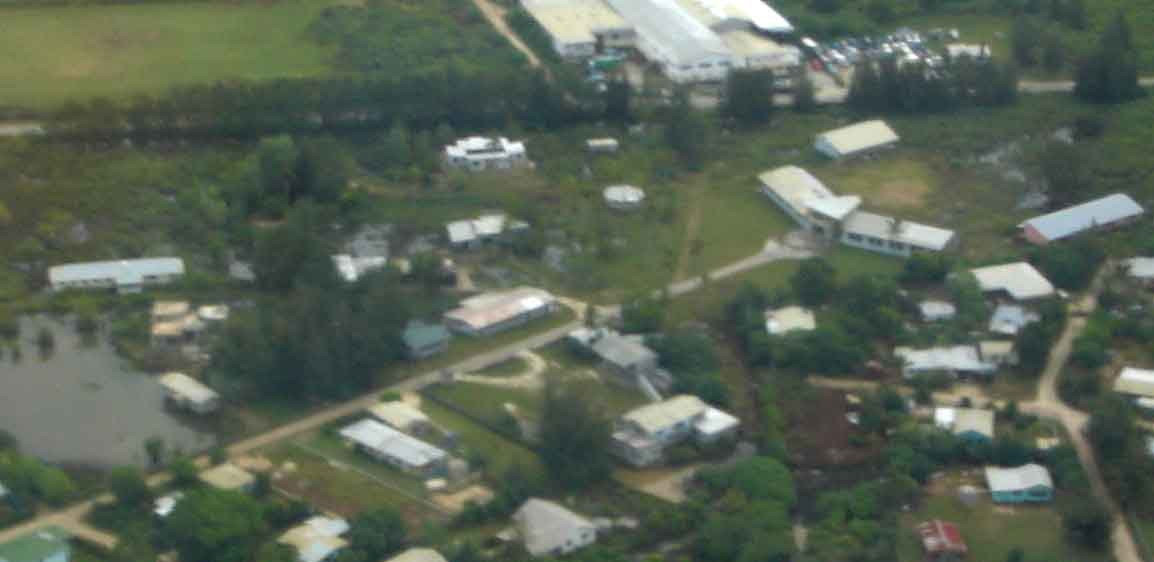
Aerial photo of the institute and surroundings

ʻAtenisi Institute was initially a downtown night school providing continuing education for civil servants, evolving into a secondary daytime school in 1964. In 1966, Helu registered ʻAtenisi's high school with the government and at the end of that year leased a 6.5-hectare (16-acre) parcel in Tufuenga, a western district in the Tongan capital of Nuku'alofa. The parcel is, in fact, below sea level and students often speak of the swampus instead of the campus. At the end of 1975, a small university joined the high school on the site, its first Bachelor of Arts degrees being awarded in 1980, followed a few years later by bachelor of science degrees. By the 1990s, some Master of Arts degrees – and even a doctorate degree – were awarded in collaboration with universities in Australia and New Zealand.

== ʻAtenisi High School ==
In the 1960s, there were not many high schools in Tonga, and the few that there were catered to either an economic or academic elite. To fill the gap, ʻAtenisi's high school assumed a populist stance, offering inexpensive and innovative education. Yet academic standards were high; for example, whereas other schools settled for the modest New Zealand syllabus, ʻAtenisi chose the more challenging syllabus of New South Wales, Australia.

The 1970s and 1980s, were the high school's heyday, at one point attracting some 800 students; however, enrollment began to fall in the 1990s in the face of competition from more than a dozen high schools established by the government or religious organizations. By 2005, school fees were no longer sufficient to cover costs. The school was forced to close in 2006, but reopened in 2007 before closing permanently at the end of 2009.

== ʻAtenisi Foundation for the Performing Arts ==
Since the late 1980s, the ʻAtenisi Foundation for the Performing Arts (AFPA) has been a component of the institute, with a mission to preserve the music and dance of traditional Tongan culture, as well as train musicians in European classical music. The Foundation is widely regarded in Tonga as a national treasure. Its star soprano, 'Atolomake Helu, has performed at Sydney and Auckland Town Halls. For a time, AFPA regularly toured overseas, performing European classical and operatic excerpts along with traditional Tongan faiva.

== University at ʻAtenisi Institute ==
The university at 'Atenisi Institute was established seven years after the University of the South Pacific opened its Tongan campus. Nevertheless, the school was unique in being the only privately funded university in the South Pacific islands, and therefore autonomous from any church or government. This was both an advantage and a disadvantage. The advantage was that the university could freely train critical thought, rather than compel students to conform to bureaucratic obedience or religious dogma. The disadvantage was that the university rarely received funding from either of the aforementioned sources, which usually condemned it to an austere budget solely supported by modest tuition fees.

Because the university regarded method of thought to be its pedagogical priority, philosophy was considered its most important course; facility with the English language and appreciation of English literature was a second key objective. In addition, the university offered core courses in the natural sciences, social sciences, arts, and humanities. Because of its reputation for rigour, most ʻAtenisi University students found it relatively easy to obtain scholarships to graduate schools in New Zealand, Australia, and the United States.

== Retrenchment and Renovation ==
In the early years of the university, its emphasis on philosophy was popular with Tonga's independent farmers: their sons might return to their modest plantations and display classical learning at weekend faikava (traditional kava circles). Yet with growing pressure for vocational success among Tonga's urban middle class, only the most talented students remain attracted to ʻAtenisi's classical credo. This has led to a decline in enrollment which, in the face of increasingly more viable tertiary training in Tonga and overseas, limits the small university that Futa Helu built.

Presumably suffering from Alzheimer's disease, Futa Helu retired in 2007 as institute director and dean of its university. Since 2008, there has been considerable turnover in administration. At first, his daughter Sisiʻuno assumed the post of institute director in 2008, followed by his son Niulala in 2009, with Sisiʻuno returning in 2010. University management experienced turnover as well, with Michael Horowitz taking over as dean from 2008 to 2010, followed by Marilyn Dudley-Flores in 2011–2012. ʻOpeti Taliai, a Tongan anthropologist who holds a PhD from Massey University as well as an ʻAtenisi undergraduate degree, served as dean from 2013 to 2014; he had previously taught linguistics at the institute. But after regionally promoting an acclaimed novella published in New Zealand, Horowitz returned in 2015 as dean.

There has been incremental renovation of the campus since Helu's death in February 2010. Three dilapidated buildings – a science laboratory, print shop, and office cottage – have been removed, with the laboratory being replaced by a compact module erected by Group Construction that has, however, not yet been equipped for laboratory instruction. By September 2014, the former university library had been abandoned and its collection moved to a building on the campus quadrangle.

With the accession of the Democracy Party in 2015, 'Atenisi's relationship with the Tongan government improved markedly. In August the university was promptly awarded a two-year extension of its registration, whilst New Zealand Aid is currently considering extending tuition assistance to its undergraduates. In September 2015, Finance Minister 'Aisake Eke delivered the featured address at the university's 40th anniversary, saluting 'Atenisi's's signature methodology of critical thinking.

== Documentary film ==
In August 2012, a film on Futa Helu's life and the history of ʻAtenisi was screened at the New Zealand International Film Festival, garnering favourable reviews in the New Zealand Herald and Overland. The documentary, Tongan Ark, was created, directed, and photographed by Paul Janman, a Welsh-Kiwi anthropologist and former ʻAtenisi instructor. Tongan Ark went on to play at several U.S. and European film festivals and in 2013 was screened on New Zealand's Rialto Channel as part of a showcase of New Zealand cinema.

== See also ==
- Category:Academic staff of ʻAtenisi Institute
