= Foa =

Island in Tonga

Coordinates: 19°45′S 174°18′W

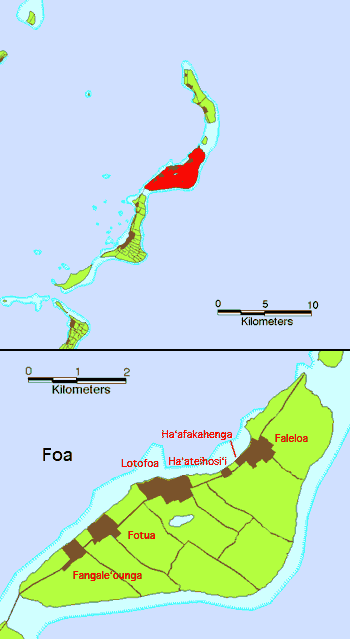
Foa

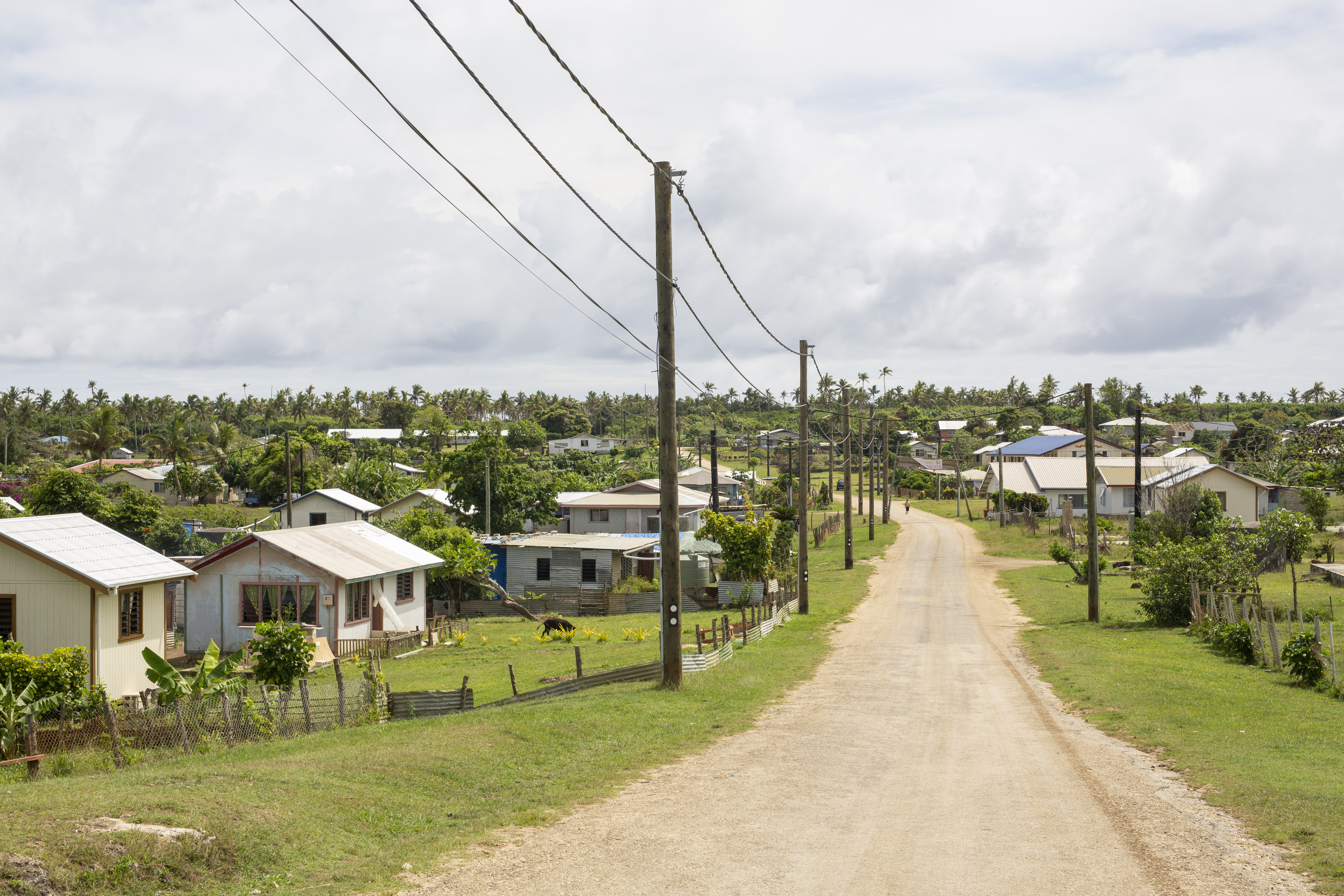
Faleloa, Foa Island

Foa is an island in Tonga. It is located within the Haʻapai group in the centre of the country, to northeast of the national capital of Nukuʻalofa.

Foa is linked to adjacent Lifuka Island by a causeway, and is located 640 metres northeast of Lifuka.

The island has an area of 13.39 km^{2} (5.17 sq mi). The population as of the 2016 census was 1,392.

== History ==
Ancient petroglyphs on the northern end of Foa show evidence that the island has been inhabited by native tribes for hundreds of years, but since then they have been exposed by beach erosion. In 2012, the wreck of the pirate ship Port-au-Prince was discovered off the coast of the island.

== Settlements ==
- Faleloa
- Fangaleʻounga
- Fotua
- Lotofoa

== See also ==
- List of cities in Tonga
