= Piergiorgio Bellocchio =

Italian writer (1931–2022)

- Born: 15 December 1931; Piacenza, Italy
- Died: 18 April 2022 (aged 90); Piacenza, Italy
- Occupation: Writer

Piergiorgio Bellocchio (15 December 1931 – 18 April 2022) was an Italian writer, literary critic and journalist.

== Life and career ==
The brother of the film director Marco, Bellocchio became first known as the founder and editor of the left-wing anti-Marxist political magazine Quaderni piacentini (Italian: "Piacenza Notebooks", 1962-1984). After the closure of Quaderni he founded and directed the magazine Diario (1985-1993). He was the first editor-in-chief of the far-left Lotta Continua newspaper, and he also collaborated as a columnist with other publications including Panorama and L'Unità.

Bellocchio published books with Mondadori, Rizzoli, Einaudi, Baldini Castoldi Dalai Editore, and directed the publishing house Gulliver. His style has been described as "a mixture of satire, aphorisms and glimpses of narrative and reality, expressed in an always very clear writing".
