= Il Politecnico =

Literary and cultural magazine in Milan, Italy (1945–1947)

- Editor: Elio Vittorini
- Categories: Literary magazine; Cultural magazine
- Frequency: Weekly (September 1945-May 1946); Monthly (May 1946-December 1947)
- Founder: Elio Vittorini
- Founded: 1945
- First issue: 29 September 1945
- Final issue Number: December 1947; 39
- Country: Italy
- Based in: Milan
- Language: Italian
- OCLC: 654801459

Il Politecnico (Italian: The Polytechnic) was a Communist cultural and literary magazine published in Milan, Italy, between 1945 and 1947. In the debut editorial it was stated that the magazine was inspired by the homonymous journal which had been founded by Carlo Cattaneo in 1839 and published until 1845. Although it was a short-lived publication, Il Politecnico was the most prominent magazine in Italy during its run.

== History and profile ==
Il Politecnico was first published in Milan as a weekly on 29 September 1945. The magazine was openly affiliated with the Communist Party. Giulio Einaudi was the publisher, and Elio Vittorini was the editor of the magazine. Franco Fortini, an Italian poet and Marxist theorist, was one of the editorial board members of Il Politecnico. From 1 May 1946 the magazine came out monthly.

The idea behind the establishment of Il Politecnico was to rebuild Italian culture after the experience of Fascism. This idea was originally developed by a communist Catholic philosopher Felice Balbo in 1945. Il Politecnico also aimed at providing a democratic forum for literary discussions. It considered culture as a guide to policy. This approach was similar to that advocated by French thinker Jean-Paul Sartre and was totally opposite of Palmiro Togliatti's understanding of culture as something less important than party instructions.

Il Politecnico rejected not to cover the work by non-Communist artists and featured translations of famous authors such as Ernest Hemingway, T. S. Eliot, Franz Kafka and James Joyce. Translated literary work by these and other international authors was one of the defining characteristics of the magazine. It also published photo-stories of Luigi Crocenzi. Italo Calvino was among the contributors and in fact, he started his career as a journalist in the magazine.

Due to the conflict between the Communist Party leader Palmiro Togliatti and Elio Vittorini and its editorial policy Il Politecnico lost the support of the Communist Party. The magazine eventually ceased publication in December 1947. The 39th issue was the last one which did not announce the closing of the magazine.

== See also ==
- List of magazines in Italy
