= Ata =

ATA or Ata may refer to:

== Computing ==
- AT Attachment (ATA/ATAPI), the old name of Parallel ATA, an older interface for computer storage devices
- Analog telephone adapter, a device for connecting analog telephones to a Voice-over-IP system

== Education ==
- Ashcroft Technology Academy, Wandsworth, London, England
- Advanced Technologies Academy, a high school in Las Vegas, Nevada, USA
- Asia Theological Association
- Alberta Teachers' Association, Canada
- Automotive Technician Accreditation, scheme in the UK for vehicle mechanics
- University of Technology and Arts in Applied Sciences (Akademia Techniczno-Artystyczna Nauk Stosowanych, ATA), university in Warsaw, Poland

== Science, technology, and medicine ==
- Anti-transglutaminase antibodies, in certain autoimmune diseases
- Anti-topoisomerase antibodies
- Anti-thyroglobulin antibodies
- Allen Telescope Array
- Atmosphere absolute, a variant of the standard atmosphere (unit)
- American Telemedicine Association
- American Thyroid Association
- ATA chapter numbers
- Alternating timed automaton
- ATA, a codon for the amino acid isoleucine

== Sports ==
- American Taekwondo Association
- American Tennis Association
- Amateur Trapshooting Association
- Archery Trade Association
- A.T.A. (Greenland)

== Organizations ==
- Africa Travel Association
- Air Transport Auxiliary
- Airlift/Tanker Association
- Albanian Telegraphic Agency
- American Topical Association, a philatelic organization
- American Tinnitus Association
- American Translators Association
- Association of Talent Agents, Los Angeles, US
- Associazione Traffico e Ambiente, a transport association in Switzerland
- Atlantic Treaty Association
- Aberri Ta Askatasuna, the original name of the Basque organization ETA
- Artists' Television Access microcinema, San Francisco, US

== Places ==
- Antarctica's ISO 3166-1 alpha-3 country code
- Áta, a village in Hungary
- Ața, a river in Romania
- ʻAta, Tonga, a depopulated island
- ʻAtā, Tonga, an island used as an open prison
- Ata Caldera, a submerged volcanic caldera in Japan

== Transportation ==
- ATA Airlines, an American airline operating from 1973 to 2008
  - ATA Holdings, owner of ATA Airlines
- ATA Airlines (Iran), Tabriz
- ATA Cruiser, a 1920s aircraft
- Air Transport Association of America, later Airlines for America
- Air Transport Auxiliary of the UK RAF
- American Trucking Associations
- ATA Carnet, a customs document
- Comandante FAP Germán Arias Graziani Airport, Anta, Peru, IATA code
- Hall-Miller Municipal Airport, Atlanta, Cass County, Texas, US, FAA location identifier
- Station code for Alastua railway station
- A US Navy hull classification symbol: Auxiliary ocean tug (ATA)

== Other uses ==
- Ata (name), people with the first name or family name
- Ata language (disambiguation)
- Ata Gears, a transmission part producer
- Atacama skeleton, skeletal remains of a human that were found during 2003 in a deserted Chilean town

== See also ==
- AATA (disambiguation)
