= Administrative divisions of Tonga =

Administrative subdivisions of Tonga

The island country of Tonga has five administrative divisions. Each of these is further divided into districts, 23 in total. Below are several lists of the divisions, according to different sorting schemes. The Niua Islands is managed directly from Nukuʻalofa, since the population is under 1500 people.

== Administrative subdivisions ==
Name	Notes	Capital	Area (km^{2})	Inhabited Islands Area (km^{2})	Population (2016 Census)	Density (inhabitants/km^{2})
Tongatapu	part of the Tongatapu Group	Nukuʻalofa	275.5	272	74,611	274
Vavaʻu		Neiafu	161	131.3	13,738	92.7
Haʻapai		Pangai	132.11	114.2	6,125	50.2
ʻEua	part of the Tongatapu Group	ʻOhonua	88.3	88	4,945	56.8
Ongo Niua	managed directly from Nukuʻalofa	Hihifo	72	71.9	1,232	17.8
Tonga		Nukuʻalofa	728.8	677.4	100,651	142.1

== By Districts ==
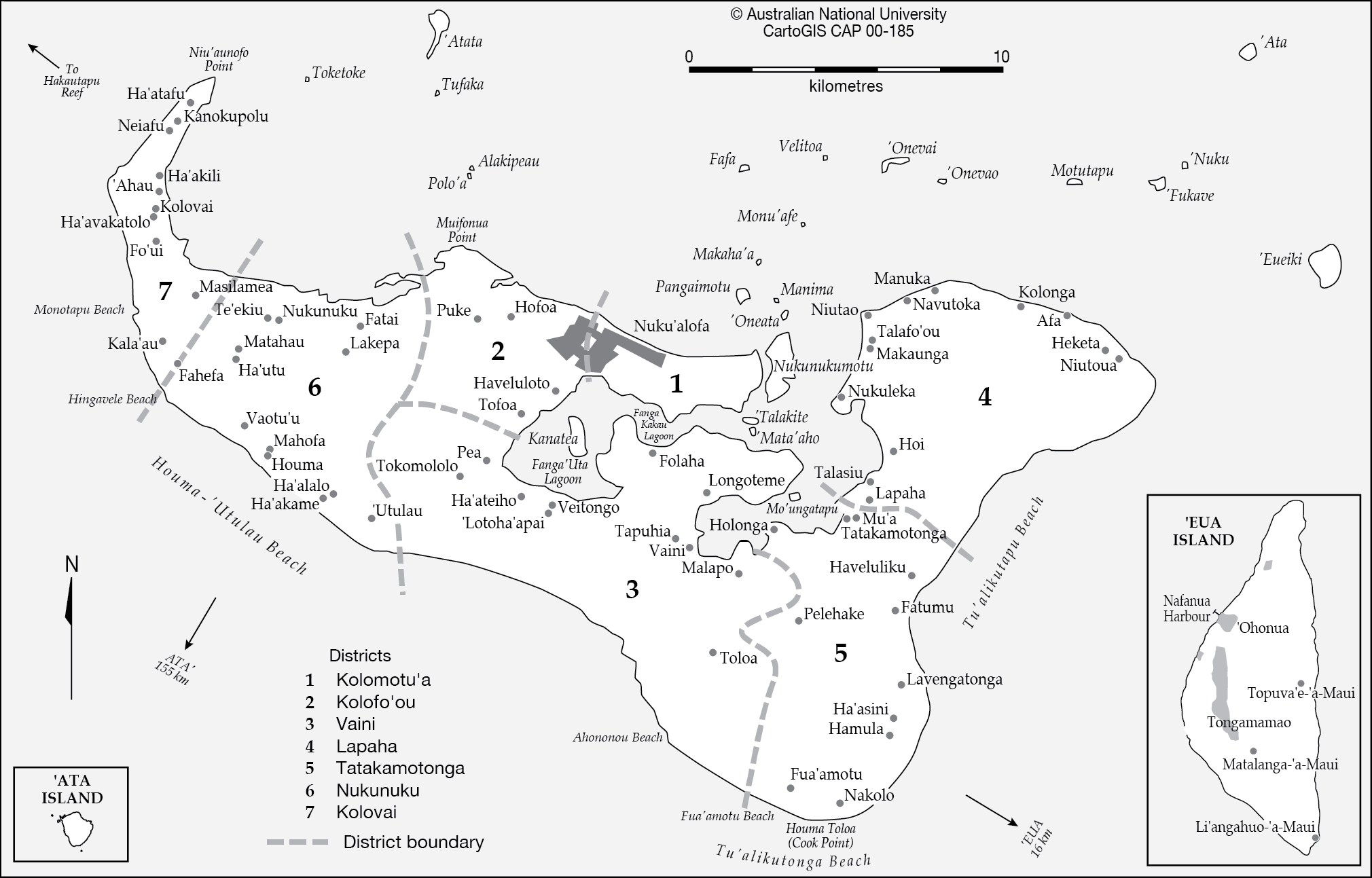
The seven districts of Tongatapu

Name	Subdivision	ISO 3166-2:TO code	Notes	Capital	Area (km^{2})	Population	Density (inhabitants/km^{2})
Kolofoʻou	Tongatapu	TO-041		West Nukuʻalofa	0.00	18,960	0.0
Kolomotuʻa	Tongatapu	TO-042		East Nukuʻalofa	0.00	17,100	0.0
Vaini	Tongatapu	TO-043		Vaini	0.00	12,950	0.0
Tatakamotonga	Tongatapu	TO-044		Tatakamotonga	0.00	7,230	0.0
Lapaha	Tongatapu	TO-045		Lapaha	0.00	7,380	0.0
Nukunuku	Tongatapu	TO-046		Nukunuku	0.00	7,730	0.0
Kolovai	Tongatapu	TO-047		Kolovai	0.00	4,080	0.0
Neiafu	Vavaʻu	TO-051	with Ofu and surrounding islands	Neiafu	24.0	5,780	0.0
Pangaimotu	Vavaʻu	TO-052		Pangaimotu	10.979	1,325	0.0
Hahake	Vavaʻu	TO-053	east Vavaʻu	Taʻanea	30.00	2,300	0.0
Leimatuʻa	Vavaʻu	TO-054		Leimatuʻa	21.00	2,436	0.0
Hihifo	Vavaʻu	TO-055	west Vavaʻu	Longomapu	30.00	2,105	0.0
Motu	Vavaʻu	TO-056	Vavaʻu south islands	Hunga	45.167	985	0.0
Lifuka	Haʻapai	TO-021		Pangai	14.66	2,420	0.0
Foa	Haʻapai	TO-022		Lotofoa	13.903	1,360	0.0
Lulunga	Haʻapai	TO-023		Haʻafeva	73.85	1,057	0.0
Muʻomuʻa	Haʻapai	TO-024		Nomuka	11.26	609	0.0
Haʻano	Haʻapai	TO-024		Fakakai	9.0	511	0.0
ʻUiha	Haʻapai	TO-026		ʻUiha	8.4	672	0.0
ʻEua Motuʻa	ʻEua	TO-011	ʻEua North	ʻOhonua	44.50	2,852	0.0
ʻEua Foʻou	ʻEua	TO-012	ʻEua South	Angaha	44.50	2,164	0.0
Niua Toputapu	Ongo Niua	TO-031		Hihifo	20.00	760	38.0
Niua Foʻou	Ongo Niua	TO-032		ʻEsia	52.00	523	10.0
Tonga				Nukuʻalofa	728.8	103,500	142.1

=== Notes ===
Minerva Reefs is generally considered to be a part of Tonga. It has never formed part of any administrative subdivision or district of Tonga.

=== Area stats ===
The districts of Tonga have the following statistical info: the average size of a district is 31.7 km^{2}, while the median area is 0.0 km^{2}. the size of these districts is predominantly dependent on the land area of the islands they occupy.

=== Population stats ===
The districts of Tonga have the following statistical info: The average district population is 4,500, while the median is 0.

According to official data from the 2011 Tonga we had over 20 cities with a population in excess of 200 inhabitants. The country's capital Nukuʻalofa is the only city had a population of over 20000 residents; 2 city with a population of 1 ÷ 5 thousand. and the rest of the cities of less than 1000. residents.

Sources :

- Tonga Data 1
- Tonga Data 2
- Tonga Data 3
- Tonga Data 4
- Daily Telegraph Tongan island for sale

== See also ==
- ISO 3166-2:TO
- List of cities in Tonga
