= Friends of Tonga =

American nonprofit

- Formation: 2018
- Legal status: 501(c)(3)
- Headquarters: Laurel, Maryland, United States
- Website: https://friendsoftonga.org/

Friends of Tonga is a 501(c)(3) tax-exempt nonprofit organization registered in the United States. It is affiliated with the National Peace Corps Association, but membership is open to anyone with connections to Tonga.

== History ==
Friends of Tonga was founded in 2018 by returned Peace Corps volunteers in response to the impacts of Cyclone Gita, primarily focusing on disaster risk management and recovery efforts. It soon expanded into educational projects, including a scholarship program, a video resource library, and a pen pal program.

In July 2021, Friends of Tonga completed the reconstruction of a kindergarten in Ta'anga which had been destroyed by Cyclone Gita. Prior to the reconstruction, students had been learning inside a donated UNICEF tent.

Friends of Tonga distributed aid in the aftermath of the 2022 Hunga Tonga–Hunga Haʻapai eruption and tsunami. Former All Blacks player Charles Piutau and various rugby clubs in the United Kingdom contributed TOP$136,000 to the organization to support the relief effort.

In May 2025, Friends of Tonga partnered with the Tonga Ministry of Education and Training to develop and launch a bilingual (Tongan and English) reading app project named Tau Laukonga. It is free and available on both iOS and Android devices.
