= Kolomaile =

- Village
- Interactive map of Kolomaile
- Coordinates: 21.392°S 174.952°W
- Country: Tonga
- District: ʻEua

Population (2021)
  - Total: 486
- Time zone: UTC+13:00

Kolomaile is a village on the island of ʻEua in Tonga. It is the southernmost village on the island. Kolomaile was established by people relocated from ʻAta after their island had been depopulated by slavers, and is named after the village they left behind. For census purposes the village is combined with Haʻatuʻa, and the combined population is 486.

== See also ==
- Tongan castaways
