= Gehyra vorax =

Conservation status
- Near Threatened (IUCN 3.1)

Scientific classification
- Kingdom: Animalia
- Phylum: Chordata
- Class: Reptilia
- Order: Squamata
- Suborder: Gekkota
- Family: Gekkonidae
- Genus: Gehyra
- Species: G. vorax

Binomial name
- Gehyra vorax Girard, 1858

Species of lizard

Gehyra vorax, also known by the common names voracious four-clawed gecko and voracious dtella, is a large arboreal gecko in the family Gekkonidae native to the Southwest Pacific. It is known to be extant natively on Fiji and as an introduced species in the Society Islands of French Polynesia. There also exists 19th-century reports of the species being found on Tonga and Norfolk Island, each on the basis of a single specimen, but their provenance has been questioned, and even if accurate it has since likely been extirpated from those islands.

For most of the 20th century there existed disagreements over the taxonomic status of G. vorax, with many considering it a synonym of G. oceanica. Later studies confirmed its status as its own species, but also established that G. membranacruralis, G. marginata and G. georgpotthasti were their own species rather than synonyms of G. vorax

The natural habitat of G. vorax is dense rainforest and the upper reaches of lowland forests. It is wary of humans, who have traditionally hunted it for food, not being found in any areas that humans inhabit and tending to stay away from any habitat disturbed by human activities. The species is vulnerable to habitat loss by deforestation.

== Taxonomy ==
Gehyrax vorax was first described from a series of three syntypes by Charles Girard in 1857, with the type locality being Fiji, (Note: Given as "Fejee Islands" by Girard.) the syntypes having been collected there by the United States Exploring Expedition under Captain Charles Wilkes. One of the syntypes (USNM 5699/1) was designated as the lectotype in 2012. The specific name, vorax, is Latin, meaning 'voracious' (or 'ravenous').

The taxonomic treatment of G. vorax persisted unchallenged for 75 years, but in 1932 Charles E. Burt and May Danheim Burt stated that G. vorax "probably should be placed in the synonymy of oceanica" after having failed to distinguish which of the species specimens collected by the Whitney South Sea Expedition were part of. Burt and Burt had attempted to diagnose the G. vorax specimens by their larger size and the at the time presumed key distinguishing feature of dermal folds on the forelimbs, stating afterwards that "The examination of many specimens shows hopeless confusion in these characters"; dermal folds on the forelimbs has since ceased to be considered as a diagnostic.

The synonymization advanced by Burt and Burt became widely followed, although not all authors accepted it, and in 1992 William N. Beckon published a paper on the Pacific members of Gehyra, concluding from his examination of over 450 specimens that there was "ample justification" for distinguishing G. vorax and G. oceanica as separate species based on their morphologies. The paper also distinguished three distinct morphological groups within G. vorax, one each from Fiji, Vanuatu and New Guinea. The New Guinea group had already been separated from G. oceanica in 1989 as G. membranacruralis, which was thus synonymized with G. vorax. G. marginata, found in North Maluku, Indonesia, was also synonymized, treated provisionally as a fourth, but "poorly distinguished", morphological form.

Subsequent molecular phylogenetics studies, culminating in Flecks et al. (2012), confirmed that G. vorax and G. oceanica were separate species, but also found grounds to treat the morphological groups of G. vorax as separate taxa, returning G. marginata and G. membranacruralis from synonymy and describing the new species G. georgpotthasti from the populations in Vanuatu and the Loyalty Islands. G. marginata was found to be a sister species to G. oceanica, while G. membranacruralis and G. georgpotthasti were found to be more closely related to G. vorax.

== Description ==
Gehyra vorax is a large gecko, with a snout–vent length (SVL) ranging from about 110–155 mm (4.3–6.1 in), (Note: Studies agree on range but conflict on the average: Beckon (1992) reports 127.7 mm (5.03 in) while Flecks et al. (2012) reports 137.2 mm (5.40 in).) of which the snout makes up slightly over 10%, while the whole head comes in at 25% of the SVL in length and 20% of the SVL in width. The dorsum is brown to greyish, may have darker or lighter markings, and like with other Gehyra species is covered in granular scales that are each surrounded by six smaller scales, forming a six-point star pattern. These smaller scales are also found in close relatives, but they are most prominent in G. vorax.

The tail is rounded, has a length of about 60–70% of the SVL and can be regenerated if damaged or lost. Dermal folds can be found on the sides of the torso, and further down the brown to greyish dorsum gives way to a solid white venter and more dermal folds on the front of the forelimbs and the back of the hindlimbs. The pads underneath the digits of G. vorax have lamellae that curve smoothly across their pads, and a higher number of them than its close relatives do.

== Ecology ==
G. vorax is an arboreal species, usually found inhabiting the trees of dense rainforest and the upper reaches of lowland forests, with a preference for the higher parts of canopy. It is consistently rare throughout its entire range, being wary of human contact and staying clear of areas inhabited by humans, something that has been attributed to the fact they are traditionally hunted for food, although there are cases of them being found in disturbed forested habitats. They have also been recorded in coastal habitats, such as in mangrove forests. They confine themselves to trees more strictly in areas where they are sympatric with G. oceanica.

As a result of G. vorax arboreal nature, it is vulnerable to habitat loss, and widespread deforestation for reasons such as the logging and mining industries has led to a decline in population; the species was for this reason listed as near-threatened after its 2013 IUCN Red List assessment.

== Distribution ==
G. vorax is only know for certain to be extant in Fiji, where it is found on the main islands of Viti Levu and Vanua Levu, on Taveuni, on the Lomaiviti Island of Ovalau, Moturiki, Koro, and Gau, on the southernly Kadavu and on various islets near these islands.

In addition to the known populations in Fiji, there are 19th century reports of a single specimen from each of Tonga and Norfolk Island; however, subsequent surveys of these islands have failed to find further specimens. Modern scholarship has questioned the provenance of those reports, and, if they are accurate, consider it likely that the species has since been extirpated from those islands.

In 2009 it was reported that introduced populations of geckos were inhabiting the Society Islands of French Polynesia, and these were later found to belong to G. vorax and G. georgpotthasti.
