= Ovalau Island =

Ovalau Island may refer to

- Ovalau (Vava'u), an island in Tonga
- Ovalau (Fiji), an island in Fiji
