= Pangaimotu =

Pangaimotu may refer to two islands in Tonga:

- Pangaimotu (Vavaʻu)
- Pangaimotu (Tongatapu)
