= National parks of Tonga =

Tonga was the first South Pacific country to put a conservation programme in place with a series of national marine reserves. The country has four national parks which are administered by Forest Division, which falls under the Ministry of Environment and Climate Change.

== National parks ==
=== 'Eua National Park ===
The 'Eua National Park, located on the island of ʻEua, was established in 1992. It covers 4.51 km^{2} (2 sq mi) area on the east coast of the island. It encompasses a 800 m (2,625 ft) wide band of tropical rainforest, bordered on the west by sheer cliffs that drop down to the ocean. The coordinates of 'Eua National Park are 21.4026° S, 174.9050° W.

=== Mount Talau National Park ===
The Mount Talau National Park, located on the island of Vava’u, was established in 1995. It was named after the flat-topped mountain that rises 131 metres (430 ft) behind the Port of Refuge. Mount Talau National Park was established to preserve the local tropical rainforest. The park is home to the Lau banded iguana (Brachylophus fasciatus), as well as the Tongan whistler (Pachycephala jacquinoti) and the Insular flying fox (Pteropus tonganus).

=== Kao National Park ===
The Kao National Park, covers the island of Kao and surrounding marine environment. It was established in 2001 and has a total area of 11.47 square kilometres (4 sq mi).

=== Tofua National Park ===
The Tofua National Park, covers the island of Tofua and the surrounding marine environment. It was established in 2001 and has a total area of 53.94 square kilometres (21 sq mi). It incorporates the 8 km (5 mi) circular island, which is dominated by a 5 km (3 mi) wide caldera, containing a freshwater lake (30 m (98 ft) above sea level) and is surrounded by 300 m (984 ft) cliffs. The island is where Captain William Bligh was stranded during the Mutiny on the Bounty incident in 1789.
