= Muʻomuʻa =

- Interactive map of Muʻomuʻa
- Coordinates: 20°23′57.05″S 174°43′33.39″W
- Country: Tonga
- Division: Haʻapai
- Time zone: UTC+13 (–)
  - Summer (DST): UTC+14 (–)

Muʻomuʻa is a district of Haʻapai division, Tonga.
