= Tongan castaways =

Six boys shipwrecked on ʻAta, Tonga, in 1965

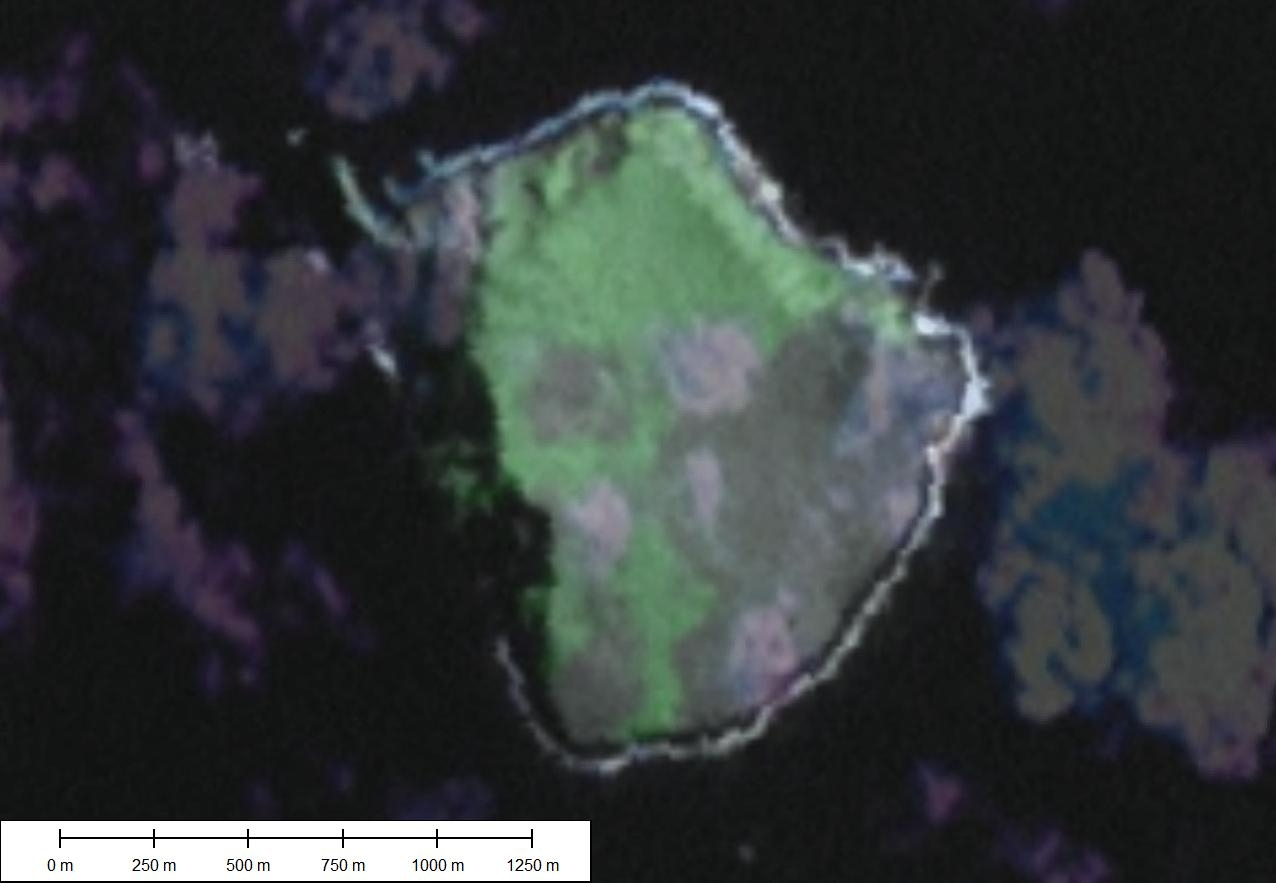
ʻAta island

The Tongan castaways were a group of six Tongan teenage boys who shipwrecked on the uninhabited island of ʻAta 160 km (99 mi) south west from Tonga in 1965 and lived there for 15 months until their rescue. The boys ran away from their boarding school on the island of Tongatapu, stealing a boat in their escape. After a storm wrecked the boat, they drifted to the abandoned, remote island of ʻAta and managed to keep themselves in good order for the duration under the circumstances. Long thought dead, they were discovered and rescued in September 1966 by Australian lobster fisher Peter Warner.

== Escape ==
The six boys, aged between 13 and 19, were Luke Veikoso, "Stephen" Tevita Fatai Latu, Sione Fataua, "David" Tevita Siolaʻa, Kolo Fekitoa, and "Mano" Sione Filipe Totau. (Note: The sources give conflicting accounts of the boys' ages. Lavin's October 1966 report, written shortly after the boys were rescued, says they were between 16 and 18. Bregman and Risen each report that the boys were between 13 and 16. Lyons gives Mano's age as 73 in May 2020, which would make him 18 or 19 during the initial events of June 1965. Morgans gives Mano's age as 74 in March 2021, and reports that Mano was 19 during his time on the island.) (Note: Morgans and Lyons each report that "Mano" is Sione Filipe Totau. Risen also reports that Sione Filipe Totau was known as "Mano," and that Tevita Fatai Latu went by "Stephen." By process of elimination, Bregman's "David" is Tevita Siolaʻa.) In June 1965, the boys ran away from St Andrews Anglican boarding school in Nukuʻalofa on Tongatapu. They had stolen a 7.3-metre (24 ft) boat on short notice and with little preparation. After they anchored for the night (approximately 10 kilometres (5 mi) north of Tongatapu), a storm broke their anchor rope. The boat's sail and rudder were destroyed quickly by the wild winds. Over the next eight days, they drifted for almost 320 km (200 mi) generally southwest, bailing water from their disintegrating boat until they sighted ʻAta; at that point, they abandoned their ship and swam to shore over the next 36 hours, using planks salvaged from the wreck.

== Cast away ==
Mano was the first to reach land; weak from hunger and dehydration, he could not stand but called out that he had safely reached shore, and the rest followed him. After escaping the sea, the boys dug a cave by hand and hunted seabirds for meat, blood, and eggs.

Initially, they were desperate for food and water, but their situation improved after three months when they discovered the ruins of the village of Kolomaile in the island's volcanic crater, following a two-day climb. They revived the remnants of 19th century habitation, surviving on feral chickens, wild taro, and bananas; they captured rainwater for drinking in hollowed-out tree trunks. They drank blood from seabirds when they did not have enough water. The boys divided up the labour, teaming up in pairs to work garden, kitchen, and guard duty. One of the boys, Stephen (who would go on to become an engineer), managed to use two sticks to start a fire, which the boys kept burning continuously for more than a year while marooned.

At night, they sang and played a makeshift guitar to keep their spirits up, composing five songs during their exile. Once, they attempted to sail away on a raft they made, but it broke up approximately 1 mile (1.6 km) offshore, and they were forced to return. The breakup of their raft was fortunate in retrospect, as the boys believed they were in Samoa and had started sailing south into the open ocean.

== Rescue ==
They were so scared, because we were all naked, long hair. We all hopped in the water and swim out to the boat ... Mr. Warner did not put the ladder down because they were all scared about us, but luckily we could speak to him in English and we talk, he give us a few questions, he give us a few photos from Tonga. He showed us the photo of our queen, we said, 'yes that's our queen, Queen Sālote' ... Sort of testing and trying to find out if what we're telling him is true or not.

— "Mano" Totau, 2020 interview with Kate Lyons, published in The Guardian

On 11 September 1966, the Australian fishing boat Just David, captained by Peter Warner, approached ʻAta after Warner noticed patches of burned grass on the island's cliffsides. Warner, moonlighting as a fisherman operating out of Tasmania, was sailing near ʻAta while returning home. Just David crew members included John Derrick, Barry Hall, Peter Carly and Howard Neumann.

After spotting the unkempt, naked boys through binoculars, Just David approached cautiously, as Warner had been told that serious criminals were sometimes marooned on remote islands. When the ship was close enough, Stephen dived in and swam to the boat, explaining himself in English.

To verify their story, Warner radioed their names to Nukuʻalofa and after a 20-minute wait, was told, "You found them! These boys have been given up for dead. Funerals have been held. If it's them, this is a miracle!"

== Aftermath ==
Upon later examination, all six boys were healthy.

After an enormous celebration, the group was hired by Warner to crew a lobster boat. During the feasts, the families of the castaway boys promised to teach Warner the secrets of how and where to fish for the Pacific spiny lobster, and Warner was given a royal concession to trap the spiny lobster in Tongan waters as a reward for rescuing the group, befriending King Tāufaʻāhau Tupou IV.

When the boys did not show up for a party Warner was holding in their honour, he learned they had been arrested because the owner of the stolen boat pressed charges against them. Warner then arranged with Channel 7 in Sydney to film their story; he used £150 (USD $203) from the sale of the rights to compensate the stolen boat's owner for its loss, and in return, the owner dropped the charges.

The Channel 7 television crew sailed with Warner and the boys back to ʻAta to film a re-enactment of their story, The Castaways, which was broadcast in October 1966. One 16 mm film copy of the 1966 documentary survives today; it is available on YouTube.

== Later documentaries and books ==
In 2015, Spanish explorer Álvaro Cerezo spent 10 days on ʻAta island with Kolo Fekitoa, one of the castaways (by then in his mid-60s). The two men lived there alone and survived on coconuts, fish, and seabirds, exactly as the boys had back in 1965. In summer 2020, Cerezo released a documentary of his experience with Kolo and a book detailing the 15-month ordeal of the castaways.

In 2020, historian Rutger Bregman wrote about the castaways' civilized experiences in his book Humankind: A Hopeful History, as a rebuttal to the novel Lord of the Flies, in which a group of castaway boys on a deserted island descend into savagery. In addition, the film studio New Regency acquired the film rights for the boys' experience for a possible feature film.
