= Pangai (ʻEua) =

Village in Tonga

- Village
- Interactive map of Pangai
- Coordinates: 21°22′00″S 174°57′15″W
- Country: Tonga
- District: ʻEua

Population (2021)
  - Total: 249
- Time zone: UTC+13:00

Pangai is a village on the island of ʻEua in Tonga. It is one of the original villages of ʻEua, and is located on the western side of the island. The population is 249.
