= Silva McLeod =

Tonga's first woman pilot

- Born: 1961 (age 63–64); Pangaimotu
- Other names: Vaisiliva McLeod
- Occupation(s): Pilot, writer
- Years active: 1992 to present
- Employer(s): Royal Tongan Airlines; Aeropelican; Royal Flying Doctor Service; Virgin Atlantic
- Known for: Tonga's first woman pilot

Silva McLeod (born 1961) is a Tongan pilot and writer, who in 1992, according to the Australian Aviation Authority, became the first woman from Tonga to be awarded a pilot's license.

McLeod grew up on the island of Pangaimotu in Vava’u, in a home without electricity. As a child had an intense interest in aeroplanes, watching them fly over her house as often as she could. After her marriage in 1980, she moved to Australia in 1981, later living in Melbourne, and it was her husband who purchased her first flying lessons for her. In 1992, according to the Australian Aviation Authority, became the first woman from Tonga to be awarded a pilot's license. By 1998, at the age of 37, McLeod was working full time as a captain for Royal Tongan Airlines. She has also flown for Aeropelican, Royal Flying Doctor Service and for Virgin Atlantic, the latter including Boeing 737 and Boeing 777 aircraft. McLeod also experienced racism and sexism, whilst working as a pilot.

In 2023, McLeod published her memoir Island Girl to Airline Pilot.
