= Avalau (Tonga) =

Island of Tonga

Coordinates: 18°45′S 174°05′W

Avalau, also known as Ovalau, is an island in Tonga, it is located in Motu district within the Vava'u Group, which is in the far north of the country.
