= AATA =

AATA or Aata may refer to:

- Administrative Appeal Tribunal of Australia
- American Art Therapy Association
- Animal Transportation Association, a worldwide nonprofit organization
- Ann Arbor Area Transportation Authority, formerly the Ann Arbor Transportation Authority (AATA)
- Aata (2007 film), an Indian Telugu romantic action film
- Aata (2011 film), an Indian Kannada film

== See also ==
- ATA (disambiguation)
