= Leimatuʻa =

Leimatu'a
- Interactive map of Leimatu'a
- Coordinates: 18°36′8.9″S 173°58′53.94″W
- Country: Tonga
- Division: Vavaʻu
- Time zone: UTC+13 (–)
  - Summer (DST): UTC+14 (–)

Leimatuʻa is a district of Vavaʻu division, Tonga.
