= ʻEua Motuʻa =

Place in ʻEua, Tonga

- Location within Tonga
- Coordinates: 21°20′30″S 174°55′56″W
- Country: Tonga
- Division: ʻEua

Population (2021)
  - Total: 2,771
- Time zone: UTC+13 (–)
  - Summer (DST): UTC+14 (–)

ʻEua Motuʻa is a district of ʻEua division, Tonga. The population is 2,771.
