= Haʻatuʻa =

- Village
- Interactive map of Haʻatuʻa
- Coordinates: 21.393°S 174.962°W
- Country: Tonga
- District: ʻEua

Population (2021)
  - Total: 486
- Time zone: UTC+13:00

Haʻatuʻa is a village on the island of ʻEua in Tonga. It is one of the original villages of ʻEua, and is located on the western side of the island. For census purposes the village is combined with Kolomaile, and the combined population is 486.
