= Peter Warner =

Australian fisherman and yachtsman (1931–2021)

- Born: 22 February 1931; Melbourne, Victoria, Australia
- Died: 13 April 2021 (aged 90); Ballina, New South Wales, Australia
- Known for: Discovering six Tongan youths that had been presumed dead

Peter Raymond Warner (22 February 1931 – 13 April 2021) was an Australian seafarer and ship's captain who discovered six Tongan youths marooned on a Pacific island in 1966, more than a year after they had been presumed dead. He also won the line honours three times in the Sydney to Hobart yacht race.

== Early life ==
Peter Warner was the youngest son of businessman and politician Sir Arthur Warner (1899–1966), who was head of Electronic Industries, and Ethel Wakefield. He had one brother.

== Sailing career ==
Warner ran away from home at the age of 17, wanting to sail boats, and not wanting to be a part of his wealthy father's large business. Upon his return a year later, his father made him finish school, and enroll in law at the University of Melbourne. However after six weeks of studying law, he ran away to sea again and did not return for three years. During that time, he served in both the Swedish and Norwegian navies. After learning Swedish, he sat for the exams to obtain a Swedish master's ticket.

Upon returning to Australia, Warner finally joined his father's business, staying for five years and studying accountancy. While working for his father, as a side business, Warner acquired a small fleet of fishing boats based in Tasmania. From time to time, he would take a break from business and work aboard boats in the fleet.

Skippering his yacht, Astor, Warner won line honours in 1961, 1963, and 1964 in the annual Sydney to Hobart yacht race, and came second in 1962 by 1 minute. The boat was named after the Warner family's household appliance company, Astor Radio Corporation.

=== Boys marooned on the island of 'Ata ===
On 11 September 1966, Warner was sailing his Australian fishing boat Just David past the Tongan island of ʻAta. He noticed patches of burned grass on the island's cliff sides, which he thought unusual, and approached to investigate. Warner was greeted by the six boys, who had been keeping a lookout for more than a year. Although they had lit signal fires each time a ship passed, four had failed to sight the boys. Once aboard Warner's boat, they told him that they were students at a boarding school in Nukuʻalofa, the Tongan capital. They had decided to steal a fishing boat one day, only to get caught in a storm. The boys had fallen asleep after dropping anchor north of the island of Tongatapu, when a squall broke their anchor rope and they drifted out into wild seas and gale-force winds. Their trip to the island lasted eight days, and they needed to constantly bail water from the 24 ft boat. Fortunately, when at anchor they had caught some fish, and by eating it raw were kept sustained during the journey. The boat was beginning to break up when they sighted ʻAta, the southernmost island in the Tongan group.

One of the boys, Sione Filipe Totau, went ashore first to scout the island. The others joined him, but it was nighttime and they were weak from hunger and thirst. That night the boys went hunting, drinking the blood of sea birds and draining their eggs. Once established on the island, they climbed to the top of a volcanic crater where they found wild taro, bananas and chickens descended from those cultivated when the island had been inhabited a century earlier. By the time Warner arrived, the boys had set up a commune with a food garden, hollowed-out trees to store rainwater, a gymnasium, badminton court, chicken enclosures, and a permanent fire.

Upon their return, the boys were greeted by their friends and relatives, who had presumed them dead and held their funerals. However, they were arrested for stealing the boat, as its owner, Mr. Taniela Uhila, wanted to press charges. Warner helped the boys get out of jail by paying Uhila for the boat. He also secured the documentary rights to the story, with the boys acting as themselves in the film. He later had a new ship built and hired the boys as crew.

Author Rutger Bregman has contrasted the incident with Lord of the Flies, the 1954 novel by William Golding.

=== Second saved crew ===
In 1974 Warner was undertaking sea trials of his refurbished fishing boat Ata. On reaching Middleton Reef in the Tasman Sea he discovered four sailors, a Welsh captain and crew, a New Zealand nurse, an Australian teacher and an Australian student, from the sailing boat Sospan Fach who had been shipwrecked. The crewman who sighted the distress flashes from a mirror was Sione Filipe Totau, the lead boy from Ata Island – now a deckhand on Warner's ship.

== Later years ==
In 1968, Warner moved with his family to Tonga and lived there for the next three decades. In 1990, he became a member of the Baháʼí Faith and, in 1996, he helped found the Ocean of Light International School in Tonga, a Baháʼí school. In the 1990s, Warner’s career turned from fishing and shipping to horticulture, tree management, and the farming of nuts. Several years after returning to Australia in 1998, Warner founded Tree Carers Pty Ltd, a business dedicated to nut farming.

== Autobiographies ==
In 2019, Warner published a book about his life as a fishing boat captain and ocean racing sailor. He published three volumes of his autobiography:

- Astor: Adventures Ashore & Afloat (2020), on his upbringing and taking to sea and his yachting successes up to 1965.
- Ocean of Light: 30 years in Tonga and the Pacific (2020), on his time from finding the Tongan boys in 1966, establishing a fishing fleet and then a small shipping line based in Tonga, until his intended retirement to Australia in the mid-1990s.
- Twilight of the Dawn (2020), on his attempts to retire—always frustrated by his entrepreneurial spirit and a wish to solve problems—with his search for meaning in an age of excess information and poor wisdom.

== Death ==
On 13 April 2021, Warner drowned when his boat capsized attempting to cross the Ballina Bar at the mouth of the Richmond River. He was 90 years old at the time of his death.
