= ʻEua National Park =

National park in Tonga

- IUCN category II (national park)
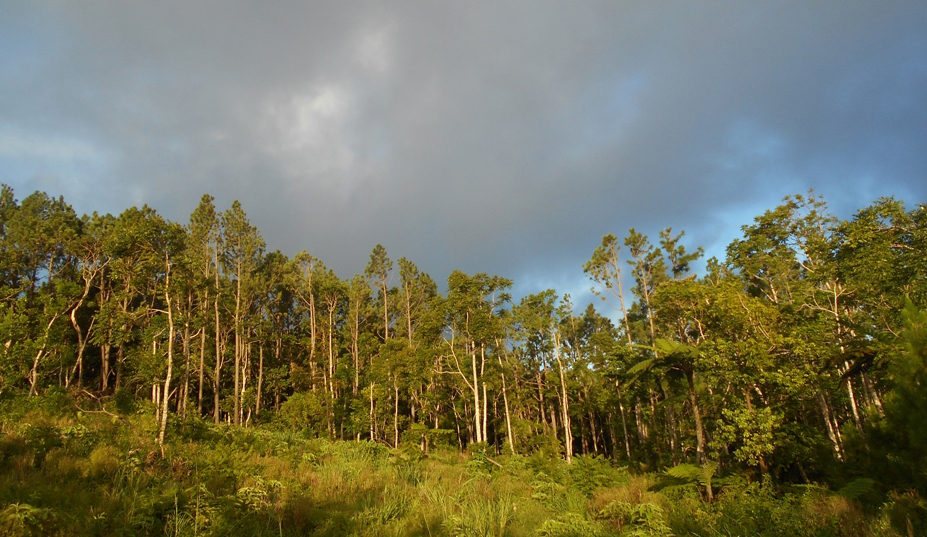
- ʻEua National Park
- Interactive map of ʻEua National Park
- Location: ʻEua Island, Tonga
- Coordinates: 21°24′06″S 174°54′27″W
- Area: 4.51 km^{2} (2 sq mi)
- Established: 1992
- Governing body: Ministry of Environment and Climate Change (Forestry Division)

ʻEua National Park is a national park on the island of ʻEua in Tonga. It is the country's only national forest park and covers an area of 4.51 km^{2} (2 sq mi). The park is located on the east coast of the island and covers an 800 metres (2,625 ft) band of tropical rainforest and is bordered on the west by sheer cliffs to the ocean, which have numerous caves and chasms. It received national park status in 1992. The area is protected by IUCN.

== Biodiversity ==
=== Endemic flora ===
- Aglaia heterotricha
- Arytera bifoliata
- Discocalyx listeri
- Dysoxylum tongense
- Guioa lentiscifolia
- Phyllanthus amicorum
- Pittosporum yunckeri
- Podocarpus pallidus, a rare and endangered conifer (approximately 1,000 trees) found in this location.
- Polyalthia amicorum
- Robiquetia tongensis
- Syzygium crosbyi
- Xylosma smithiana

=== Endemic fauna ===
- Lepidodactylus euaensis (Eua forest gecko), a rare and endangered gecko.
- Prosopeia tabuensis (red shining-parrot or red-breasted Koki), a species of parrot.
- Aerodramus spodiopygius (white rumped swiftlet)
- Phaethon lepturus (white-tailed tropicbird)

== See also ==
- National parks of Tonga
- List of National Parks
