= Vaini =

Coordinates: 21°11′35.36″S 175°10′26.88″W

- Interactive map of Vaini
- Country: Tonga
- Division: Tongatapu

Area
  - Total: 23.9 km^{2} (9.2 sq mi)

Population (2021)
  - Total: 3,295
- Time zone: UTC+13:00 (–)
  - Summer (DST): UTC+14:00 (–)

Vaini is a district of Tongatapu division, Tonga.
