= Taʻanga =

Village in Tonga

Coordinates: 21°20′25.07″S 174°56′57.08″W

Taʻanga is a village on the island of ʻEua in Tonga. It is located on the western side of the island, just north of 'Ohonua. The population is 207.
