= Houma (ʻEua) =

Village in Tonga

- Village
- Interactive map of Houma
- Coordinates: 21°18′55″S 174°55′55″W
- Country: Tonga
- District: ʻEua

Population (2021)
  - Total: 310
- Time zone: UTC+13:00

Houma is a village on the island of ʻEua in Tonga. It is one of the original villages of ʻEua, and is located in the north of the island. The population is 310.
