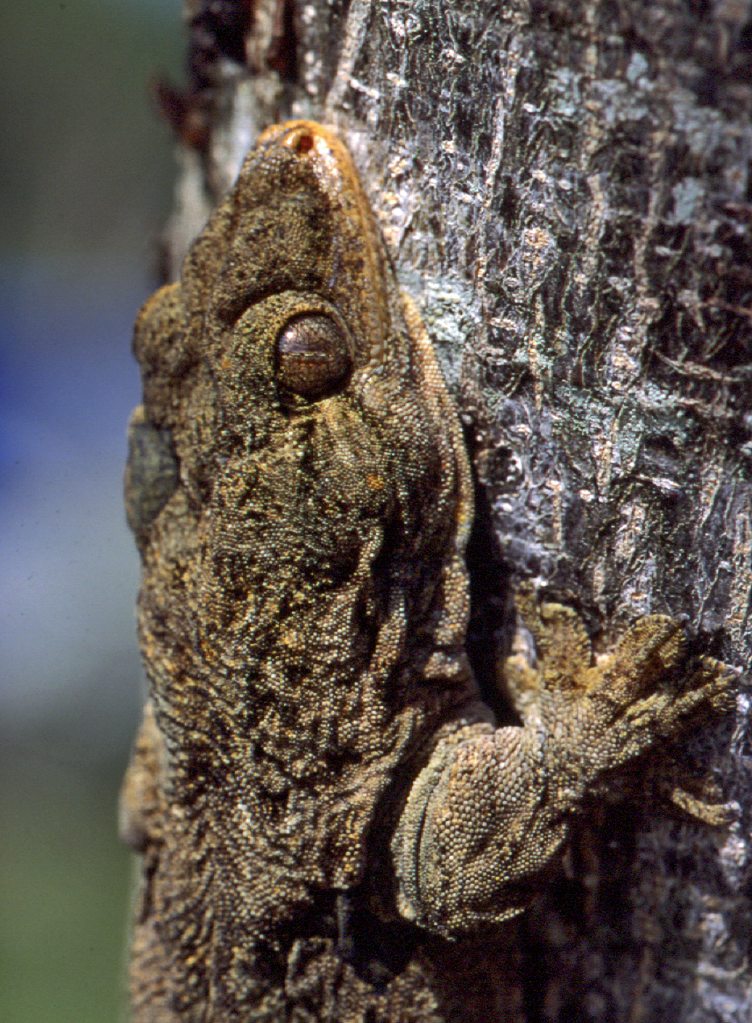

Conservation status
- Vulnerable (IUCN 3.1)

Scientific classification
- Kingdom: Animalia
- Phylum: Chordata
- Class: Reptilia
- Order: Squamata
- Suborder: Gekkota
- Family: Gekkonidae
- Genus: Gehyra
- Species: G. georgpotthasti

Binomial name
- Gehyra georgpotthasti Flecks, Schmitz, Böhme, Henkel & Ineich, 2012
- Gehyra georgpotthasti distribution

= Gehyra georgpotthasti =

Species of lizard

Gehyra georgpotthasti is a species of web-toed gecko, found on several Melanesian and Polynesian islands.

== Description ==
A large, stoutly built gecko. The size from snout to vent is 112 millimetres (4.4 in), plus the tail length of 75 mm (3.0 in). It has a brown color with five dark brown saddle patches between forelimbs and base of tail. The ventral side is light brown with a yellow hue. Iris is brown. The color can vary by showing yellow, reddish and olive elements. The tail has five to six dark bands, which are especially distinct in juveniles and less distinct on adults. Males grow larger than females and have precloacal-femoral pores. Like most geckos, they are oviparous, i.e. reproduce by laying eggs.

The diet includes bananas which is unusual for Gehyras.

Some specimens show green-coloured muscle tissue when the skin is damaged.

The species was described in 2012, as distinct from G. vorax.

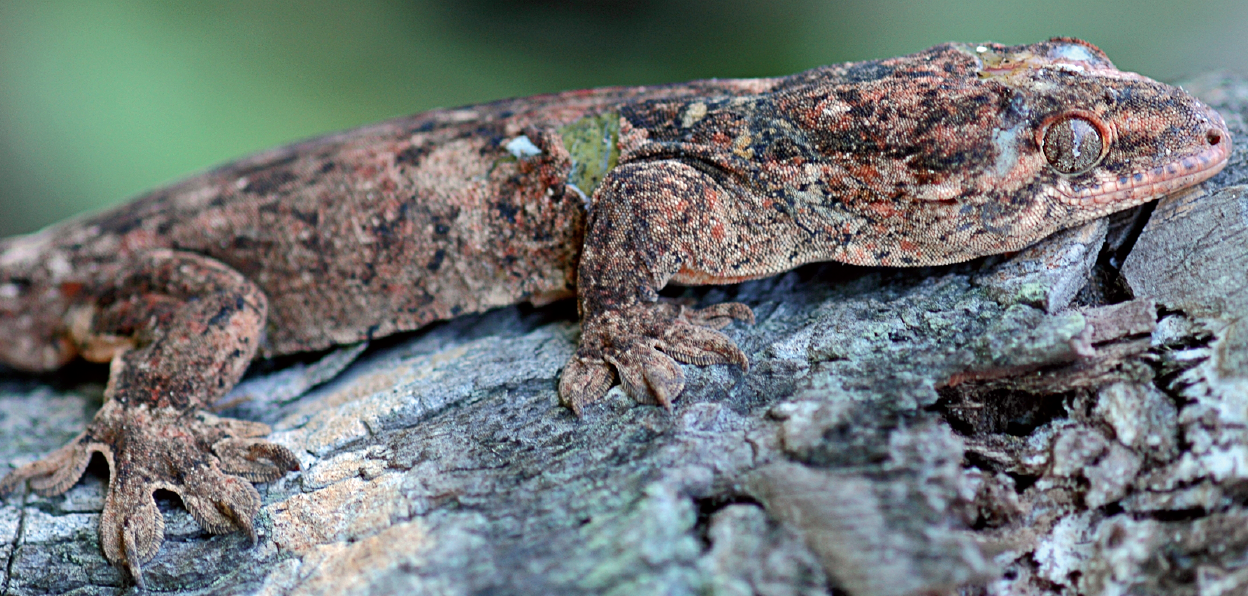
G. georgpotthasti showing green muscle tissue

== Distribution ==
It is found in Loyalty Islands (New Caledonia), Vanuatu and French Polynesia.

== Behaviour ==
The species is generally arboreal and nocturnal, occupying habitats in rainforest and along beaches. Often found on coconut trees.
