= ʻEua Foʻou =

- District
- Location within Tonga
- Coordinates: 21°22′30″S 174°57′14.4″W
- Country: Tonga
- Division: ʻEua

Population (2021)
  - Total: 2,132
- Time zone: UTC+13 (–)
  - Summer (DST): UTC+14 (–)

ʻEua Foʻou is a district of ʻEua division, Tonga. The population is 2,132.
