= American Tinnitus Association =

U.S. nonprofit organization

- Founded: 1971; 55 years ago
- Founders: Jack A. Vernon and Charles Unice
- Founded at: Portland, Oregon, United States
- Type: Nonprofit organization
- Tax ID no.: 93-0749558
- Legal status: 501(c)(3) organization
- Purpose: "The mission and core purpose of the American Tinnitus Association are to promote relief, help prevent, and find cures for tinnitus, evidenced by its core values of compassion, credibility, and responsibility."
- Headquarters: Vienna, Virginia
- Region served: North America
- Method: Education; Endowments; Public policy
- Key people: Torryn P. Brazell, MS, CAE, Chief Executive Officer; Jill Meltzer, AuD – Board Chair
- Website: ata.org

The American Tinnitus Association (ATA) is a nonprofit organization in the United States that promotes relief of, helps prevent, and investigates cures for tinnitus. There is no cure for tinnitus to date, although there are management treatments.

== History ==
The ATA was created as resource for the underserved tinnitus community. Sometimes tinnitus patients are disregarded by physicians who do not have the information needed to proficiently treat and diagnose tinnitus patients.

Jack Vernon, Ph.D. joined Doctor Charles Unice to form the ATA in 1971. The two met while Vernon was conducting clinical research at the Oregon Health Sciences University in Portland, Oregon, and began treating Unice for his tinnitus condition. With aim to raise money for tinnitus funding, the ATA was born. Portland still serves as base for the organization.

The ATA started in a studio sized office and was staffed by Portland area volunteers. Since then the ATA has become the largest group of individual contributors that awards grant money for research relating to tinnitus. Until his death in 2010, Vernon was involved with the organization as an honorary board member, patient advocate, and general adviser.

On December 1, 2017, the ATA moved its headquarters from Portland, Oregon, to Vienna, Virginia (Washington, DC Metro Area).

== Programs and resources ==
Since 1980, the organization has granted around $6 million in seed funding for tinnitus research. Many of the researchers have utilized their ATA-funded research data to apply for and receive larger, federally-funded grants from the Department of Defense, National Science Foundation, and the National Institute on Deafness and Other Communications Disorders (NIDCD), part of the NIH.

The ATA's Tinnitus Advisors Program (TinnAP) provides guidance from healthcare professionals experienced in tinnitus management, including the psychological challenges of tinnitus distress and anxiety.

Tinnitus Today is a magazine focused on the tinnitus patient community, tinnitus research, and the healthcare providers who see tinnitus patients. The publication provides inspiring tinnitus patient stories, tinnitus management strategies, tinnitus treatment information, tinnitus help tools, and news and updates on innovative tinnitus research.

ATA hosts the international "Conversations in Tinnitus" podcast that focuses on current issues in research and treatment methods for people living with tinnitus. Podcasts topics have included:

- exploring noninvasive neuromodulation for tinnitus relief
- habituation to tinnitus using cognitive behavioral therapy
- implementing successful tinnitus treatment
- ototoxicity and tinnitus
- over-the-counter medications for tinnitus relief

The ATA provides tinnitus support groups to promote further awareness of tinnitus, improve treatments, and provide ongoing support for the 25 million Americans who experience tinnitus. In the United States, 22 independent tinnitus support groups provide an opportunity for people to share personal experiences and feelings, coping strategies, or firsthand information about tinnitus and treatments. For many people, a support group can fill a gap between medical treatment and the need for emotional support.

== Committees ==
ATA's Scientific Advisory Committee (SAC) is composed of 17 tinnitus investigators that conduct peer reviews of the grant proposals received by the ATA. The most meritorious proposals are then forwarded to members of the ATA Board of Directors, who make the final funding decisions on these grants.

The ATA's Board of Directors consists of those from the patient community who manifest tinnitus, healthcare providers who see tinnitus patients, i.e. audiologists, tinnitus researchers, and other advocates. Members of the board are influential in creating a non-profit organization that serves as a resource for people with tinnitus.
