= Gehyra membranacruralis =

Conservation status
- Least Concern (IUCN 3.1)

Scientific classification
- Kingdom: Animalia
- Phylum: Chordata
- Class: Reptilia
- Order: Squamata
- Suborder: Gekkota
- Family: Gekkonidae
- Genus: Gehyra
- Species: G. membranacruralis

Binomial name
- Gehyra membranacruralis King & Horner, 1989

Species of lizard

Gehyra membranacruralis, also known as the Port Moresby four-clawed gecko or Port Moresby dtella, is a species of gecko endemic to Papua New Guinea.
