= Africa Travel Association =

Non-profit international travel organization

- Founded: 1975
- Type: 501(c) organization
- Key people: Edward Bergman, Executive director
- Website: www.africatravelassociation.org

Africa Travel Association (ATA) is a non-profit international travel industry trade association established in 1975.

ATA defines its mission as to "promote travel, tourism and transport to and within Africa, and to strengthen intra-Africa partnerships."

ATA serves both the public and private sectors of the international travel and tourism industry. ATA membership comprises African governments, their tourism ministers, tourism bureaus and boards, airlines, cruise lines, hotels, resorts, front-line travel sellers and providers, tour operators and travel agents, media and affiliate members.

ATA partners with the African Union Commission (AUC) to promote the sustainable development of tourism to and across Africa. ATA's annual events in Africa and the United States bring together industry leaders to shape Africa's tourism agenda.

== Structure ==
ATA is registered as a 501(c)6 non-profit trade association in the USA, with its headquarters in Washington D.C. and chapters around the world. ATA is overseen by an international board of directors and managed daily by an executive director and management team.

== Objectives ==
- Advocate for Africa as a leading global travel destination
- Raise awareness of Africa as a destination with rich and diverse tourism opportunities and products
- Promote positive news on Africa
- Develop and promote travel programs to and across Africa
- Assist country and private sector members with marketing
- Serve as a liaison on tourism matters in Africa between member countries
- Present opportunities for members to market and showcase their products and services
- Offer members continuing education, training and learning opportunities
- Help members increase business through exposure, networking and referrals
- Organize events where tourism stakeholders meet to discuss issues of common interest and concern
- Conduct research with partner organizations on tourism matters in Africa

== Events ==
=== The Presidential Forum ===
ATA's Annual Presidential Forums on Tourism, which are hosted by New York University's Africa House, take place in New York every September in parallel with the United Nations General Assembly meetings. This one-day event offers Africa's leaders an important opportunity to speak about how travel and tourism contributes to a country's economy and development. Ten African leaders from the African Union Commission, Benin, Burundi, Ghana, the Gambia, Liberia, Malawi, Morocco, Tanzania and the World Bank addressed the 2010 forum.

=== The US-Africa Tourism Seminar ===
ATA's leading industry event in the USA takes place in conjunction with a leading travel trade show, attracting tourism industry professionals and diplomatic representatives eager to learn about possible policy choices related to tourism in Africa. Participants also explore key growth trends that have helped African tourism grow steadily in recent years and help connect to other companies to develop strategic business partnerships.

=== Promotional road shows ===
ATA increases the visibility of Africa as a destination in the North American marketplace by showcasing the destination and its private sector partners' products in largely untapped metropolitan marketplaces like Phoenix and Montreal as well as in major cities like New York, Los Angeles and Atlanta. ATA also participates in global industry travel trade shows in Europe, Asia and Africa.

=== The Eco and Cultural Tourism Symposium ===
Tourism professionals specializing in sustainable tourism, art, culture, heritage travel, responsible tourism, green travel, and conservation come together to explore Africa's emerging eco and cultural tourism industries. Countries hosting symposiums share their travel products with delegates through on-site field visits and case studies.

Past symposium:

2007/8: Djibouti City, Djibouti, 2006: Calabar, Nigeria, 2005: Luanda Angola, 2004: Kampala, Uganda, 2003: Zanzibar, Tanzania, 2002: Fez, Morocco, 2001: Yaoundé, Cameroon, 2000: Abuja, Nigeria, 1996: Marrakech, Morocco, 1994: Cape Town, South Africa, 1992: Saly/Dakar, Senegal.

=== Annual World Congress ===
ATA's signature event in Africa provides a networking, learning and agenda-shaping platform for 300-500 travel professionals from around the world. The event addresses timely industry topics and offers professional development opportunities. Delegates also participate in roundtables for tourism ministers, an African Bazaar for buyers and sellers, networking events, host country day(s), gala dinners and pre- and post-country tours.

Rwanda will host ATA’s 41st Annual World Congress in Spring 2017.

== Initiatives ==
=== The Young Professionals Program ===
The mission of the Africa Travel Association’s Young Professionals Program (YPP) is to engage tourism and hospitality students and young industry professionals in Africa’s tourism industry and to cultivate future ATA membership. To achieve this mission, YPP offers two programs that serve young people at different points in their education and professional development: (1) The ATA Student Union; and, (2) the ATA Young Professionals Network. Through these two programs, YPP aims to help future industry leaders gain access to tourism professionals focusing on Africa in order to help them build the relationships and networks now that will serve the industry and ATA later. By encouraging the exchange of knowledge, ideas and interests and by providing opportunities for training and travel to Destination Africa, YPP also connects a new generation to ATA and its members who are accomplished tourism professionals.

=== African diaspora ===
Africa diaspora is a critical resource for tourism promotion and investment. To encourage the participation in the industry, ATA has launched the ATA African Diaspora Initiative with the goal of engaging African diaspora leaders, entrepreneurs and media in tourism promotion to Africa.

=== Strategic partnership with the African Union Commission ===
In May 2010, the African Union Commission (AUC) and the Africa Travel Association (ATA) signed a Memorandum of Understanding supporting the "promotion of the sustainable development of tourism in Africa". The MoU was signed with the understanding that major regions of the world have established effective regional tourism bodies, like the Pacific Asia Travel Association (PATA) and the Caribbean Tourism Organization (CTO) and that "Africa has yet to formally adopt as a continent an organization as such to service its tourism marketing, research and advocacy".
