= Motu (Vavaʻu) =

Coordinates: 18°44′35.66″S 174°5′44.76″W

- Interactive map of Motu
- Country: Tonga
- Division: Vavaʻu
- Time zone: UTC+13 (–)
  - Summer (DST): UTC+14 (–)

Motu is a district of Vavaʻu division, Tonga.
