= ʻAta =

Depopulated island in Tonga

Nickname: Pylstaart; Pijlstaart
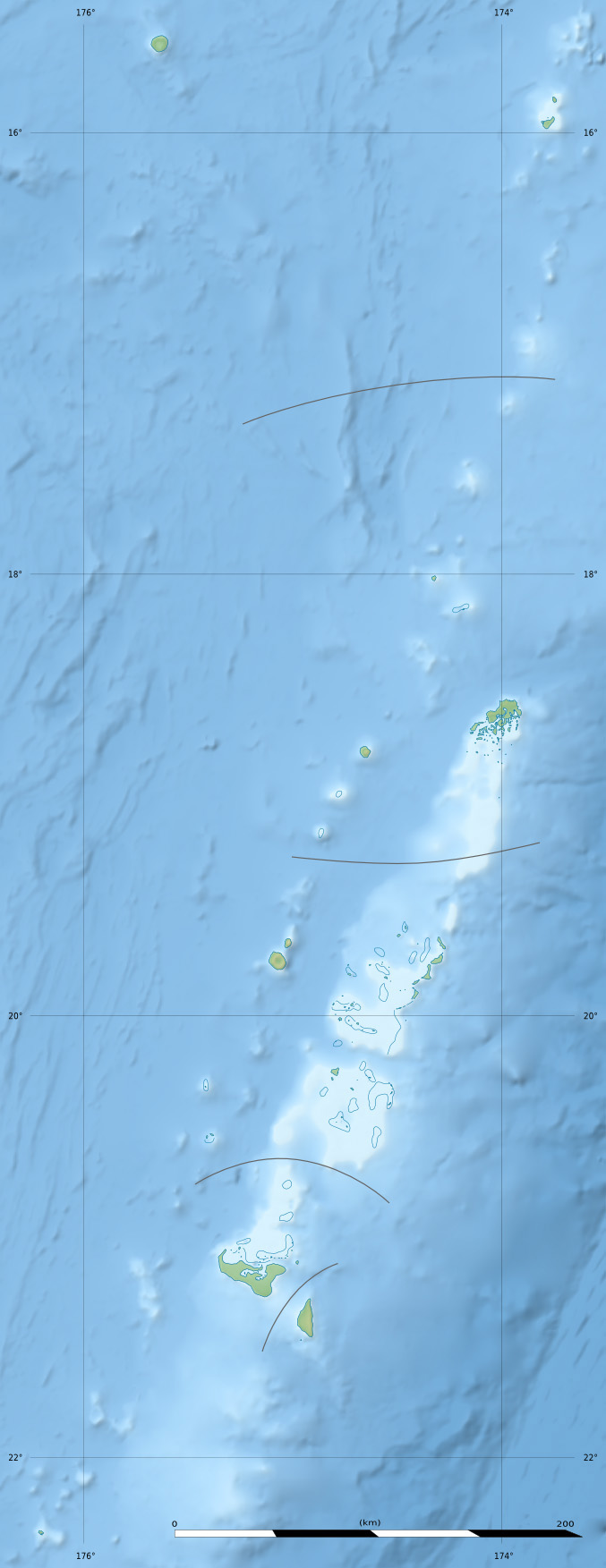
- Location within Tonga Location within Oceania Location within Pacific Ocean

Geography
- Location: Pacific Ocean
- Coordinates: 22°20′30″S 176°12′30″W
- Area: 184 ha (450 acres)

Administration
- Tonga

Demographics
- Population: 0 (uninhabited) (2020)

ʻAta is a depopulated island in the far southern end of the Tonga archipelago, situated approximately 160 kilometres (99 mi) south-southwest of Tongatapu.

It is distinct from ʻAtā, an uninhabited, low coral island in the string of small atolls along the Piha passage along the north side of Tongatapu. An unrelated traditional chiefly title from Kolovai is "Ata". Although superficially spelled in similar ways, ʻAta means reflection in Tongan; Ata means dawn and is the title of a chief; and ʻAtā means more room or expanding.

== Geography ==
Most of ʻAta's land is a high plateau 60 to 100 metres (200 to 330 ft) above sea level, with steep cliffs and rocky beaches ringing the shoreline of the entire island. There are three minor peaks: two on the west side and one on the east side of the island, ranging in elevation from 180 metres (590 ft) (eastern) to 307 and 309 metres (1,007 and 1,014 ft) (western). It has a total land area of approximately 1.5 km^{2} (0.58 sq mi). Although it was apparently formed by volcanic action, no record of volcanic activity exists. The anchorage for ʻAta is on the west side of the island.

The settlement on ʻAta was near the eastern hill. It was named Kolomaile, meaning "Myrtle town." There were three sections of the village; the western section was Hihifo, and the other two were Auloto and Pea.

== Myths ==
Although ʻAta must have been known to Tongans from times immemorial, as it features in old myths, it may have been confused with ʻAtā, and it is alleged not to have been remembered until the Tongans were told about it by the Europeans.

According to Tongan myths it was, together with ʻEua, the first island hauled up by the Maui brothers from the bottom of the sea. It originally had seven hills, but Maui stamped on the highest mountain until it was flattened into its surrounding valleys, and he did likewise with the next mountains. By the time only three hills were left, he was weary and left. With the following islands he hauled up, starting with Tongatapu, he was more careful to keep them flat. The deity Laufakanaʻa was the first ruler of ʻAta.

== History ==
Views of ʻAta

Map

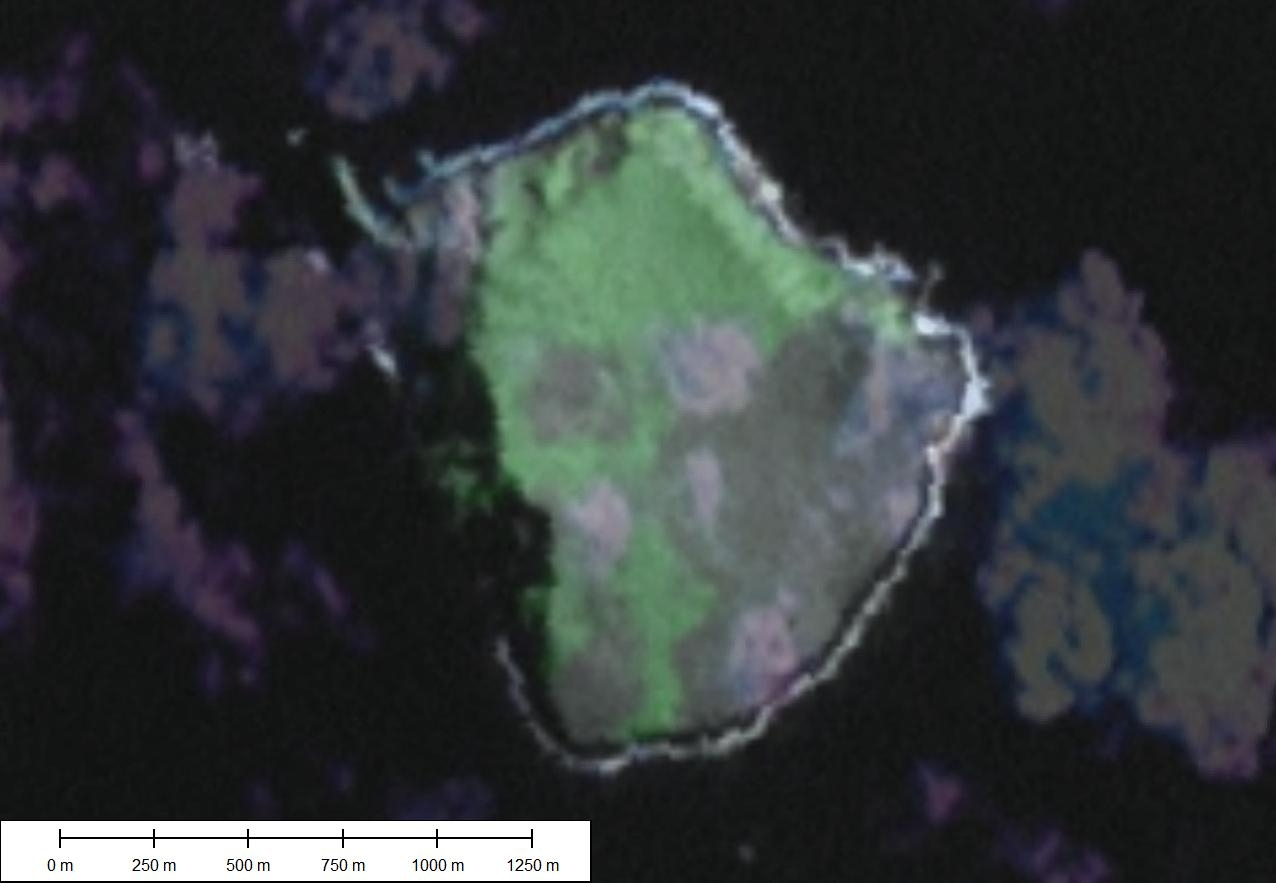
Landsat image

Archaeologist Atholl Anderson spent 18 days exploring the abandoned village of Kolomaile in 1977, accessing it via a steep trail from the island's cobbled northern beach. Although it had been abandoned for over a century, remnants of stone walls and other evidence of human inhabitants were still visible; radiocarbon dating led Anderson to conclude that human settlement on ʻAta dated back to the 1500s or 1600s. Another archaeological survey was conducted in August 2001; fragments of pottery found during the later survey were of a type that had ceased manufacture in Tonga by 400 BC, meaning the settlement on ʻAta was considerably older than previously thought.

According to oral tradition, the diviner Hama discovered ʻAta, but the first Tongans to live there were Motuʻapuaka and Tapuʻosi, who had eloped there to escape the wrath of Tapuʻosi's father, the Tuʻi Tonga Fakanaʻanaʻa; when they arrived in the early 1700s, the aboriginal inhabitants played a rough game which frightened Tapuʻosi, and Motuʻapuaka drove them into a cave, then suffocated them by building a great fire at its mouth. The two lovers were presumably accompanied by attendants, befitting their high status. They and their descendants were joined by other exiles throughout the 1700s.

The first European to access ʻAta was Abel Tasman on 19 January 1643. Because of the many tropicbirds he saw near the island, he gave it the name of Pylstaert Eylant or in modern Dutch Pijlstaart, meaning arrowtail, an apt description for, and in that time the name of the bird. Adverse winds prohibited him from coming closer and no native people were seen coming to him in canoes either. From his position looking towards the northeast the shape of the island resembled to him the breasts of a woman.

The island was visited by Captain James Cook during his second voyage on 7 October 1773, and its coordinates were corrected by the comte de Lapérouse, who referred to the island as île Plistard. As Pylstaart it was well known to whaling ships.

Because of its remote location from the main islands of Tonga, ʻAta was largely self-governed; the Official Report on Central Polynesia by Charles St Julian stated its population was 150 in 1857. It is one of the three islands in Tonga to have been affected by the Peruvian slave trade of 1862 to 1864; of the three, it suffered the most.

=== Slavers and evacuation ===
The captain there induced a large party of natives to come on board to trade, and while they were dining on the 'tween decks, closed the hatches upon them, men, women and children to the number of about 130, and sailed with them for the Peruvian coast.

— Seaman John Bryan of the Grecian, Southland Times, 14 Dec 1863; quoted in Slavers in Paradise (1981)

In 1862, the Peruvian government had decided to invite indentured labourers to collect guano on Peru's Chincha Islands. A fleet of ships spread out over the Pacific, ostensibly to find willing migrants, but they quickly switched to plain kidnapping tactics instead. In June 1863 about 350 people lived on ʻAta in a village called Kolomaile (of which remnants were still visible a century later). Captain Thomas James McGrath of the whaler Grecian, having decided that slave trading was more profitable than whaling, came along and invited the islanders on board for trading. But once almost half of the population was on board, doors and rooms were locked, and the ship sailed away. 144 people never returned.

In 1929, anthropologist Edward Winslow Gifford interviewed two former residents of Kolomaile who were schoolchildren when the Grecian took its slaves; they said that "[Paul] Vehi [Mayor of ʻAta] went aboard and presumably arranged the kidnapping. When he was returned ashore, he made a proclamation that each family was to send a good-looking man aboard with provisions to sell. There was to be no selling on shore, and furthermore the selling on the ships was to take place below decks. Once the Ata people were aboard, they were sent to various rooms to select the goods they wanted in exchange. After they entered the rooms, the doors were locked."

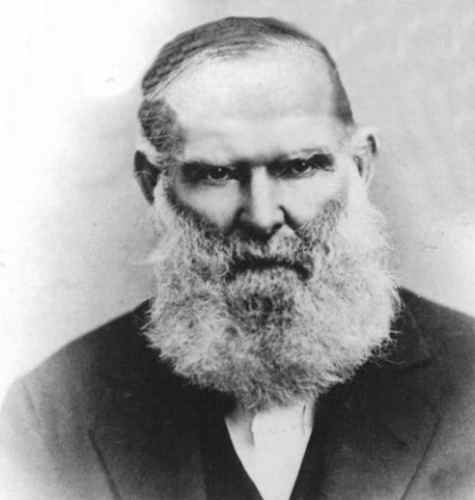
Captain McGrath

The whaler-turned-slaver Grecian next tried to kidnap more slaves from the Lau Islands, but was not successful there. At Niuafouʻou, the second island in Tonga to be affected, Grecian was able to kidnap only 30 people. ʻUiha was to be the third, but there the islanders had actually been able to reverse roles and ambushed the slaver Margarita instead.

Grecian never made it to Peru. Probably near Puka-Puka in the Tuamotus, it met another slaver, the General Prim, which had left Callao in March. Because Grecian never obtained a labour licence from Peru, General Prim was more than willing to take the 174 Tongans back to port, where it arrived on 19 July. Meanwhile, however, the Peruvian government, shocked that its labour plan had turned into a slave trade, had already cancelled all labour importation licenses on 28 April. General Prim and other ships were not allowed to land their captured South Pacific slaves on Peruvian soil, but instead the Peruvian government chartered ships to take them home.

By the time the Adelante, chartered to return the Tongans, finally left on 2 October 1863, many had died or were dying from contagious diseases. In addition, Captain Escurra of the Adelante, which had been one of the most successful slavers before the licenses were revoked, had no intention to take them home after being paid $30 per head. Instead, he marooned them on uninhabited Cocos Island, well off the route to Tahiti, claiming the 426 kanakas were affected with smallpox, endangering his crew. 200 survivors were left when the whaler Active passed along and found them on 21 October. Finally, in November, the Peruvian warship Tumbes came to save the survivors, who had dwindled to just 38. They were brought to Paita, where they apparently were absorbed into the local population.

Meanwhile, in Tonga, King George Tupou I, having heard of the kidnappings, sent three schooners to ʻAta to evacuate and to resettle the remaining population of Kolomaile (about 200 people) to ʻEua, where they would be safe against future attacks. Until modern times, the Vehi family were wrongfully dogged by rumours they had sold the villagers into slavery. McGrath was arrested in Bluff, New Zealand, for tax evasion at the end of November 1863, and the owner of the Grecian laid additional charges that McGrath had disappeared with the ship after being commissioned in 1861 for a whaling expedition.

=== Tongan castaways ===
In June 1965, a group of six Tongan youths were stranded on the island after running away from their strict Anglican boarding school in Nukuʻalofa on Tongatapu. They stole a 24-foot (7.3 m) boat on short notice and with little preparation, and drifted southwest after being caught in a storm. After swimming to the island, they survived on seabirds, as well as feral chickens, wild taro, and bananas from the ruins of Kolomaile. They were rescued on 11 September 1966 by a passing lobster fisherman named Peter Warner. After being returned to Tongatapu, the youths were briefly imprisoned for stealing the boat.

=== Possible resettlement ===
The descendants of the original ʻAta island dwellers still live in the southern village of Haʻatuʻa on ʻEua, of which a part has received the name Kolomaile. Their wish to return to ʻAta was still alive in the mid-20th century, but it is considered unlikely to happen, as the island does not have a harbour, making shipping to it a dangerous and uneconomical adventure. Currently ʻAta, still part of the kingdom of Tonga, remains uninhabited.

== Ecology ==
Since 1863, the island has not been inhabited by a residential human population. Surveys of animal populations have been conducted in 1925 (Whitney South Sea Expedition, 13–14 July) and 1990 (Rinke, 5–8 April).

=== Fauna ===
The only mammal native to the island is Rattus exulans, the Polynesian rat. In a survey conducted in 1990, the most common seabird present was Ardenna pacifica, the wedge-tailed shearwater, with an estimated 20,000 present.

=== Flora ===
The plateau of ʻAta is heavily forested with fig trees.
