= Áta =

Áta Ata
- Village
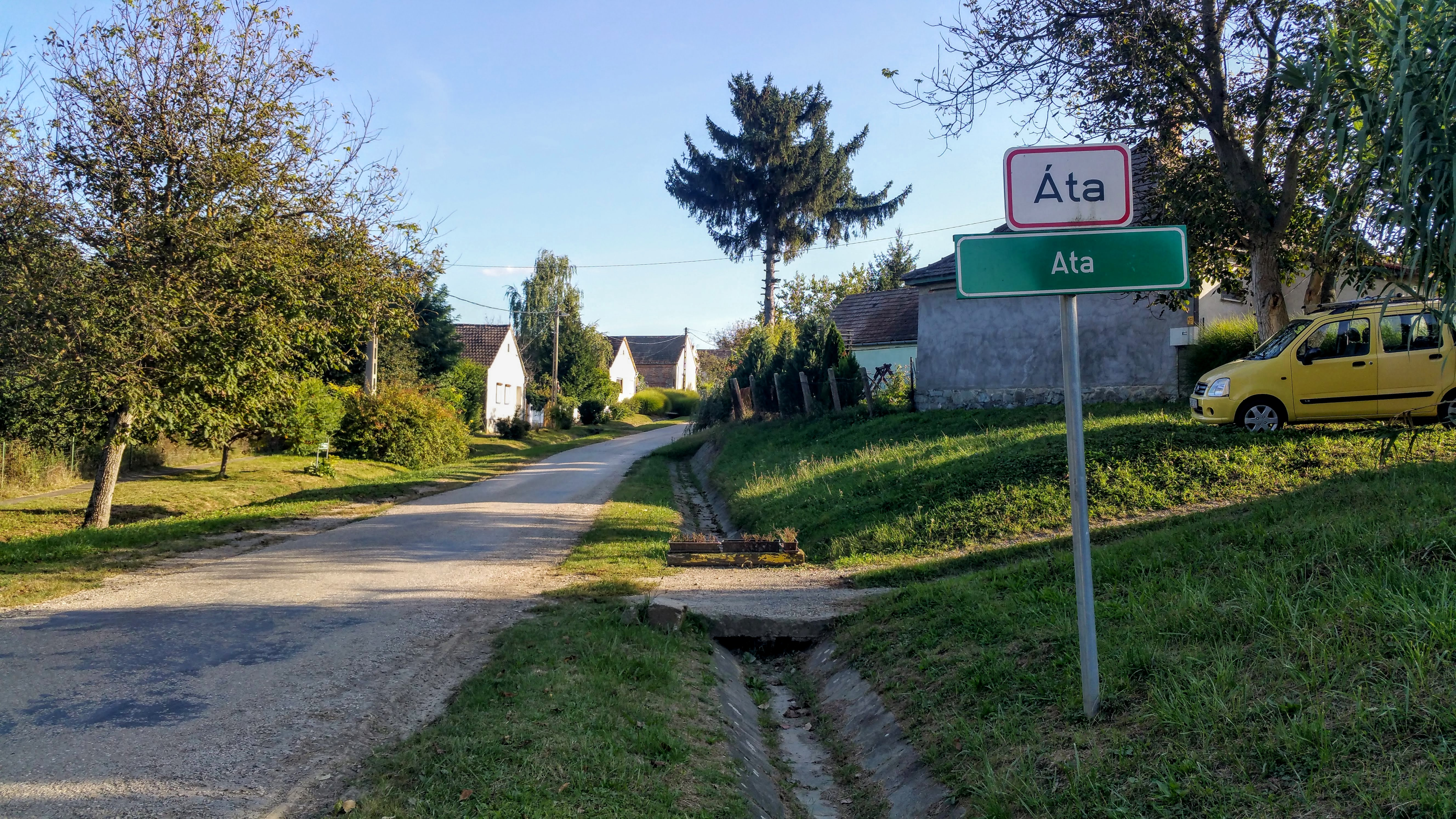
- Áta

- Coat of arms

- Location of Baranya county in Hungary

- Location of Áta
- Coordinates: 45.9367°N 18.2957°E
- Country: Hungary
- County: Baranya

Area
  - Total: 8.09 km^{2} (3.12 sq mi)

Population (2019)
  - Total: 159
  - Density: 19.7/km^{2} (50.9/sq mi)
- Time zone: UTC+1 (CET)
  - Summer (DST): UTC+2 (CEST)
- Postal code: 7763
- Area code: 72

Áta (Croatian: Ata) is a village in Baranya county, Hungary. The 2019 Gazetteer of Hungary shows the population of Áta to be 159 and its area to cover 809 hectares (2,000 acres). Áta railway station to the east of the village is on the Pécs–Villány–Magyarbóly railway line.

== Etymology ==
Áta is a Turkish name which means father. Áta is also used in the name of Atatürk, the founding father of the Republic of Turkey.

== History ==
Áta has been inhabited since ancient times. Before the Hungarian tribes conquered the area, it was inhabited by Slav people. In 1526 the county was occupied by the Ottomans, and was freed in 1689.
