= ʻEua =

Island in Tonga

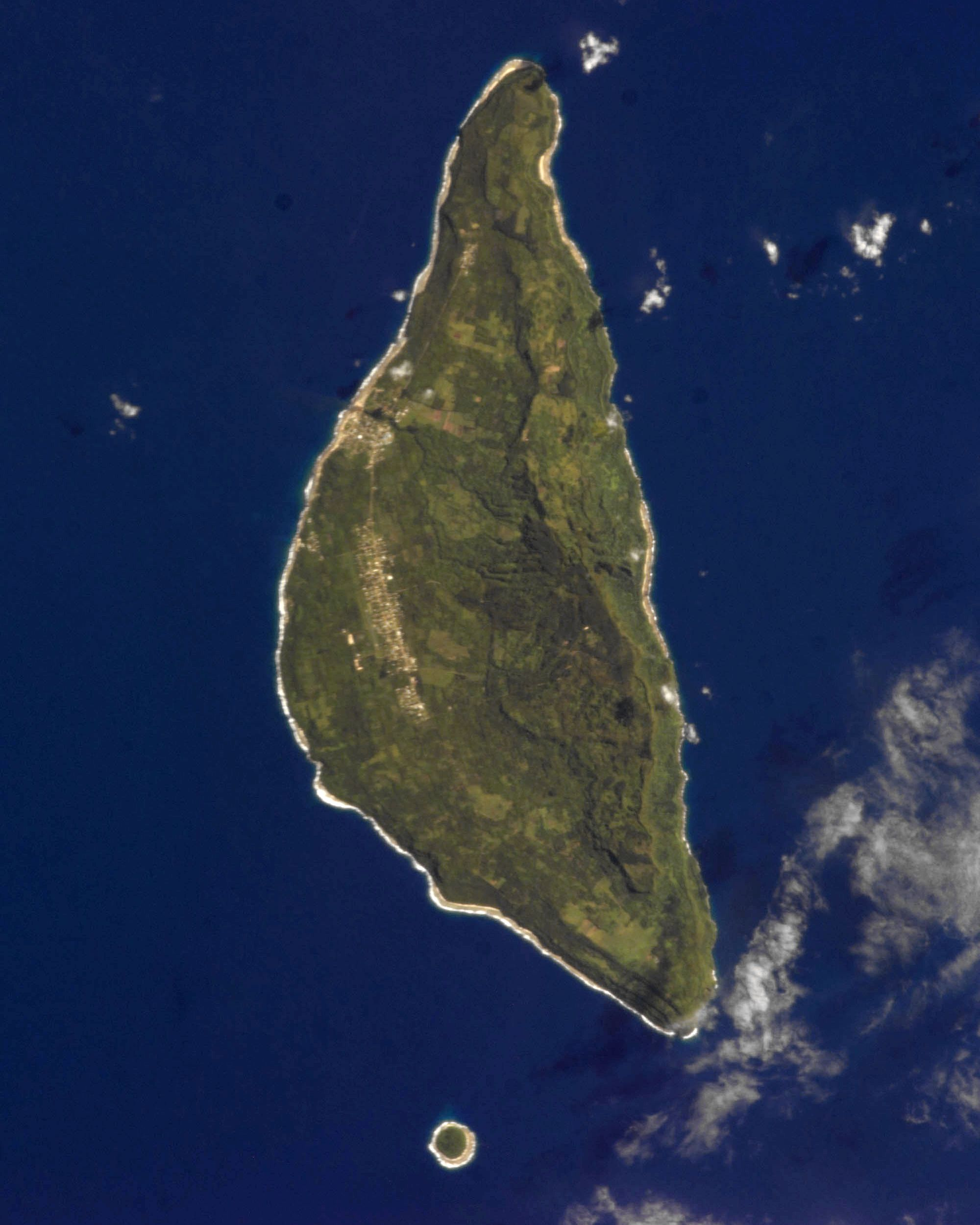

Geography
- Location: Pacific Ocean
- Coordinates: 21°23′S 174°56′W
- Archipelago: Tonga Islands
- Total islands: 2
- Major islands: 1
- Area: 87.44 km^{2} (33.76 sq mi)
- Highest elevation: 312 m (1024 ft)
- Highest point: Funga Fonua

Administration
- Tonga
- Vakaʻuta: KVL
- Largest settlement: ʻOhonua

Demographics
- Population: 4,903 (2021)
- Pop. density: 60.04/km^{2} (155.5/sq mi)
- Ethnic groups: Tongan (majority), European, Chinese, Pacific Islanders

Location of ʻEua District in Tonga

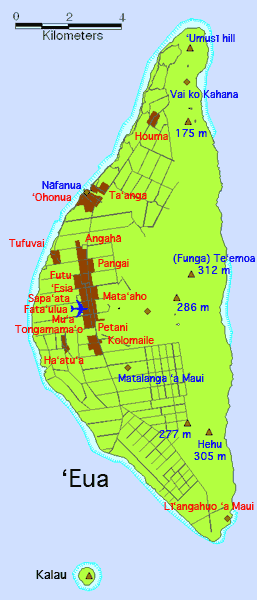
Map of ʻEua

ʻEua (Tongan pronunciation: [ʔe.ˈu.a]), formerly Middelburg Island, is an island in the kingdom of Tonga. It is close to Tongatapu, but forms a separate administrative division. It has an area of 87.44 km^{2} (33.76 sq mi), and a population in 2021 of 4,903 people. The island leads in agriculture, tourism, and some of the forestry helps the island economically.

== Geography ==
ʻEua is a hilly island, the highest peaks are the Teʻemoa (chicken manure) 312 m, and the Vaiangina (watersprings) 305 m. The island is not volcanic, but was shaped by the rubbing of the Tonga Plate against the Pacific Plate, pushing ʻEua up and leaving the 7-kilometre-deep (4.3 mi) Tonga Trench on the bottom of the ocean, a short distance towards the east. The soil of ʻEua is volcanic, as is that of Tongatapu, but only the top layer, deposited by eruptions of nearby volcanoes ten thousands years ago. Under it are the solid rocks of pushed-up coral. ʻEua counts many huge caves and holes, not all of which have yet been explored.

ʻEua and Niuatoputapu are the only islands in Tonga that have streams, and ʻEua had the only bridge in the kingdom until one was also built in Vavaʻu. The stream drains into the harbour near the capital of the island, ʻOhonua.

A unique feature is the shore between ʻOhonua and Tufuvai. It is coral reef still close to the sea level. Many small tidal pools are found, named the ʻotumatafena.

It is served by ʻEua Airport, which has an unsealed coral runway.

== Myths ==
Together with ʻAta, ʻEua was the first island to be created by Tangaloa, see Tangaloa And The Story Of How ʻEua Island Was Created.

== History ==
ʻEua was put on the European maps by Abel Tasman who reached it and Tongatapu on 21 January 1643. He called it Middelburg Island, after the Dutch city of Middelburg, Zeeland. He did not go on land, but proceeded to the Hihifo district of Tongatapu, which he named Amsterdam Island after the capital of the Netherlands.

ʻEua was considered by early missionaries as heathen, and it was the rendezvous for whalers, a place where one could trade goods for guns, knives, axes, and gunpowder. It was the arsenal, or armory of Tonga, as well as its granary.

James Cook visited the island in 1773 and 1777. On his map, it is named Eaoowe.

== Administration ==
ʻEua is divided into two districts:

- ʻEua Motuʻa (Old ʻEua), in the north, with six villages and population of 2,771.
- ʻEua Foʻou (New ʻEua), in the south, with 2,132 inhabitants in nine villages.

The nine villages of the southern district ʻEua Niuafoʻou (or ʻEua Foʻou for short) were founded by people who had to leave their island of Niuafoʻou in 1946 due to a volcanic eruption; they are all named after villages of Niuafoʻou.

The northern district in contrast is Old ʻEua. The southern village of Kolomaile's inhabitants however are descendants of the former inhabitants of the island of ʻAta, Tonga's southernmost island, evacuated after the island was targeted by slavers.

3.8 kilometres (2.4 miles) south-west of the southern tip of ʻEua (Lakufaʻanga) is the 35-acre island Kalau.

== Demography ==
Historical population
| Year | Pop. | ±% |
|---|---|---|
| 1976 | 4,486 | — |
| 1986 | 4,393 | −2.1% |
| 1996 | 4,934 | +12.3% |
| 2006 | 5,206 | +5.5% |
| 2011 | 5,016 | −3.6% |
| 2016 | 4,945 | −1.4% |
| 2021 | 4,903 | −0.8% |

The villages of the original inhabitants of ʻEua are all in the north: Houma, Taʻanga, ʻOhonua, Pangai, Tufuvai.

Haʻatuʻa and Kolomaile are from the original inhabitants from ʻAta, who were resettled there in 1863. The villages just north of that up to Angahā, are from the inhabitants of Niuafoʻou who were resettled there in 1946.

== Ecology ==
ʻEua is the only habitat of the koki (Prosopeia tabuensis) in Tonga. It supports 12 species of birds, nine of lizards, and two bats, the Insular flying fox and Pacific sheath-tailed bat. Bird species include the Buff-banded rail, Pacific imperial pigeon, Crimson-crowned fruit dove, White-rumped swiftlet, Collared kingfisher, Polynesian starling, Polynesian triller and Polynesian wattled honeyeater. During the talent section of the 2026 Miss Heilala pageant, contestant Petiola Masila included a humorous re-enactment of the traditional method of hunting manu'uli birds (wedge-tailed shearwater) by imitating their wailing calls in order to lure them close enough to be struck with a stick. Reptiles include the Oceanic gecko, mourning gecko and blue-tailed skink.

== Culture ==
The 2014 film When the Man Went South was mostly filmed on ʻEua.

== Gallery ==
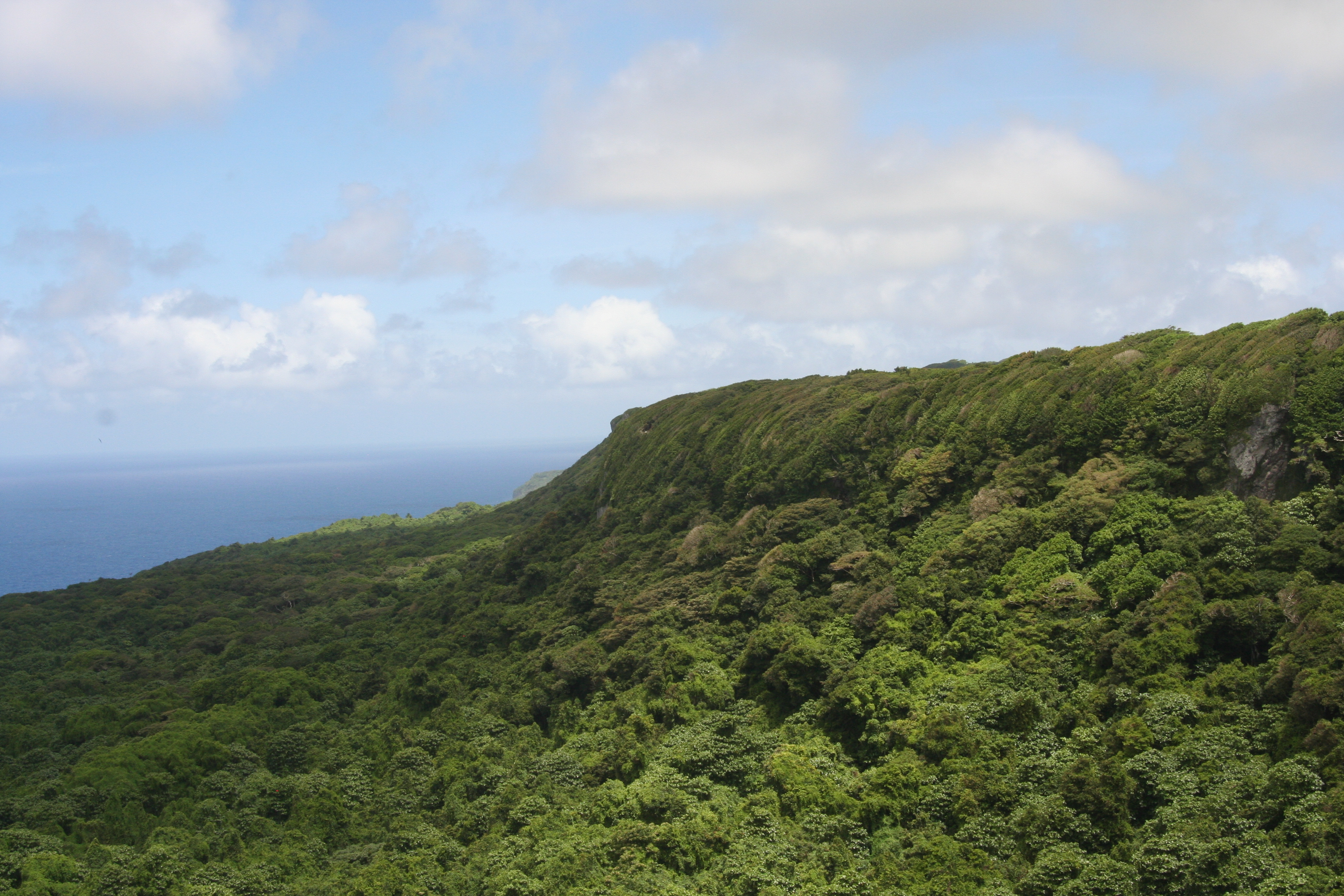
ʻEua National Park, looking south, on the Eastern side of ʻEua

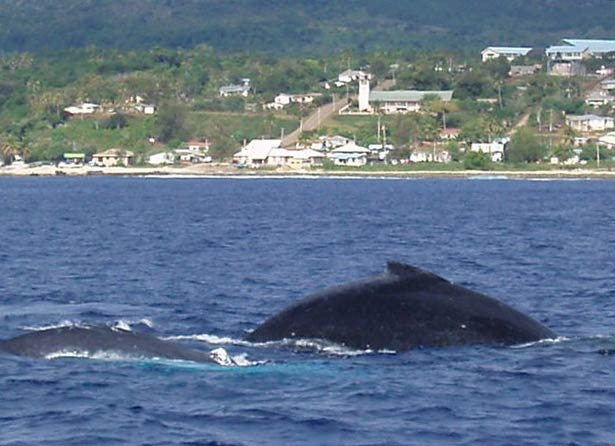
Humpback whales with Ohonua in the background

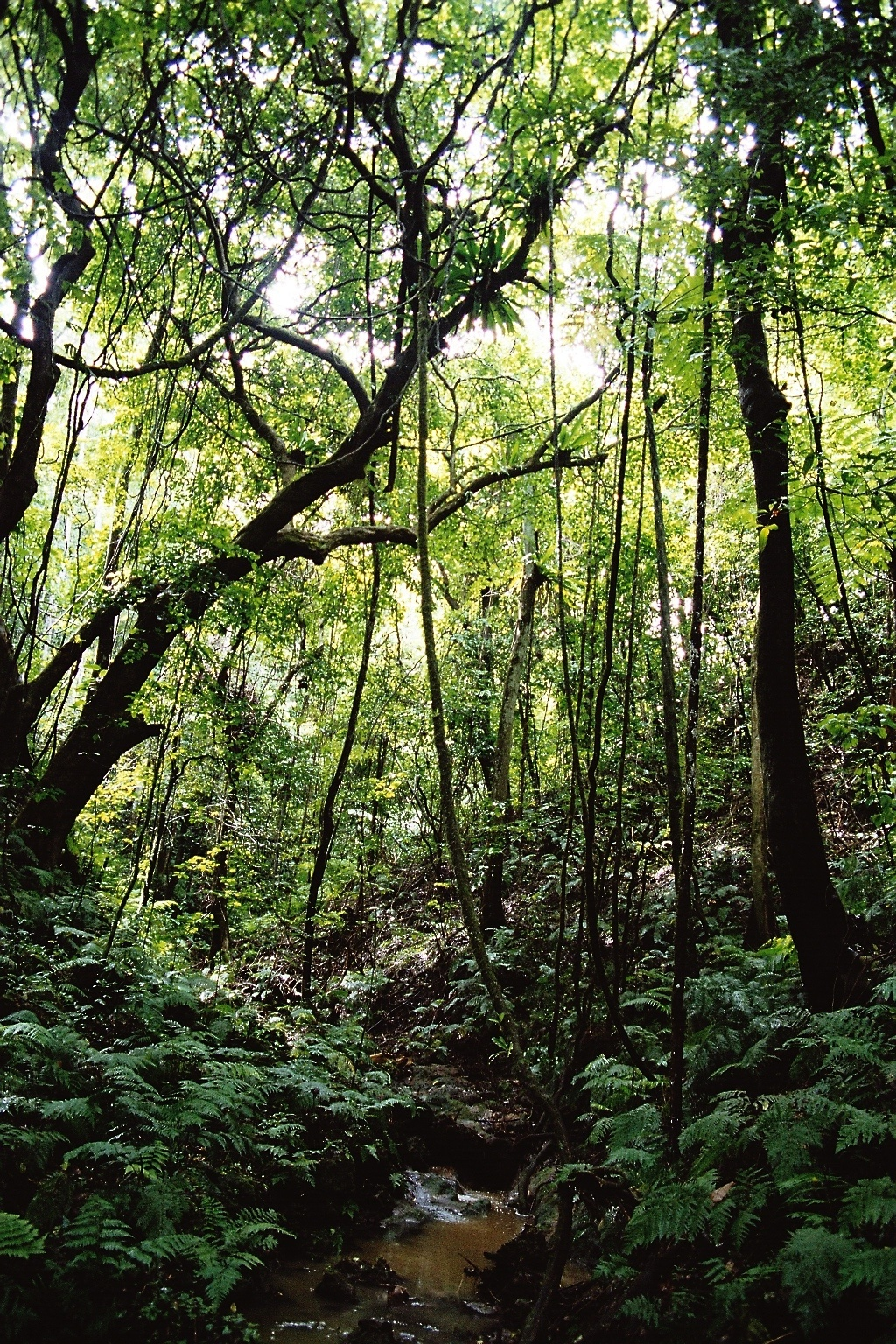
Forest in ʻEua

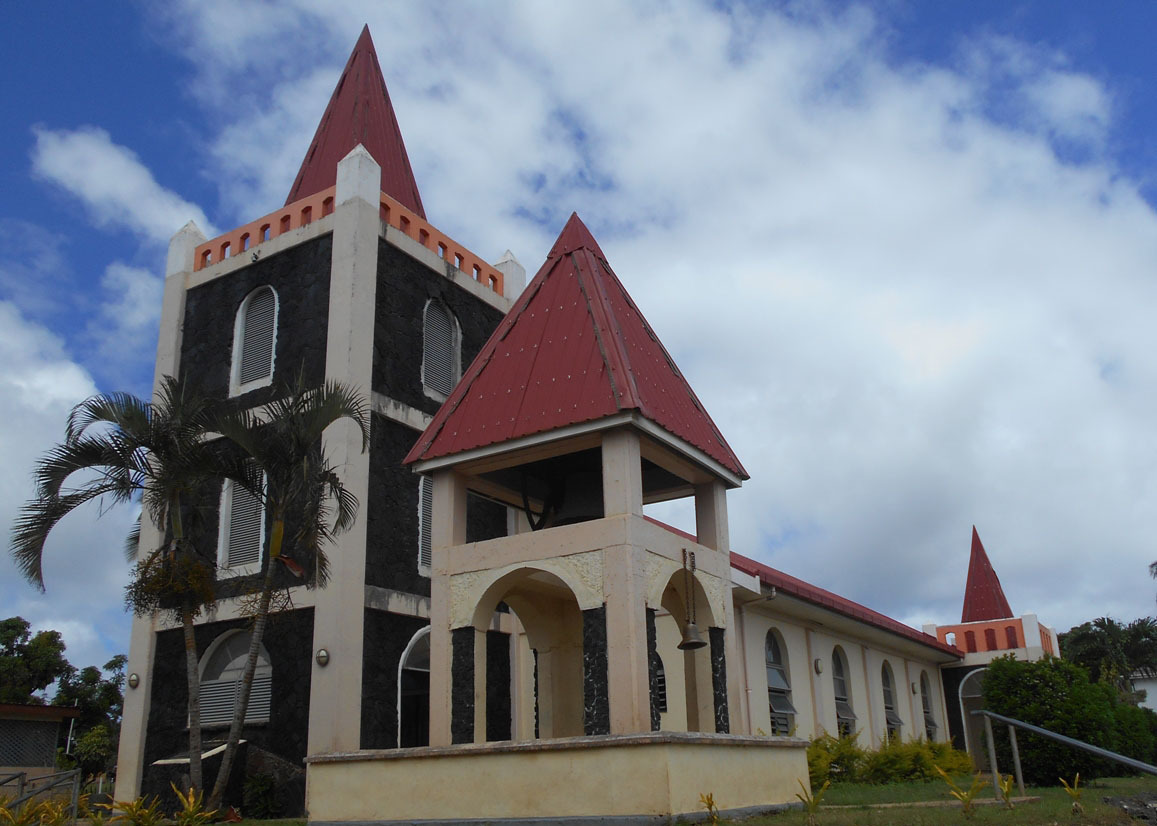
Church on ʻEua

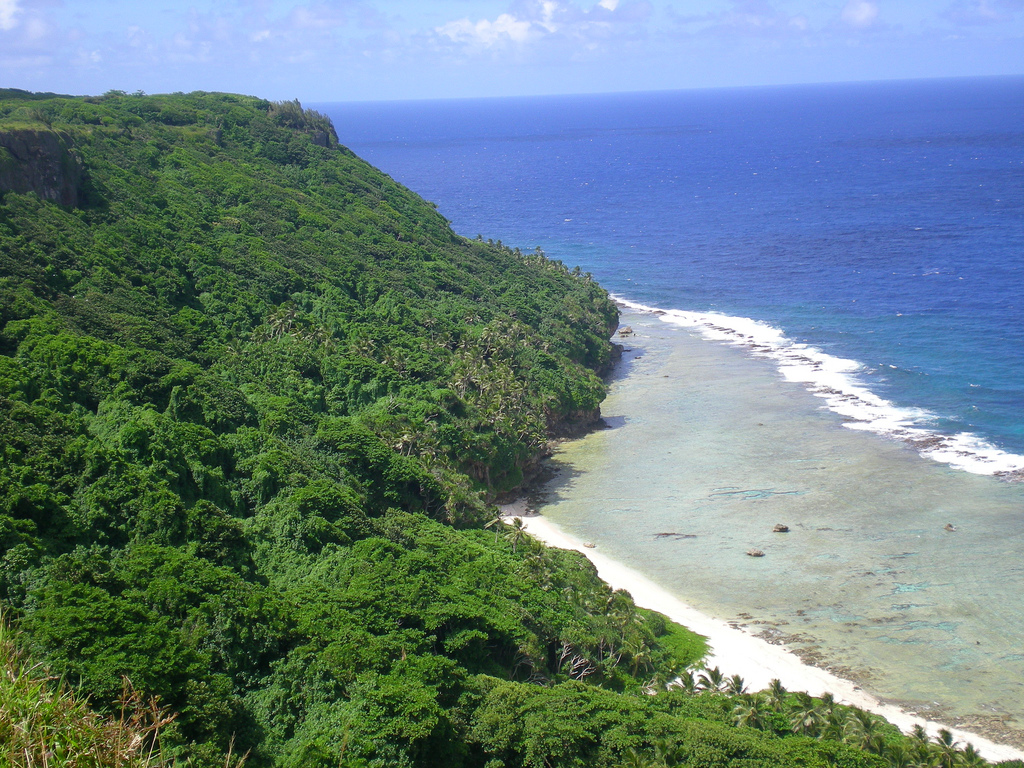
Forested cliffs on ʻEua

== See also ==
- ʻEua National Park
