= Advanced Technologies Academy =

Public high school in Las Vegas, Nevada, US

Coordinates: 36.1862°N 115.1769°W

Location
- 1411 Robin Street; Las Vegas, Nevada 89106; United States

Information
- Type: Magnet public high school
- Motto: Academics Plus Technology
- Established: 1994
- Principal: Mr. Tell Shappley
- Teaching staff: 55.00 (on FTE basis)
- Grades: 9–12
- Enrollment: 1,208 (2023–2024)
- Student to teacher ratio: 21.96
- Campus: Small (12.8 acres/ 0.626 miles^{2})
- Colors: Teal and purple
- Mascot: Maverick
- Website: atech.org

Advanced Technologies Academy (A-TECH/ATA) is a magnet public high school in Las Vegas, Nevada, United States. It focuses on integrating technology with academics for students in grades 9–12. The magnet school program was founded in 1994 and is part of the Clark County School District. The first year included only 9th and 10th grade, adding a grade each year. The first graduating class was 1997, and the first graduating class with all four years of attendance was 1998. The magnet school focuses on computer and technology related study fields.

As of 2024, A-TECH is ranked No. 1 in the state of Nevada and No. 88 nationally by U.S. News & World Report.

== Historical events ==
The gymnasium building began construction during the 1998–1999 school year, and opened in 2000.

Efforts to increase the student population at the school began in the early 2000s. Construction of the school's east wing (including additional classrooms, offices, and a lecture hall) and expansion of the existing cafeteria began in 2002, and were completed in time for the start of the 2003–2004 school year. The expansion increased enrollment from approximately 750 students to just over 1000.

The school has also been a popular stop for some national politicians to discuss their education policy. Visitors include then Vice President Al Gore and Florida Governor Jeb Bush. They were also visited by First Lady Laura Bush in 2004 to talk about President George W. Bush's Jobs for the 21st Century plan announced in the 2004 State of the Union address.

== Awards and recognition ==
- During the 2003–04 school year, Advanced Technologies Academy was recognized with the Blue Ribbon School Award of Excellence by the United States Department of Education, the highest award an American school can receive.
- A-TECH was named a School of Distinction—top Technology Excellence high school—by the Intel corporation in 2005.
- Advanced Technologies Academy was recognized with the Exemplary School Award from the Nevada Department of Education for the graduating classes of 2002, 2003, 2005, and 2010, and received the High Achieving School Award from the Nevada Department of Education for the graduating classes of 2000, 2001, 2004, 2006, and 2007.
- Magnet Schools of America recognized A-TECH as a School of Distinction in 2008.
- U.S. News & World Report selected A-TECH as a Silver Medal Winner of America's Best High Schools in 2008.
- A-TECH was recognized, for the second time, with the Blue Ribbon School Award of Excellence by the United States Department of Education on September 15, 2011.
- A-TECH was recognized, for the third time, with the Blue Ribbon School Award of Excellence by the United States Department of Education on September 26, 2019.
- A-TECH was designated as a Purple Star school by State Superintendent Jhone Ebert on May 13, 2024.
