= Niua Islands =

Island group in Tonga

Niua Group
- Location of Niua Islands in Tonga
- Interactive map of Niua Group

Geography
- Location: Pacific Ocean
- Coordinates: 15°58′S 173°47′W
- Archipelago: Tonga Islands
- Total islands: 3
- Major islands: 2
- Area: 71.69 km^{2} (27.68 sq mi)
- Highest elevation: 560 m (1840 ft)
- Highest point: Piu 'o Tafahi

Administration
- Tonga
- Largest settlement: Hihifo, Niuatoputapu

Demographics
- Population: 1,150 (2021)
- Pop. density: 23.01/km^{2} (59.6/sq mi)
- Ethnic groups: Tongan

Niua is a division of the Kingdom of Tonga, namely the northernmost group of islands. It consists of three islands (Niuafoʻou, Niuatoputapu and Tafahi) which together have an area of 71.69 km^{2} and a population of 1,150. The largest village is Hihifo on Niuatoputapu. Piu'o Tafahi is the highest point with an elevation of 560 m.

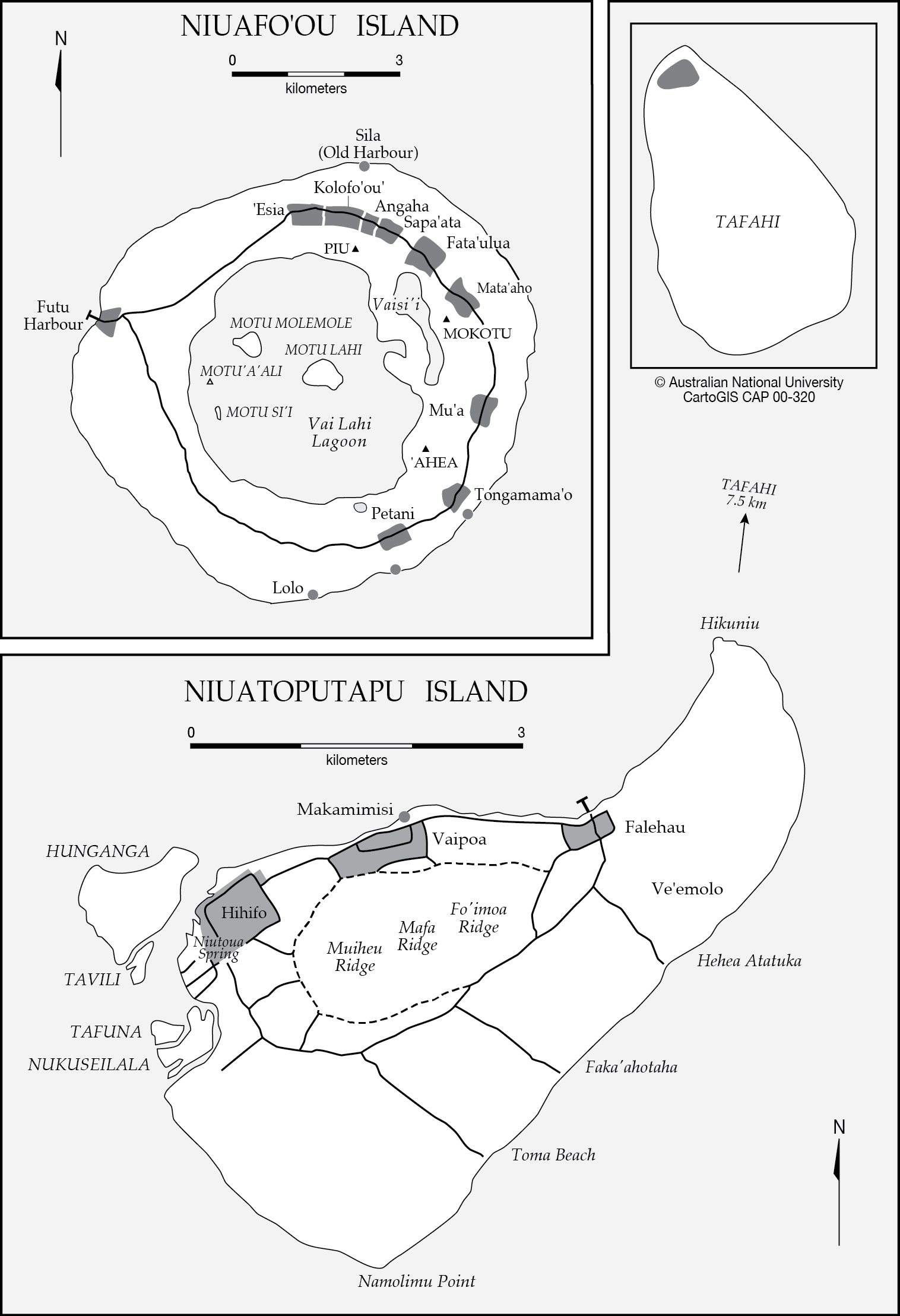
Map of Niua Islands

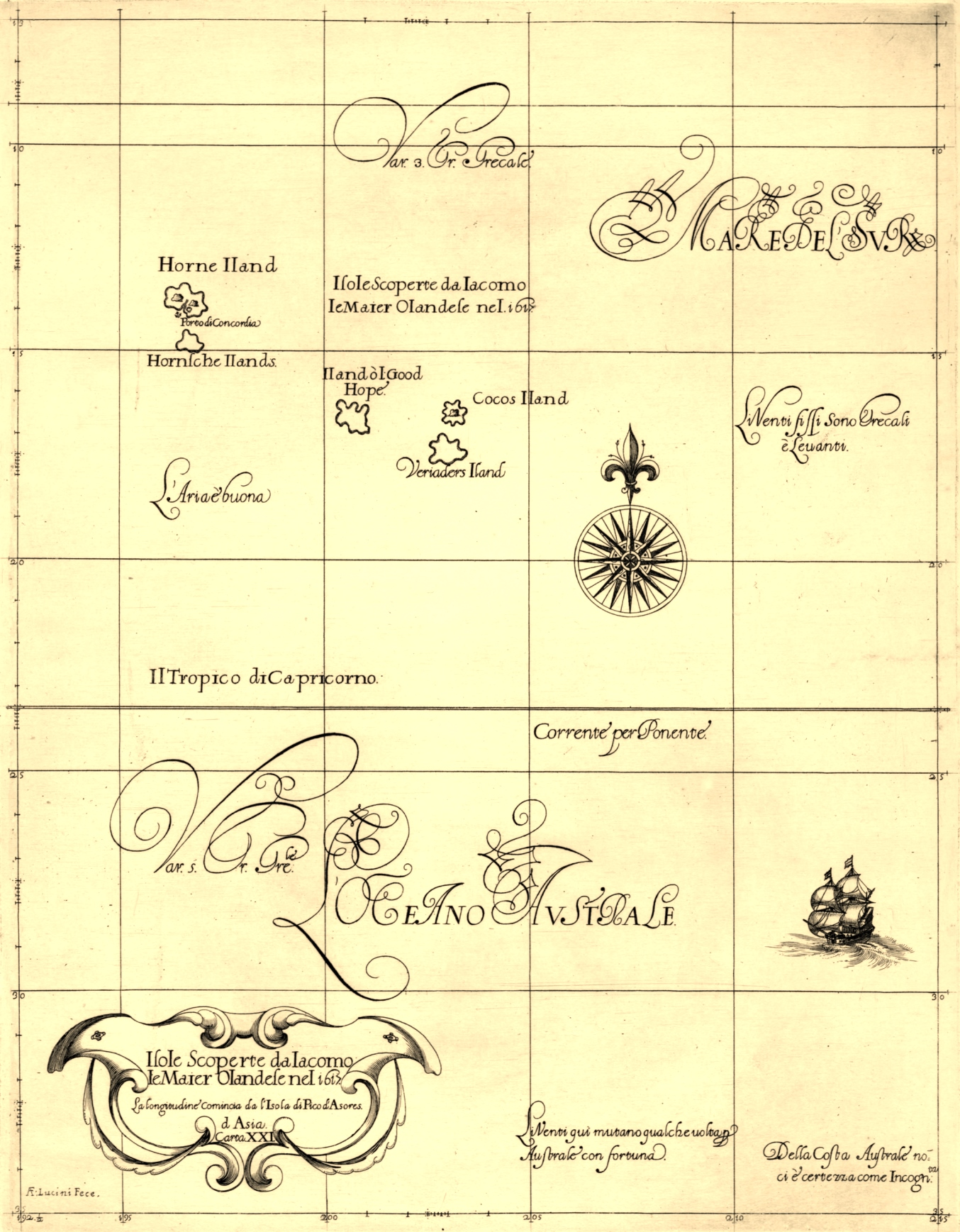
Futuna, Alofi, Niuafo'ou, Niuatoputapu and Tafahi drawn on a 1646 map by Robert Dudley. In 1616, Dutch explorers Le Maire and Schouten were the first Europeans to visit those islands.

== Geography ==
The islands lie at approximately 15° south latitude and 175° to 173° west longitude, approximately 600km north of the Tongan capital of Nukuʻalofa, 300 - 375 km northwest of Vavaʻu, and 320 - 470 km south or southwest of Samoa. Niuafoʻou is geographically separated from the other islands, lying 200km to the west. The total area of the islands is 71.69 km^{2} (27.68 sq mi).

=== Climate ===
The islands have a tropical climate, with a mean temperature of 27 °C (81 °F) and a mean annual rainfall of 2,453 mm (100 in) (Niuafoʻou) or 2,374 mm (90 in) (Niuatoputapu).

=== Geology ===
The islands are the peaks of undersea volcanoes, towering from the sea. Niuatoputapu and Tafahi lie on the Tofua volcanic arc, and are not active. Niuafoʻou lies at the center of the Niuafo'ou Plate and has erupted regularly since 1814. There are other volcanoes in this part of the Tofua chain which do not reach sea level, but form seamounts with between 1200 and 1500m of water above their peaks. This includes the Mata group, the Curacoa volcano, and the large submarine caldera Niuatahi.

== History ==
Historical population
Year	Pop.	±%
1976	2,328	—
1986	2,368	+1.7%
1996	2,018	−14.8%
2006	1,665	−17.5%
2011	1,282	−23.0%
2016	1,232	−3.9%
2021	1,150	−6.7%

Archaeological evidence shows the Niuas were settled by the Lapita culture. It was later part of the Tui Manu'a and Tuʻi Tonga Empires.

The Niua group was first encountered by Europeans in 1616 by Willem Schouten and Jacob Le Maire Cornelisz during their circumnavigation.

== Government ==
The islands are part of Tonga. Their people are represented in the legislative Assembly of Tonga via the Niua 17 electoral constituency, while their nobles are represented via the Niuas Nobles' constituency.
