= Ata language (disambiguation) =

Ata language is a language in Papua, New Guinea.

Ata may also refer to:

- Ata language (Austronesian), language spoken in Mabinay, Negros Oriental, Philippines
- Ata Manobo language, northeastern Mindanao, the Philippines
