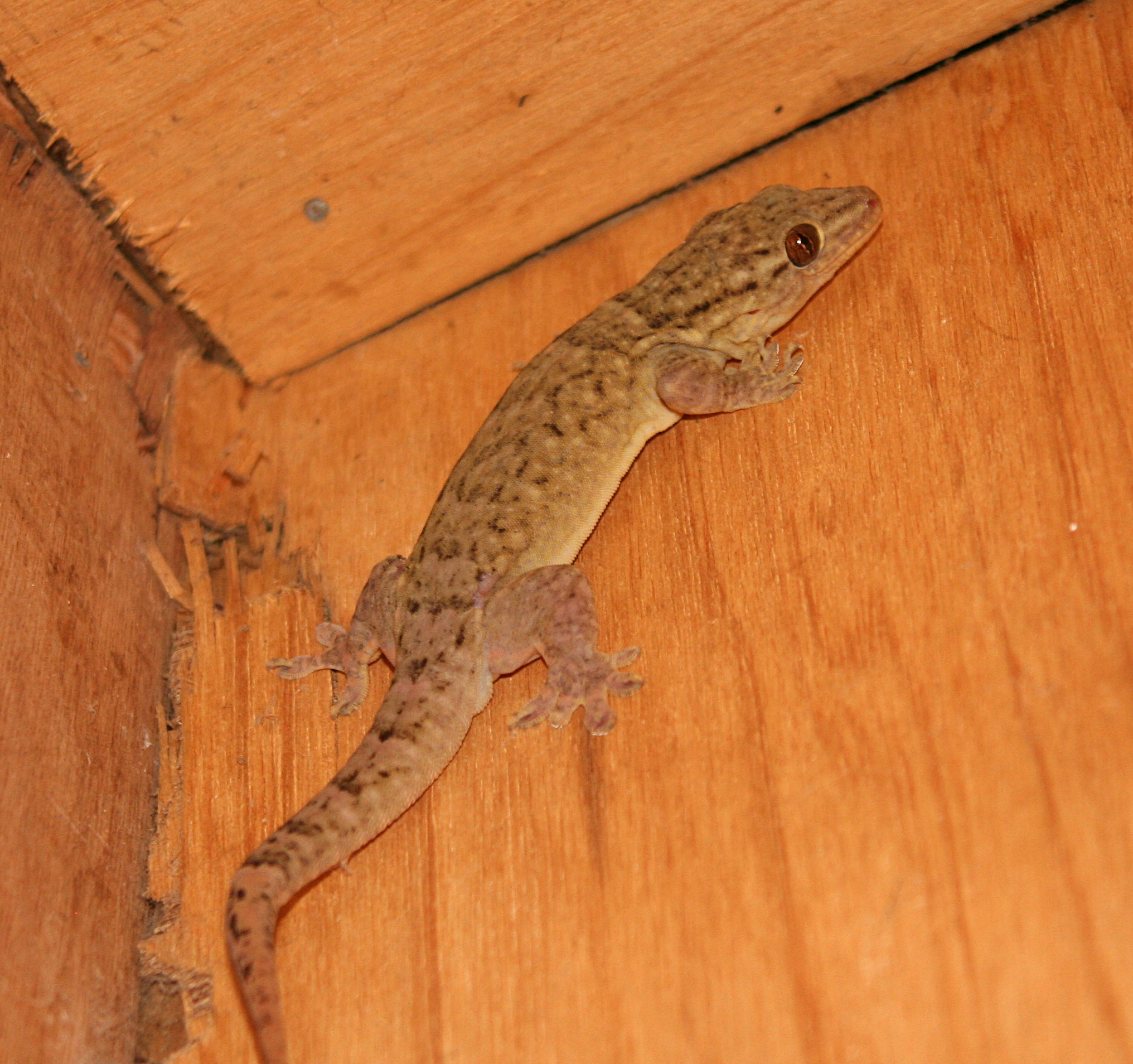

Scientific classification
- Kingdom: Animalia
- Phylum: Chordata
- Class: Reptilia
- Order: Squamata
- Suborder: Gekkota
- Family: Gekkonidae
- Genus: Gehyra
- Species: G. oceanica

Binomial name
- Gehyra oceanica (Lesson, 1830)

Synonyms
- Gecko oceanicus; Gehyra pacifica; Gehyra gularis; Gehyra oceania; Hemidactylus oualensis; Hemidactylus ovalensis; Peropus oualensis; Peropus oceanicus

= Gehyra oceanica =

Species of lizard

Gehyra oceanica, also known as the Oceania gecko or Pacific dtella, is a species of gecko in the genus Gehyra. The larger Gehyra vorax (voracious gecko) of Fiji, Vanuatu and New Guinea has sometimes been included in this species, but is now treated as distinct.

The species is native to New Guinea and a number of islands in Melanesia, Micronesia and Polynesia. It has also been widely introduced across the islands of the Pacific, reaching as far as the Marquesas Islands in Polynesia (where the species was first collected for science), although the extent to which the species has been introduced by human intervention is a matter of some debate. There are two apparent populations, a northern one in Micronesia and a southern one in Melanesia and Polynesia. There are also records of the species in New Zealand and Hawaii, but the species has apparently not become established there.

The species is generally arboreal and nocturnal. The diet includes insects and even smaller geckos. Some stomachs have also been found with seeds from fruit. It reproduces sexually, and unlike some other geckos in its genus its eggs are non-adhesive. The species shares communal nests of not more than twelve eggs in each, with only two eggs being laid by a female at a time. These eggs have a long incubation time, up to 115 days. It inhabits a range of habitats including plantations, gardens, and disturbed and undisturbed forests. The species will also feed inside human buildings, but is not described as commensal.
