= ATA Cruiser =

General information
- National origin: United States of America
- Manufacturer: Adams-Toman Aircraft co.

History
- Introduction date: 1928

The Adams-Toman Cruiser was a US-built civil utility aircraft of the 1920s. It was a three-seat, high-wing monoplane with an enclosed cabin, and possibly a variant of the Grays Harbor Activian. Only one of this model of aircraft was ever built.

== Specifications (Cruiser) ==
General characteristics

- Crew: 1
- Capacity: 2 passengers
- Length: 25 ft 0 in (7.62 m)
- Wingspan: 38 ft 3 in (11.66 m)
- Wing area: 299 sq ft (27.8 m^{2})
- Empty weight: 1,200 lb (544 kg)
- Gross weight: 2,000 lb (907 kg)
- Powerplant: 1 × Warner Scarab 7-cyl. air-cooled radial piston engine, 110 hp (82 kW)

Performance
