= ʻOhonua =

- Village
- Location within Tonga
- Coordinates: 21°20′31.7″S 174°57′21.1″W
- Country: Tonga
- District: ʻEua

Population (2021)
  - Total: 1,289
- Time zone: UTC+13:00

ʻOhonua is the capital of the ʻEua district in Tonga. It is located on the western side of the island. The population is 1,289.
