= Pangaimotu (Vavaʻu) =

Pangaimotu Island
- Island
- Interactive map of Pangaimotu Island
- Coordinates: 18°41′S 174°00′W
- Country: Tonga
- State: Vava'u
- Group: Vava'u Group
- Capital: Pangaimotu

Area
  - Total: 9.17 km^{2} (3.54 sq mi)

Population (2021)
  - Total: 696
  - Density: 75.9/km^{2} (197/sq mi)

Pangaimotu is an island in the Vava'u Group of Tonga. It is reachable by a 5-minute boat trip from Neiafu, the capital of Vava'u. The population is 696. Tonga's first woman pilot, Silva McLeod was born here.
