= ʻAtā =

Island in Tonga

Coordinates: 21°03′21″S 175°00′08″W

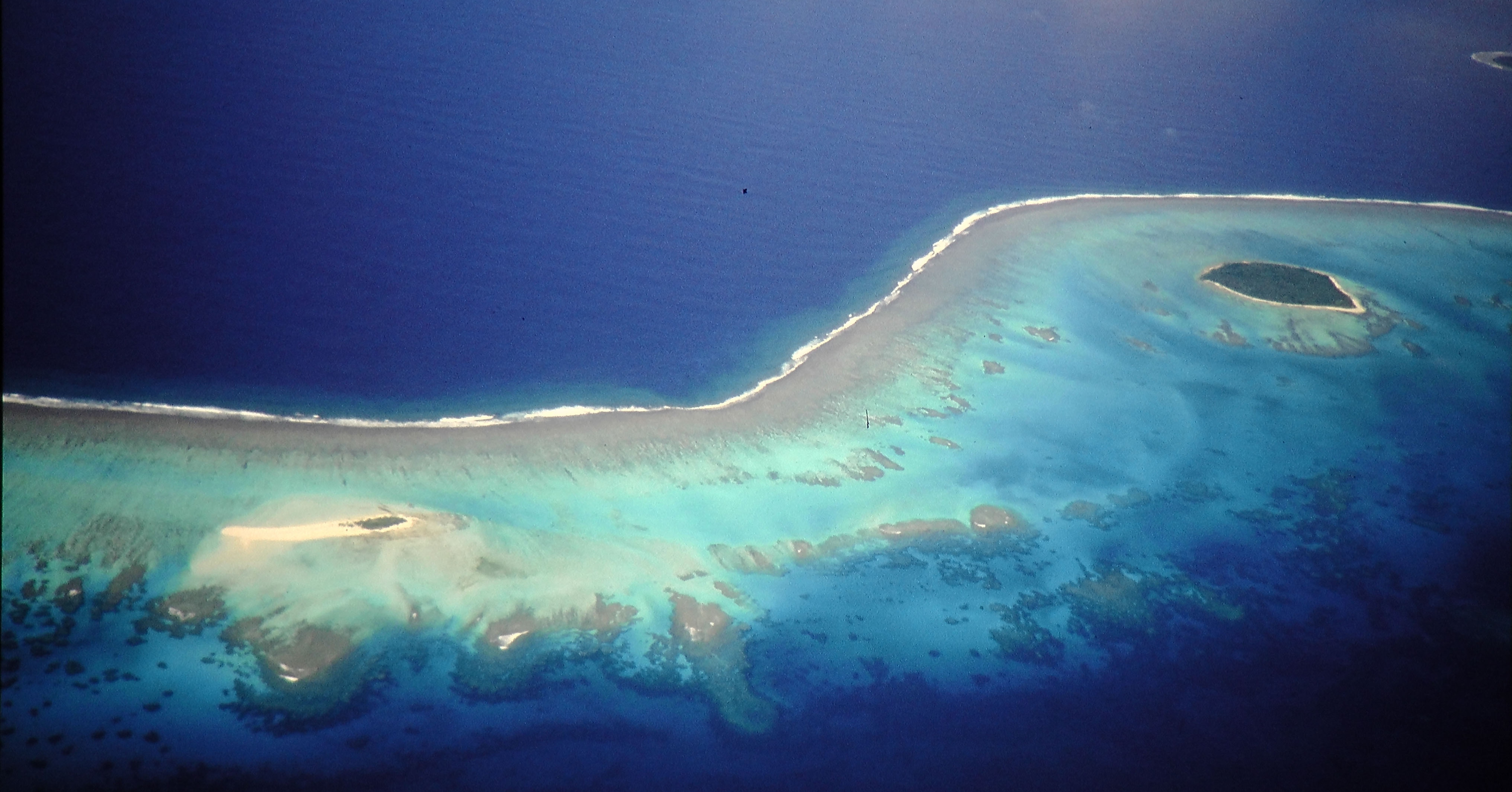
Aerial photograph of ʻAtā island, on the top right corner.

ʻAtā is a small island in the Tongatapu group of Tonga. It has been used since 2001 as an open prison for Tongan criminals, especially young people. In 2002, there were seven prisoners on the island, who grew yams, coconuts, manioc, and bananas to pay for their expenses.
