= Uonukuhahake =

Island in Lifuka district, in the Ha'apai islands of Tonga

Coordinates: 19°57′57″S 174°28′56″W

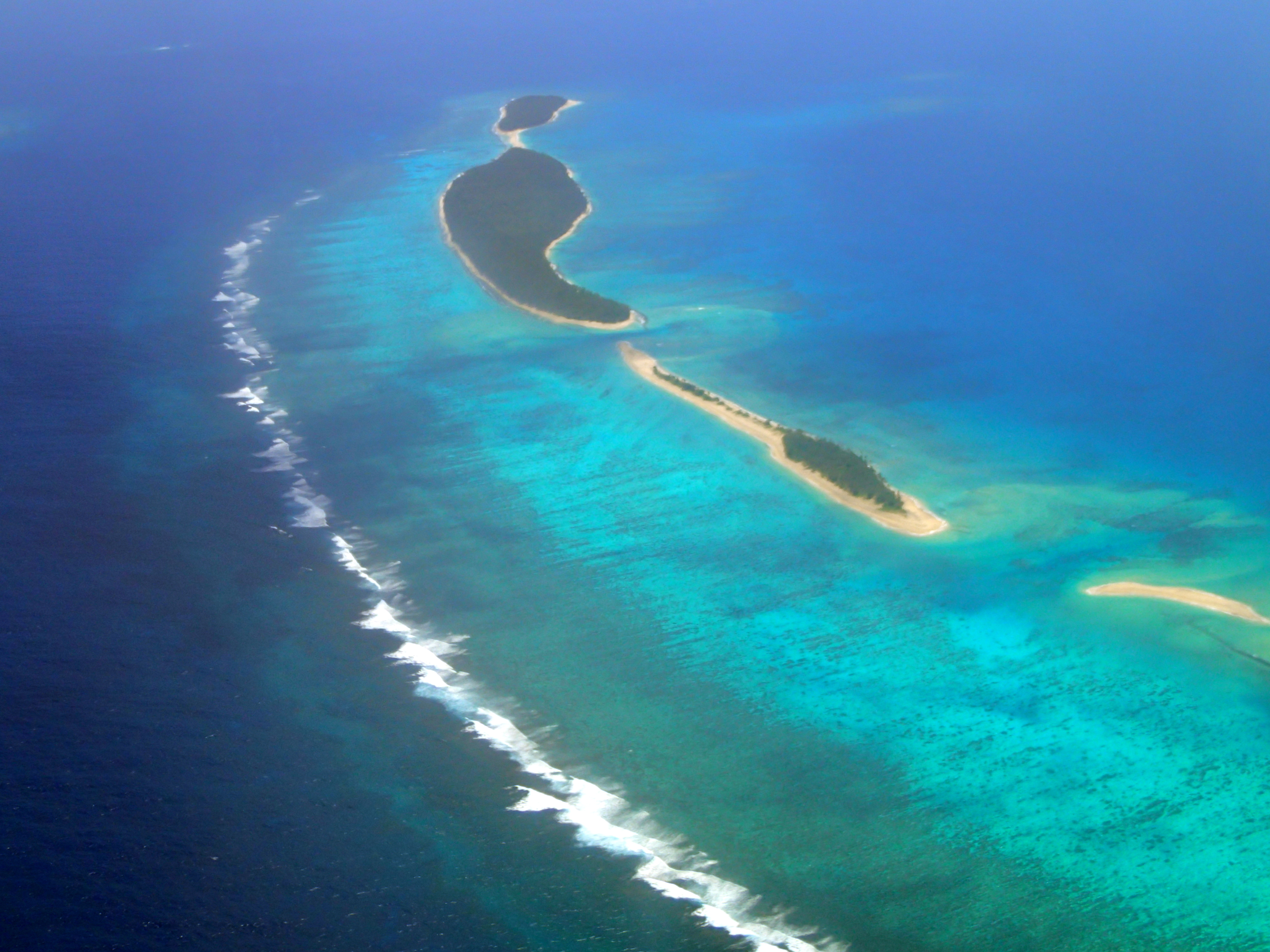
Uonukuhahake (the islet in the middle), with Uonukuhihifo (top), Tofanga (bottom) and part of Sand Cay

Uonukuhahake is an island in Lifuka district, in the Ha'apai islands of Tonga.

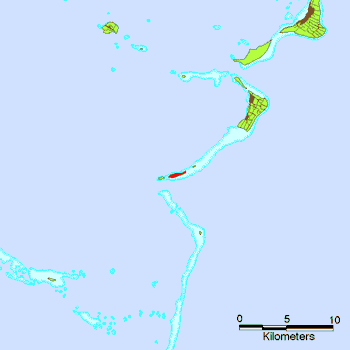
Uonukuhahake

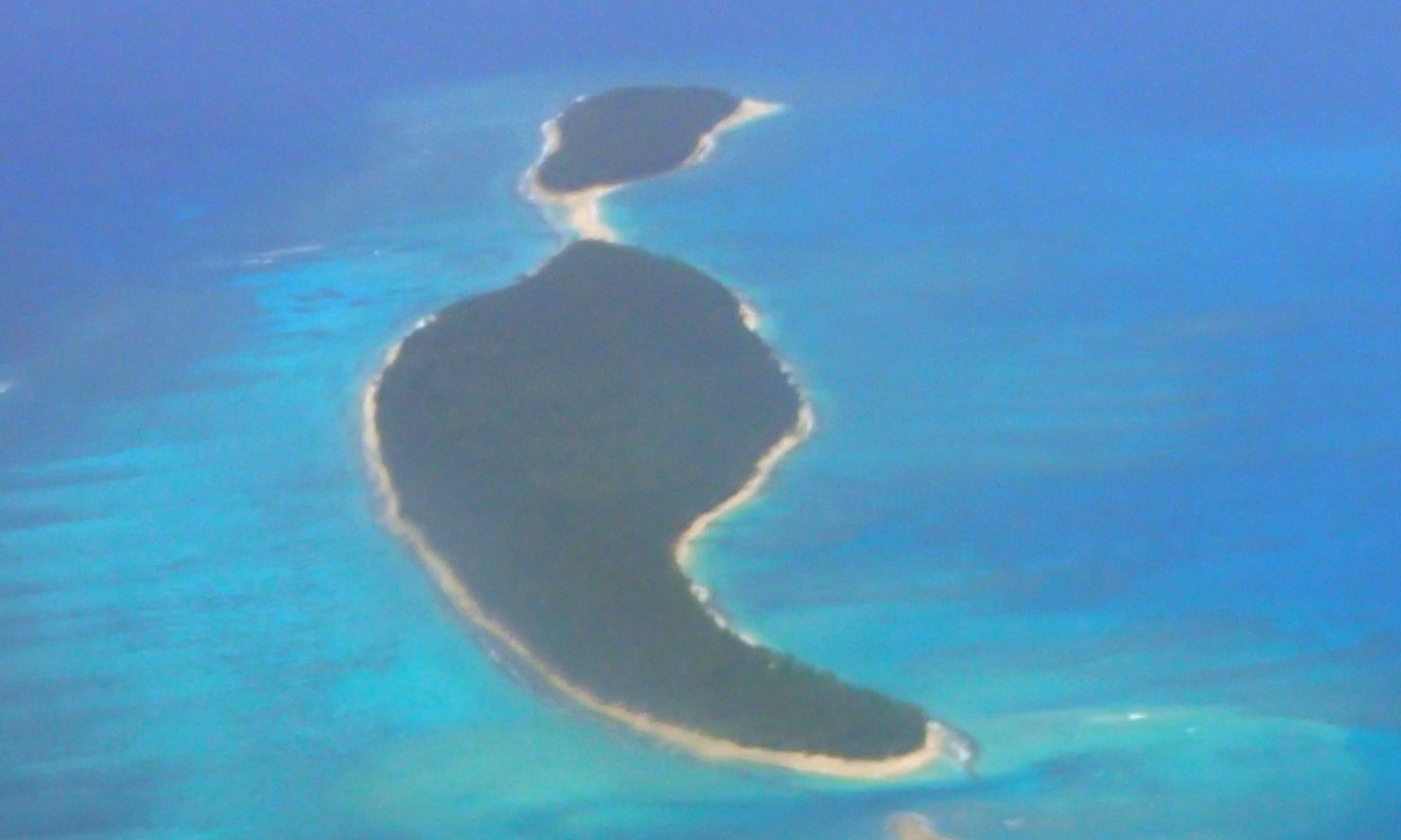
Close-up of Uonukuhihifo and Uonukuhahake
