= Uonukuhihifo =

Island in Tonga

Coordinates: 19.969°S 174.495°W

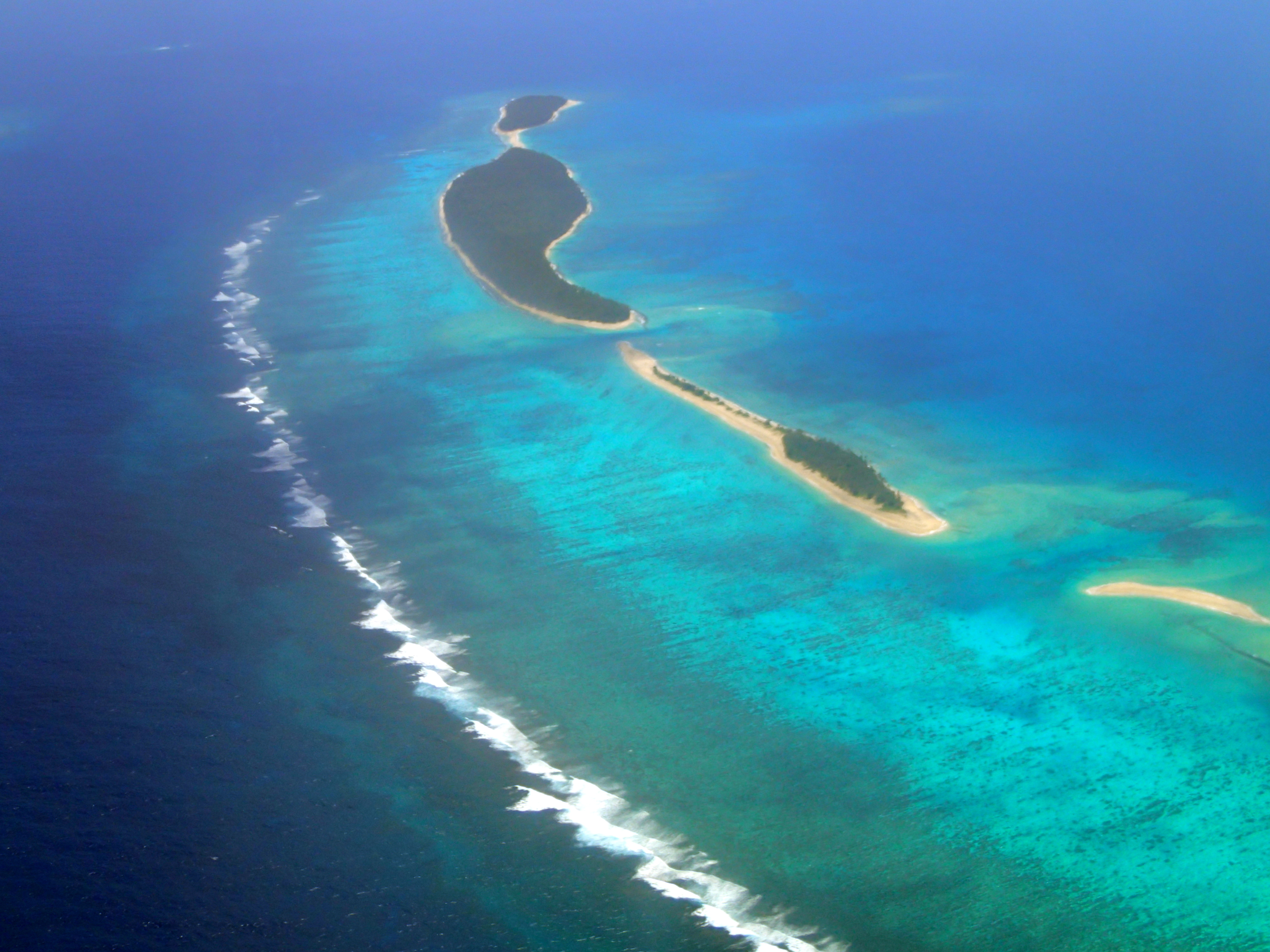
Uonukuhihifo is the islet at the top; next to it are Uonukuhahake, Tofanga and Sand Cay

Uonukuhihifo is an islet which belongs to Uonukuhahake island, Tonga. It is located within the Ha'apai Group.

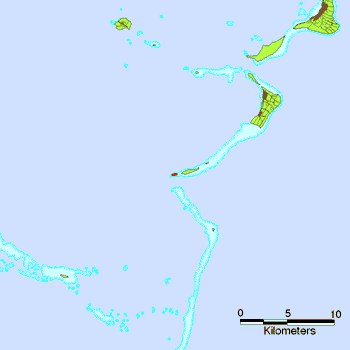
Uonukuhihifo

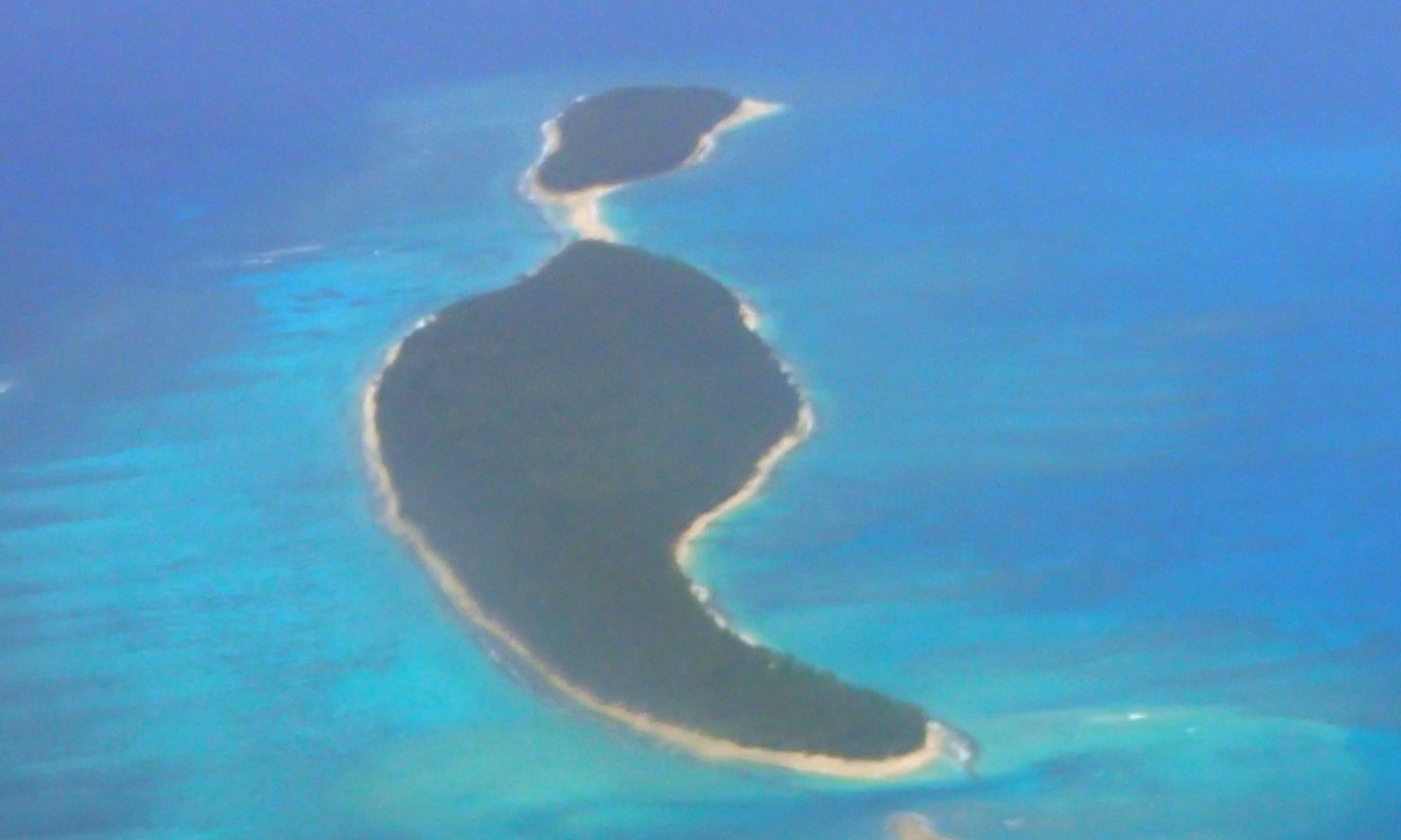
Close-up of Uonukuhihifo and Uonukuhahake

== See also ==
- List of islands and towns in Tonga
