= Tofanga =

Islet in Tonga

Coordinates: 19.958°S 174.462°W

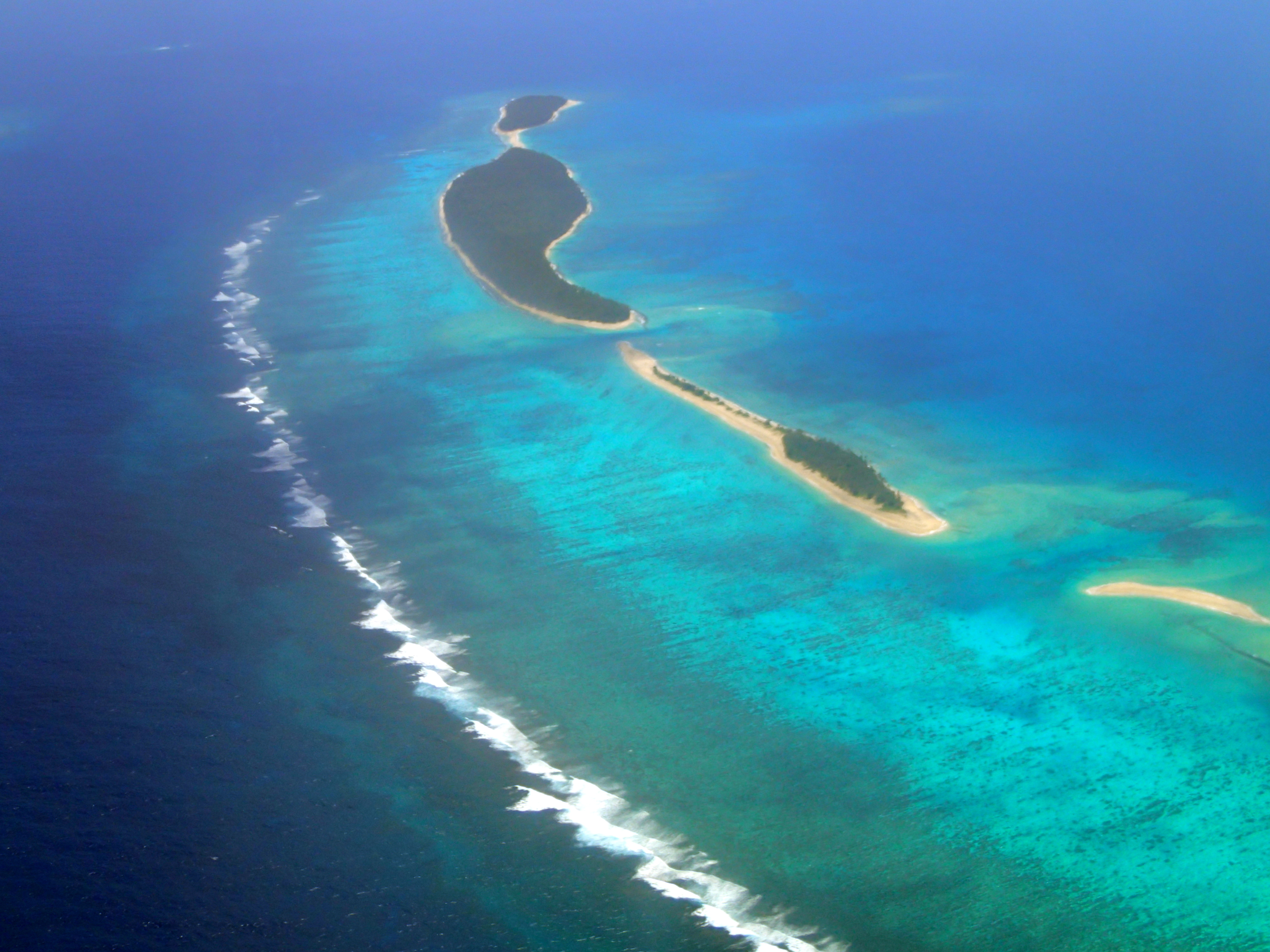
Tofanga, fully visible at the bottom, next to Uonukuhihifo and Uonukuhahake

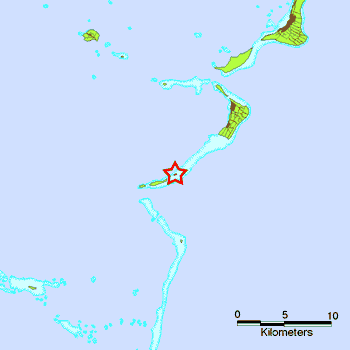
Tofanga

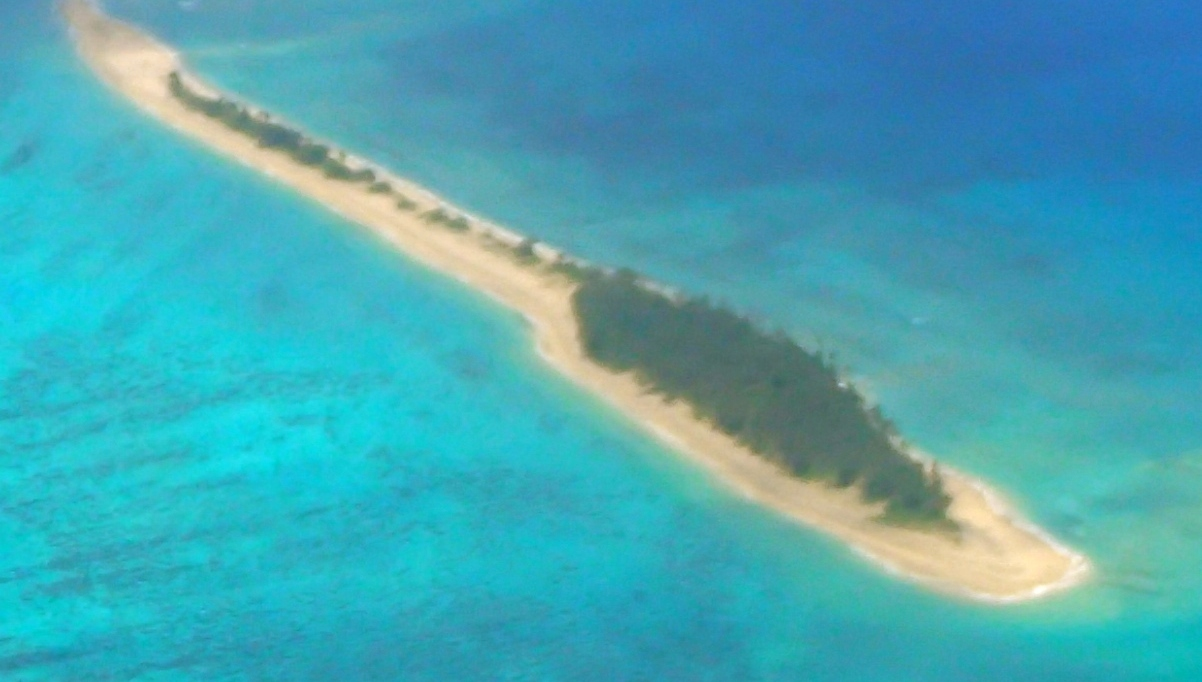
Close-up of Tofanga

Tofanga is an islet which belongs to Uonukuhahake island, Tonga. It is located within the Ha'apai Group.

== See also ==
- List of islands and towns in Tonga
