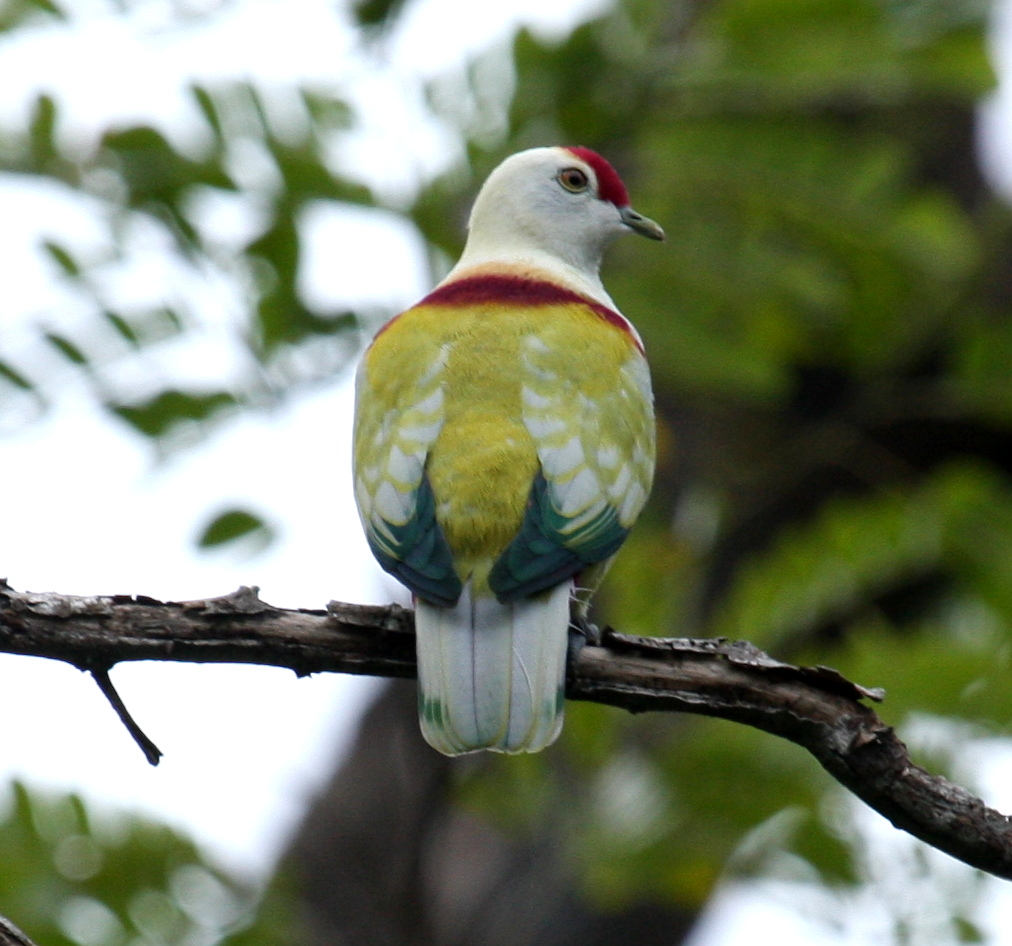
- Male
- Female

Conservation status
- Least Concern (IUCN 3.1)

Scientific classification
- Kingdom: Animalia
- Phylum: Chordata
- Class: Aves
- Order: Columbiformes
- Family: Columbidae
- Genus: Ptilinopus
- Species: P. perousii

Binomial name
- Ptilinopus perousii Peale, 1849

Subspecies
- P. p. perousii; P. p. mariae

= Many-coloured fruit dove =

Many-coloured fruit dove Temporal range: Quaternary

Species of bird in the Columbidae family

The many-colored fruit dove (Ptilinopus perousii), also known as the manuma in Samoan, is a bird in the pigeon and dove family, Columbidae. It is native to the southwest Pacific Ocean, where it inhabits the canopies of subtropical or tropical moist lowland forests across Fiji, Tonga, and the Samoan Islands. It is sexually dimorphic, with the male featuring a pale yellow-white body with a rose-red crown and a crimson bar across his back, and the female being mostly green with a red crown and variable undertail coverts.

it travels in small flocks to feed high in the upper canopy, primarily targeting banyan figs. The species constructs flimsy, small twig platforms for nests, where females lay a single white egg. The Latin name comes from the name Captain Jean Francois de Galaup Comte de la Pérouse of the French navy, who explored the Pacific and is believed to be the first Westerner who encountered the bird. It is heavily tied to traditional Polynesian myths and historical chiefly status, and was historically hunted using traditional stone pigeon mounds and show a centralized royal leadership in Tonga and a decentralized regional leadership in Samoa. The bird is currently evaluated as a species of Least Concern by the IUCN, despite experiencing localized population declines in American Samoa due to habitat loss and cyclones.

== Description ==
It is a small dove, 23 cm (9.1 in) in length. Adults weigh about 90 g (3.2 oz). The bird is sexually dimorphic, with both male and female showing different contrast of colors. The males have a pale yellow-white body. It features a bright red crown on its head and a broad red bar across its back. These bold colours contrast with its lighter feathers, making the male easy to identify in the trees. The female is green with a darker back. The head is also grayer as well as the breast. The crown is red, while the undertail-coverts are red in Samoan birds and yellow in birds from Fiji and Tonga. The green feathers help it stay hidden in dense foliage. The female is said to look like purple-capped fruit dove, except that there is no yellow band. They have grey on the bottom while green on top. It only has a crimson corona unlike the male. The wings of both male and female are small. They have a bill made for plucking soft fruit, and weigh about 110 g (3.9 oz), making them one of the smallest of the pigeon family.

== Distribution and habitat ==
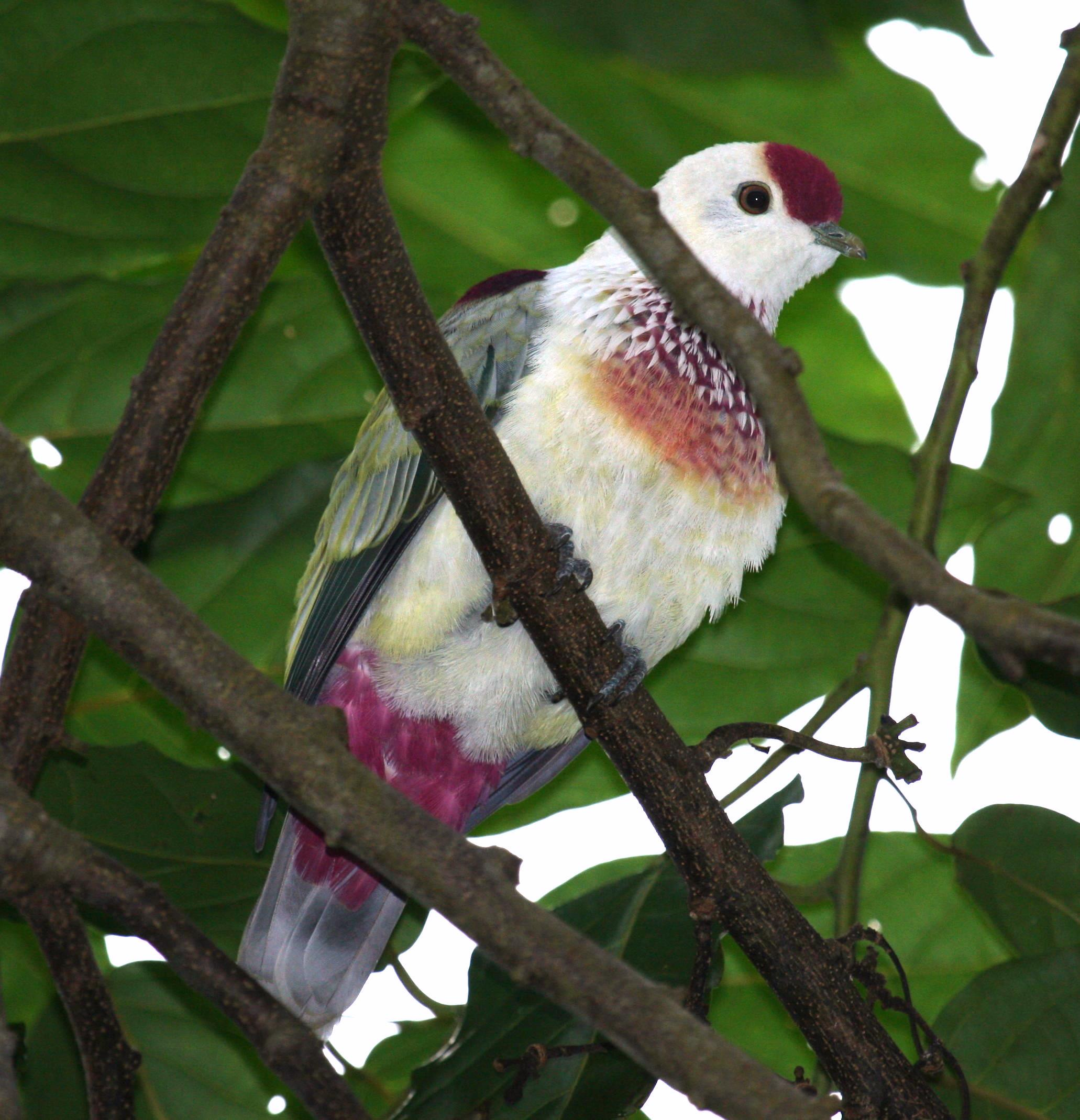
Male, Matei, Taveuni, Fiji Isles

The many-colored fruit dove is found across many Polynesian islands with a range of 660,000 square kilometres (250,000 sq mi). They can be found in lowland subtropical and tropical broadleaf forests, where they are found in the canopies. They can also be found in urban areas, and on plantations, parks, and gardens. The manuma's fossil range is from 0.12 million years ago to today, exclusively in the quaternary. The many-colored fruit dove has a wide distribution in the Pacific, yet its population density varies based on food availability. The island distribution leaves the species highly vulnerable to habitat loss and introduced predators.

== Behaviour and ecology ==
=== Diet ===
The many-coloured fruit dove is a frugivore. It forages the canopies of trees in search figs On Samoa and American Samoa it is mostly the banyan. This strict diet keeps the two fig species in check; however, any decline in the amount of figs may be a disaster for the many-coloured fruit dove. On Fiji and Tonga, many-coloured fruit doves are known to eat the fruit of ylang ylang (Cananga odorata), bishop wood (Bischofia javanica), and māgele (Trema cannabina).

=== Social ===
Many-coloured fruit doves are often found in small flocks, which normally have more males than females. These birds can be alone or have pairs. They are known for its soft, low-pitched calls, consisting of whistles and coos which is optimized for communication with mates or claiming of territory.

=== Breeding ===
Breeding relies on weather conditions and seasonal fruit availability. To protect the baby, they make platforms of twigs tucked into the high canopy forks of tree branches. This keeps the nest from predators while keeping the birds close to food sources. Only one white egg is layer by the female for one breeding attempt. The incubation are shared by both parents and last approximately 2 weeks. Upon hatching, The chick relies on parents, as well as being blind and having no feathers. Parents feed the chicks crop-milk This is a trait shared with other pigeons and doves. After 2 weeks of staying in the nest, It learns how to fly and forage under the supervision of parents. Breeding can happen annually, especially in seasons of abundant fruit. It is heavily influenced by habitat disturbance and predators.

== Taxonomy ==
The many-coloured fruit dove is in the Columbidae family with other doves and pigeons. It a fruit dove belonging to genus Ptilinopus. However, it is very far from most other doves and has no close relatives due to it being endemic to the South Pacific islands. It is a colorful dove that eats fruit, hence the name. The Samoan name manuma means "shy bird" and comes from the Samoan words manu, meaning "bird" and mā, meaning "bashful" or "to be easily ashamed". The Latin name comes from the name Captain Jean Francois de Galaup Comte de la Pérouse of the French navy, who explored the Pacific and is believed to be the first Westerner who encountered the bird. The two subspecies are Ptilinopus perousii mariae and P. p. perousii. Nominate P. p. perousii is found on Samoa (Savai'i, Upolu, Tutuila, Ofu, and Tau), and subspecies P. p. mariae is found in Fiji and Tonga.

== Description to Western science ==
The many-coloured fruit dove is unusual taxonomically because its first encounter with Western naturalists happened decades before its formal scientific description. Additionally, the bird already had a name, a place in Samoan society, and a cultural meaning for the Indigenous people of the Samoan Islands long before an American naturalist gave it a Latin name. Anthropologist Serge Tcherkézoff identifies the bird encountered by the French in 1787 as the Samoan manumā, later named Ptilinopus perousii by the naturalist of the United States Exploring Expedition.

=== La Pérouse Expedition (c. 1787) ===
In December 1787, the French explorer Jean-François de Galaup, comte de La Pérouse, arrived in the Samoan Islands. La Pérouse commanded the French expedition aboard the frigate La Boussole, accompanied by L'Astrolabe, which was commanded by Paul-Antoine Fleuriot de Langle.

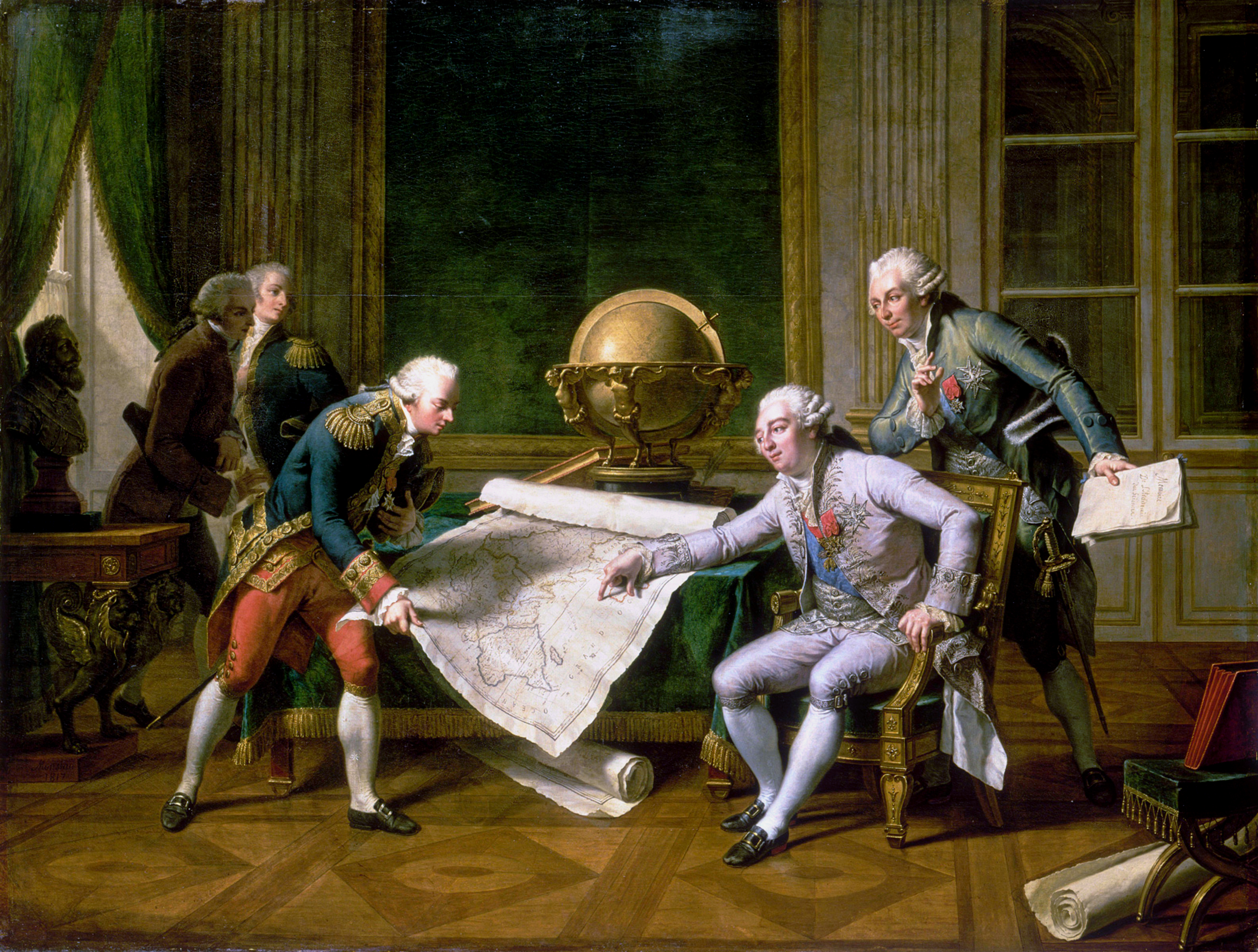
Louis XVI, seated at right, giving La Pérouse his instructions on 29 June 1785. Louis XVI Giving His Instructions to La Pérouse by Nicolas-André Monsiau (1817). (Château de Versailles)

King Louis XVI had commissioned the expedition in 1785 as a voyage of scientific discovery around the world. Inspired by the expeditions of men like James Cook and the general sensibilities of the Age of Scientific Exploration, La Pérouse's expedition carried scientists and artists and was equipped with scientific instruments and a library of reference works. Its scientists were expected to study the geography and natural history of the new places they discovered, and were also expected to carefully record the people they encountered and their observed customs.

This was a time in broader Western European cultures-- immediately following the Age of Discovery and the Age of Enlightenment-- when studies of biology, anthropology, geography, and taxonomy were all classified as the generalised "natural history". Because of this grouping of studies, La Pérouse's instructions from the French Government specifically directed him to observe the inhabitants of the places he visited, to interact with them as much as possible, and to collect and classify objects used by the people he encountered.

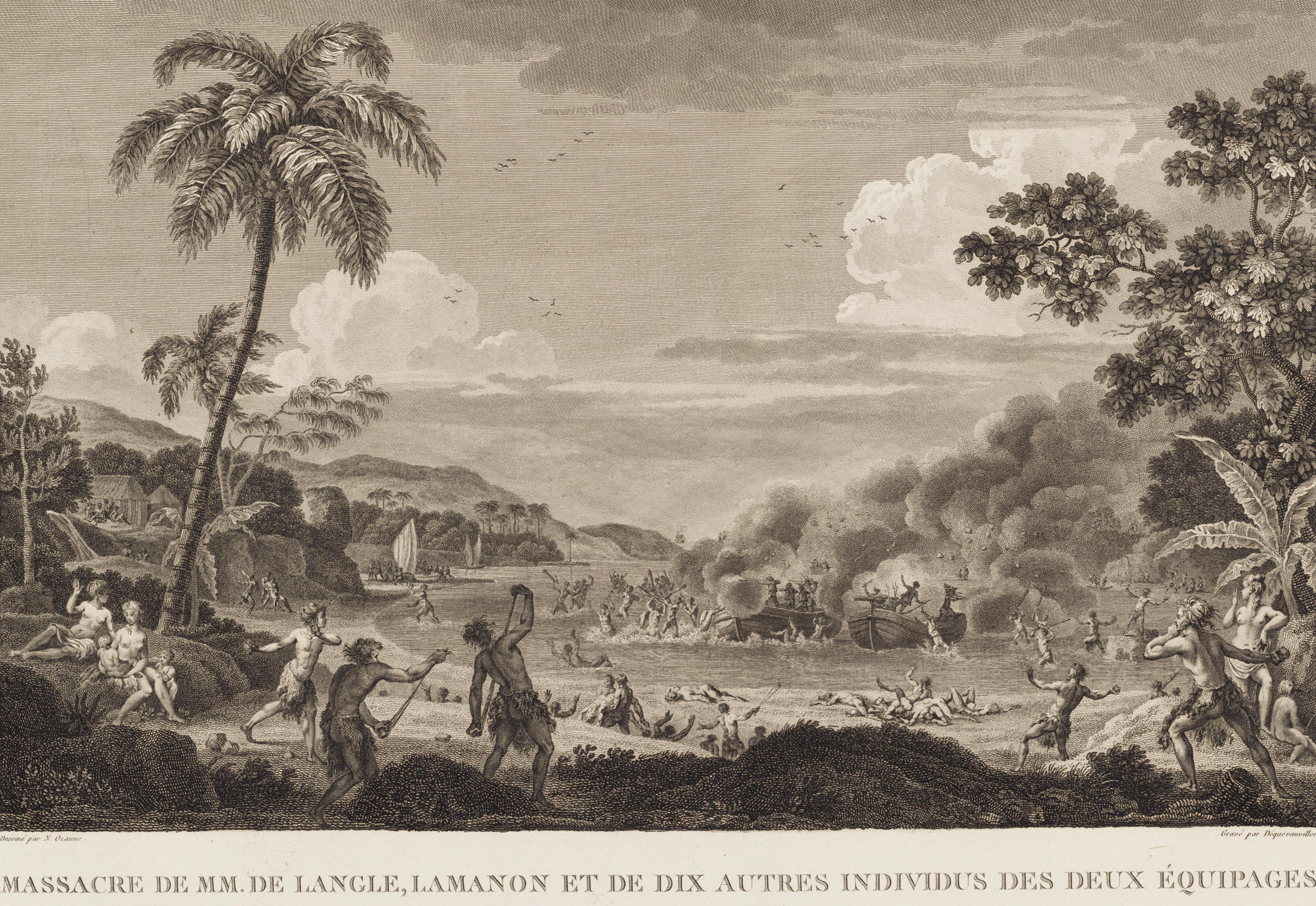
Engraving of the death of Commander de Langle and 12 men at Massacre Bay (c. 1787). Engraving titled "Massacre of De Langle, Lemanon & Ten Others of the Two Crews", published in the atlas Charts and Plates to La Pérouse's Voyage around the World, published around 1797.

The expedition arrived in what they called the Navigator Islands on December 6th, 1787. They stopped at an island they called Maouna on the same day, and made contact with the indigenous Samoans almost immediately. On December 11th, 1787, shortly before the expedition planned to depart from Samoa, a party commanded by de Langle went ashore in search of fresh water. A violent confrontation followed, and de Langle, Robert de Lamanon, and 10 other members of the expedition were killed at Massacre Bay. Before this violence, however, the French explorers had recorded peaceful exchanges with Samoans. La Pérouse's posthumously-published account describes Samoan canoes approaching the ships and bringing provisions and other objects for exchange.

Among the objects the Samoans brought aboard was something that fascinated La Pérouse: a remarkably colourful and tame little dove. His published account describes it as an "exceptionally charming turtle dove" that was "tame enough to eat from a person's hand and even from the mouth". La Pérouse's detailed description was compared with the known characteristics of Ptilinopus perousii and modern anthropologists and historians have identified the dove as the Samoan manumā, also known in historical sources by other names.

To La Pérouse, the dove was a remarkable and unique specimen. To the Samoans who presented it, it appears to have carried a different significance. Anthropologists believe that the manumā was associated with high chiefs and was kept as a special or sacred pet rather than being treated as food.

La Pérouse himself did not give the bird the scientific name Ptilinopus perousii. That came roughly half a century later, when American naturalist Titian Ramsay Peale described the species as part of the United States Exploring Expedition.

=== United States Exploring Expedition (c. 1839) ===
Copper plate engraving of Ptilinopus perousii (listed as "Ptilouopus Perousei") published in 1858 by J. B. Lippincott & Co. Original drawing was created by American naturalist Titian Ramsay Peale based on his observations during the United States Exploring Expedition. In 1858, John Cassin prepared the ornithological volume of the expedition's publication, and New York engraver Robert Hinshelwood produced this copper printing plate from Peale's drawing.

The United States Exploring Expedition reached the Samoan Islands in October 1839. Authorised by an act of Congress in 1836, the expedition was commanded by Lieutenant Charles Wilkes of the United States Navy. The expedition was intended to survey and explore the Pacific Ocean and South Seas, a region that was becoming increasingly important to American traders and whalers. Its scientific corps included Peale and another naturalist Charles Pickering, conchologist Joseph Pitty Couthouy, mineralogist James Dwight Dana, botanists William Rich and William Dunlop Brackenridge, and linguist Horatio Hale. Artists Joseph Drayton and Alfred Thomas Agate also accompanied the expedition.

By the time of the United States Exploring Expedition, natural history had become an increasingly systematic field of study. The expedition's scientists collected specimens, artifacts, and observations throughout the voyage, and the material was later organized into scientific publications, and museum collections. Peale was particularly well suited to this work: he has been described as an experienced field naturalist, taxidermist, illustrator, and collector. During the expedition, he collected thousands of specimens, including 2,150 birds, and produced numerous drawings and paintings. Peale also produced the original drawing that became the basis for the bird's published illustration.

One of the birds collected during the expedition was the many-coloured fruit dove. The Smithsonian National Museum of Natural History's birds division of Vertebrate Zoology identifies the original type specimen as an adult male collected on Upolu, Samoa, under the expedition field number 551. The specimen is now catalogued as Smithsonian Collections USNM Number A14828. The catalogue identifies "Upolu" as the restricted type locality and notes that this was the only specimen of the original series from that locality.

=== Formal description (c. 1849) ===
Modern taxonomic authorities cite the species as Ptilinopus perousii. (Peale, TR, 1849) The formal name appeared in Peale's 1849 report on the mammals and birds of the United States Exploring Expedition as Ptilinopus perousii. However, the volume itself bears the date 1848, which is why some references give 1848 as its imprint year.

The name perousii was chosen in reference to La Pérouse. The two European-American expeditions to Samoa were not affiliated, but accounts of La Pérouse's voyage had entered the published literature long before the United States Exploring Expedition set sail.

The account of the expedition, edited together by Louis Marie de Milet de Mureau, was submitted to the National Assembly on 22 April, 1791. The French government published Voyage de La Pérouse autour du monde in 1791, based on the La Pérouse's expedition's surviving records, and the work was subsequently reprinted and translated into several languages. It was also published in English under the title A Voyage Round the World- In The Years 1785, 1786, 1787 and 1788. La Pérouse's entire journey was told in three volumes to English-readers (Volume I, Volume II, and Volume III) which were available by 1798.

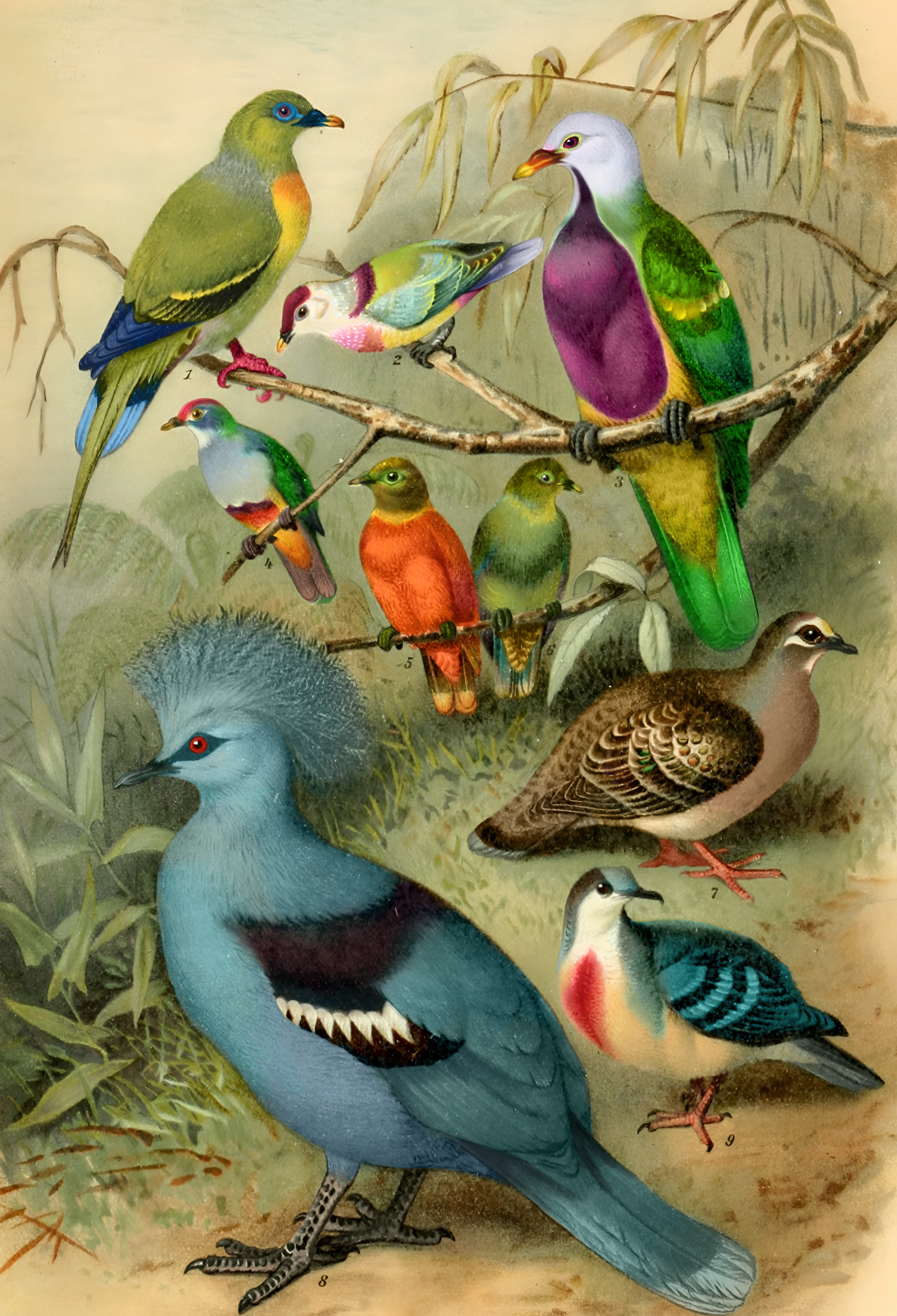
Ptilinopus perousii (listed as Ptilinopus peyrousei) featured as No. 2 in a chromolithograph plate of "Tauben" from the 1898 edition of Brockhaus's Conversation Lexicon.

While the surviving scholarship does not provide a separate document showing exactly when Peale first read La Pérouse's account or when he decided personally to use the name, it was considered fairly expected that 19th-century naturalists would be familiar with the previous European explorers that had visited the locations before them, and naming species in their honor was not uncommon. Charles Darwin, for example, had access to Voyage de La Pérouse autour du monde while aboard HMS Beagle.

Peale also produced the original drawing that became the basis for the bird's published illustration. In 1858, John Cassin prepared the ornithological volume of the expedition's publication, and New York engraver Robert Hinshelwood produced a copper printing plate from Peale's drawing. The Smithsonian's National Museum of American History preserves that original plate. In the plate, the bird is identified as "Ptilonopus perousei", the historical spelling used at the time. The plate was published as Plate No. 33 in Volume VIII, Mammalogy and Ornithology, in 1858, produced by Philadelphian printers J. B. Lippincott & Co.

== Indigenous names and traditional uses ==
In Samoa, the bird was known as manumā, a Samoan name that is generally understood as meaning a "shy bird". It was also considered too small to be a desirable hunting target compared with larger pigeons such as the Pacific imperial pigeon.

Modern ethnobiological research shows that Samoan names for the bird have varied between islands and through time, and that the term "manumā" has sometimes also been applied to the tooth-billed pigeon. The National Park Service, however, identifies manumā as specifically the Indigenous name for the many-coloured fruit dove in American Samoa.

The historical evidence examined by anthropologist Serge Tcherkézoff suggests that the manumā occupied a special position in traditional Samoan chiefly culture. Based on the context and implications of the exchange of the dove from the Indigenous Samoans to the La Pérouse Expedition in 1787, Tcherkézoff connects the presentation of the manumā with a pre-colonial Samoan spiritual belief that such animals could represent a formative link between the sacred (the spirits, gods, and supernatural figures) and humans.

The importance of the manumā and other pigeons still survives in contemporary West Polynesian language traditions. A large body of muāgagana, or metaphorical proverbs, and alagaʻupu, or proverbial expressions, draws on the behaviour, capture, and preservation of these doves. They continue to have a place in modern ceremonial speeches, or lauga, delivered by talking chiefs, or tulafale.

== Cultural significance ==
The exchange of a hand-reared many-coloured fruit dove between the Indigenous Samoans and the La Pérouse Expedition in 1787 represented far more than the giving of a gift to the Samoans. The cultural importance of the manumā can also be seen in Fa'asamoa, or Samoan custom. A domesticated bird of this species was more than a pet or an ordinary source of food, and the bird itself symbolised an important aspect of Samoan society.

It was part of a larger social and religious system that directly connected chiefs, or matai, with the ancestor spirits that legitimized their spiritual and political authority. In the traditional West Polynesian view of the world, birds in general were not seen only as sources of food. They could be understood as ata (meaning physical manifestations, shadows, or earthly connections) to aitu (the spirits of ancestors and deities) and to the supreme sky god, Tagaloaalagi.

Within this belief system, offering an unusually tame manumā to the La Pérouse Expedition may have followed a highly ritual tradition rather than being an ordinary commercial exchange. It is unclear what became of the manumā that La Perouse received, but based on the conflict between the French explorers and the Samoans that would follow, the French likely did not understand the cultural importance of the exchange. In his own account, La Perouse recorded that he shot many of the pigeons being presented to him as a show of force. While it is unclear if the manumā that the Samoans presented him was one of the birds that La Perouse and his men shot, the French expeditions' collective treatment of the birds on an island that valued them as more than just game animals may have contributed to the violence between the Samoans and the French that followed.

In the Samoan myth known as Sina and the Birds, the bird appears as one of the creatures that the mythological figure Sina interacts with. In repayment for the bird helping her in her search for her missing husband, Sina gave the bird part of her attire, explaining the white parts of the birds' coloration. In another version of the myth, Sina is evading her enemies and the manumā warns her that they are still following her, and it is gratitude for this warning that causes Sina to give the bird her white garment.

In both versions of the myth, Sina interacts with several birds that were culturally important to the Samoans, and how they feature in the myth can be connected to how the Samoans viewed each bird culturally. Other birds mentioned in the myth include the manuali’i (Australasian swamphen), the lupe (Pacific imperial pigeon), the manutagi (Crimson-crowned fruit dove), and- in some versions of the myth- the sega (Blue-crowned lorikeet). Notably, only the lupe refuses to help Sina and receives a punishment accordingly, and the lupe was commonly consumed by the Samoans. The many-colored fruit dove is recorded as living high in the canopy, that it is helpful the Sina and wants to help her seek justice and safety, and that its bright plumage set it apart from other birds in the forest.

In pre-colonial West Polynesian society, an exceptionally tame, hand-raised bird, known as lata, could demonstrate the spiritual power, or mana, of a high-ranking chief. Elite chiefs sometimes kept small, brightly colored fruit doves as well as "decoy birds" for pigeon hunting inside their residences as sacred pets. Lata birds in the pigeon and dove family in these households would perch on unique perches called tūlā. In this setting, the birds could act as symbols of political legitimacy and a chief's proper relationship with the spiritual world.

Because of this status, strict rules about rank, dress, food, and social behavior, including dietary restrictions (known as sā) governed access to these birds. Rarer birds, such as the manumā, that lived high in the forest canopy, were associated with the highest levels of the chiefly system.

=== "Pigeon-netting" mounds ===
The importance of pigeons and doves was also preserved in the archaeological and ethnographic record of West Polynesia. Across the region, archaeologists have identified highly specialized stone structures known as "star mounds", a name based on their distinctive projecting arms. In Samoa, complex chiefdoms built large earthen and stone platforms called tia seu lupe, meaning "mounds for netting pigeons", between about 1000 and 1500 CE. These structures required organised labour at the village level and show how important pigeon hunting had become within Samoan society. Archaeological excavations and later analysis indicate that the mounds were used as ritual spaces for elite hunting and seasonal competitions over forest resources. Large pigeons, such as the lupe, were the main targets and were used in widespread ceremonial feasting, though they were also considered sacred and "decoy pigeons" of the lupe were also kept by elite Samoan chiefs. Smaller fruit-eating birds such as the manumā were also captured and became part of these elite networks.

Similar structures existed in Tonga, where they were known as sia heu lupe. The practice of ritual pigeon hunting formed part of a broader West Polynesian system in which access to birds could be connected to prestige, social status, and political power.

The Samoan and Tongan pigeon-netting structures were not identical, however, and their different designs reflect different forms of political organization. In Samoa, the tia seu lupe were complex and relatively decentralized "star mounds". They were built with stone-faced retaining walls and usually had between one and eleven projections (or arms), though most commonly, the structures had 4-8 arms. Archaeological work on Manono Island has also documented stone retaining walls around the mounds there. During pigeon-catching, hunters were positioned around the mound, probably one at each projection, where they sat concealed in temporary brush huts (called fale seu) while using long nets to catch pigeons. Inside the huts, pigeon hunters would sit on specific stools called nōfoaga seu lupe.

The Tongan sia heu lupe had a very different design. These structures were much larger and more uniform, usually taking the form of massive, flat-topped circular or oval platforms that could reach about five meters in height. Unlike the Samoan mounds, they did not have projecting arms. Their design supported large-scale, coordinated pigeon netting carried out under centralized royal control. The contrast between the two types of structures reflects different paths toward political centralization in Samoa and Tonga.

== Status ==
While not listed as threatened or endangered by the International Union for Conservation of Nature (IUCN), their population is in decline in American Samoa. The justification of the conservation status is that the decline is not extreme enough and the restricted area is not small enough for the vulnerability status. Despite it status, the Many Colored fruit dove faces threats from agricultural expansion, loss of forest, and urban expansion. The many-coloured fruit dove's chief food source, the banyan fruit, are also in decline due to deforestation and their susceptibility to storm damage. In the 1990s, Cyclone Val and Cyclone Ofa killed or damaged a number of banyan trees, or otherwise stripped them bare of leaves and fruit. Hunting is another cause of the bird's decline on Tutuila. Hunters in search of lupe (Pacific imperial pigeon Ducula pacifica) or manutagi (Crimson-crowned fruit dove Ptilinopus porphyraceus) may kill many-coloured fruit doves instead. In interviews conducted by American Samoa environmental officials, more than a quarter of hunters reported accidentally shooting a many-coloured fruit dove. In the 19th and early 20th centuries, large numbers of this bird were reported on Tutuila, American Samoa. In the 1970s, a population survey found there were around 80 individuals present. In the 1990s, there were 50 individuals on Tutuila reported.

Biologists with the American Samoa Department of Marine and Wildlife Resources and workers from Pacific Bird Conservation and the Toledo Zoo captured four many-coloured fruit dove to begin a captive breeding project at Association of Zoos and Aquariums facilities.
