= Massacre Bay (American Samoa) =

Bay in America Samoa

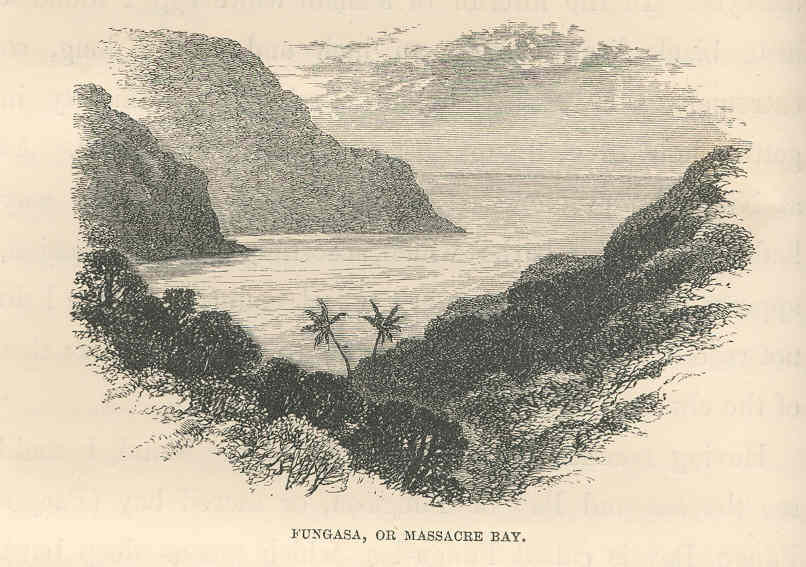
- 1873 illustration
- Interactive map of Massacre Bay
- Coordinates: 14.291619°S 170.761065°W

Massacre Bay, located on Tutuila Island in American Sāmoa, is home to the village of Aʻasu. As of 1999, only one family remains in the area now known as A’asutuai (Old Town Aʻasu), while the rest of the community has relocated to A’asufou (New A’asu). The bay holds historical significance, marked by an 1883 monument commemorating the Frenchmen who lost their lives there on December 11, 1787. Visitors can access Massacre Bay via a scenic hiking trail that descends from Aʻoloaufou.

== Etymology ==
On December 11, 1787, a deadly confrontation erupted between French explorers led by Lapérouse and over a thousand Samoan islanders on Tutuila Island, where Lapérouse’s men were attempting to obtain water. The clash resulted in the deaths of twelve French sailors—including Lapérouse’s second-in-command, Captain de Langle, scientist Robert de Lamanon, and approximately thirty Samoans. Following the attack, Lapérouse named the site "Massacre Island" and the nearby bay "Massacre Bay," a name that endures to this day.

== History ==
=== La Pérouse expedition ===
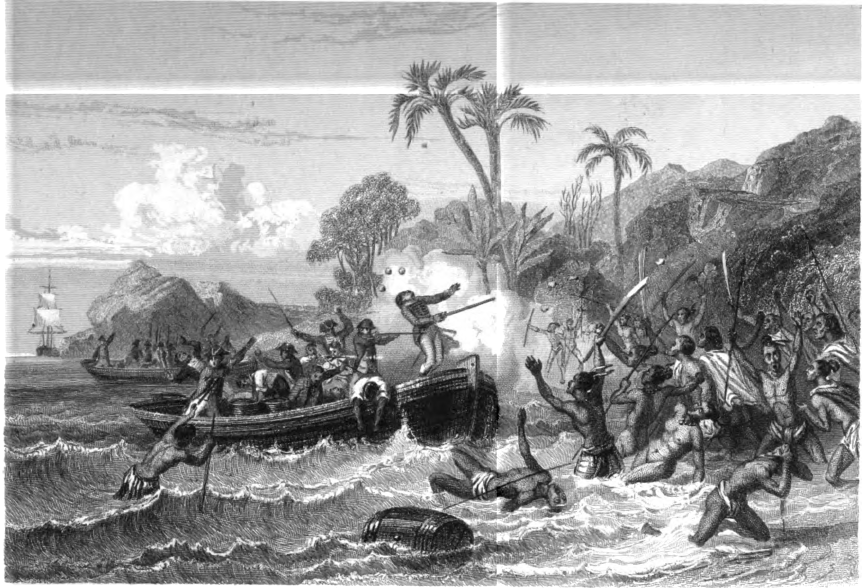
Death of Fleuriot de Langle in 1787.

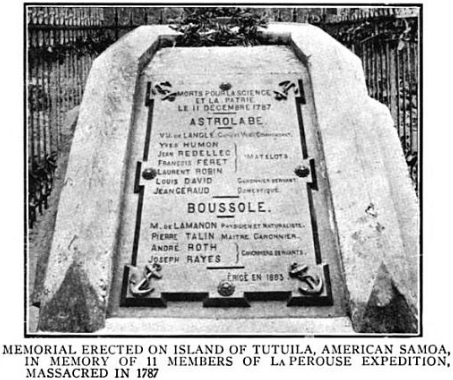
Laperouse expedition memorial, c. 1920.

French navigator Jean-François de Galaup, comte de Lapérouse, was tasked by King Louis XVI with exploring the region to establish French influence and economic interests. Sailing with two ships, Astrolabe and Boussole ("the Compass"), Lapérouse reached the Samoan archipelago, then known as the Navigator Islands, in December 1787. The Samoan islands had been sparsely visited by Europeans, with initial contact occurring in 1722. The French fleet’s arrival marked one of the first significant interactions between Europeans and Samoans. On December 10, 1787, two French parties arrived at Tutuila. One under Lapérouse landed at Fagasā, while the other, under Paul Antoine Fleuriot de Langle, landed at Aʻasu (A’asutuai) a few miles to the west. The expedition’s second-in-command, Paul Antoine Fleuriot de Langle, insisted on going ashore at Aʻasu to replenish fresh water supplies, despite La Pérouse’s objections about the islanders’ hostility. A heated debate ensued, with de Langle emphasizing the crew’s urgent need to combat scurvy with fresh water. Ultimately, La Pérouse reluctantly permitted the mission, albeit with strong reservations.

After several days of peaceful trade and interaction at Fagasā, tensions escalated when Commander De Langle led a landing party of 61 men to A‘asu to replenish water supplies. The visit, initially marked by friendly exchanges, became strained as over a thousand Samoans gathered near the French contingent. While the reasons remain unclear, hostility erupted when a hail of stones was launched at the French. De Langle and his men attempted to retreat to their boats but were overwhelmed by the sheer numbers of attackers. De Langle refrained from opening fire, fearing accusations of barbarity in Europe. However, the islanders launched a full-scale assault, fatally clubbing de Langle and also killing Robert de Lamanon while initiating a brutal skirmish. The French crew managed to kill thirty attackers but suffered heavy casualties. Those unable to escape to the smaller boats were slain. Survivors who swam to safety bore numerous wounds, mainly to the head. Survivors returned to the ships, deeply shaken and injured. The French retaliated with musket fire before retreating.

The massacre deeply shocked Lapérouse and his crew. In his journals, Lapérouse expressed his anguish and deliberated on the potential for retribution. However, the natural defenses of A‘asu, coupled with the French crew’s injuries, made a punitive expedition unfeasible. Opting against indiscriminate retaliation, Lapérouse departed for Botany Bay, Australia, to regroup. The French stayed at Botany Bay for six weeks, building two longboats to replace those lost in Massacre Bay. There was one more death, on February 17, the chaplain, Father Louis Receveur, died, likely of a wound he had received at Massacre Bay two months prior. Lapérouse and his fleet were lost at sea shortly after leaving Australia. News of the massacre reached Europe, where it was sensationalized and widely discussed.
