= Aʻasu, American Samoa =

Aʻasu
- Village
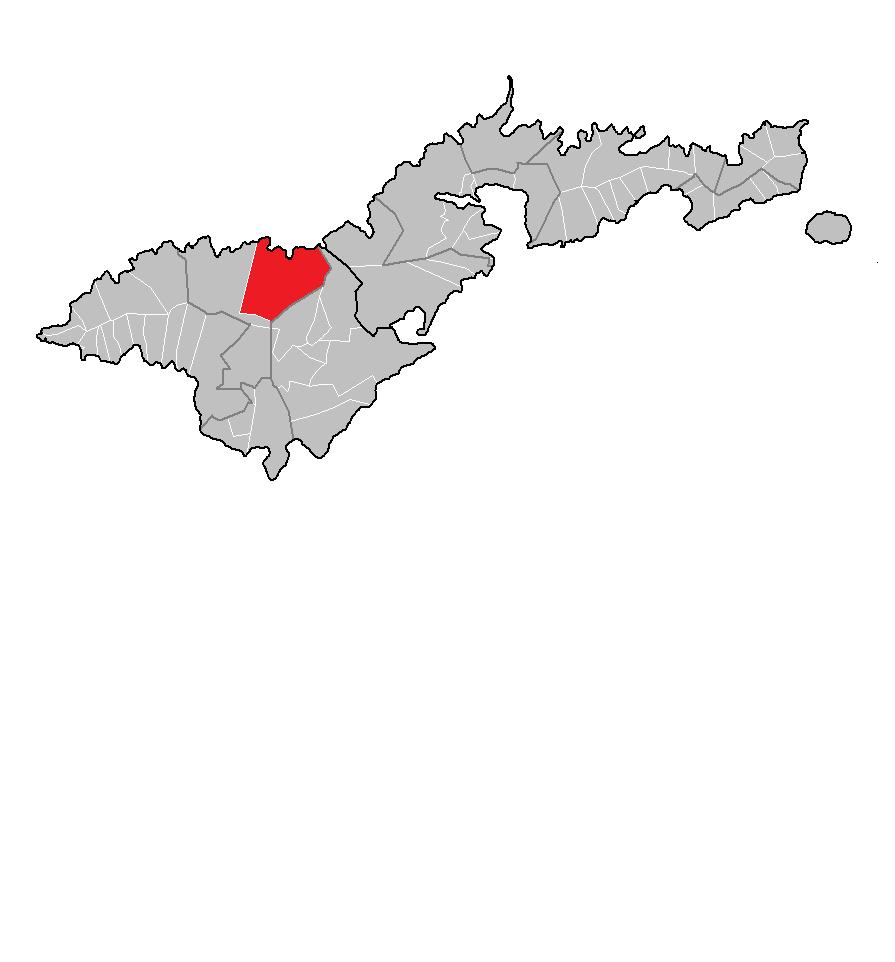

- Location within American Samoa
- Coordinates: 14°17′51″S 170°45′30″W
- Country: United States
- Territory: American Samoa
- County: Leasina

Area
  - Total: 2.7 sq mi (6.9 km^{2})
- Elevation: 43 ft (13 m)

Population (2020)
  - Total: 425
  - Density: 160/sq mi (62/km^{2})
- Demonym: Aʻasuan
- Time zone: UTC−11 (Samoa Time Zone)
- ZIP code: 96799
- Area code: +1 684

Aʻasu or Āsu is a village on the north coast of Tutuila Island, American Samoa. It is located to the west of Fagasa and northwest of Pago Pago. It is one of multiple villages involved in an archaeological survey of the island. Old Aʻasu lies on Massacre Bay and can be reached from a hiking trail in Aʻasufou (new Aʻasu).

Aʻasu has no road outlets, and can only be reached by hiking trails or by sea. It is a near-abandoned village which is home to just a few families. It is possible to camp in the village before returning to Aʻasufou. Aʻasu might be most famous for a battle which took place on December 11, 1787, where twelve Europeans and 39 Samoans were killed. A monument erected by the French can be found in Aasutuai (old Aʻasu).

In 1979, a road was constructed connecting the Tafuna Plain on the southern coast to the mountainous region above A‘asu. During the same year, a dirt road was extended down to A‘asu at Massacre Bay, but it was subsequently destroyed by a hurricane. Following the destruction, it was decided not to repair or pave the road. Instead, the residents of Aʻoloau and A‘asu collectively chose to relocate their towns to the mountainous area (Mount Olotele) along the newly constructed road. The original settlement of A‘asu now became known as A’asutuai (Old Town A‘asu), while the new village established in the mountains was named A’asufou (meaning “New A’asu). Over time, the latter came to be commonly referred to simply as A‘asu. Today, A‘asutuai is not permanently inhabited but is utilized as a seasonal fishing camp. Additionally, taro cultivation continues in the area, and it serves as a site for harvesting wild plants.

The village of Aʻasu along with Aʻoloau are jointly called ʻO Leasina.

Aʻasu was where the first European set foot on the Samoan Islands when the Perouse expedition arrived in 1787.

== Etymology ==
The name of the village, Aʻasu, is derived from the Samoan language and translates into English as “Smoke".

== History ==
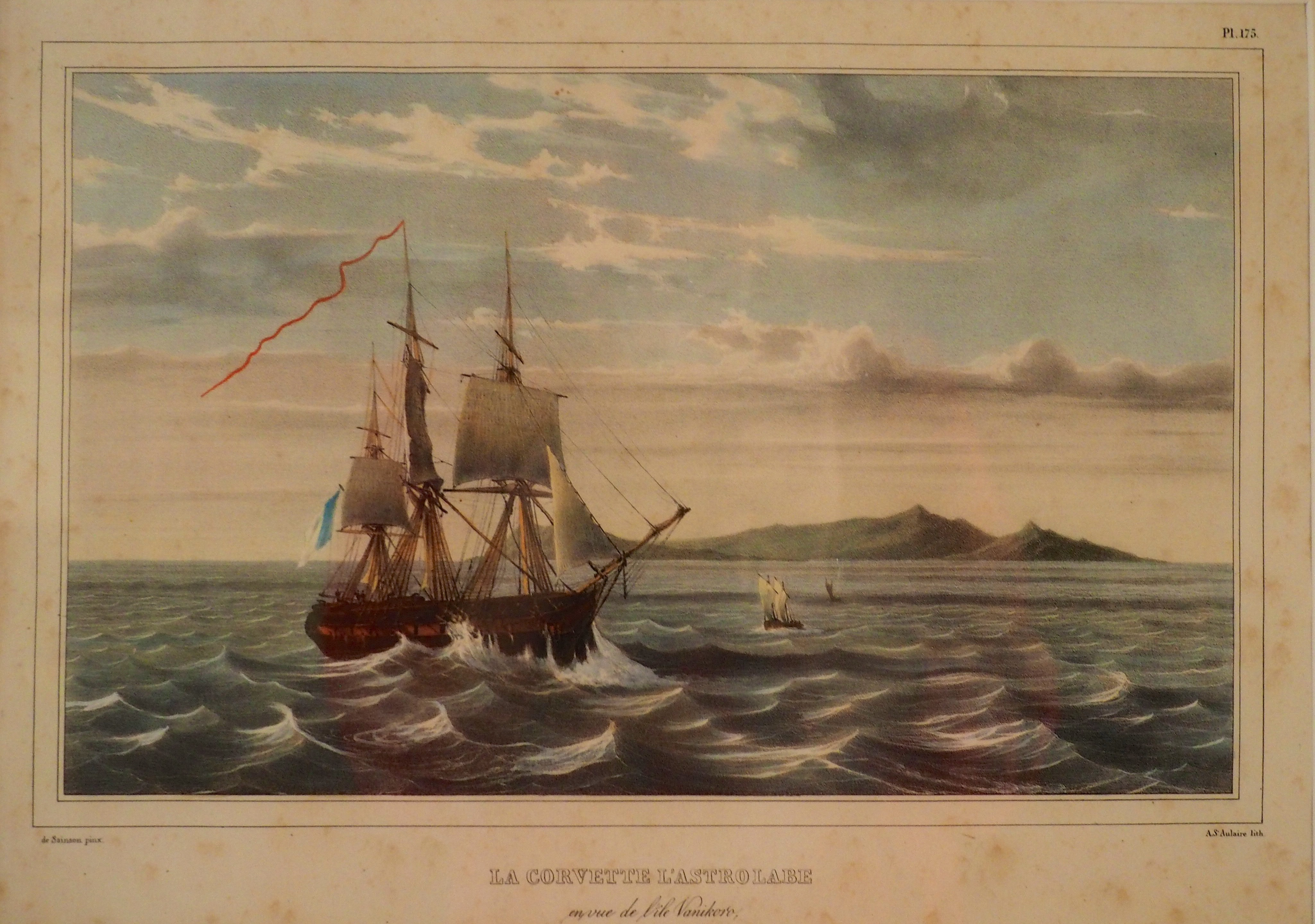
In 1787, Commander Fleuriot de Langle, leader of the French ship L’Astrolabe (depicted), was killed during an incident after anchoring at Aʻasu.

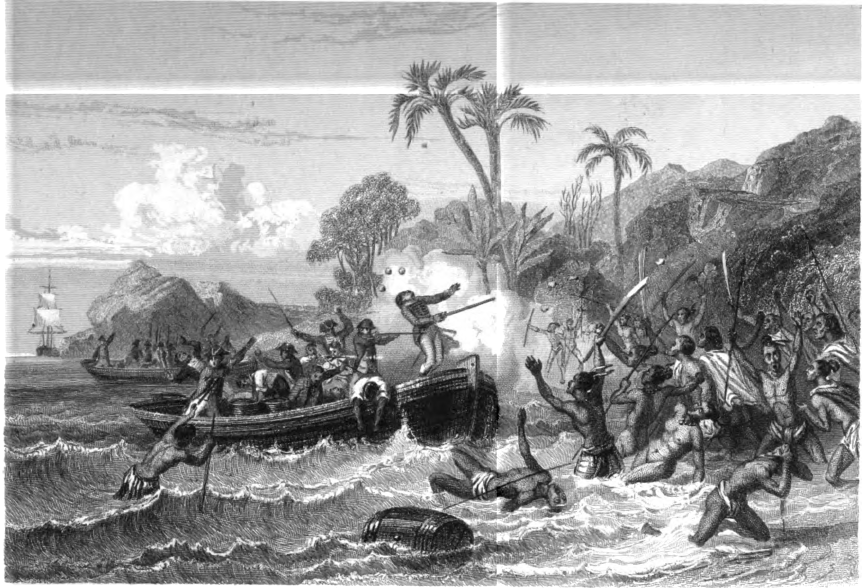
Death of Fleuriot de Langle in 1787.

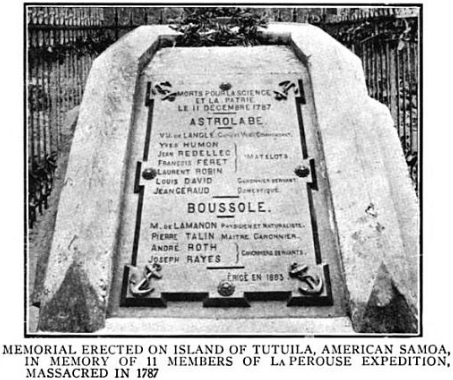
Lapérouse expedition memorial, c. 1920.

In 1787, two French ships reached Massacre Bay in Aʻasu, marking the first recorded instance of Europeans setting foot in the Samoan Islands. This event was part of the Lapérouse expedition which was tasked by King Louis XVI with exploring the region to establish French influence and economic interests. The expedition was led by Jean-François de Galaup, comte de Lapérouse, who commanded the vessel Boussole. Accompanying him was Commander Paul Antoine Fleuriot de Langle, who led the ship Astrolabe. An incident occurred, in which 12 members of Perouse's crew died at Massacre Bay. In response to this, a monument was erected by the French government in 1883 to commemorate the event; it is listed on the National Register of Historic Places.

On December 11, 1787, Paul Antoine Fleuriot de Langle along with sixty men in two cutters and two longboats entered the bay of Aasu. The tide was low and only the boats were able to make the passage to shore through the narrow channel. An increasing number of native Samoans arrived at the site, an estimated 1,500 Samoans were on or near the coast. For an unknown reason, a Samoan woman was hurt in her eye. De Langle got his men in the longboats, but the low tide slowed their retreat from Aasu. The Samoans began throwing rocks and De Langle was hit, fell from the vessel and died. Eleven more were killed before the French were able to swim the channel or wade over the reef to reach their cutters. Canoes approaching the cutters were kept at bay by repeated volleys of rifle fire. In total 12 French sailors were killed as well as another 20 wounded, Samoan casualties number around 39 killed or wounded. In addition to De Langle, Robert de Lamanon was killed, and Louis Receveur suffered severe injuries from which he later died.

Some have asserted that the violence was carried out by visiting warriors from Western Samoa, particularly from Aʻana, whose arrival coincided with Lapérouse's time at Aʻasu. For two days after the attack, Lapérouse patrolled the area outside Aʻasu Bay, either attempting to maneuver within firing range or contemplating a retaliatory strike. However, both options proved too dangerous. On December 12, five or six native boats approached carrying pigs and fruit for barter, but they did not come closer than 100 meters. As more boats arrived, Lapérouse repelled them with a gunshot, never intending to cause any harm. After the attack, Lapérouse designated Tutuila Island as "Massacre Island." The bay where the assault occurred continues to be known as Massacre Bay. There is an unverified account that a French youth survived in Aʻasu and subsequently settled on Tutuila.

In 1791, four years after the visit by Pérouse, English Captain Edward Edwards of HMS Pandora arrived at Tutuila while pursuing the mutineers of the Bounty. During their search, the sailors discovered a French military uniform that had belonged to one of Pérouse’s men, who had been killed at Aʻasu.

A monument was erected by the French government in 1883 and likely stands over the graves of killed Frenchmen. The monument consists of a rectangular concrete structure surrounded by a low concrete wall. Inside the concrete walls is a bronze plaque and cross. The cross is approximately eight feet high and the concrete structure about 7 feet (2.1 m)x15 feet (4.6 m). The monument is maintained by the village of Aʻasu. The massacre took place on the channel and beach right below the monument. The monument makes no mention of the 39 murdered Samoans, nor does it acknowledge the Chinese member of the expedition who also died.

=== Otto von Kotzebue ===
In 1824, the Russian explorer Otto von Kotzebue visited the village of Aʻasu, anticipating an encounter similar to that experienced by Lapérouse in 1787, when numerous canoes had approached. Contrary to his expectations, Kotzebue was initially met by only one canoe bearing three men. After signaling permission, one Samoan climbed aboard via a rope, observed the deck, and presented coconuts. In return, he received a piece of iron, which he pressed against his forehead in a gesture of appreciation. Subsequently, several more Samoans appeared, surrounding the ship in canoes. Although a number of Samoans attempted to board, the Russians permitted only a few to come aboard. According to Kotzebue’s account, the Samoans promptly attempted to seize various items, displaying their acquisitions to those who remained in the canoes below.

Among the visitors, one individual assumed a ceremonious demeanor, raising his gifts overhead and uttering phrases that provoked laughter among his compatriots. While Kotzebue initially believed this individual to be a chief, it is more likely he was enacting a form of "fale aitu", a traditional Samoan style of comedic performance. Tensions arose when the Samoans produced wooden clubs and demanded glass beads. Interpreting their actions and vocal tones as menacing, Kotzebue feared an imminent attack. Concluding that hostilities might ensue, he decided to depart, narrowly avoiding an order for his men to open fire.

== Demographics ==
Population growth
2020	425
2010	494
2000	364
1990	341
1980	214
1970	89
1960	114
1950	101
1940	88
1930	85

== Geography ==
Most of the village and all of its inhabitants reside in Leasina County in the Western District, however, a small portion of the village (0.04-square-mile (0.10 km^{2})) is located in Ituau County in the Eastern District.

The village is divided in half by the Aasu Stream which flows down from the high ground behind and cuts a channel through the off-lying reef. It is located in a "cul-de-sac" between mountain spurs.

In 1985, Massacre Bay was designated the first marine sanctuary in the United States. It is also the smallest marine sanctuary in the country, at a 0.25-square-mile (0.65 km^{2}). Massacre Bay lies just eastward of Aloau Bay and is a small bay surrounded by tall mountains.

Fagafue Bay, which is roughly half a mile to the east of Siliaga Point, is a small inlet backed by a mountainous bay. The name of this bay, Fagafue, is derived from the Samoan language and translates into English as "Bay of Convolvulus".

== See also ==
- National Register of Historic Places listings in American Samoa
