= Jean-André Mongez =

French geologist (1750–1788)

Jean-André Mongez (21 November 1750 – May 1788) was a French priest and mineralogist. He is presumed to have died at Vanikoro, on the La Pérouse expedition.

== Life ==
Mongez was born in Lyon. He joined the canons regulars of Sainte-Geneviève Abbey in Paris and devoted himself to scientific studies, giving his findings to several scholarly societies.

As editor of the Journal de Physique, he belonged to the Société d’histoire naturelle at the académies de Rouen, Dijon and Lyon. Many had called for him to enter the Académie des sciences when he left in 1785 as doctor and almoner to the Pérouse expedition. He had been presented for this role by his abbot at Sainte-Geneviève Abbey, Pingré, and his talents also extended to ornithology, entomology, water chemistry, and mineral salts. He received patents from the Jardin royal des plantes to collect for it before setting out.

In the course of the journey, at Ténérife, all the ship's scholars climbed the mountain, with La Martinière collecting plants and Monneron making an attempt to level out the peak (which failed since the muletiers refused to go right to the top). Father Louis Receveur and his colleagues Lamanon and Mongez experimented on air, magnetics and electricity at the peak. At Macao Lamanon, La Martinière, Mongez and Receveur addressed a collective letter to Lapérouse complaining that he did not listen to them sufficiently.

== Publications ==
- Description, usages et avantages de la machine pour la fracture des jambes d'Albert Pieropan, 1782, in-8°;
- Manuel du minéralogiste, etc., traduit de Bergmann et augmenté de Notes.

== See also ==
- European and American voyages of scientific exploration

== Sources ==
- site geneanet samlap
- Louis Gabriel Michaud. "Jean-André Mongez". Biographie universelle ancienne et moderne : histoire par ordre alphabétique de la vie publique et privée de tous les hommes avec la collaboration de plus de 300 savants et littérateurs français ou étrangers (in French) (2 ed.).
