= HCS Research (1823) =

History

British India
- Name: Research
- Builder: J. Scott & Co., Fort Gloster, Calcutta
- Launched: 1823
- Fate: Wrecked in 1835

General characteristics
- Tons burthen: 250, or 253 (bm)
- Propulsion: Sail
- Armament: 10 guns (1824-26)
- Notes: Teak-built

HCS Research was a ship that the British East India Company (EIC) had built for it in 1823 at Fort Gloster (Calcutta) to serve as a survey ship. She is most famous for her 1827 voyage under the command of Captain Peter Dillon that discovered the fate of Count Lapérouse's expedition and its ships Boussole and Astrolabe.

During the period 1824-26, the Burmese War diverted Research from her surveying duties. She received ten guns and Captain John Crawford, together with Messrs. C. B. Richardson and C.Montriou, of the Marine, as his officers, participated in the military operations. Mr. Rogers, the second officer, was killed in action at Avas.

The EIC sold Research at some point.

Research appeared in the Supplemental pages of the Register of Shipping in 1833. It reported her master as Ogilvie, her owner as Bruce and Co., and her trade as London to Calcutta. She was lost at Nursapore in 1835.
