= French ship Lapérouse =

Two ships of the French Navy have borne the name Lapérouse in honour of Jean-François de Galaup, comte de Lapérouse

- French cruiser Lapérouse, an unarmoured barbette cruiser, lead ship of her class
- French ship Lapérouse (A791), a hydrographic survey ship, lead ship of her class
