= French frigate Astrée (1780) =

Former French ship

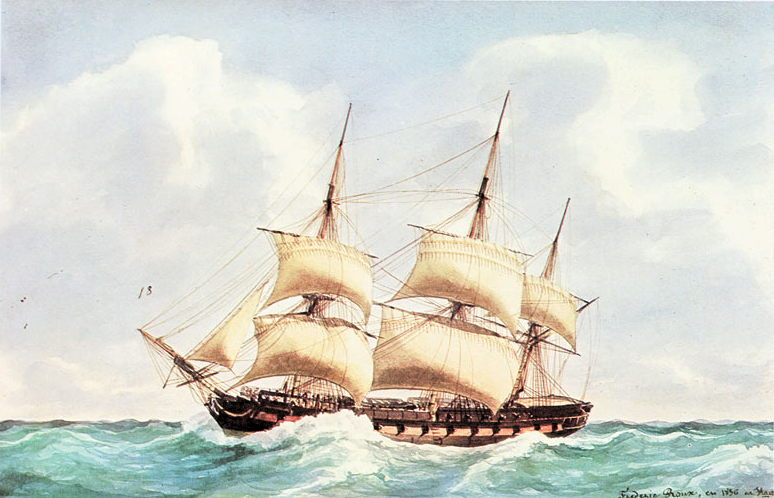
- Watercolour portrait of Astrée, by François Roux, commissioned by Willaumez

History

France
- Name: Astrée
- Ordered: 4 December 1778
- Builder: Brest (originally intended to be built at Saint-Malo)
- Laid down: August 1779
- Launched: 16 May 1780
- In service: July 1780
- Out of service: 29 January 1796
- Fate: Wrecked 1796

General characteristics
- Class & type: Nymphe-class frigate
- Displacement: 1100 tonneaux
- Tons burthen: 600 port tonneaux
- Length: 46.9 m (153 ft 10 in)
- Beam: 11.9 m (39 ft 1 in)
- Height: 5.8 m (19 ft 0 in)
- Sail plan: Full-rigged ship
- Armament: Gun deck: 26 × 12-pounder long guns; Castles: 6 × 6-pounder long guns

Astrée was a 32-gun Nymphe-class frigate of the French Navy. She served in the War of American Independence under Captain Lapérouse, notably taking part in the action of 21 July 1781 and the Hudson Bay expedition. During the French Revolutionary Wars, she took part in the Atlantic campaign of May 1794. Astrée was wrecked in 1796

== Career ==
From June 1781, Astrée took part in the War of American Independence under Captain Lapérouse. She was the flagship of a two-frigate division, also comprising Hermione, under Lieutenant Latouche Tréville. They engaged in commerce raiding off Boston. On 17 Hermione and Astrée captured the 12-gun merchantman Friendship; the next day, the 8-gun merchantman Phoenix; and on 19, the merchantman Lockard Ross. On 21 July 1781, Hermione and Astrée encountered a British convoy and engaged, leading to the Naval battle of Louisbourg where they captured the 14-gun corvette Jack.

In August 1782, she took part in the Hudson Bay expedition, along with Engageante and the 74-gun Sceptre, under Fleuriot de Langle.

Astrée was put in reserve in Brest in March 1791. In June 1792, under Captain de Cambis, she escorted a convoy to Saint Domingue. She took part in the Atlantic campaign of May 1794 and was part of the squadron under Van Stabel.

== Fate ==
Astrée was wrecked off Santo Amaro, Azores on 29 January 1796 with the loss of 138 lives.
