= French ship Lapérouse (A791) =

French Navy hydrography survey vessel

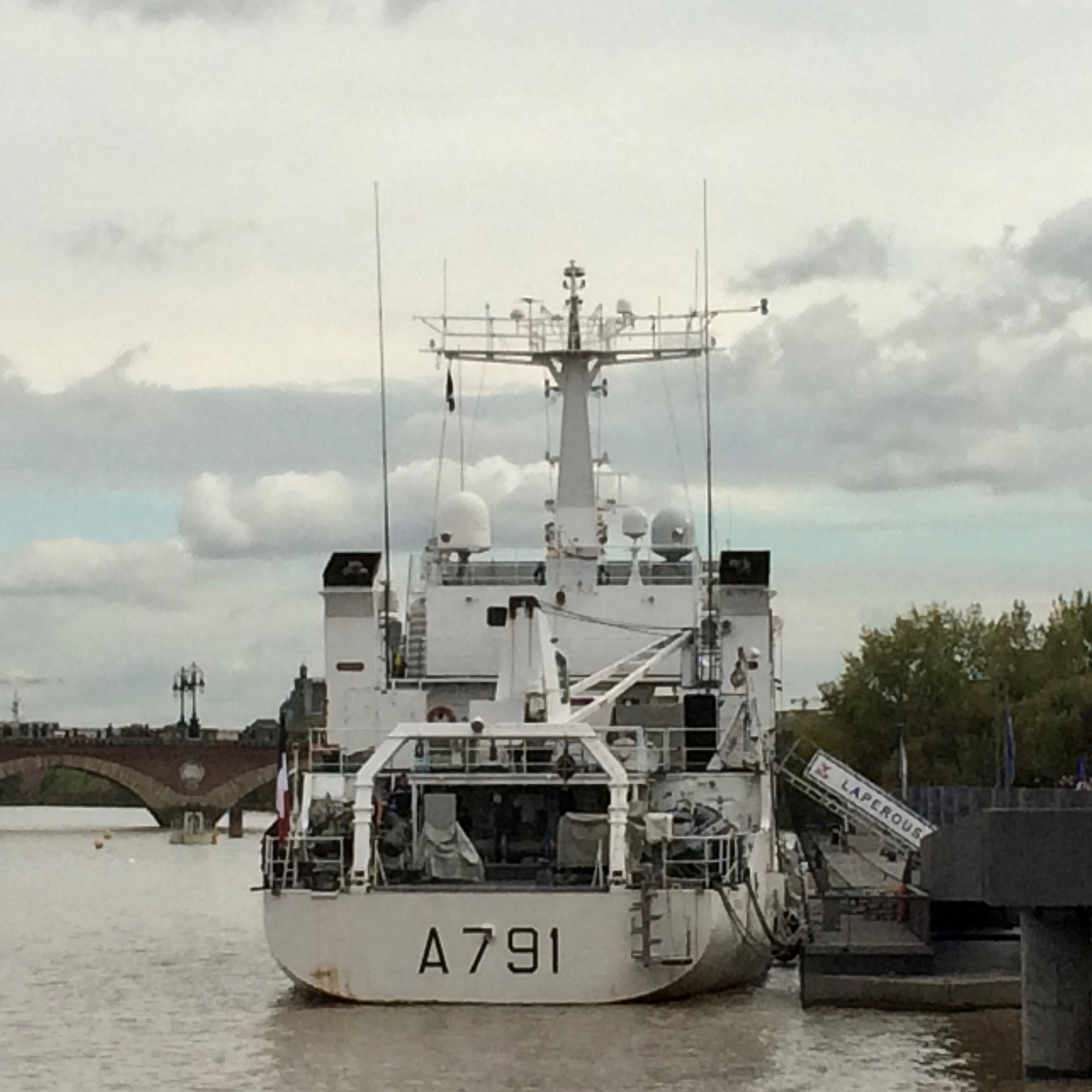
- Lapérouse (A791) docked at the quay of Bordeaux in 2017

Class overview
- Name: Lapérouse
- Builders: DCAN Lorient
- Operators: French Navy

General characteristics
- Class & type: Lapérouse
- Type: Survey vessel
- Displacement: 850 t
- Length: 59 m
- Beam: 10.9 m
- Draft: 3.63 m
- Installed power: 2500 hp (1840 kW); electric plant 620 kW
- Propulsion: 2 diesel motors (SACM Wärtsilä UD30 RVR V12 M6), 2 controllable pitch propellers, 1 bow thruster
- Range: 6,000 nautical miles at 12 knots
- Complement: 4 officers, 18 petty officers, 15 crew members, 11 hydrographers
- Sensors & processing systems: Navigational radar DECCA 1226
- Armament: 2 AANF1 7.5 mm machine guns and 2 Browning M2 12.7 mm machine guns
- Notes: electric plant 620 kW

Lapérouse (A 791) is a hydrography survey vessel of the Lapérouse class of the French Navy (designed Bâtiment hydrographique de deuxième classe (BH)). The ship is deployed on the French coast, or in foreign waters for international cooperation. She is fitted with electric propulsion and a hydrographic winch that allows it to perform oceanographic work.

== History ==
Laid down on 11 June 1985 and launched on 15 November 1986, the hydrographic vessel Lapérouse entered into service on 20 April 1988. She was the first vessel of her class, and is currently serving with the Naval Hydrographic and Oceanographic Service of the French Navy (Service Hydrographique et Océanographique de la Marine-SHOM)). The ship was laid down on 11 June 1985 by DCN Lorient, launched on 15 November 1985, and commissioned by the French Navy as Lapérouse A791 on 20 April 1988.

Lapérouse has her home port at Brest. She performs hydrographic work for the Naval Hydrographic and Oceanographic Service (SHOM), although since 2 June 2000 she has been hierarchically attached to the Naval Action Force (FAN).

Her main mission is scientific, but being a naval ship, she is also capable of handling piracy, terrorism, evacuating French citizens is case of natural or political crisis, or rescuing seamen in distress. Furthermore, she occasionally serves as a coast guard.

The patron city of Lapérouse has been Albi (Tarn) since 7 October 1988.

== Characteristics ==
- Displacement : 850 t.
- Dimensions (meters) : 59 × 10,9 × 3.63.
- Range : 6,000 nautical miles at 12 knots.
- Propulsion : 2 SACM Wärtsilä UD30 RVR V12 M6 diesel motors, 2 controllable pitch propeller, 1 bow thruster.
- Power : 2500 hp (1840 kW).
- Radar : Navigational radar DECCA 1226.
- Electric plant : 620 kW.
- Complement : 4 officers, 18 petty officers, 15 crew members, 11 hydrographers.
- Armament: Two AANF1 7.5 mm machine guns and two Browning M2 12.7 mm machine guns

The hull and the superstructures are painted white, as is the case for all scientific ships of the French Navy.
