= Louis Receveur =

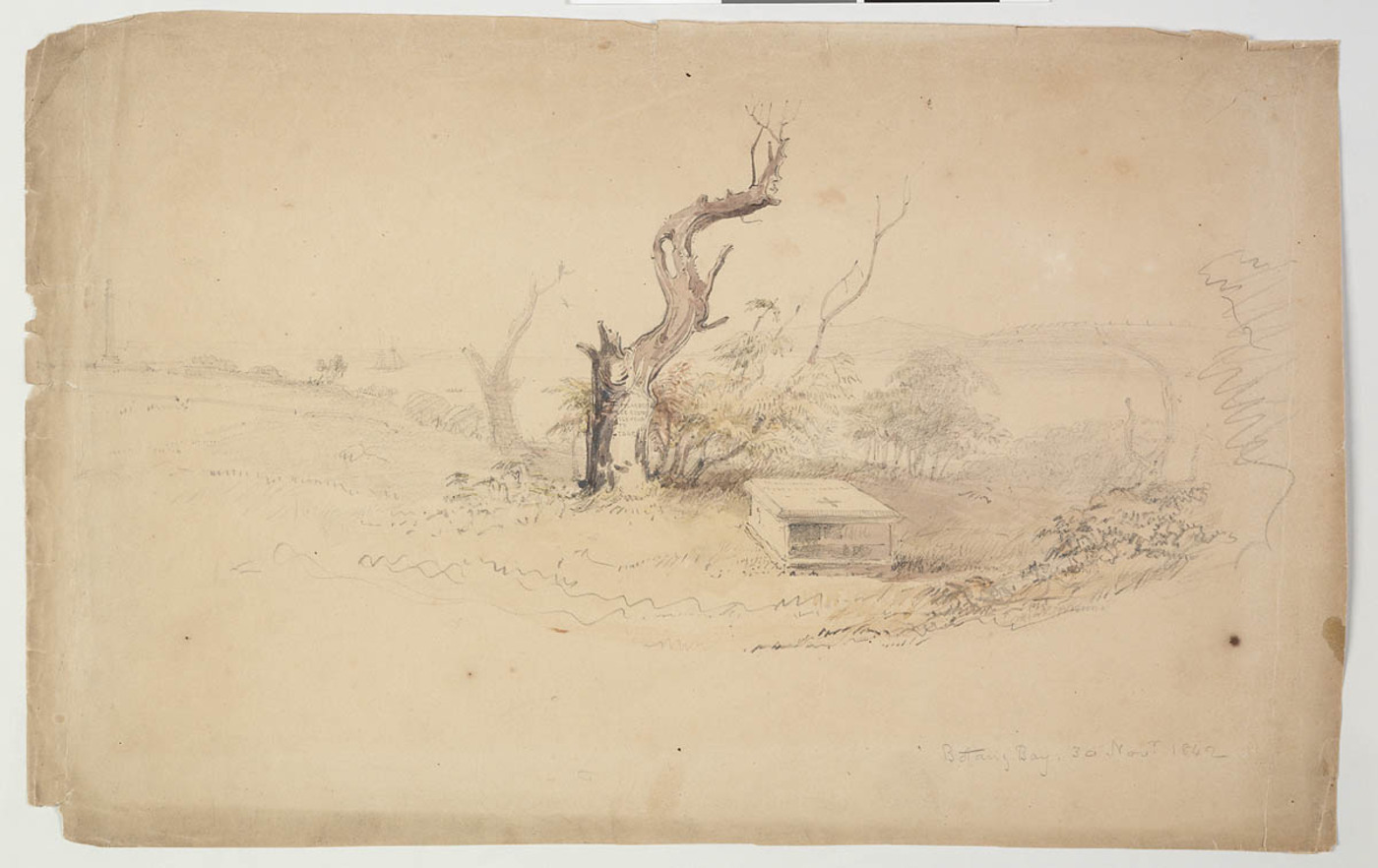
- 1842 sketch of the Bougainville grave and tree
- Born: 1757 April 25; Noël-Cerneux
- Died: 17 February 1788 (aged 37–38)
- Burial place: La Perouse, New South Wales; 33°59′17″S 151°13′56″E

Claude-Francois Joseph Louis Receveur O.F.M. Conv., (25 April 1757 – 17 February 1788) was a French friar priest, naturalist and astronomer who sailed with Jean-François de Galaup, comte de La Pérouse.

Receveur was also considered a skilled botanist, geologist, chemist, meteorologist, and philologist and has been described as being as close as one could get to being an ecologist in the 18th century.

== Ministry and Expedition ==
Since the Conventual Franciscans encourages its members to pursue service to society, 'Père Laurent Receveur', embraced scientific studies and also undertook a number of missions for the French navy between 1776 and 1780. Then in 1785, when La Perouse was appointed by Louis XVI and his minister of marine, the Marquis de Castries, to lead an expedition around the world. Receveur was one of two priests on the expedition and was stationed aboard the ship L'Astrolabe; the other was Jean-André Mongez.

At some stage during December 1787 or January 1788, the La Perouse expedition arrived at Tutuila in the Samoan Islands. Those who made land-fall came into conflict with the local indigenous people at Aʻasu. Receveur was gravely injured, receiving what was described as a “violent contusion of the eye”.

== Arrival in Australia ==
The expedition continued to Australia where it arrived at Botany Bay six days after the First Fleet. La Perouse erected a camp on shore and established relations with the British, who sailed around from Sydney Cove to visit his camp. However, Receveur never recovered from his injuries and died on 17 February 1788. He was buried at the camp.

Receveur was the first Catholic priest and the second non-indigenous person to be buried in Australia. His obsequies are considered to have constituted the first Catholic religious ceremony held in Australia.

== Modern recognition ==
Local churches of La Perouse in Sydney hold a special memorial mass in February each year to recognise the historical religious significance of Receveur's arrival, death and burial.

Abbe Receveur Place in Little Bay, New South Wales was named in his honour.

== See also ==
- List of Roman Catholic scientist-clerics
