= Paul Antoine Fleuriot de Langle =

French vicomte, académicien de marine, naval commander and explorer

Paul Antoine Fleuriot Vicomte de Langle
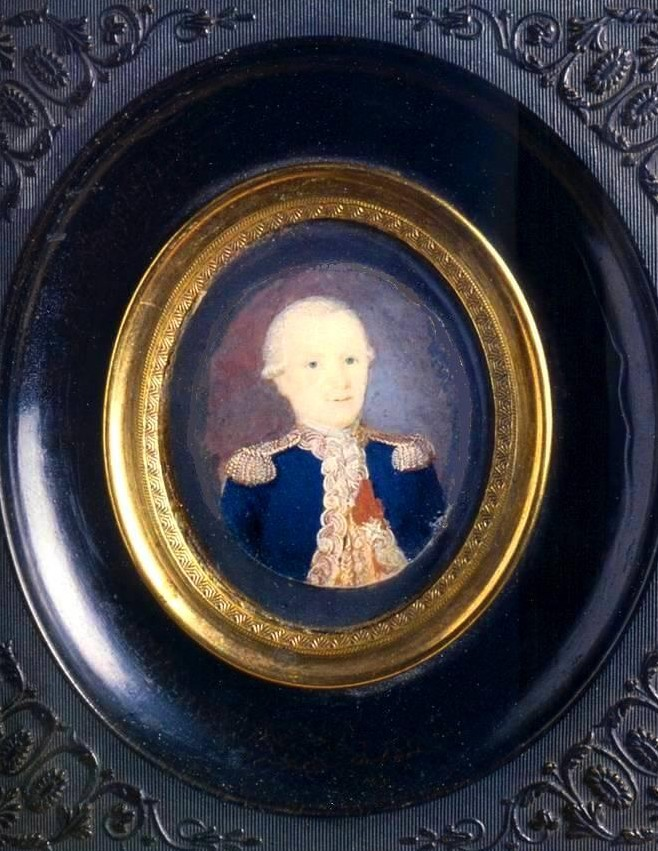
- Miniature portrait of Fleuriot de Langle
- Born: 1 August 1744; Kerlouët Castle, France
- Died: 11 December 1787 (aged 43); Aʻasu, Tutuila
- Burial place: Choir of Saint-Louis Church, Brest
- Military career
- Allegiance: Kingdom of France
- Branch: French Royal Navy
- Service years: 1758 – 1787
- Rank: Rear-Admiral
- Nickname: Fleuriot de Langle
- Commands: Experiment; Astrée; Astrolabe
- Conflicts: Hudson Bay expedition
- Awards: Knight of the Order of Saint Louis; Society of the Cincinnati

Paul Antoine Fleuriot de Langle (1 August 1744, château de Kerlouët at Quemper-Guézennec, Côtes-d'Armor – 11 December 1787, Maouna, Samoa) was a French vicomte, académicien de marine, naval commander and explorer. He was second in command of the La Pérouse expedition, which departed France on 1 August 1785 and was eventually lost in the Pacific. Fleuriot de Langle died in an encounter with natives in what is now American Samoa before the expedition was lost; his remains were returned to France, and were buried in the choir of the church of Saint-Louis at Brest.

== Biography ==
In 1771, aged only 27, Fleuriot de Langle was admitted as a member of the Académie de Marine. He was promoted to Lieutenant in 1778.

Fleuriot de Langle took part in the American Revolutionary War. In April 1781, Fleuriot de Langle was given command of the 32-gun frigate Résolue. From March 1782, he commanded the 50-gun Experiment, and then commanded the frigate Astrée in the Hudson Bay expedition under La Pérouse's orders.

For Fleuriot de Langle's expertise, knowledge of math and astronomy, and force of character, La Pérouse chose him as his deputy for his next expedition, commanding the 114-man frigate Astrolabe (accompanied by the Boussole) on a voyage of exploration into the Pacific Ocean.

On the return voyage in 1787, fearing scurvy among his crew, Langle and La Pérouse landed on the Samoan island of Maouna to look for drinking water and fresh food, which they were running out of (Langle and La Pérouse both recognised the importance of fresh food in fighting scurvy, and – unlike La Pérouse – was persuaded by the observations of Captain Cook that fresh water was also valuable in this regard). With their boats laden with water barrels, they waited for a tide high enough to rejoin their ship, but, according to the survivors' accounts, they were in the meantime faced with ravishing young women, their hair decorated with hibiscus, advancing across the beach towards them and offering them sex. After many weeks at sea, these advances were evidently not unanimously rebuffed and extreme confusion and disorder followed.

To convince the indigenous chiefs to re-establish order, and to divert the ladies' attention, Fleuriot de Langle offered the women several trivial objects, and they retired in good order. The exchange of gifts and the inevitable comparisons that followed created jealousies and only boosted the tensions. Soon 7 to 8 thousand hostile natives encircled the boats and the casks and prevented the French from re-embarking, but Langle refused to fire on them since the French king's orders had been to keep the mission peaceful. Hit on the head by a stone, he fell into the water, dead, and his sailors opened fire. In the ensuing massacre, 12 sailors were killed and 20 wounded and finished off with club blows.

== Legacy ==
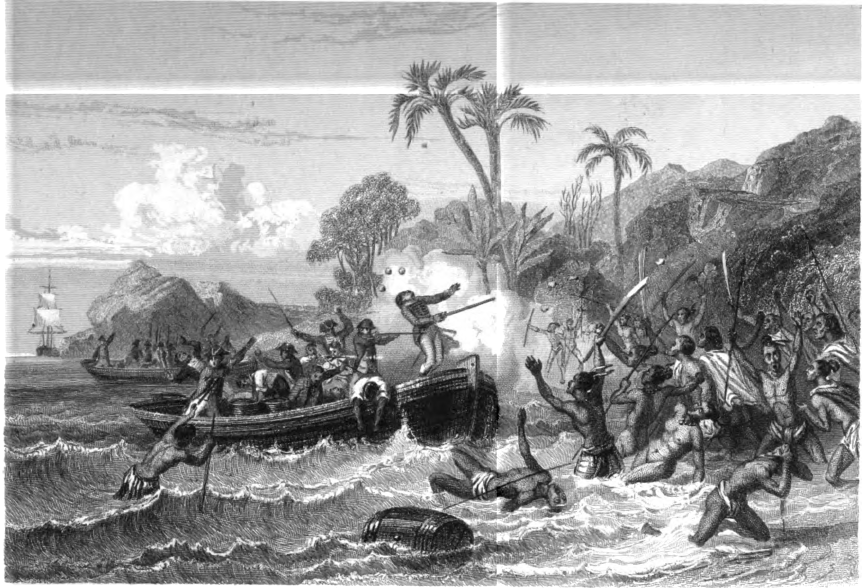
Death of Langle, as depicted in 1846

Fleuriot de Langle was posthumously promoted to Chef de Division on 24 April 1788. La Pérouse said of Langle that "He died for his humanity" and "I have lost by the most horrific of treasons my best friend, my friend for thirty years. A man full of spirit, judgement, knowledge, and certainly one of the best officers in all the fleets of Europe". His remains were buried in the choir of the church of Saint-Louis at Brest.

Paul-Antoine Fleuriot de Langle is featured on a Monument to the Dead on the site on the island of Tutuila in American Samoa, inscribed "Inauguré en 1883 pour honorer la mémoire de onze membres de l'expédition Lapérouse massacrés en ce lieu." (inaugurated in 1883 to honour the memory of de Langle and the 11 other members of the Lapérouse expedition massacred on this site).

In 1999, an archaeological expedition to Vanikoro dived on the wrecks of Boussole and Astrolabe, and found a silver fork with the coat of arms of Fleuriot de Langle.
