= Jean-François de Galaup, comte de Lapérouse =

French Navy officer and explorer (1741–1788)

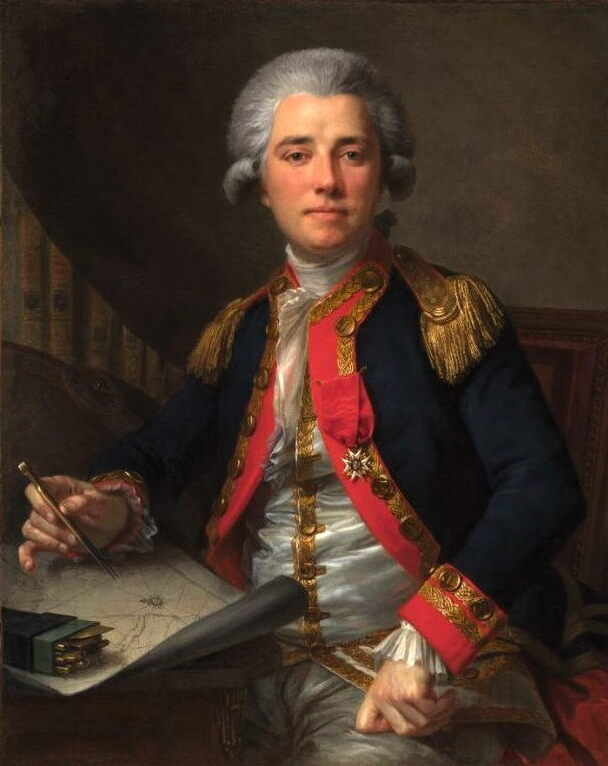
- Portrait by Geneviève Brossard de Beaulieu, 1778
- Born: 23 August 1741; Albi, France
- Died: c. 1788 (aged 46–47); Off Vanikoro, Pacific Ocean (presumed)
- Military career
- Allegiance: France
- Branch: French Navy
- Service years: 1756–1788
- Rank: Chef d'escadre
- Commands: Amazone; Astrée; Boussole
- Conflicts: Seven Years' War; Louisbourg Expedition; Battle of Quiberon Bay; Battle of Signal Hill; American Revolutionary War; Action of 21 July 1781; Battle of Saint Kitts; Battle of the Saintes; Hudson Bay expedition
- Awards: Chevalier de Saint-Louis

Chef d'escadre Jean François de Galaup, comte de Lapérouse (French: [lapeʁuz]; 23 August 1741 – c. 1788) was a French Navy officer and explorer. Having enlisted in the Navy at the age of 15, he had a successful career and in 1785 was appointed to lead a scientific expedition around the world. His ships stopped in Chile, Hawaii, Alaska, California, Macau, the Philippines, Korea, Russia, Japan, Samoa, Tonga, and Australia before wrecking on the reefs of Vanikoro in the Solomon Islands.

== Early career ==
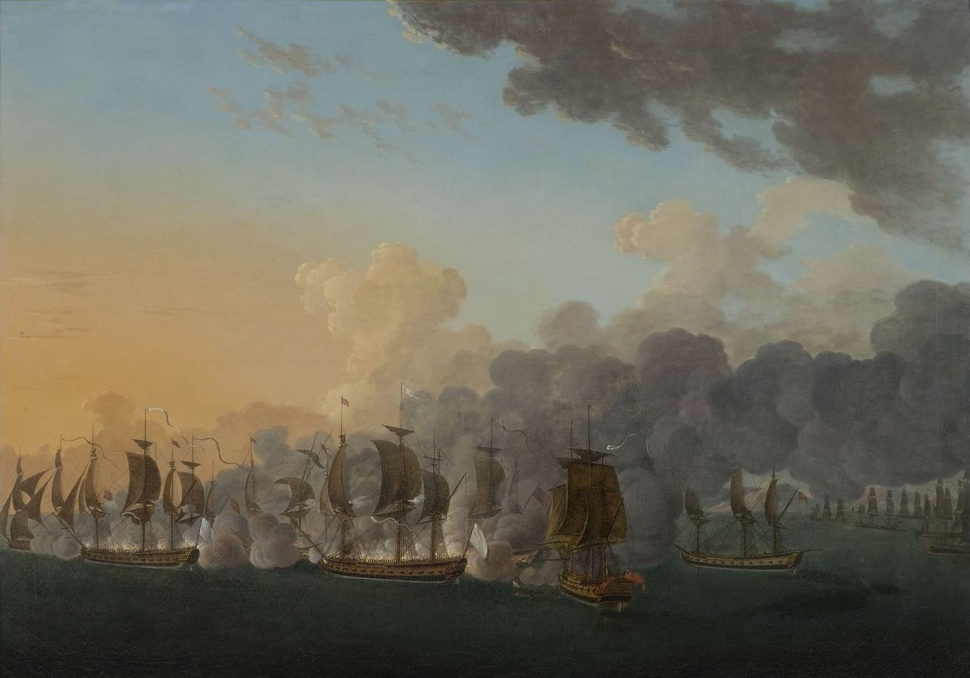
Lapérouse commanded the frigate Astrée in the action of 21 July 1781.

Jean-François de Galaup was born on 23 August 1741 near Albi, France. His family had been ennobled in 1558.

Lapérouse studied in a Jesuit college and joined the French Royal Navy as a Garde-Marine in Brest on 19 November 1756. In 1757 he was appointed to the French ship Célèbre and participated in a supply expedition to the fort of Louisbourg in New France. Lapérouse also took part in a second supply expedition in 1758 to Louisbourg, but as it was in the early years of the Seven Years' War the fort was under siege and the expedition was forced to make a circuitous route around Newfoundland to avoid British patrols.

In 1759 Lapérouse was wounded in the Battle of Quiberon Bay, where he was serving aboard Formidable. He was captured by the British and briefly imprisoned before being paroled back to France; he was formally exchanged in December 1760. He participated in a 1762 attempt by the French to gain control of Newfoundland, escaping with the fleet when the British arrived in force to drive them out.

At the outbreak of the Anglo-French War in 1778, Lapérouse was given command of the 32-gun frigate Amazone. On 7 October 1779, he captured the 20-gun HMS Ariel. Lapérouse was promoted to captain on 4 April 1780, and was part of the Expédition Particulière under Admiral Ternay, departing Brest on 2 May 1780. From October to November 1780, Amazone sailed from Rhode Island to Lorient, and from there to the Caribbean Sea.

Lapérouse then transferred to Astrée. In mid 1781, he was offered command of the 50-gun Sagittaire, but as his crew was sick with scurvy, he requested permission to keep command of Astrée, and was appointed to lead a frigate division, along with Hermione, under Latouche-Tréville.

Lapérouse escorted a convoy to the West Indies in December 1781, participated in the attack on St. Kitts in February 1782 and then fought in the defeat at the Battle of the Saintes against the squadron of Admiral Rodney. In August 1782, he captured two British trading posts (the Prince of Wales Fort and York Fort) on the coast of Hudson Bay, but allowed his prisoners, including Governor Samuel Hearne of Prince of Wales Fort, to sail off to England in exchange for a promise to release French prisoners of war held in Britain. The next year, his family finally consented to his marriage to Louise-Eléonore Broudou, a young creole of modest origins whom he had met on Île de France eight years earlier.

== Scientific expedition around the world ==
=== Objectives ===
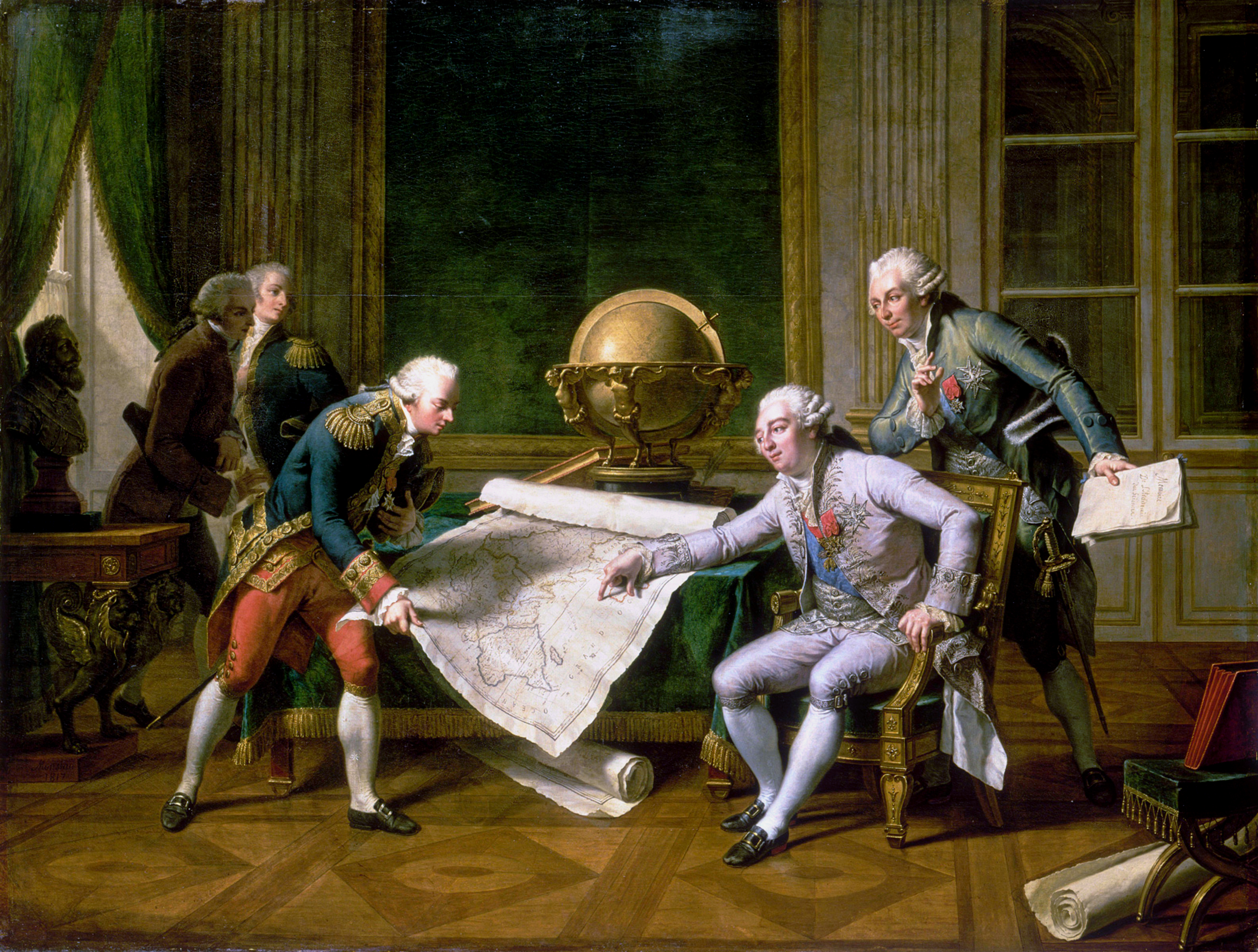
Louis XVI, seated at right, giving Lapérouse his instructions on 29 June 1785. Louis XVI Giving His Instructions to La Pérouse by Nicolas-André Monsiau (1817). (Château de Versailles)

Lapérouse was appointed in 1785 by Louis XVI and by the Secretary of State of the Navy, the Marquis de Castries, to lead an expedition around the world. Many countries were initiating voyages of scientific explorations at that time.

The expedition's aims were to complete the Pacific discoveries of James Cook (whom Lapérouse greatly admired), and like Cook with botanist Joseph Banks, his over aim was to enrich French science and scientific collections. However, the French government's main aim was to correct and complete Cook's maps of the area, establish trade contacts, open new maritime routes, and discover whether or not the British intention to establish a colony at Botany Bay was a genuine form of settlement, or intended to create a British Admiralty Pacific Fleet and in so doing, squeeze the French and Spanish out of extensive areas of the Pacific not yet explored.

=== Background and planning ===
The scientific aspects of these voyages were often added to camouflage the political and commercial motivations, especially following the French defeat by the British following the Seven Years' War and France's loss of influence in the American Revolutionary states and Canada. Initially, Louis Antoine de Bougainville had been sent out by the French in 1764 to colonise the Falkland Islands and in 1766 to explore the Pacific seeking commercial and colonial potential.

Louis XVI and his court had been stimulated by a proposal from the Dutch-born merchant adventurer William Bolts, who had earlier tried unsuccessfully to interest Louis's brother-in-law, the Holy Roman Emperor Joseph II (brother of Queen Marie Antoinette), in a similar voyage. The French court adopted the concept (though not its author, Bolts), leading to the dispatch of the Lapérouse expedition. Charles Pierre Claret de Fleurieu, Director of Ports and Arsenals, stated in the draft memorandum on the expedition that he submitted to the Louis XVI: "the utility which may result from a voyage of discovery ... has made me receptive to the views put to me by Mr. Bolts relative to this enterprise". But Fleurieu explained to the King: "I am not proposing at all, however, the plan for this voyage as it was conceived by Mr. Bolts".

=== Preparation and organization ===
==== Ships and scope of the expedition ====
His ships were L'Astrolabe (under Fleuriot de Langle) and La Boussole, both 500 tons. They were storeships reclassified as frigates for the occasion. Their overt objectives were geographic, scientific, ethnological, economic (looking for opportunities for whaling or fur trading), and political (the eventual establishment of French bases or colonial cooperation with their Spanish allies in the Philippines). They were to explore both the north and south Pacific, including the coasts of the Far East and of Australia, and send back reports through existing European outposts in the Pacific.

==== Crew ====
Lapérouse was well liked by his men. Among his crew there were ten scientists: Joseph Lepaute Dagelet (1751–1788), an astronomer and mathematician; Robert de Lamanon, a geologist; La Martinière, a botanist; a physicist; three naturalists; and three illustrators, Gaspard Duché de Vancy and an uncle and nephew named Prévost. Another of the scientists was Jean-André Mongez. Even both chaplains were scientifically schooled.

One of the young men who applied for the voyage was a 16-year-old Corsican named Napoléon Bonaparte. Bonaparte, a second lieutenant from Paris' military academy at the time, made the preliminary list but he was ultimately not chosen for the voyage list and remained behind in France. At the time, Bonaparte was interested in serving in the navy rather than army because of his proficiency in mathematics and artillery, both valued skills on warships.

Copying the work methods of Cook's scientists, the scientists on this voyage would base their calculations of longitude on precision chronometers and the distance between the Moon and the Sun followed by theodolite triangulations or bearings taken from the ship, the same as those taken by Cook to produce his maps of the Pacific islands. As regards geography, Lapérouse decisively showed the rigour and safety of the methods proven by Cook. From his voyage, the resolution of the problem of longitude was evident and mapping attained a scientific precision. Impeded (as Cook had been) by the continual mists enveloping the northwestern coast of America, he did not succeed any better in producing complete maps, though he managed to fill in some of the gaps.

=== British rivalry and Botany Bay ===
This was a period of extensive espionage conducted between Britain and France, seeking maritime commercial and naval dominance. A French spy in London discovered that a First Fleet of 11 ships including convict transporters and store ships was being sent out to Botany Bay. There is no suggestion in Arthur Phillip's nor James Cook's nor Banks' journals and actions that Port Jackson was or could be the preferred site for the new colony. Phillip was dissatisfied with the poor water supply at Botany Bay. Aware of Cook's reports of potential harbours just north of Botany Bay at Port Jackson and Broken Bay, Phillip conducted an exploratory trip to visit both ports while the First Fleet made early preparations to settle in Botany Bay. He cut short his exploration upon discovering one of the finest harbours in the world and had already prepared to move the fleet to Port Jackson when sails were seen approaching Botany Bay. Greetings and hurried departure (indeed scramble in adverse weather) to Port Jackson ensued. The Lapérouse expedition rested and carried out repairs in Botany Bay.

Lapérouse had learned of the First Fleet by dispatch sent over the Great Siberian Trek. At this time he was refurbishing his small fleet at Kamchatka Peninsula in Russia's Far East. The dispatch however sent Laperouse rapidly south to check out the importance of this colonial site, and he arrived within days of the First Fleet. Governor Arthur Phillip had already decamped from Botany Bay and was in process of leaving for Port Jackson only a few miles to the north.

== Voyage itinerary ==
=== Chile and Hawaii ===
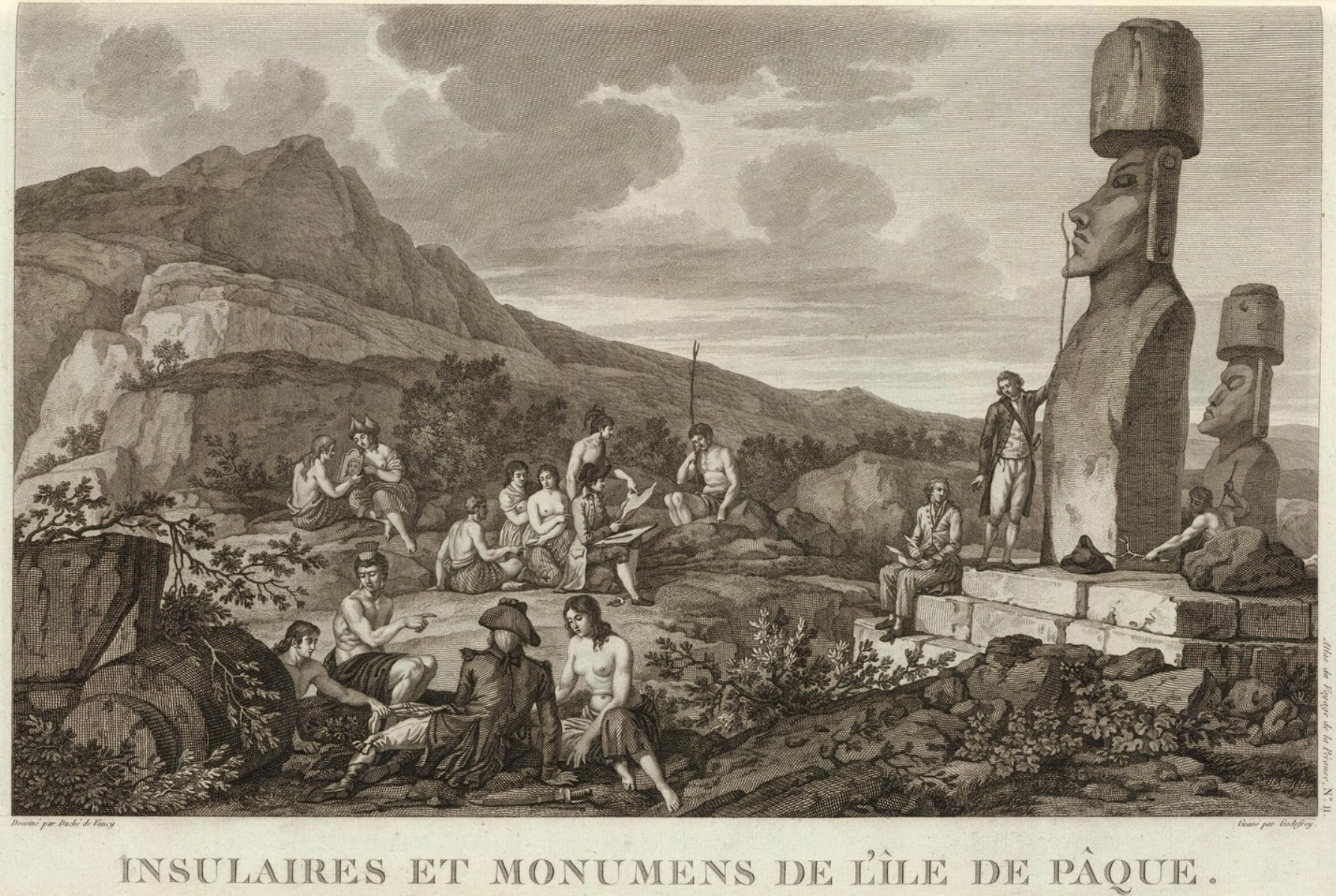
Easter Island in 1786

Lapérouse and his 220 men left Brest on 1 August 1785, rounded Cape Horn, and investigated the Spanish colonial government in the Captaincy General of Chile. He arrived on 9 April 1786 at Easter Island. He then sailed to the Sandwich Islands, the present-day Hawaiian Islands, where he and his crew became the first Europeans to set foot on the island of Maui. James Cook had charted the island in 1778 and traded with the natives on Cook's ships.

=== Alaska ===
Lapérouse sailed on to Alaska, where he landed near Mount Saint Elias in late June 1786 and explored the environs. On 13 July 1786 a barge and two longboats, carrying 21 men, were lost in the heavy currents of the bay called Port des Français by Lapérouse, but now known as Lituya Bay. The men visited the Tlingit people. This encounter was dramatized briefly in episode 13 of Carl Sagan's Cosmos: A Personal Voyage. Next, he headed south, exploring the northwest coast, including the outer islands of present-day British Columbia.

=== California ===
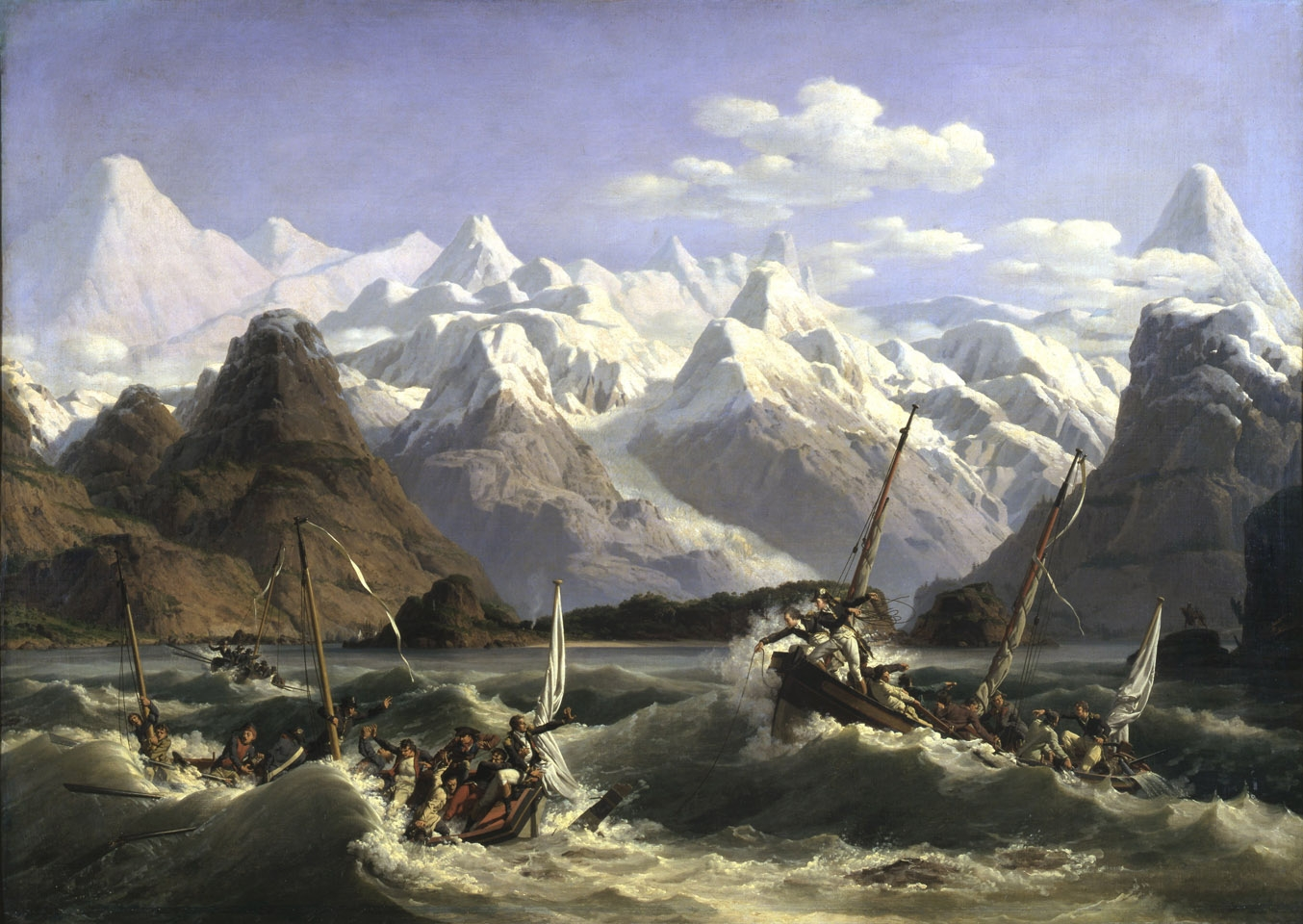
Lapérouse in Alaska, July 1786, by Louis-Philippe Crépin

Lapérouse sailed between 10 and 30 August all the way south to the Spanish Las Californias Province, present-day California. He reportedly observed the only historical eruption of Mount Shasta on 7 September 1786, although this account is now discredited. He stopped at the Presidio of San Francisco long enough to create an outline map of the Bay Area, Plan du port de St. François, situé sur la côte de la Californie septentrionale ("Map of the port of San Francisco, situated on the coast of Northern California"), which was reproduced as Map 33 in L. Aubert's 1797 Atlas du voyage de La Pérouse. He arrived in Monterey Bay and at the Presidio of Monterey on 14 September 1786. He examined the Spanish settlements, ranchos, and missions. He reported, "The country of the Ecclemachs extends above 20 leagues to the [south-]eastward of Monterey." He made critical notes on the missionary treatment of the California indigenous peoples with the Indian Reductions at the Franciscan run missions. Lapérouse likened conditions at a mission to a slave plantation. France and Spain were on friendly terms at this time. Lapérouse was the first non-Spanish visitor to California since Drake in 1579, and the first to come to California after the founding of Spanish missions and presidios (military forts).

=== East Asia ===
Lapérouse again crossed the Pacific Ocean in 100 days, arriving at Macau, where he sold the furs acquired in Alaska, dividing the profits among his men. The next year, on 9 April 1787, after a visit to Manila, he set out for the northeast Asian coasts. He saw the island of Quelpart, in the Korean Peninsula (present-day Cheju in South Korea), which had been visited by Europeans only once before when a group of Dutchmen shipwrecked there in 1635. He visited the Asian mainland coasts of Korea.

=== Japan and Russia ===
Lapérouse then sailed northward to Northeast Asia and Oku-Yeso Island, present day Sakhalin Island, Russia. The Ainu people, Oku-Yeso Island residents, drew him a map showing: their second domain of Yezo Island, present day Hokkaidō Island, Japan; and the coasts of Tartary, Russia on mainland Asia. Lapérouse wanted to sail north through the narrow Strait of Tartary between Oku-Yeso Island and mainland Asia, but failed. Instead, he turned south, and then sailed east through La Pérouse Strait, between Oku-Yeso Island (Sakhalin) and Yezo (Hokkaidō), where he met more Ainu in their third domain of the Kuril Islands, and explored.

Lapérouse then sailed north and reached Petropavlovsk on the Russian Kamchatka peninsula on 7 September 1787. Here they rested from their trip, and enjoyed the hospitality of the Russians and Kamchatkans. In letters received from Paris, Lapérouse was ordered to investigate the settlement the British were establishing in New South Wales, Australia. Barthélemy de Lesseps, son of the French vice consul at Kronstadt, Russia, who had joined the expedition as an interpreter, disembarked in Petropavlovsk to bring the expedition's ships' logs, charts, and letters to France, which he reached after a year-long, epic journey across Siberia and Russia.

=== South Pacific ===
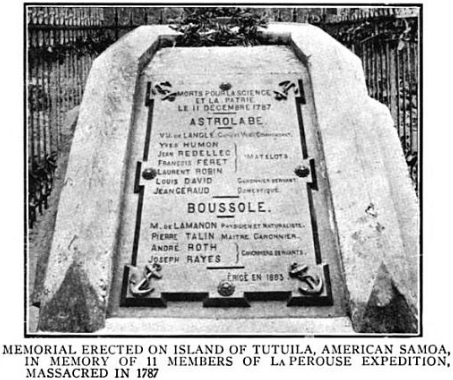
Laperouse expedition memorial in Aʻasu, American Samoa.

Lapérouse next stopped in the Navigator Islands (Samoa), on 6 December 1787. Just before he left, the Samoans attacked a group of his men at Massacre Bay, killing twelve, among whom were Lamanon and de Langle, commander of L'Astrolabe. Twenty men were wounded. The expedition drifted to Tonga, for resupply and help, and later recognized the île Plistard and Norfolk Island.

=== Australia ===
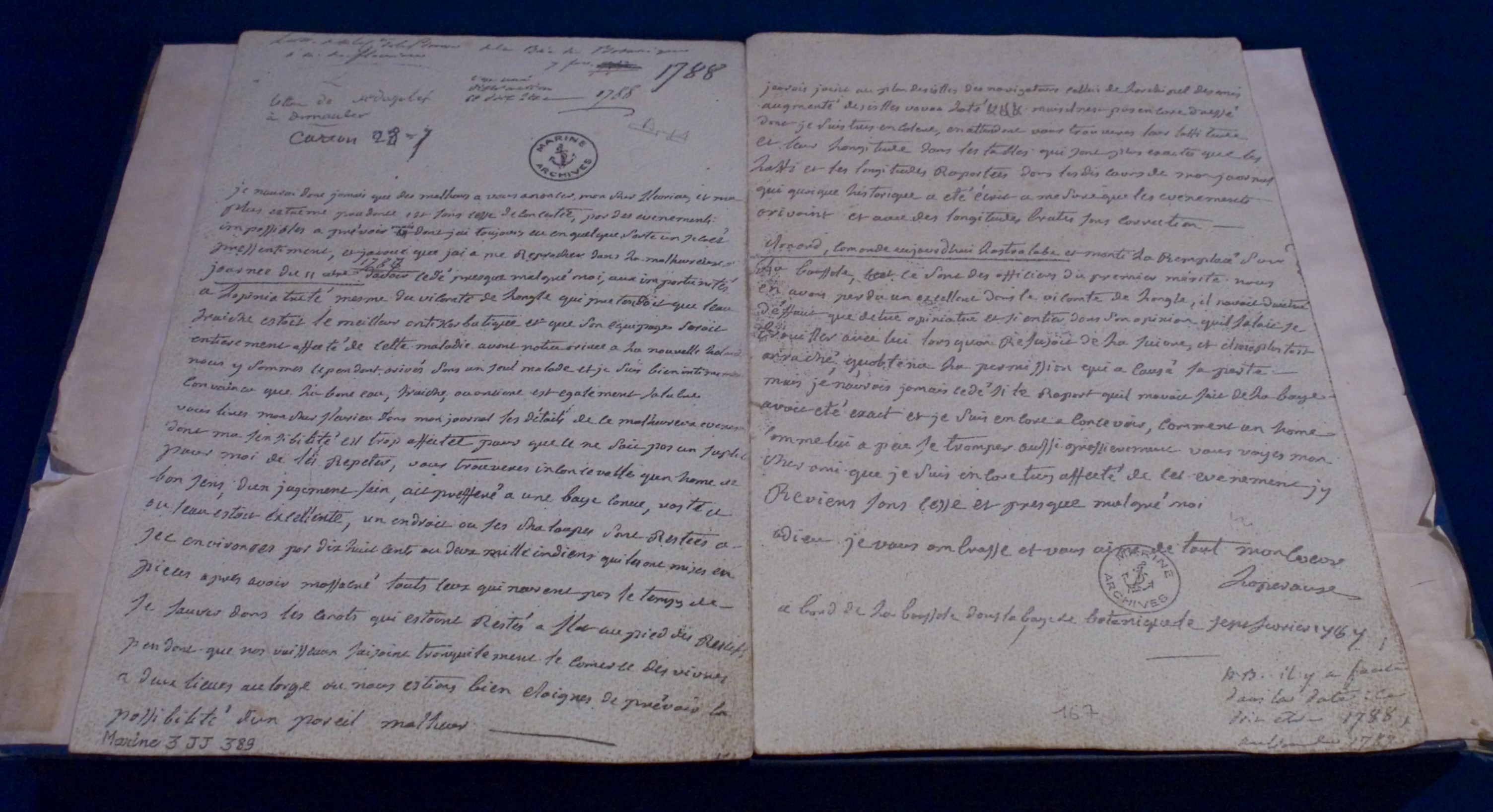
The final letter by Lapérouse received in France. The document was carried to Europe from New South Wales in 1788 by the British ship Alexander, which had been part of the First Fleet carrying convicts to Australia.

The expedition continued to Australia, arriving off Botany Bay on 24 January 1788. There Lapérouse encountered a British convoy (known later as the "First Fleet") led by Captain Arthur Phillip RN, who was to establish the penal colony of New South Wales. While it had been British pretense that they intended that the colony would be located at Botany Bay, it was well established in secret that the Bay site was unsuitable and the colony would instead be established at Sydney Cove in Port Jackson. High winds—which had hindered Lapérouse's ships in entering Botany Bay—delayed the relocation until 26 January (later commemorated as Australia Day).

The French were received courteously and spent six weeks at the British colony (this would be their last recorded landfall). While Lapérouse and Phillip did not meet, French and British officers visited each other formally on at least 11 occasions, and offered each other assistance and supplies. The senior French officer to visit Sydney Cove and wait upon Governor Phillip was Robert Sutton de Clonard, Captain of the Astrolabe, who took despatches to him for forwarding to the French ambassador in London by the returning Alexander transport. Clonard was an Irishman (from Wexford) in the French service, "esteemed for his bravery, and beloved for his humanity". After de Langle had been killed during the expedition's visit to Tutuila, he had succeeded him as commander of the Astrolabe.

During their stay, the French established an observatory and a garden, held masses, and made geological observations. Lapérouse also took the opportunity to send journals, charts and letters back to Europe, with the British merchant ship Alexander, which had come to Sydney as part of the First Fleet. The chaplain from L'Astrolabe, Father Louis Receveur, never recovered from injuries he had sustained in a clash with indigenous people in the Samoan Islands and died at Botany Bay on 17 February; Receveur was buried on shore at Frenchman's Cove.

On 10 March, after taking on sufficient wood and fresh water, the French expedition left New South Wales—bound for New Caledonia, Santa Cruz, the Solomons, the Louisiades, and the western and southern coasts of Australia. While Lapérouse had reported in a letter from Port Jackson that he expected to be back in France by June 1789, neither he nor any members of his expedition were seen again by Europeans. Louis XVI is recorded as having asked, on the morning of his execution in January 1793, "Any news of La Pérouse?"

Documents that had been relayed to France from Lapérouse's expedition were published in Paris in 1797, under the title Voyage de La Pérouse autour du monde ("The voyage of La Pérouse around the world"). In 1825, another French naval officer, Captain Hyacinthe de Bougainville, founded the Lapérouse Monument at Frenchman's Bay, near Receveur's grave. The bay later became part of the suburb of La Perouse. The anniversary of Receveur's death, Lapérouse Day (on varying dates in February/March) and Bastille Day (14 July) have long been marked at the monument (along with Bougainville).

== Epilogue ==
=== Rescue mission of d'Entrecasteaux ===
On 25 September 1791, Rear Admiral Antoine Bruni d'Entrecasteaux departed Brest in search of Lapérouse. His expedition followed Lapérouse's proposed path through the islands northwest of Australia while at the same time making scientific and geographic discoveries. The expedition consisted of two ships, Recherche and Espérance.

In May 1793, Entrecasteaux sighted Santa Cruz, now part of the Solomon Islands, and another, uncharted, island to the southeast; this island was Vanikoro. The French did not approach Vanikoro, only recording it on their charts before sailing away to explore the Solomon Islands further. Two months later, Entrecasteaux died of scurvy. The botanist Jacques Labillardière, attached to the expedition, eventually returned to France and published his account, Relation du voyage à la recherche de La Pérouse, in 1800.

Franco-British relations deteriorated during the French Revolution, and unfounded rumours spread in France blaming the British for the tragedy which had occurred in the vicinity of the new colony. Before the mystery was solved, the French government had published the records of the voyage as far as Kamchatka: Voyage de La Pérouse autour du monde, 1–4 (Paris, 1797). These volumes are still used for cartographic and scientific information about the Pacific. Three English translations were published in 1798–99.

=== Discovery of the expedition ===
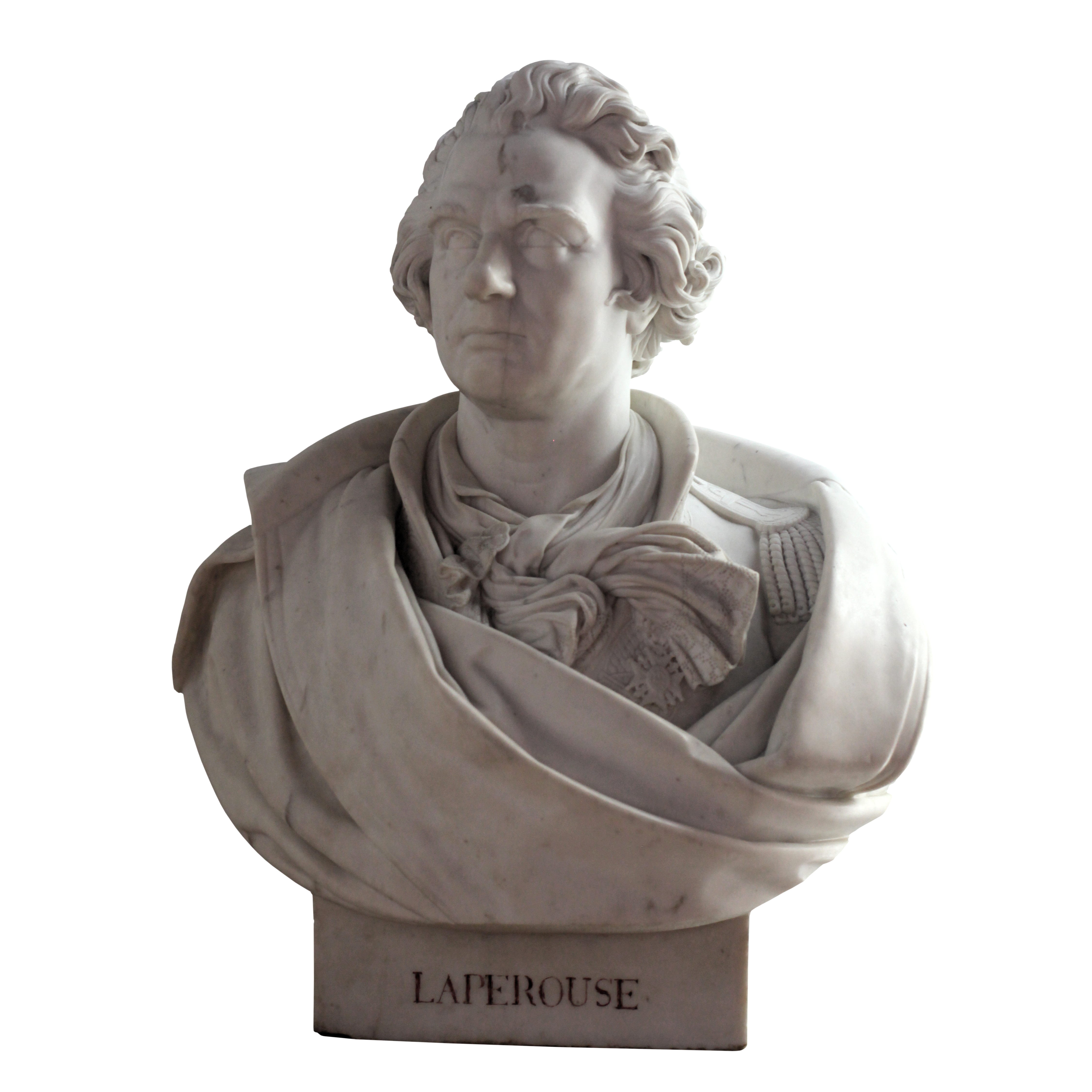
Posthumous bust of Lapérouse in 1828, by François Rude

In 1825 Royal Navy Captain Thomas Manby brought a report, supported by presumptive evidence, that the spot where Lapérouse and his crew had perished was now ascertained. An English whaler discovered a long and low island, surrounded by innumerable breakers, situated between New Caledonia and New Guinea, at nearly an equal distance from each island. The inhabitants came on board the whaler, and one of the chiefs had a cross of St. Louis hanging as an ornament from one of his ears. Other natives had swords, on which the word 'Paris' was engraved, and some were observed to have medals of Louis XVI. One of the chiefs, aged about fifty, said that when he was young, a large ship was wrecked on a coral reef during a violent gale. During his voyage, Manby had seen several medals of the same kind, which Lapérouse had distributed among the natives of California; and Lapérouse, on his departure from Botany Bay, intimated that he intended to steer from the northern part of New Holland (Australia), and explore that archipelago.

==== 1826 expedition ====
It was not until 1826 that an Irish sea captain, Peter Dillon, found enough evidence to piece together the events of the tragedy. In Tikopia (one of the islands of Santa Cruz), he bought some swords that he had reason to believe had belonged to Lapérouse or his officers. He made enquiries and found that they came from nearby Vanikoro, where two big ships had broken up years earlier. Dillon managed to obtain a ship in Bengal and sailed for Vanikoro, where he found cannonballs, anchors and other evidence of the remains of ships in water between coral reefs. A Tikopin by the name of Pu Ratia showed Dillon and his crew the direction to sail to Vanikoro. He was on board as well with a European by the name of Bushat who lived in Tikopia before the third trip of Dillon to Tikopia.

Dillon brought several of these artifacts back to Europe, as did Dumont d'Urville in 1828. Lesseps, the only member of the original expedition still alive at the time, identified them as all belonging to Astrolabe. From the information Vanikoro inhabitants gave Dillon, a rough reconstruction could be made of the disaster that struck Lapérouse. Dillon's reconstruction was later confirmed by the discovery and subsequent examination, in 1964, of what was believed to be the shipwreck of Boussole.

==== 2005 expedition ====
In May 2005, the shipwreck examined in 1964 was formally identified as that of Boussole. The 2005 expedition had embarked aboard Jacques Cartier, a ship of the French Navy. The ship supported a multi-discipline scientific team assembled to investigate the "Mystery of Lapérouse". The mission was named "Opération Vanikoro—Sur les traces des épaves de Lapérouse 2005" (Operation Vanikoro—Tracing the Lapérouse wrecks 2005).

==== 2008 expedition ====
A further similar mission was mounted in 2008.

The 2008 expedition showed the commitment of France, in conjunction with the New Caledonian Association Salomon, to seek further answers about Lapérouse's mysterious fate. It received the patronage of the President of the French Republic as well as the support and co-operation of the French Ministry of Defence, the Ministry of Higher Education and Research, and the Ministry of Culture and Communication.

Preparation for this, the eighth expedition sent to Vanikoro, took 24 months. It brought together more technological resources than previously and involved two ships, 52 crew members and almost 30 scientists and researchers. On 16 September 2008, two French Navy ships set out for Vanikoro from Nouméa (New Caledonia), and arrived on 15 October, thus recreating a section of the final voyage of discovery undertaken more than 200 years earlier by Lapérouse. (Note: On 8 September, Mr. Patrick Buffet took part in the press conference organised at the Press Club de France to launch Opération Lapérouse 2008, which was attended by Admiral Jean-Louis Battet.)

== Fate ==
Both ships had been wrecked on Vanikoro's reefs, Boussole first. Astrolabe was unloaded and taken apart. A group of men, probably the survivors of Boussole, were massacred by the local inhabitants. According to the islanders, some surviving sailors built a two-masted craft from the wreckage of Astrolabe and left in a westward direction about nine months later, but what happened to them is unknown. Also, two men, one a "chief" and the other his servant, had remained behind, but had left Vanikoro a few years before Dillon arrived.

Sven Wahlroos, in his 1989 book, Mutiny and Romance in the South Seas, suggests that there was a narrowly missed chance to rescue one or more of the survivors in 1791. In November 1790, Captain Edward Edwards—in command of HMS Pandora—had sailed from England with orders to comb the Pacific for the mutineers of HMS Bounty. In March of the following year, Pandora arrived at Tahiti and picked up 14 Bounty crewmen who had stayed on that island. Although some of the 14 had not joined the mutiny, all were imprisoned and shackled in a cramped "cage" built on the deck, which the men grimly nicknamed "Pandora's Box". Pandora then left Tahiti in search of Bounty and the leader of the mutiny, Fletcher Christian.

Captain Edwards' search for the remaining mutineers ultimately proved fruitless. However, when passing Vanikoro on 13 August 1791, he observed smoke signals rising from the island. Edwards, single-minded in his search for Bounty and convinced that mutineers fearful of discovery would not be advertising their whereabouts, ignored the smoke signals and sailed on.

Wahlroos argues that the smoke signals were almost certainly a distress message sent by survivors of the Lapérouse expedition, which later evidence indicated were still alive on Vanikoro at that time—three years after Boussole and Astrolabe had foundered. Wahlroos is "virtually certain" that Captain Edwards, whom he characterizes as one of England's most "ruthless", "inhuman", "callous", and "incompetent" naval captains, missed his chance to become "one of the heroes of maritime history" by solving the mystery of the lost Lapérouse expedition.

== Legacy ==
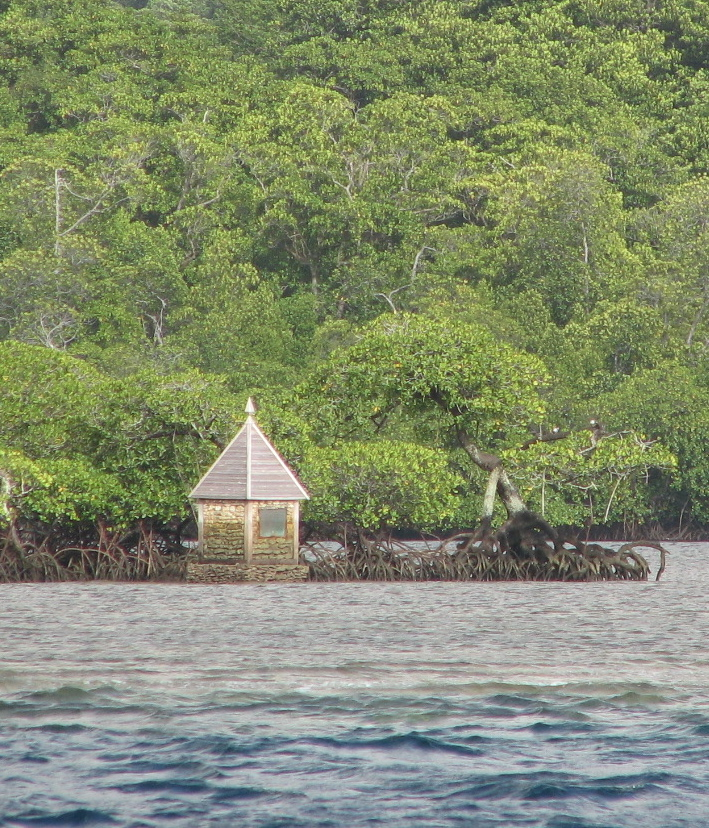
Memorial to Lapérouse on Vanikoro in the Solomon Islands

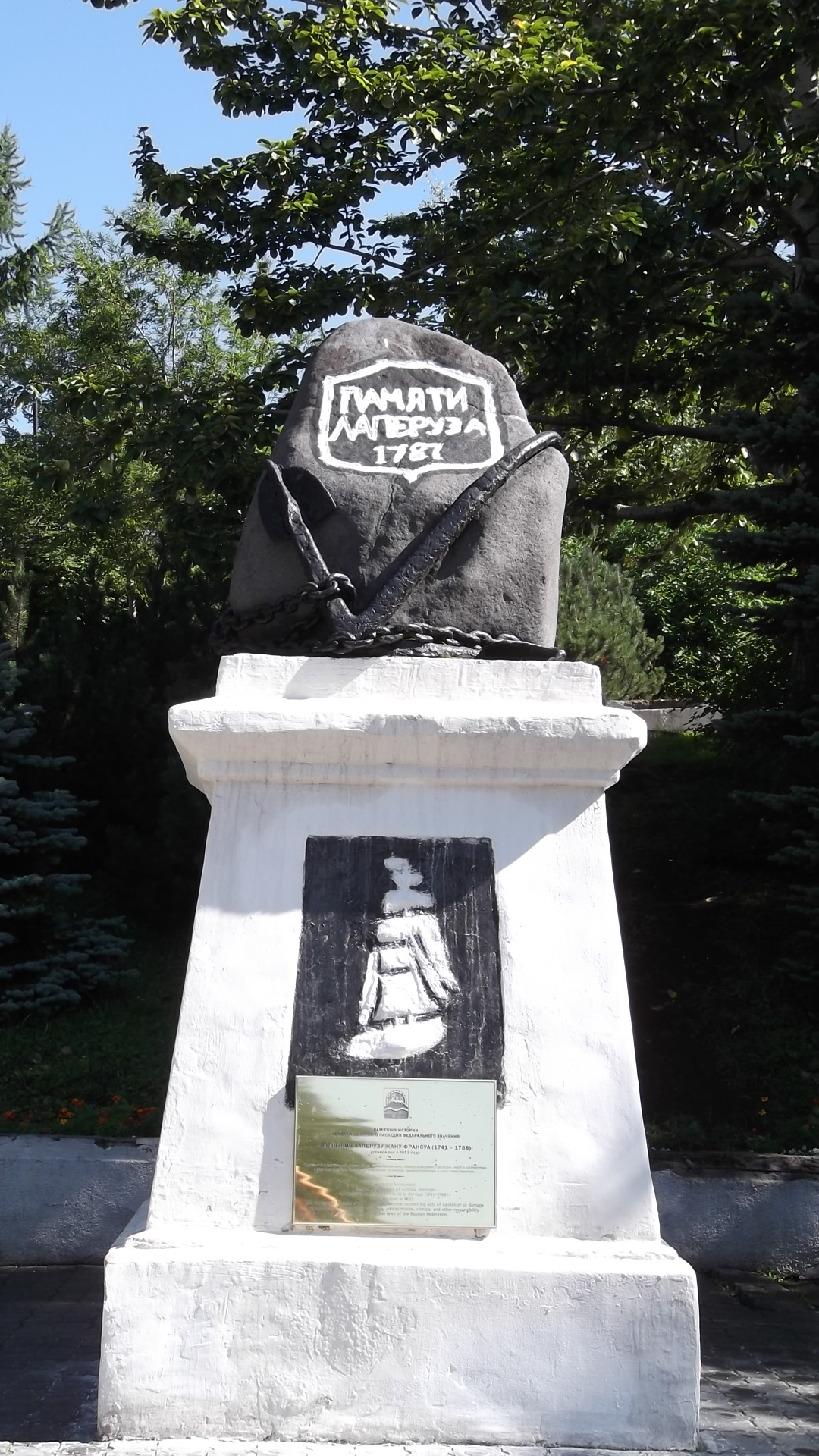
Memorial to Lapérouse in Petropavlovsk-Kamchatsky, Kamchatka

=== Museum collections ===
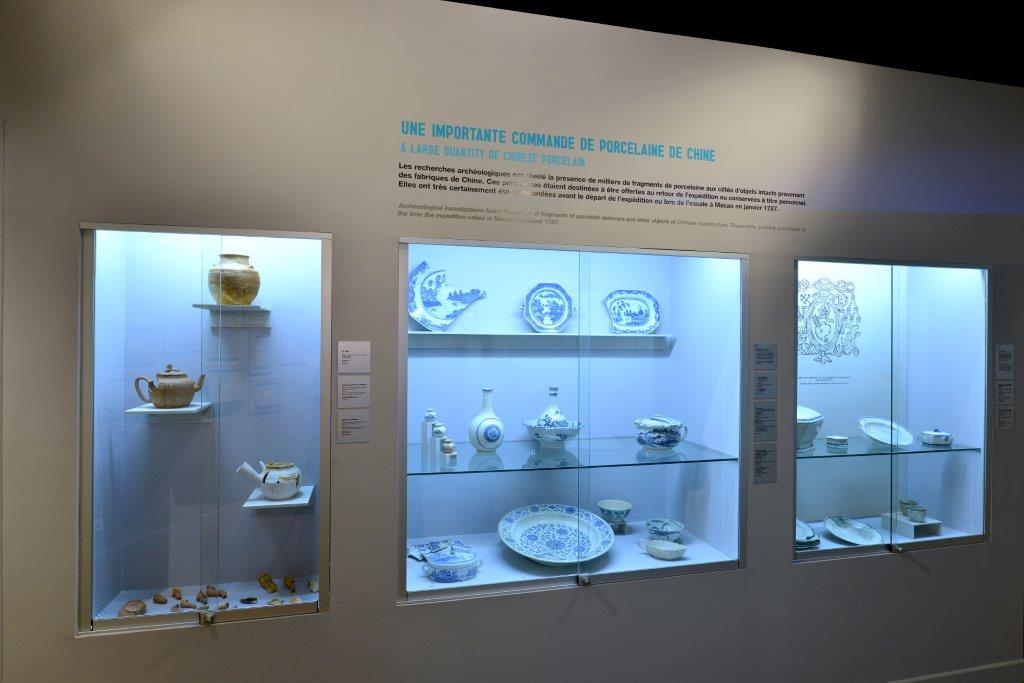
Recovered ceramics on display at the Maritime Museum of New Caledonia in Nouméa, New Caledonia

Objects relating to the life and voyages of Lapérouse are held at The Lapérouse Museum in Albi in southern France, and the Maritime Museum of New Caledonia. Both museums contain objects recovered from the ships Astrolabe and Boussole. There is also the Lapérouse Museum in La Perouse, which records his time in Australia.

=== Places named after Lapérouse ===
Places later named in honour of Lapérouse include:

- Mount La Perouse (3231 m) and La Perouse Glacier, Fairweather Range, Alaska
- Mount La Pérouse (1127 m) on Haida Gwaii, British Columbia
- La Pérouse Reef off the west coast of Haida Gwaii, British Columbia
- La Perouse Bank, Off the West Coast of Vancouver Island / West of Ucluelet/Tofino. This is the site of Environment Canada weather buoy 46206, at location 48.83N 126.00W
- La Perouse Strait between Hokkaidō and Sakhalin
- Mount La Perouse (1157 m) and the La Perouse Range, Tasmania, Australia
- La Perouse Pinnacle (37 m), in the French Frigate Shoals, Hawaii
- La Perouse (New Zealand) (3078 m), in New Zealand's Southern Alps
- La Perouse Glacier, Westland, New Zealand
- La Perouse Bay, site of his landing on Maui
- La Perouse Bay (Easter Island)
- La Perouse, a suburb of Sydney, Australia, on the northern headland of Botany Bay
- La Perouse Street, a main street in the suburb of Griffith in Canberra, Australia. There is a statue of La Perouse at the northern end of La Perouse Street at the Red Hill shopping centre.
- La Pérouse (crater), on the Moon
- Rue La Pérouse, a street in the 16th arrondissement of Paris

=== Ships named after Lapérouse ===
- Several ships of the French navy have been named after him.
- CMA CGM Laperouse, a 13,800 TEU container ship operated by the French container transportation and shipping company CMA CGM
- Le Lapérouse, lead ship of the Compagnie du Ponant's Explorer class of cruise ships

=== Lapérouse in literature and film ===
The fate of Lapérouse, his ships and his men are the subjects of a chapter in the 1870 novel Twenty Thousand Leagues Under the Seas by Jules Verne. Lapérouse was also mentioned in episode "The Quest" of the series Northern Exposure, wherein the character Joel (Rob Morrow) finds an old chart of the French explorer that will lead to a legendary "jewelled city of the North" (New York City).

The novel Landfalls by Naomi J. Williams explores the Lapérouse expedition in depth.

Henry David Thoreau mentions him (as "La Perouse") in his book Walden. In the first chapter, "Economy", when writing about how indispensable it is to cultivate the habits of a businessman in anything one does, Thoreau describes these habits in a very long list, including

... taking advantage of the results of all exploring expeditions, using new passages and all improvements in navigation;—charts to be studied, the position of reefs and new lights and buoys to be ascertained, and ever, and ever, the logarithmic tables to be corrected, for by the error of some calculator the vessel often splits upon a rock that should have reached a friendly pier—there is the untold fate of La Perouse.

Jon Appleton composed a full-length opera based on the final voyage of Lapérouse, Le Dernier Voyage de Jean-Gallup de la Perouse.

=== Monuments ===
In 1989, the Government of Australia commissioned from artist Ante Dabro (working in Australia) a monumental bronze statue of de Galaup, for the French Bicentenary. It was installed at the Promenade d'Australie in Paris.

== See also ==
- List of people who disappeared mysteriously at sea
