= French ship Astrolabe (1781) =

Converted flûte of the French Navy

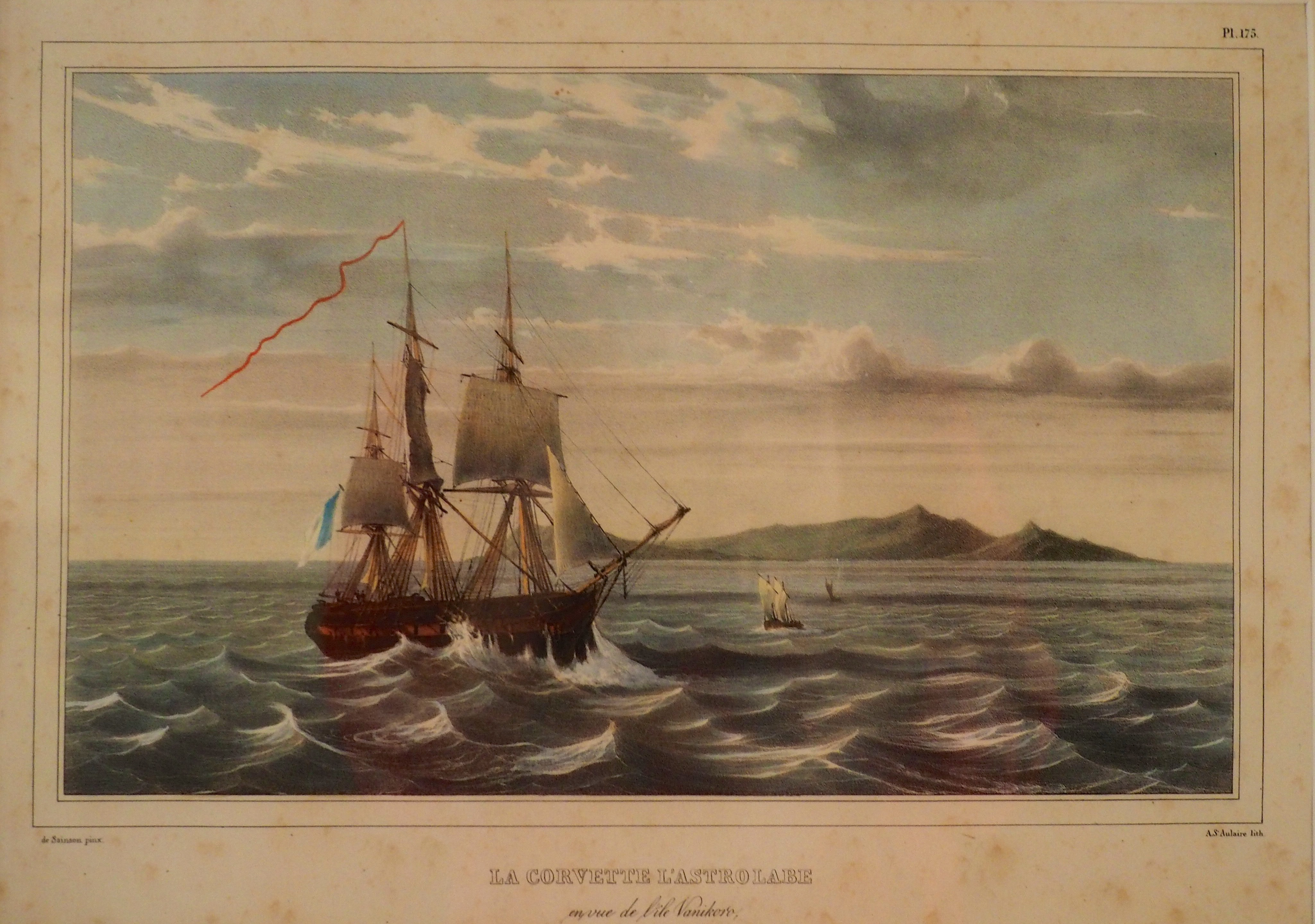
- French Corvette Astrolabe

History

France
- Namesake: Astrolabe instrument
- Builder: Le Havre
- Launched: December 1781
- Christened: Autruche
- Reclassified: Frigate in 1784
- Fate: Wrecked on Vanikoro 1788

General characteristics
- Class & type: Fluyt
- Displacement: c. 500 tonnes
- Length: 38.7 m (127 ft)
- Beam: 8.5 m (28 ft)
- Draught: 5 m (16 ft)
- Propulsion: Sail
- Complement: 10 officers; 100 men
- Armament: 12 6-pounders; 3 x 1-pounders and 20 swivel guns (as converted)
- Armour: Timber

Astrolabe was a converted flûte of the French Navy, famous for her travels with Jean-François de Galaup, comte de Lapérouse.

She was built in 1781 at Le Havre as the flûte Autruche for the French Navy. In May 1785 she and her sister ship Boussole (previously Portefaix) were renamed, rerated as frigates, and fitted for round-the-world scientific exploration. The two ships departed from Brest on 1 August 1785, Boussole commanded by Lapérouse and Astrolabe under Paul Antoine Fleuriot de Langle.

== Disappearance ==
The expedition vanished mysteriously in 1788 after leaving Botany Bay on 10 March 1788. Captain Peter Dillon in Research solved the mystery in 1827 when he found remnants of both ships at Vanikoro Island in the Solomon Islands. Local inhabitants reported that the ships had been wrecked in a storm.

Survivors from one ship had been massacred, while survivors from the other had constructed their own small boat and sailed off the island, never to be heard from again.

== Legacy ==
The fate of Lapérouse, his ships and crew was a subject of mystery for some years. Louis XVI reportedly often inquired whether any news had come from the expedition, up to shortly before his execution. It is also notably the subject of a chapter from Twenty Thousand Leagues Under the Seas, Jules Verne's 1870 novel.

Objects recovered from the wreck are part of the collection of the Maritime Museum of New Caledonia.

== See also ==
- European and American voyages of scientific exploration

== Note ==
Its crew included French priest Louis Receveur, the first Catholic and second non-indigenous person to be buried in Australia.
