= French frigate Boussole (1785) =

History

France
- Name: Boussole
- Launched: 1782
- Fate: Wrecked 1788

Boussole (French pronunciation: [busɔl]) was a former flûte of the French Navy, famous for its exploration of the Pacific under Jean-François de Galaup, comte de Lapérouse.

She was built in 1781–82 at Bayonne as the flûte Portfaix for the French Navy. In May 1785 she and her sister ship Astrolabe (previously the Autruche) were renamed, rerated as frigates, and fitted for round-the-world scientific exploration. It departed Brest on 1 August 1785 under Lapérouse, accompanied by the Astrolabe under Paul Antoine Fleuriot de Langle.

The expedition vanished mysteriously in 1788 after leaving Botany Bay on 10 March 1788. Captain Peter Dillon in Research solved the fate of the expedition when he found remnants of both vessels at Vanikoro Island in the Solomon Islands. Local inhabitants reported that a storm had wrecked both ships. Survivors from one ship had been massacred while survivors from the other ship had constructed their own small boat and sailed off the island, never to be heard from again.

The fate of Lapérouse and his two ships at Vanikoro is the subject of a chapter in Twenty Thousand Leagues Under the Seas by Jules Verne.

Objects recovered from the wreck are held in the collection of the Maritime Museum of New Caledonia.
