= Robert de Lamanon =

French botanist, physicist, geologist, and meteorologist

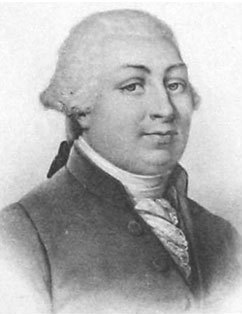
Portrait of Robert de Lamanon.

Jean Honoré Robert de Paul de Lamanon, known as Robert de Lamanon (6 December 1752, Salon-de-Provence – 11 December 1787, Aʻasu, Tutuila, Samoan Islands) was a French botanist, physicist, geologist and meteorologist. He joined several scientific expeditions and eventually died on one (the La Perouse expedition).

== Family ==
He belonged to the lordly family of Lamanon, ennobled in 1572. His father was Jean François de Paul de Lamanon and Anne de Baldony (born in Aix-en-Provence). He had two sisters and an elder brother, Auguste Paul de Lamanon (1748–1820). Auguste was destined for the French Navy by his father, becoming a garde de la marine at Toulon, then an officer.

== Life ==
Robert's brother Auguste left the Navy on his father's death to devote himself to the study of sciences and letters. Robert left holy orders and together they set out on a trip round Europe and the French provinces collecting plants, documents, manuscripts and objets d'art. They perfected their studies in Paris and there met the most famous scholars of the era: Laplace, Jussieu, d'Alembert, the Monge brothers, Volney, Malesherbes, and Condorcet, secretary of the Académie des sciences.

Robert's paper on fossils found in the gypsum formation around Paris, Observations sur la Physique, contributed to practice of turning physical geography into geohistory. The practice was still novel at the time, Nicolas Desmarest (1725–1815) publishing his essay on recognizing prismatic basalt as old lava streams only three years before in 1774.

Reported to be "energetic and full of lively curiosity," on a trip from Paris to England, Robert ordered himself to be tied to the mainmast during a violent storm so that he could contemplate the spectacle.

== Memorial ==
A memorial to La Perouse massacred expedition members was built in 1883 in Aʻasu village on Massacre Bay on the Northwest coast of the island of Tutuila (then — the island of Maouna), Samoan Islands. The monument surmounted by a cross bears the words "Morts pour la Science et la Patrie" ("Those who died for Science and Fatherland") and names of eleven French sailors who were killed in the encounter with the Samoans, among them the name of Robert de Lamanon.

== See also ==
- European and American voyages of scientific exploration
