= King George (ship) =

Multiple British vessels have been named King George for one of the members of the British monarchs:

- King George (1781 ship) was launched on the Thames. She spent about three-quarters of her career sailing for the Hudson's Bay Company (HBC), and then the last quarter of her career as a whaler in the British northern whale fishery. She foundered there without a trace in 1822.
- King George (1783 ship), of 346 tons burthen, was built on the Thames. From 1817 she made three voyages to the British Southern Whale Fishery, and was condemned at Guayaquil in 1824 on her fourth.
- King George (1784 EIC ship) made six voyages for the British East India Company (EIC) between 1785 and 1798. She also participated in the invasion of St Lucia. In 1798 her owners sold her and she became a West Indiaman. An accident in 1800 at Jamaica destroyed her.
- King George (1785 ship) was a British merchant ship engaged in whaling and the maritime fur trade in the late 18th century. She was launched in 1785 and taken up by the King George's Sound Company. She sailed in 1785 on a voyage of exploration, together with the Queen Charlotte. The two vessels whaled in the South Seas and sought furs in the Pacific Northwest. They returned to England via Canton, where they picked up cargoes for the British East India Company (EIC). Their voyage accomplished a circumnavigation of the world. On her return new owners apparently sailed her between Britain and South Carolina. She is no longer listed after 1796.
- King George (1787 ship) was launched in France in 1775 under another name, possibly as Enterprize. She became a Bristol-based slave ship in the triangular trade in enslaved people. Under the name Sally she made three voyages between 1783 and 1786 transporting enslaved people. Then from 1787 on as King George she made three more complete voyages transporting enslaved people. She was lost at Barbados in 1791 on her seventh voyage with the loss of 280 of the 360 captives on board.
- King George (1797 ship) was a French ship that the British captured circa 1797. Her new owners renamed her and employed her as a Liverpool-based slave ship. She made three complete voyages in the triangular trade, transporting enslaved peoples from Africa to the West Indies. She was lost on her fourth voyage in February 1803 as she returned to Liverpool after having delivered captives to Havana.
- King George Packet (1802 Berwick ship) was launched in 1802 in Berwick-on-Tweed for the Old Shipping Company of Berwick. She sailed as a packet between Leith and London until 1825, when she became a Leith-based coaster. She then was unlisted for two years, reappearing in 1828 with new owners. She sailed between London and the Continent and was last listed in 1833.
- King George Packet (1802 Dover ship) may have been the vessel that on 28 December 1804 HMS Musquito sent into Yarmouth Roads. She was a large smuggling vessel carrying 1400 half-ankers of liquor, and some tobacco. The smuggler was the former Harwich King George Packet that the Dutch had detained at the beginning of the war. Lloyd's List (LL) had reported on 31 May 1803 that Earl of Leicester, Princess Royal, and King George Packet had been detained at Helvöet. Captain Flynn and six of his men cut out an open boat and sailed to Yarmouth. The smuggler was named Aurora and she and her cargo were sold at auction on 9 July 1805. The auction notice gave her burthen as 8622/94 tons, her length as 64 ft 4 in (19.6 m), and her breadth as 18 ft 3 in (5.6 m). A listing of Harwich packets from the 1814 volume of LR listed a King George Packet launched at Dover in 1802, gave her burthen as 82 tons, and her armament as six 6-pounder guns. (Note: The Harwich packets sailed between Harwich and Hellevoetsluis until 1805 when the Netherlands fell under Napoleonic control. The Harwich packets tended to be of about 80 tons (bm), and during the French Revolutionary and Napoleonic Wars to be armed with four or later six 4 or 6-pounder guns.)
- HM hired armed cutter King George was a former packet boat of 5847/94 tons (bm), and carried six 4-pounder guns. She served from 30 May 1803 to 15 December 1804, and again from 17 September 1807 until 18 May 1814.
- King George (1805 ship) was built by Kable & Underwood at Sydney in 1805.

== See also ==
- HMS King George V
