= Armagnac Regiment =

Régiment d'Armagnac 6éme Régiment d'Infanterie de Ligne (Armagnac)
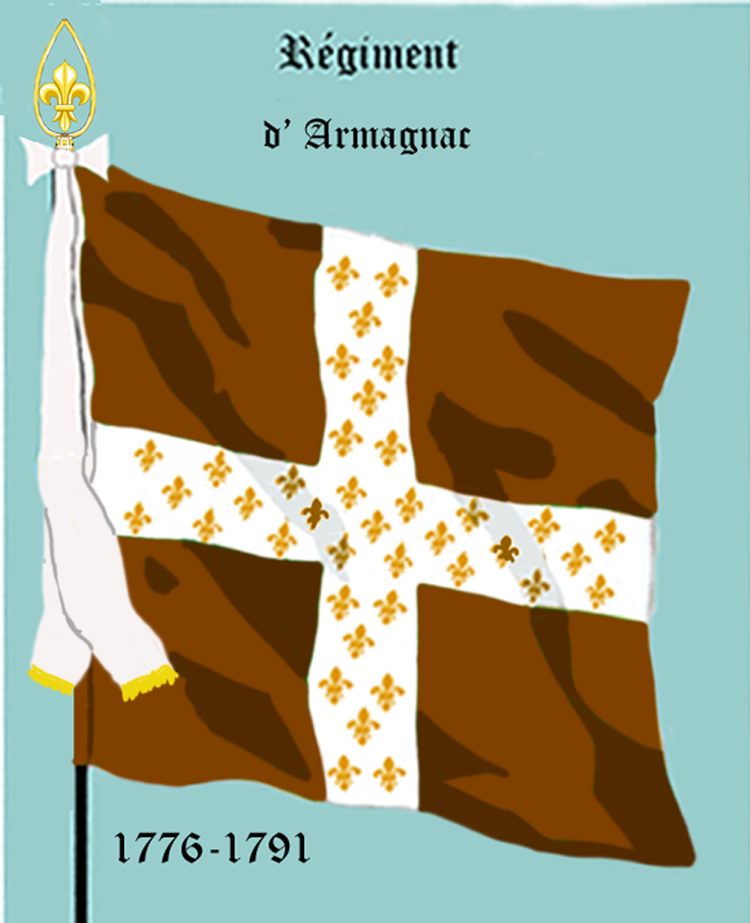
- Regimental colours from formation in 1776 till 1791.
- Active: 1776–1794
- Country: Kingdom of France; French First Republic
- Branch: (Kingdom of France) French Royal Army (French First Republic) French Revolutionary Army
- Type: Line Infantry
- Size: 3 Battalions – 2 Line + 1 Militia
- Headquarters + Depot: Condom-en-Armagnac, Armagnac, Gascony
- Nickname: fr:"Diabolicum" en:"Diabolical"
- Engagements: Anglo French War; Siege of Savannah; Battle of Martinique; Invasion of Tobago; Battle of the Saintes; Hudson Bay expedition; War of the First Coalition; Flanders Campaign; First Siege of Mainz; Second Siege of Mainz; War in the Vendée

The Armagnac Regiment (French: Régiment d'Armagnac) was a line infantry regiment of the French Royal Army raised in 1776, which served during the American Revolutionary War and War of the First Coalition until it was disbanded in 1794. Just two years after formation, the regiment would serve during the Anglo-French War seeing action in both North America and the Caribbean. Following their return, a brief period of peace followed until the revolution and subsequent war, which saw the regiment's lineage discontinued.

== Formation ==
When Louis XV reviewed the French Royal Army after the end of the disastrous Seven Years' War, he insisted all regiments be equipped and organised the same way. This not only would help save money, but would help the army become a better force overall by completely reorganising the regimental system and standard doctrine. These reforms were pioneered by the late Maurice, Duc de Saxe (Duke of Saxony), who had served in the Seven Years' War with great distinction.

As a result, all infantry regiments of more than two battalions, with some notable exceptions, were divided. The 1st and 3rd battalions disbanded and reformed the old regiment while the 2nd and 4th battalions formed a new provincial regiment and granted a number of precedence just after the former.

Under the 1776 ordnance, the regimental structure and strengths were also altered. Each battalion would comprise (from right to left of the line): Company of Grenadiers (Compagnie des Grenadiers), 4 x Fusilier Companies (Compagnie des Fusiliers), Company of Chasseurs (Compagnie de Chasseurs) and a Company of Auxiliaries (Compagnie des Auxiliaires).

Each company of Grenadiers would consist of: 1 x Captain, 1 x Second Captain, 1 x First Lieutenant, 1 x Second Lieutenant, 6 x Sub-Lieutenants (Port Drapeau), 1 x Sergeant Majors, 1 x Caporal-Fourrier, 4 x Sergeants, 8 x Corporals, 1 x Cadet Genleman, 1 x Frater (padre), 84 x Grenadiers, 2 x Drummers or other instruments, totalling 180 men, including the officers.

The Fusilier Companies and Chasseur Company would be comprise a Second Colonel, 1 x Lieutenant Colonel, 1 x Captain Commander, 1 x Second Captain, 1 x First Lieutenant, 1 x Second Lieutenant, 2 x Second Lieutenants, 1 x Sergeant-Major, 1 x Caporal Fourrier, 5 x Sergeants, 10 x Corporals, 1 x Cadet Gentleman, 1 x Frater (padre), 144 x Fusiliers, 2 x Drummers or other instruments (2 x Buglers for the Chasseurs), totalling 171 men, including the officers.

One of the regiments selected to split was the Régiment de Navarre. The 2nd and 4th battalions of that regiment then separated to form the new Régiment d'Armagnac, named after the historic province, today part of the departments of Gers, Landes, and Lot-et-Garonne.

On formation, the regiment adopted the following uniforms published on 21 May 1776: White jacket, white small coat, black tricorne with white trim and a bourbon white bow tie, sky blue facings, sky blue lapels, aurora collars, sky blue cuffs, and white buttons.

== Anglo-French War ==
Following the formation of the regiment, the 2nd (former 4th Battalion, Navarre) was based in Guadeloupe, while the 1st Battalion had gone to Calais in June 1776, it then passed from there to Dinan and Saint-Servan in October, in September 1777 to Brest, and there on 9 October embarked for the West Indies. On 18 December 1778, the two battalions joined for the first time and took part in the disastrous Capture of St. Lucia, where Captain de Villers was killed, while Lieutenant Colonel Feydeau de Saint-Christophe, Lieutenant de Servilange, and Second Lieutenant des Ecures were wounded.

=== Siege of Savannah ===
Towards the end of 1779, Continental forces were eager to re-take Savannah, Georgia, which had become a launching point for British raids in the area. In communication with the Continental Commander, Southern Department/Army Benjamin Lincoln, a large raid was to be conducted against the city. As Jean-Baptiste Charles, Comte d'Estaing arrived with his squadron near the Georgia coast, a small French ground force joined them. This force consisted of personnel from several infantry and colonial regiments, along with a detachment of artillery. As the squadron neared the city, it was required to stay away due to the naval batteries and possible heavy artillery, while the rest of the troops were ordered to some 5 miles away and marched to join their American allies.

On 15 September the first trenches were dug, and on 24 September the Allies vigorously repulsed an attempted breakout by the British. On 9 October they were again attacked, but after a fierce battle, Lieutenants Molard and Nairne de Stanlay were killed, the French were repulsed and the siege called off entirely. The regiment then re-embark for the West Indies, leaving Captains Voulan, Grillières, and Bonnier seriously wounded.

=== South Indies ===
After their terrible expedition to Georgia, in 1780, part of the regiment boarded ships of the squadron of Lieutenant Général des Armées Navales Luc du Bouëxic, Comte de Guichen, which had orders to immediately set sail for the West Indies. On 17 April to the leeward of Martinique, the fleet met a force under Admiral George Rodney, 1st Baron Rodney, which led to the Battle of Martinique, and ended in a French victory. The squadron then saw two inconclusive actions on 15 May and 19 May 1780, with the battalion acting as marines. In mid 1780, the squadron was ordered back to France, but the battalion disembarked in Martinique and remained there on garrison duties.

In 1781, 150 grenadiers and chasseurs embarked on 8 May with the squadron of the Comte de Grasse, and took part in the successful Invasion of Tobago. Captains Tarragon and Ristainy stood out during the invasion especially.

==== Battle of the Saintes ====
French and British ships during the Battle of the Saintes, where a detachment of the Armagnac regiment served as marines.

In 1782, a detachment embarked in the beginning of the year with Armand, Comte de Kersaint's squadron as part of his effort to recapture the Dutch colonies of Demerara (1 February) and Essequibo (5 December). A second detachment, detached to the Comte de Grasse's Fleet fought during the infamous Battle of the Saintes off Dominica. Lieutenant La Brosse and Colour-Bearer Dumarchais were wounded on the Languedoc, Second-Lieutenant Tenneguy on La Couronne, and Captain d'Aymard de Villé was very seriously wounded on the Diadème.

==== Sainte-Christophe ====
During the campaign in the south, the main part of the regiment contributed to the French Invasion of Saint Christophe, where among those cited for gallantry, included Colonel de Livarot, Lieutenant Colonel Feydcau, Captains Tarragon and de Grillières, Lieutenants Dumont, des Ecures, Charpy, and Descressonnières.

=== Hudson Bay Expedition ===
During the summer of 1782, the renowned French Admiral Jean-François de Galaup, comte de Lapérouse was preparing a secret, and daring expedition into the heart of British Canada. This small expedition consisted of a ship of the line (74 gun Sceptre), 2 frigates (36 gun ships l'Astrée and the Engageante), along with 250 grenadiers and chasseurs of the Régiment d'Armagnac and Auxerrois regiments, with 40 gunners of the Régiment de Metz. Fortunately, the expedition arrived in the Hudson bay on 17 July, but scarcely had it entered the bay when it was entombed with ice. The expedition eventually arrived inland on 8 August in-front of the Prince of Wales Fort. In 1782, the fort was manned by only 39 (non-military) men at the time, and the fort's Governor, Samuel Hearne. Noticing the bleak reality of the situation, he surrendered without a single shot being fired. The French partially destroyed the fort, but its mostly-intact ruins survive to this day.

After capturing the Prince of Wales Fort, the expedition re-embarked bound for York Factory, the capital of Hudson's Bay Company. On 21 August they disembarked yet again, and after suffering incredibly from fatigue it approached the fort and walked through the gates, which were left open and caused from 2 million pounds of damage (equivalent to almost US$479 Million in 2021). On 1 September the expedition re-embarked and remained in the area under the Peace of Paris in 1783, when the forts were handed back to the British.

== Revolution ==
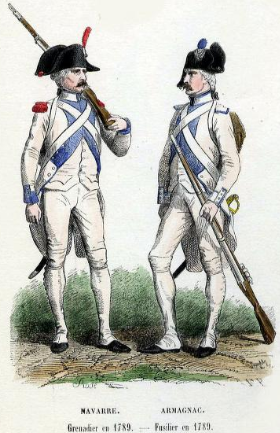
Grenadier of the Navarre Regiment and fusilier of the Armagnac Regiment in 1789 following the 1779 uniform regulations, just before the French Revolution.

After making a name for itself during the wars in the Colonies, the Armagnac regiment returned to France with an overwhelming sense of pride. On 21 July 1783, they landed in Lorient, and thereafter marched to Thionville to re-train, re-equip and recruit back to full establishment. When the 21 February 1779 ordnance was issued, the regiment had been deployed oversees, and therefore wasn't able to gain its new uniforms until the return to France in 1783.

This new ordnance grouped most of the line regiments into 10 'classes' of six regiments each. The exceptions were the Royal regiments, Regiments of the Princes, and the Régiment de Picardie. Each class was divided further into two 'divisions', each of three regiments. In the case of the Armagnac regiment, it was part of the 1st series and 2nd division, and uniformed as follows; white jacket, sky blue facings, sky blue lapels, white cuffs, and white buttons.

In October 1785 the regiment moved to Saarlouis, which it left after a few days to move to Saint-Lô and Valognes, where it would remain for two years. On 1 January 1788 they arrived in Lille and formed part of the Saint-Omer camp in September. In June 1789, as the Storming of the Bastille and beginning of the French Revolution occurred, the regiment moved as far of Soissons to help restore order in Paris before it was stopped, and didn't move again until May 1790, when it was sent to Condé. In October, it moved to Givet and spent the winter there before moving in 1791 to Longwy to assist in the new fortifications being built there. It was here, on 1 April 1791 the regiment was renamed as the 6éme Régiment d'Infanterie de Ligne (Armagnac), although unofficially the Armagnac title remained until its disbandment in 1794.

Following the French Revolution, the provisional regulations of 1 April 1791 grouped all regiments minus the foreign legions into the same uniform category, and the uniform became: white jacket, black facings, black lapels, black cuffs, black trimmed epaulettes, and a black bicorne with the bourbon cockade and white plume.

== War of the First Coalition ==
On 1 May 1792, the regiment arrived back in Thionville, but only stayed for a short time, for as the War of the First Coalition broke out, the regiment moved to Metz and detached its grenadiers from the 1st Battalion to join the new Army of the Ardennes Armée des Ardennes.

=== 1st Battalion ===
The grenadiers of the 1st Battalion, now in the Armée des Ardennes, took part in on 23 May during the Battle of Hamptinne, Battle of Florenne, and Battle of Saint-Aubin. After the retreat of the Prussians, the whole of the 1st Battalion passed to the Army of the North Armée du Nord and contributed to the decisive Siege of Lille. It then served during the Flanders campaign and the Battle of Neerwinden. In April 1793, the regiment entered the garrison at Condé-sur-l'Escaut, where it was captured following the Siege of Condé on 13 July. The regiment was eventually exchanged in 1795, where it then joined the Home Army Armée du Home where the discussion of a new constitution began in Paris leading to insurrection. Under the new constitution, all royalist lineages and attachments were lost, though the 1st Battalion was able to escape being amalgamated as the regiment's supposed successor, 11éme Demi-Brigade, only existed on paper.

The next year, in 1796, the 1st Battalion was finally amalgamated as part of the second round of amalgamations with the 183rd Demi-Brigade, 4th Lot-et-Garonne Volunteers, 6th and 9th Volunteers of the Reserves, 1st Battalion of Manche Volunteers and 4th Battalion of Meuse Volunteers to form the 28éme Demi-Brigade d'Infanterie. This demi-brigade would eventually reform the old 28th Infantry Regiment in 1803, previously the Régiment de Maine.

=== 2nd Battalion ===
When the 1st Battalion joined the Armée du Nord, the 2nd Battalion was left in Metz in 1792, but joined in the Defence of Thionville, where Lieutenant Colonel Berthaut was seriously wounded by a bomb on 6 September. During the short siege, a small force of 3,000-4,000 French troops held off some 20,000 Austrian and Emigre forces. Because the Allied forces thought the small fortress would give up easily, no siege artillery had been brought forward. Just two days after the blockade began, the Allied forces left.

==== Palatinate Campaign ====
The 2nd Battalion also contributed to General Adam Philippe, Comte de Custine's Army of the Rhine Armée du Rhin and its conquest of the Palatinate and was garrisoned in Mainz after this successful campaign. After the Defence of the City later that year, the battalion remained in the city until the capitulation of the garrison the next year. The Prussians carelessly paroled the garrison on the promise not to fight against the Coalition armies for one year. It was noted that the terms did not prevent the troops from being used to fight the Vendeans, so the parolees were hurried west. These 14,000 well-disciplined soldiers became the unofficially named Army of Mayence under Jean-Baptiste du Bayet. They were soon fighting with the Army of the Coasts of Brest under Jean Baptiste Canclaux near Nantes.

The battalion remained in the area until the end of the year when it was transferred to the Vendée as the Vendée Insurrection began to explode.

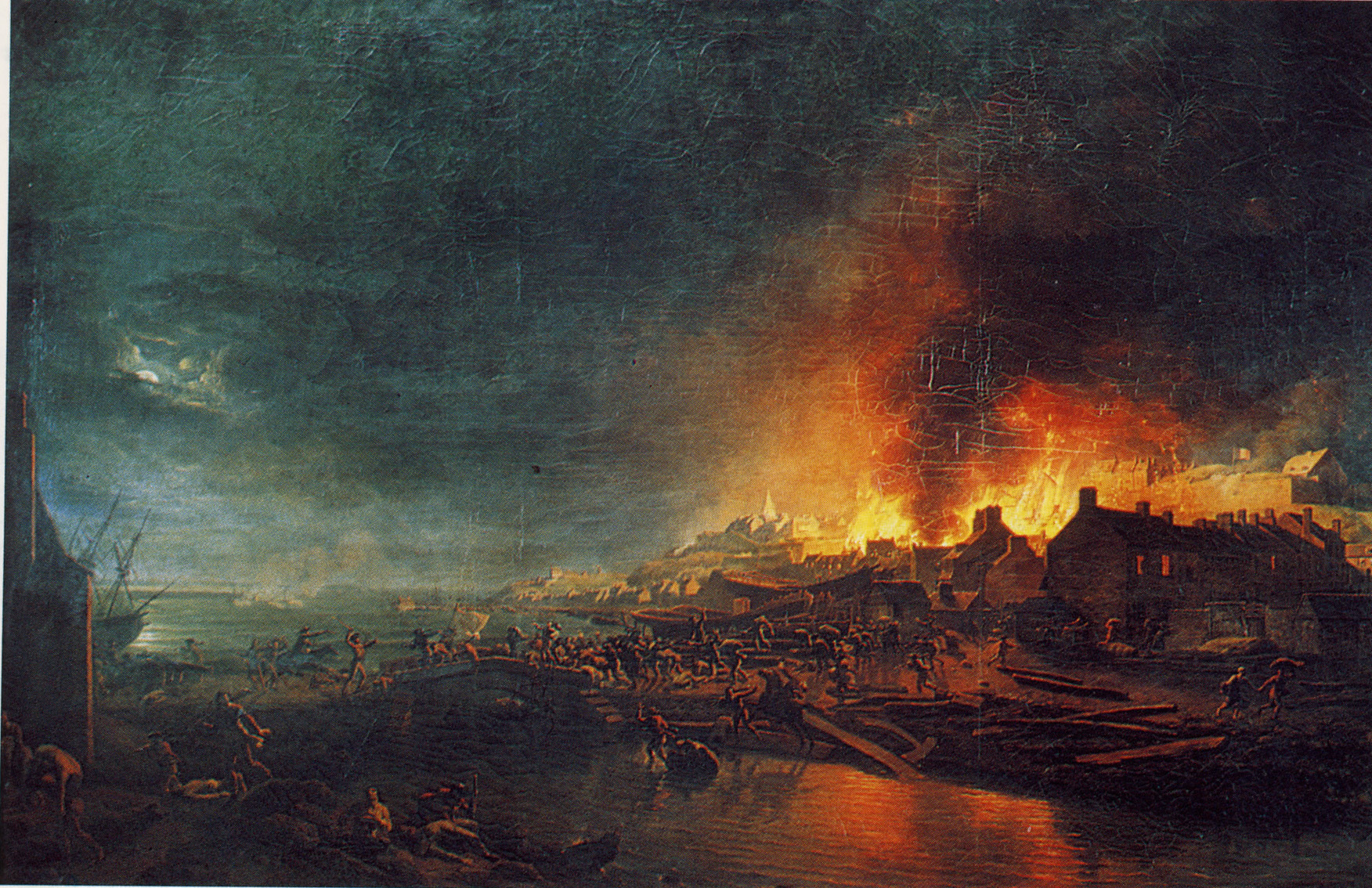
Burning of Granville, Manche. This decisive action is widely considered the first step in the fall of the Vendée Revolt.

==== War in the Vendée ====
The battalion arrived in Nancy on 4 August after being transferred from the Rhine, and joined the Army of the West (Armée du l'Oest) under François Séverin Marceau. On 23 August the battalion arrived in Saumur and immediately sent in pursuit of the Vendeans who had just crossed over the right bank of the Loire. The battalion then found itself involved in the Battle of Granville, Battle of Pontorson, Battle of Entrames, and Battle of Dol, where it distinguished itself during these actions over its volunteer counterparts. On 12 December the regiment was involved in the Battle of Le Mans where the German Legion (Légion Germanique), was unable to hold the town, but after the arrival of the Armagnac and Aunis regiments, the battle became a Republic victory.

Eventually, on 2 January 1794 the battalion took part in the decisive Battle of Machecoul where the Army of Charette Armée de Charette was almost completely destroyed and the Vendéens put into a complete route by the Republicans. The battalion would continue the pursuit and hunt for the remnants of the Charette army until on 22 April 1792, when it amalgamated with the 9th and 12th Manche Volunteer Battalions to form the 12éme Demi-Brigade d'Infanterie.

Eventually in 1796, the 12th Demi-Brigade amalgamated, as part of the second round of amalgamations, with the 1st and 2nd Battalions of the 32nd Infantry (Bassigny), depots of the 1st and 2nd Battalions of the 37th Infantry (Maréccal de Turenne), 1st Battalion of the 82nd Infantry (Saintonge), and 1st Battalion of the Seine Inferieure Volunteers to form the 81st Demi-Brigade de Deuxième Formation. This demi-brigade would eventually, in 1803, reform the old 81st Infantry Regiment, formerly the Régiment de Conti.

== Garrison battalion ==
On formation of the Armagnac regiment, there was a Bataillon de Marmande, which formed the garrison of Armagnac Province. This garrison battalion was composed of militia, and organised into five fusilier companies, and a grenadier company, which was separated in 1778 to join the Régiment des Grenadiers Royaux de la Guyenne.

== Further lineage ==
As part of the second round of amalgamations in 1796, the 6éme Demi-Brigade de Deuxième Formation was formed through the amalgamation of the following (in English titles); 2nd and 3rd Battalions of the 6th Demi-Brigade, 196th Demi-Brigade, part of the 3rd Paris Battalion of Second Formation, 7th and 10th (Battalion of the Museum) Paris Battalions of Second Formation, 4th Battalion of Volunteers of the Sarthe, and 3rd Battalion of Volunteers of the Eure-et-Loir. In 1803, this demi-brigade was transformed into the 6éme Régiment d'Infanterie de Ligne, and took over the lineage of the old Armagnac regiment.

In 1814, after the first Bourbon Restoration, the regiment was transformed into the 78éme Légion de Tarn, and in 1820 transformed into the 57th Infantry Regiment. On that same date, the 6th Infantry reformed from the old 12éme Légion de Bouches-du-Rhône, and the lineage continued.

== Uniforms ==
Regimental uniforms throughout the regiment's history included:

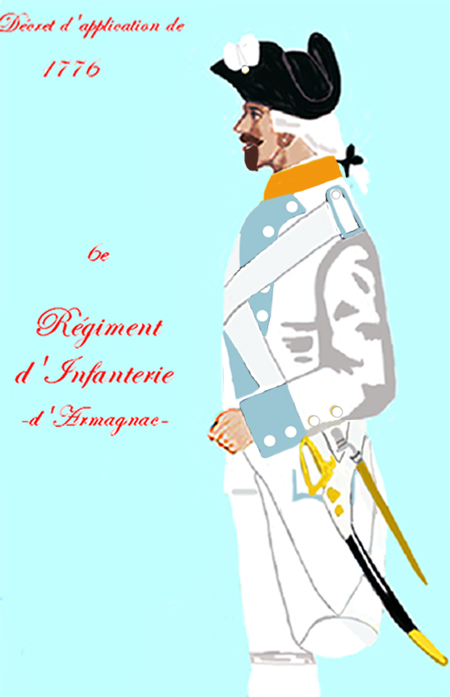
Fusiliers' uniform following the 1776 regulations, issued just after formation of the regiment.

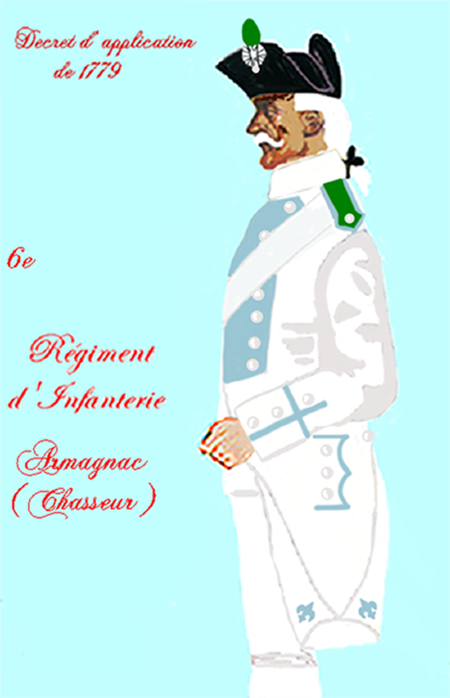
Regimental uniform following the 1779 regulations, which for the regiment weren't implemented until 1783 due to its dislocation in the Americas. The green plume and epaulette indicates this is a chassuer.

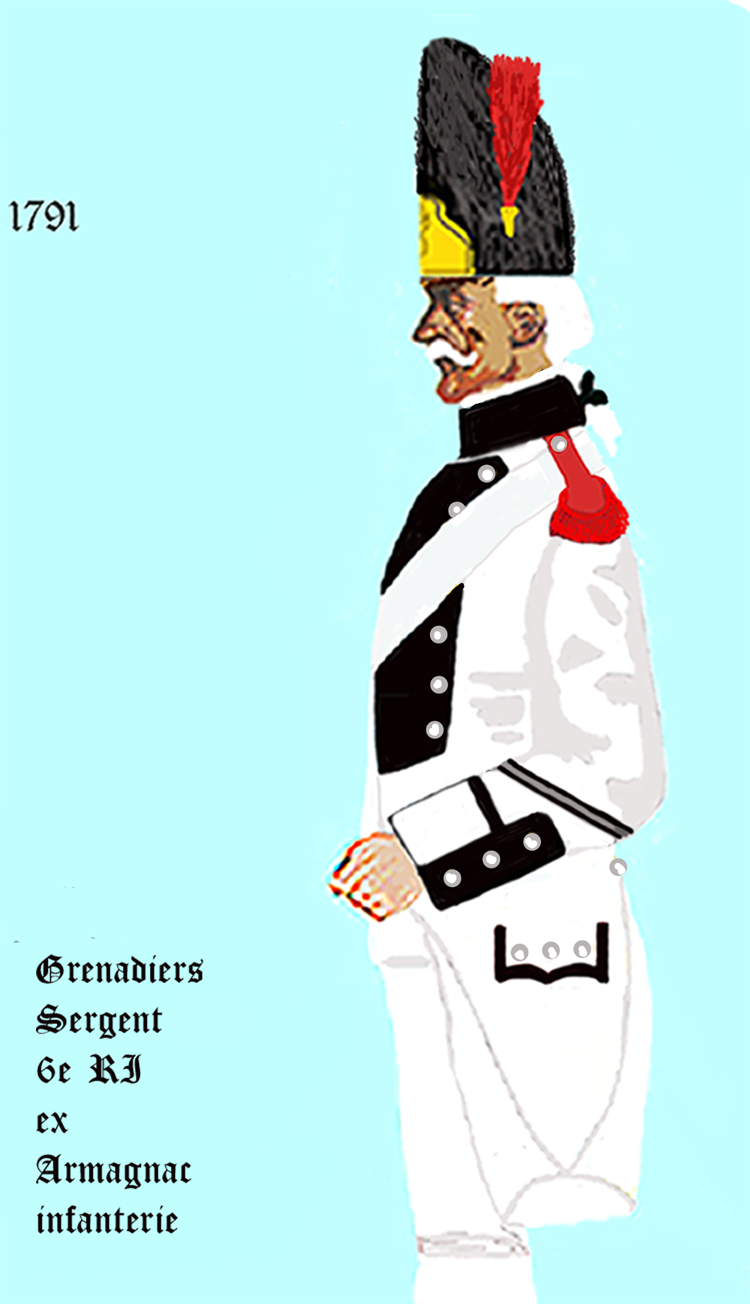
Regimental uniform following the Provisional Regulations of 1 April 1791, the bearskin cap, red plume, and red epaulettes indicate this is a Sergeant of the grenadier company.

== Colours ==
Prior to 1791, regiments of all nationalities of the French Royal Army carried some form of regimental colours or standards, and these varied according to regulation, the taste of a commanding officer, or event the availability of cloth. The French had no national colour during the period. The Bourbon colour was white, and eventually a white flag with gold fleur-de-lis would be adopted as the national colour. French regiments had a Colonel's colours (Drapeau de Colonel) of a white flag with a spear point finial and a white cravat hanging from the staff directly under the finial.

As the Regiment d'Armagnac was from a historic province with strong ties to the monarchy it was able to maintain its own distinctive colonel's colours. Their colours were the normal bourbon white cross, but with golden Fleur-de-lis (golden lilies) throughout the cross.

The other colours for the infantry regiments were ordnance flags (Drapeau d'Ordnnance) for each company. The designs for all of these flags were based on a large white cross centred on the colour, dividing the flag into four quarters, these then bearing a particular design for each regiment.

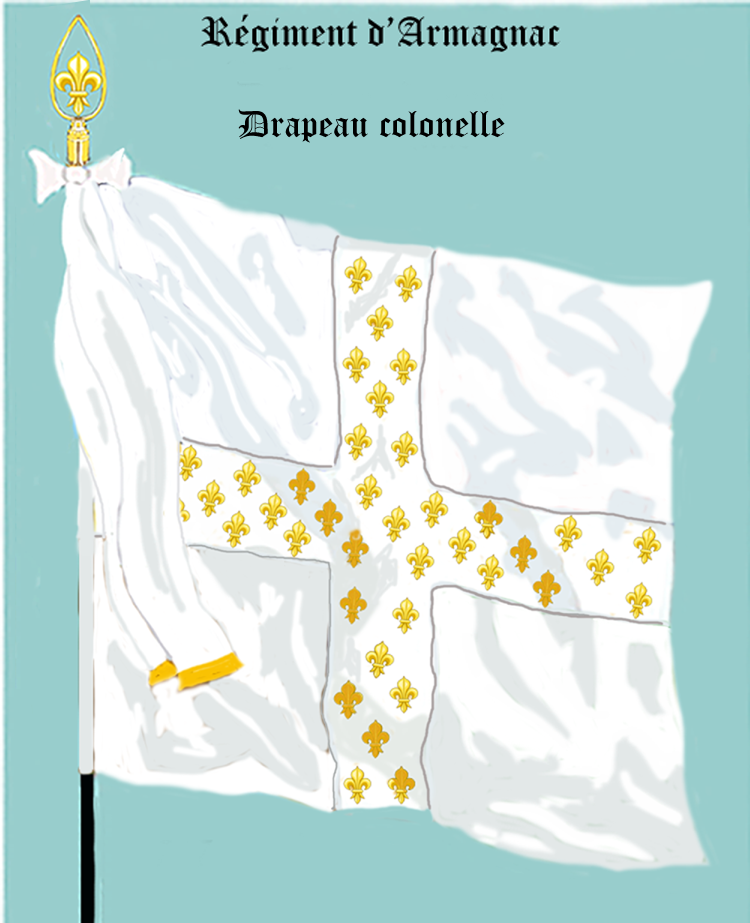
Colonel's colours showing its distinctive golden lilies throughout the light grey outlined cross. These colours were maintained until 1792 when the colonel's colours of all regiments were banished, and made-way for battalion colours.

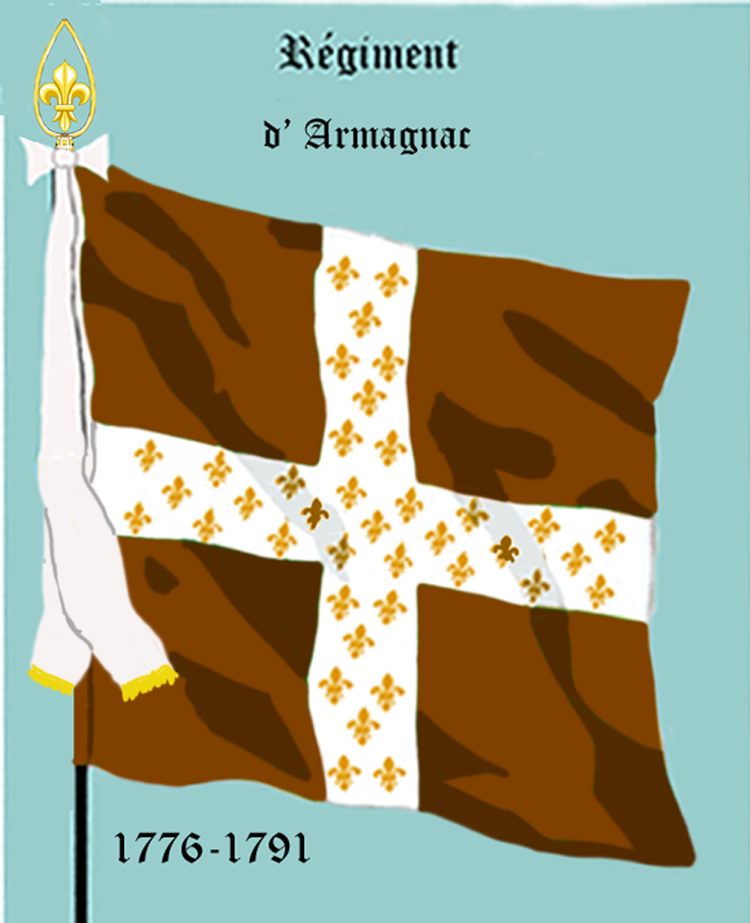
Regimental colours issued between formation in 1776 till 1791, when they were 'republicanised'.

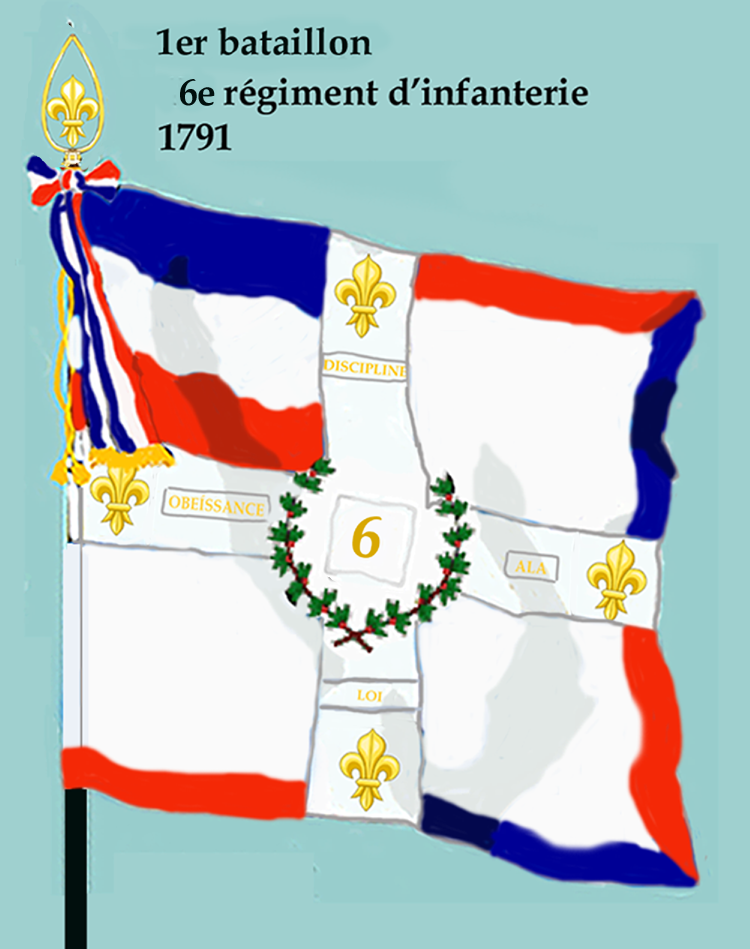
1st battalion's colours, adopted after the republicanisation of the army in 1791, the golden lilies of the monarchy still present.

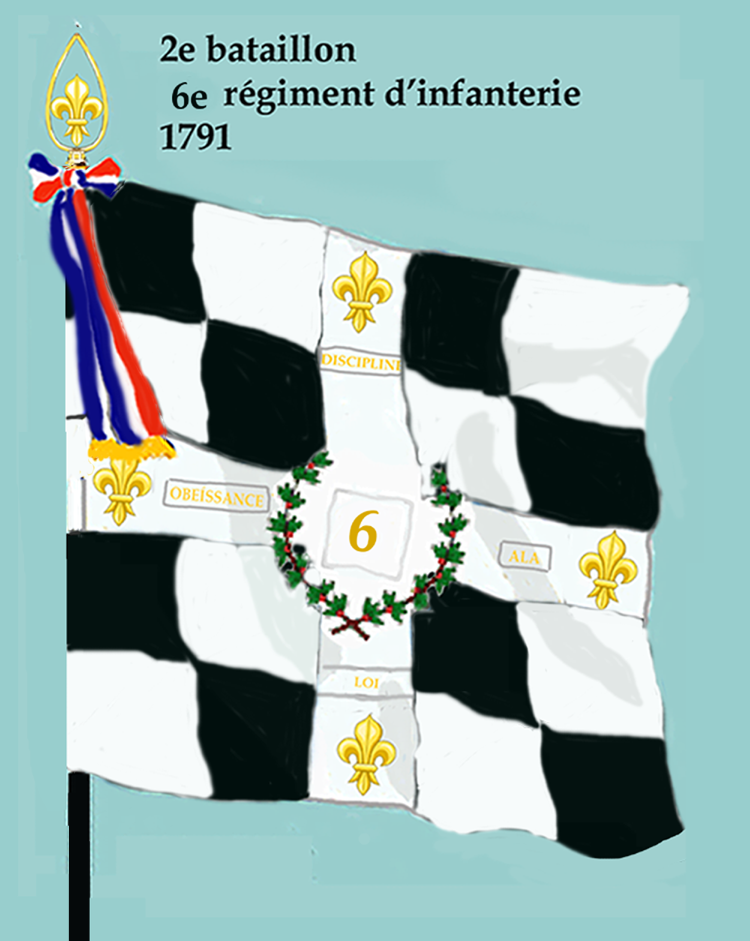
2nd battalion's colours, adopted after the republicanisation of the army in 1791, the golden lilies of the monarchy still present.

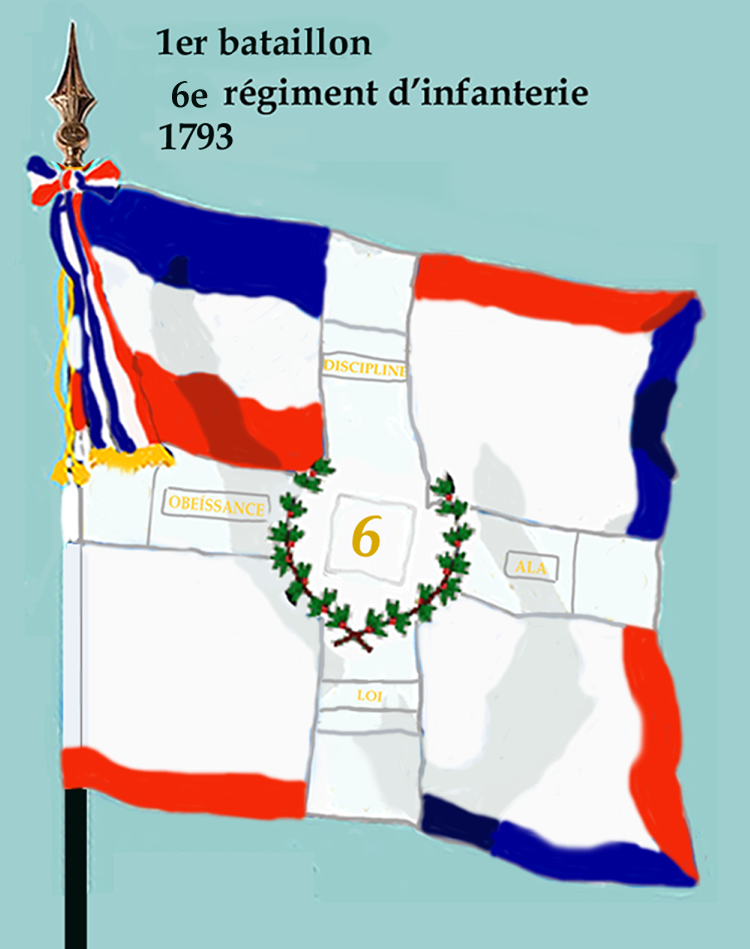
1st battalion's colours, adopted after the declaration of the republic in 1793, the golden lilies of the monarchy removed and top replaced with a spear point.

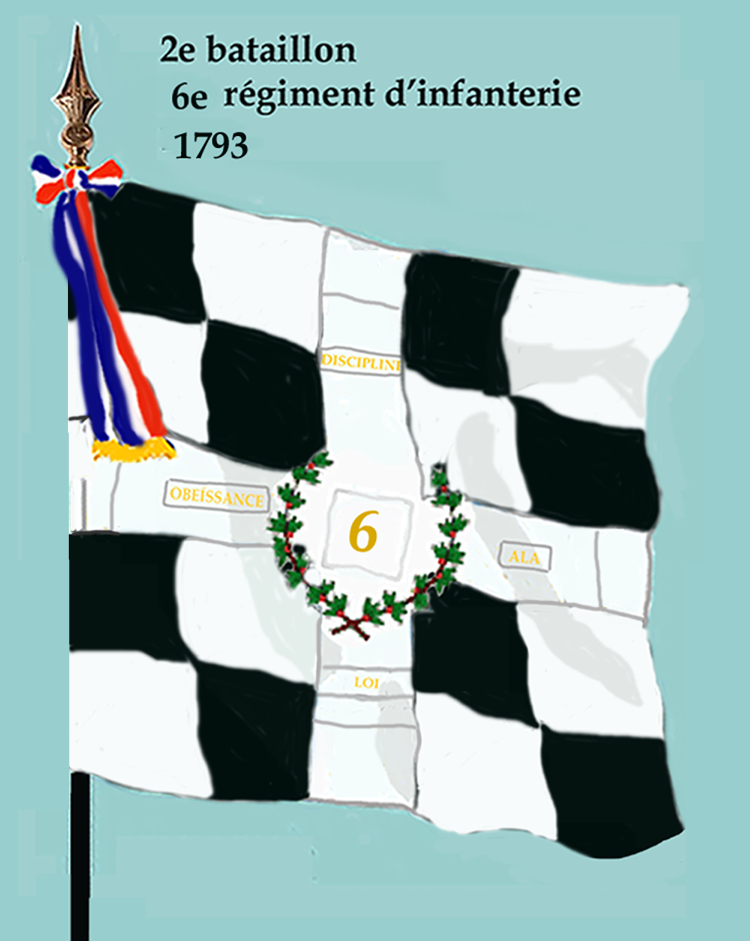
1st battalion's colours, adopted after the declaration of the republic in 1793, the golden lilies of the monarchy removed and top replaced with a spear point.

== Commanding Officers ==
Commanding officers of the regiment included:

- 1776–1779: François Xavier, Comte de Lowendhal
- 1779–1788: Louis Nicole, Marquis de Livarot
- 1788–1791: Jean-Baptiste Antoine Marie Hilarious Pacôme, Chevalier de Grimaldi
- 1791–1791: Jean Baptiste Marie Joseph Florimond de Cappy
- 1791–1792: Jacques Thomas Lhuillier de Rouvenac
- 1792–1794: Pierre Clédat
