= John Bean =

John Bean may refer to:

- John Bean (cricketer) (1913–2005), English cricketer and British Army officer
- John Bean (politician) (1927–2021), long-standing participant in the British far right
- John Bean (explorer) (fl. 1751–1757), Canadian explorer and mariner employed by the Hudson's Bay Company
- John Bean (cinematographer) (1963–2011), Australian cinematographer
- John William Bean (1824–1882), British criminal who attempted to assassinate Queen Victoria

== See also ==
- John Beane (c. 1503–1580), English politician
- Johnny Bean from Happy Bunny Green, a comic strip
- Jonathan Bean (disambiguation)
