= Joseph Robson =

- Born: United Kingdom
- Died: 1763
- Occupations: stonemason, surveyor and author
- Known for: Author of a book critical of his former employer, the Hudson's Bay Company

Joseph Robson was an 18th-century stonemason, surveyor and writer, best known for writing about the decades he spent constructing forts for the Hudson's Bay Company.

Robson's place and date of birth are unknown. It is known he came to Hudson's Bay in 1733, and spent three years building the stone fort at Prince of Wales Fort, and returned in 1744, for another three-year stint, first at York Factory, where he held the position of "Surveyor and Supervisor of the Buildings", and then back at Fort Prince of Wales.

Robson surveyed the lower reaches of the Churchill, Nelson and Hayes rivers.

After Robson returned to the United Kingdom, Robert Pilgrim the factor (ie governor), would describe Robson's conflict with him amounted to a "near-mutiny".

In 1749 Robson testified before a Parliamentary Committee.

In 1752 Robson published his account of his time working in the Hudson's Bay Company's outposts on Hudson's Bay. Historians view his memoirs as particularly valuable. In 1763 he published a second book, on The British Mars, on building fortifications.
