= Diabolic =

Diabolic may refer to:

- Diabolic (band), an American death metal band
- Diabolic (rapper), American rapper
- Diabolic (film), a 2025 horror film

== See also ==
- Diabolical (disambiguation)
- Diabolik, an Italian comic series
