= List of shipwrecks in December 1832 =

The list of shipwrecks in December 1832 includes ships sunk, foundered, grounded, or otherwise lost during December 1832.

== 1 December ==
List of shipwrecks: 1 December 1832
Ship	State	Description
Camilla	United Kingdom	The ship was driven ashore and wrecked in Conception Bay. Her crew were rescued. She was on a voyage from St. John's, Newfoundland to Harbour Grace, Newfoundland, British North America.
Drie Geschwesters	Prussia	The ship was driven ashore and wrecked on Rügen. She was on a voyage from Saint Petersburg, Russia to Danzig or Stettin.
Edward and Amelia	(United Kingdom of Great Britain and Ireland) British North America	The ship was driven ashore at Horton Bluff, Nova Scotia. She was on a voyage from Digby to Windsor, Nova Scotia.
Helena	United Kingdom	The ship sprang a leak and was abandoned in the North Sea off Flamborough Head, Yorkshire.
Margaret	United Kingdom	The ship departed from Hull, Yorkshire for Ostend, West Flanders, Belgium. No further trace, presumed foundered in the North Sea with the loss of all hands.
Mary	United Kingdom	The ship foundered in the North Sea 40 nautical miles (74 km) off Tynemouth, Northumberland. Her crew were rescued by the brig Royal Union (United Kingdom. Mary was on a voyage from Dundee, Forfarshire to London.
Metta Margaretta	Sweden	The ship was spoken with off the coast of England whilst on a voyage from Longsound to London. No further trace, presumed foundered with the loss of all hands.
Osprey	United States	The ship was wrecked in Chebucto Bay. She was on a voyage from Pictou, Nova Scotia, British North America to New York.
Sir E Codrington	United Kingdom	The ship was driven ashore and wrecked at Petit Rivière, Nova Scotia.

== 2 December ==
List of shipwrecks: 2 December 1832
Ship	State	Description
Camilla	(United Kingdom of Great Britain and Ireland) British North America	The ship was driven ashore and wrecked at Portugal Cove, Newfoundland. Her crew were rescued. She was on a voyage from St. John's, Newfoundland to Harbour Grace, Newfoundland.
Henry	United Kingdom	The ship was driven ashore near The Needles, Isle of Wight. She was on a voyage from Southampton, Hampshire to Jersey, Channel Islands.
Iona	United Kingdom	The ship was driven ashore in the Saint Lawrence River. She was on a voyage from Quebec City, Lower Canada, British North America to London.
Jeremiah	United Kingdom	The ship was driven ashore and wrecked in Glenluce Bay. She was on a voyage from Leith, Lothian to Bristol, Gloucestershire.
Mercury	United Kingdom	The ship was lost in Placentia Bay with the loss of two of her crew.
Minerva	Bremen	The ship was driven ashore and wrecked 2 nautical miles (3.7 km) east of Newhaven, Sussex. Her crew were rescued.
Pennsylvania	United States	The ship was wrecked on the Cape Romain Shoals near Charleston, South Carolina. All on board were rescued. She was on a voyage from Havre de Grâce, Seine-Inférieure, France to Philadelphia, Pennsylvania.
Rosalind	United Kingdom	The ship was driven ashore and severely damaged at L'Isle-aux-Coudres, Lower Canada, British North America.
Sir John Beresford	United Kingdom	The ship was driven ashore in the Saint Lawrence River. She was on a voyage from Quebec City, Lower Canada to Liverpool, Lancashire.

== 3 December ==
List of shipwrecks: 3 December 1832
Ship	State	Description
Cessnock	United Kingdom	The brig was driven ashore in Glenarm Bay. She was on a voyage from Liverpool, Lancashire to Newfoundland, British North America. She was refloated on 8 December and taken in to Belfast, County Antrim.
Faith	United Kingdom	The ship sprang a leak and was abandoned in the North Sea. Her crew were rescued by HMS Conway (Royal Navy). Faith was on a voyage from Newcastle upon Tyne, Northumberland to Exeter, Devon.
Henry	United Kingdom	The ship was wrecked on the north coast of Jura, Inner Hebrides. Her crew were rescued. She was on a voyage from South Shields, County Durham to New York, United States.
Hoffnung	Hamburg	The ship was wrecked near "Port Verdre", in the Mediterranean.
Iphigenia	United Kingdom	The ship was driven ashore near Holyhead, Anglesey. her crew were rescued. She was on a voyage from Saint John, New Brunswick to Newry, County Antrim.
Snapdragon	United Kingdom	The ship was wrecked 3 nautical miles (5.6 km) east of Bridport, Dorset.
Sophie	France	The ship was wrecked 3 leagues (9 nautical miles (17 km)) from Saint-Nazaire, Loire-Inférieure. Her crew were rescued. She was on a voyage from St. Jago de Cuba to Saint-Nazaire.
Superb	United Kingdom	The ship was driven ashore and wrecked near Sligo. Her crew were rescued. She was on a voyage from Glasgow, Renfrewshire to Sligo.

== 4 December ==
List of shipwrecks: 4 December 1832
Ship	State	Description
Alexander	Hamburg	The ship was driven ashore on the west coast of Jutland. Her crew were rescued. She was on a voyage from Bordeaux, Gironde, France to Hamburg.
Charles Cate	United Kingdom	The ship was wrecked at Rocken End, Isle of Wight with the loss of three of her crew.

== 5 December ==
List of shipwrecks: 5 December 1832
Ship	State	Description
Betsey	United Kingdom	The ship departed from Liverpool, Lancashire for Rouen, Seine-Inférieure, France. No further trace, presumed foundered with the loss of all hands.
Braganza	United States	The ship was driven ashore at Tavernier, Florida. She was refloated and taken in to Key West, Florida where she was declared a constructive total loss. Braganza was on a voyage from Jamaica to Norfolk, Virginia.
Ceres	United Kingdom	The brig was wrecked on a sandbank off Ostend, West Flanders, Belgium.

== 6 December ==
List of shipwrecks: 6 December 1832
Ship	State	Description
Bell	United Kingdom	The sloop was driven ashore and wrecked at Montrose, Forfarshire with the loss of a crew member. Survivors were rescued by the Montrose Lifeboat.
Hume	United Kingdom	The ship was abandoned off the coast of Newfoundland, British North America. Her crew were rescued by Siren (United Kingdom).

== 7 December ==
List of shipwrecks: 7 December 1832
Ship	State	Description
Esperanza	Portugal	The ship foundered off Cape St. Vincent. She was on a voyage from Faro to Havre de Grâce, Seine-Inférieure, France.
Lowther	United Kingdom	The steamship was lost on the Dudgeon Bank, in the North Sea. Her crew were rescued. She was on a voyage from Great Yarmouth, Norfolk to Selby, Yorkshire.
Myrtle	United Kingdom	The sloop was driven ashore and wrecked between Leven and Methil, Fife.
Sisters	United Kingdom	The sloop was abandoned in the North Sea 40 nautical miles (74 km) north north east of Troup Head, Aberdeenshire. Her crew were rescued by the brig Blagdon (United Kingdom). Sisters was on a voyage from Danzig, Prussia to Aberdeen and Newcastle upon Tyne, Northumberland.

== 8 December ==
List of shipwrecks: 8 December 1832
Ship	State	Description
Vrow Margaretta	Netherlands	The ship was wrecked on Schiermonnikoog, Friesland. Her crew were rescued. She was on a voyage from Riga, Russia to Dunkirk, Nord, France.

== 9 December ==
List of shipwrecks: 9 December 1832
Ship	State	Description
Emerald	United Kingdom	The ship was damaged by ice and was abandoned off "Matan". She was on a voyage from Quebec City, Lower Canada, British North America to London.
James Morgan	United Kingdom	The ship departed from Liverpool, Lancashire for Drogheda, County Louth. No further trace, presumed foundered with the loss of all hands.
Redentore	Netherlands	The ship was wrecked on the Haaks Bank, in the North Sea. Her crew were rescued. She was on a voyage from Smyrna, Ottoman Empire to Amsterdam, North Holland.

== 11 December ==
List of shipwrecks: 11 December 1832
Ship	State	Description
Antonius	United Kingdom	The brig was driven ashore at "Steenort". Her crew were rescued.
Eliza	United Kingdom	The ship departed from Colchester, Essex for Hull, Yorkshire. No further trace, presumed foundered in the North Sea with the loss of all hands.
John and Thomas	United Kingdom	The ship was driven ashore and wrecked on Borkum, Kingdom of Hanover. Her crew were rescued. She was on a voyage from Hull to Emden, Kingdom of Hanover.
Victoria	Danzig	The ship was wrecked near Ystad, Sweden. Her crew were rescued. She was on a voyage from London, United Kingdom to Danzig.

== 13 December ==
List of shipwrecks: 13 December 1832
Ship	State	Description
Betsies	United Kingdom	The ship was driven ashore in the Bay of Glenelg. She was on a voyage from Liverpool, Lancashire to Sunderland, County Durham.
Eliza	Norway	The ship was wrecked near Venice, Kingdom of Lombardy–Venetia. She was on a voyage from Bergen to Venice.
Jack Tar	United Kingdom	The ship was driven ashore and damaged at Alexandria, Egypt. She was later refloated and taken in to Alexandria.
William Booth	United Kingdom	The ship was driven ashore at Galway. Her crew were rescued. She was on a voyage from Quebec City, Lower Canada, British North America to Galway and Liverpool, Lancashire.

== 14 December ==
List of shipwrecks: 14 December 1832
Ship	State	Description
Erindringen	Norway	The ship was wrecked on the Isle of Harris, Outer Hebrides, United Kingdom with the loss of all hands. She was on a voyage from Trondheim to Barcelona, Spain.
Harriet	United Kingdom	The ship foundered in the North Sea off the Dudgeon Bank. Her crew were rescued. She was on a voyage from Beccles, Suffolk to Goole, Yorkshire.
Vrow Gertruda	Netherlands	The ship was wrecked at Malta.

== 15 December ==
List of shipwrecks: 15 December 1832
Ship	State	Description
Anna	Norway	The ship was driven ashore at "Solsvig", near Bergen. She was on a voyage from Bergen to Trieste.
James Cropper	United States	The ship struck the Five Fathom Bank. She refloated but consequently foundered. Her crew were rescued. She was on a voyage from Bristol to Petersburg or Philadelphia, Pennsylvania.
Lucy Davidson	United Kingdom	The barque was wrecked off Tobago. All on board were rescued. She was on a voyage from Tobago to London.

== 16 December ==
List of shipwrecks: 16 December 1832
Ship	State	Description
Albion	United Kingdom	The ship was run down and sunk in the North Sea off Cromer, Norfolk by Kent (United Kingdom. Her crew were rescued by Kent.
Wharfinger	United Kingdom	The ship was wrecked on the Gunfleet Sand, in the North Sea off the coast of Essex. Her crew were rescued by Spy (United Kingdom).

== 17 December ==
List of shipwrecks: 17 December 1832
Ship	State	Description
Coronation	United Kingdom	The ship was driven ashore at Saltfleet, Lincolnshire. Her crew were rescued. She was on a voyage from King's Lynn, Norfolk to Wakefield, Yorkshire.
Corkrump	United Kingdom	The ship foundered in West Bay. She was on a voyage from Teignmouth to Dartmouth, Devon.
Dolphin	United Kingdom	The ship foundered off St David's Head, Pembrokeshire. She was on a voyage from an Irish port to Bristol, Gloucestershire.
Minosse	Austrian Empire	The ship was wrecked near "Marabout", Egypt.
Wellington	United Kingdom	The ship was driven ashore on Islay, Inner Hebrides. She subsequently drifted off and capsized. Wellington was on a voyage from Liverpool, Lancashire to Newcastle upon Tyne, Northumberland.

== 18 December ==
List of shipwrecks: 18 December 1832
Ship	State	Description
Antwerp	Belgium	The ship was abandoned in the North Sea off the Dutch coast. She was on a voyage from Hull, Yorkshire, United Kingdom to Ostend, West Flanders.
Beaver	United Kingdom	The ship was wrecked on rocks off Derbyhaven, Isle of Man. Her crew were rescued. She was on a voyage from Liverpool, Lancashire to Fort William, Inverness-shire.
Cora	United States	The ship was driven ashore at Duxbury, Massachusetts. She was on a voyage from Smyrna, Ottoman Empire to Boston, Massachusetts.
Scott	United Kingdom	The ship was damaged by ice and abandoned at Miramichi, New Brunswick, British North America.
Severn	United Kingdom	The ship was wrecked near "St. Ann's Head". Her crew were rescued. She was on a voyage from Lancaster, Lancashire to Fort William.

== 19 December ==
List of shipwrecks: 19 December 1832
Ship	State	Description
Logan	United States	The ship was struck by lightning and destroyed by fire off Bermuda. Her sixteen crew were rescued by Grand Turk (United Kingdom of Great Britain and Ireland) Turks Islands.

== 20 December ==
List of shipwrecks: 20 December 1832
Ship	State	Description
Eloysa	Hamburg	The ship was wrecked near Tönning, Denmark. She was on a voyage from London, United Kingdom to Hamburg.
Esther	United Kingdom	The ship departed from Harrington, Cumberland for Dublin. No further trace, presumed foundered in the Irish Sea with the loss of all hands.
Ganges	Belgium	The ship was driven ashore at Ostend, West Flanders. She was on a voyage from Matanzas, Cuba to Ostend. Ganges was refloated on 7 January 1833 and taken in to Ostend.
Gordon Castle	United Kingdom	The ship was cut by ice and wrecked in the Restigouche River, British North America.

== 21 December ==
List of shipwrecks: 21 December 1832
Ship	State	Description
Barbara	United Kingdom	The brig was wrecked on the Goodwin Sands, Kent. Her crew were rescued. She was on a voyage from Pictou, Nova Scotia, British North America to Newcastle upon Tyne, Northumberland.
Lark	(United Kingdom of Great Britain and Ireland) Dominica	The schooner was wrecked in Manget Bay.

== 22 December ==
List of shipwrecks: 22 December 1832
Ship	State	Description
Economy	United Kingdom	The ship was wrecked on Coquet Island, Northumberland.
Ganges	United Kingdom	The ship was wrecked at Ostend, West Flanders, Belgium. She was on a voyage from Matanzas, Cuba to Ostend.
Ormrod	United Kingdom	The steamship sank in the River Foyle. She was on a voyage from Downpatrick, County Down to Liverpool, Lancashire.
Tweed	(United Kingdom of Great Britain and Ireland) British North America	The ship was driven ashore in the Fire Island Inlet. She was on a voyage from Pictou, Nova Scotia to New York, United States.

== 23 December ==
List of shipwrecks: 23 December 1832
Ship	State	Description
Barbarian	United Kingdom	The ship was wrecked on the Goodwin Sands, Kent. She was on a voyage from Quebec City, Lower Canada, British North America to Hull, Yorkshire.
Fortuna	Norway	The ship was wrecked on Agerø, Denmark. She was on a voyage from London, United Kingdom to Dram.

== 24 December ==
List of shipwrecks: 24 December 1832
Ship	State	Description
Dart	United Kingdom	The ship was driven ashore and wrecked near Cabrito Point, Spain. She was on a voyage from Gibraltar to Cádiz, Spain.
Gipsy	United Kingdom	The ship was driven ashore and wrecked 6 nautical miles (11 km) east of St. Ives, Cornwall with the loss of all hands.
Trusty	United Kingdom	The ship ran aground of the Gristle Bank, in the North Sea. She was holed by her anchor and was consequently beached. Trusty was on a voyage from Leith, Lothian to London.

== 25 December ==
List of shipwrecks: 25 December 1832
Ship	State	Description
Betsey	United Kingdom	The ship was wrecked on the Barrows Sand, in the North Sea off the coast of Essex. Her crew were rescued.
Carl XI	Sweden	The ship was driven ashore and wrecked at Blackgang Chine, Isle of Wight, United Kingdom with the loss of three of her crew. She was on a voyage from Alicante, Spain to Antwerp, Belgium.
Governor Douglas	United Kingdom	The ship was wrecked at "Rorken End" with the loss of three of her crew.
Trusty	United Kingdom	The ship sank off Harwich, Essex. She was on a voyage from Leith, Lothian to London. Trusty was refloated on 9 January 1833 and taken in to Harwich.

== 26 December ==
List of shipwrecks: 26 December 1832
Ship	State	Description
Hannah	(United Kingdom of Great Britain and Ireland) British North America	The ship was driven ashore at Eastport, New York, United States.
Sophia	Danzig	The ship foundered off Leba. She was on a voyage from Danzig to Hull, Yorkshire, United Kingdom.

== 27 December ==
List of shipwrecks: 27 December 1832
Ship	State	Description
John	(United Kingdom of Great Britain and Ireland) Grenada	The sloop was wrecked in Grand Bacotal Bay.
Nellie	United Kingdom	The ship was driven ashore and wrecked at Balmae, Wigtownshire with the loss of all hands.

== 28 December ==
List of shipwrecks: 28 December 1832
Ship	State	Description
Beaver	United Kingdom	The sloop was driven ashore and wrecked at Derbyhaven, Isle of Man. Her crew were rescued. She was on a voyage from Liverpool, Lancashire to Fort William, Inverness-shire.
Brothers	United Kingdom	The ship was wrecked on the Bondicar Rock, in the North Sea off the coast of Northumberland. Her crew were rescued. She was on a voyage from London to Aberdeen.
John and Peggy	United Kingdom	The ship was driven ashore and wrecked at Fishguard, Pembrokeshire. Her crew were rescued.
Minerva	United Kingdom	The brig was driven ashore at Peel, Isle of Man. She was on a voyage from Whitehaven, Cumberland to Dublin. Minerva was refloated on 7 January and taken in to Peel.
Perseverance	United Kingdom	The ship was lost at Little Catalina, Newfoundland, British North America. Her crew were rescued. She was on a voyage from Liverpool, Lancashire to Harbour Grace, Newfoundland.
Severn	United Kingdom	The schooner was driven ashore and wrecked at St Ann's Head, Isle of Man. Her crew were rescued. She was on a voyage from Lancaster, Lancashire to Fort William.

== 29 December ==
List of shipwrecks: 29 December 1832
Ship	State	Description
Elizabeth	United Kingdom	The ship foundered in the North Sea off Tetney, Lincolnshire. She was on a voyage from Wells-next-the-Sea, Norfolk to Wakefield, Yorkshire.
Eslington	United Kingdom	The collier, a brig, was wrecked on the Gunfleet Sand, in the North Sea off the coast of Essex with the loss of six lives. She was on a voyage from South Shields, County Durham to London.
Gipsey	United Kingdom	The ship was driven ashore and wrecked near St. Ives, Cornwall with the loss of all hands.
Sarah	United Kingdom	The ship was driven ashore near "Metalmain", County Sligo.
Sparrow	United Kingdom	The ship was driven ashore at Howth, County Dublin.

== 30 December ==
List of shipwrecks: 30 December 1832
Ship	State	Description
Shamrock	United Kingdom	The schooner was in collision with Perseverance (United Kingdom) in the Firth of Clyde off Lady Isle and foundered. Her crew were rescued.

== 31 December ==
List of shipwrecks: 31 December 1832
Ship	State	Description
Catherine	United Kingdom	The ship was abandoned off the coast of Cornwall. Her crew were rescued by New Brunswick (United Kingdom). Catherine was on a voyage from Newport, Monmouthshire to Truro, Cornwall.
Ceres	(United Kingdom of Great Britain and Ireland) British North America	The ship was driven ashore and severely damaged at Sligo, United Kingdom.
Duchess of Somerset	United Kingdom	The ship was driven ashore at Padstow, Cornwall.
Elizabeth	United Kingdom	The barque foundered whilst on a voyage from Plymouth, Devon to Milford Haven, Pembrokeshire. Her crew were rescued by Flora (United Kingdom).
Lady	France	The ship sprang a leak and foundered off La Veille, Finistère with the loss of four of her five crwew. She was on a voyage from Bayonne, Basses-Pyrénées to Nantes, Loire-Inférieure.
Sophie	France	The ship was wrecked near Saint-Nazaire, Loire-Inférieure. Her crew were rescued. She was on a voyage from St. Jago de Cuba to Saint-Nazaire.

== Unknown date ==
List of shipwrecks: Unknown date in December 1832
Ship	State	Description
Adventure	(United Kingdom of Great Britain and Ireland) British North America	The ship was wrecked on Mud Island. She was on a voyage from Halifax to Yarmouth, Nova Scotia.
Agnes	United Kingdom	The ship was driven ashore near Padstow, Cornwall. She was on a voyage from Newry, County Antrim to London.
Barbara	United Kingdom	The brig was wrecked off Ramsgate, Kent before 23 December.
Bayard	France	The ship foundered whilst on a voyage from Bordeaux, Gironde to Havre de Grâce, Seine-Inférieure.
Britannia	United Kingdom	The ship was driven ashore at Mazzara del Vallo before 4 December
Carolina	Portugal	Liberal Wars: The ship was sunk by shore based artillery at the mouth of the Douro in early December.
Caroline	Hamburg	The ship was wrecked at Santa Cruz, Rio de Janeiro, Brazil between 18 and 23 December.
Comet		The brig was lost east of Bowen, New South Wales (now Queensland).
Corkrump	United Kingdom	The ship foundered off West Bay, Dorset before 18 December. She was on a voyage from Teignmouth, Devon to Dartmouth, Devon.
Elizabeth		The brig was discovered on a Queensland reef in March 1832.
Emerald	United Kingdom	The ship was abandoned off "Malan" in early December. She was on a voyage from Rivière-du-Loup, Lower Canada, British North America to Liverpool, Lancashire.
Express	United Kingdom	The ship was driven ashore in the River Thames at Greenwich, Kent.
Fame	United Kingdom	The sloop was destroyed by fire at Ramelton, County Donegal. Her crew were rescued. She was on a voyage from Ramelton to Glasgow, Renfrewshire.
James	United Kingdom	The ship was severely damaged by ice off Farther Point, Lower Canada, British North America. Her crew were rescued by Balmarina (United Kingdom). She was on a voyage from Saint John, New Brunswick, British North America to London.
James and Elizabeth	United Kingdom	The sloop departed from the Tyne in early December for Perth. No further trace, presumed foundered in the North Sea with the loss of all hands.
King George Packet	United Kingdom	The ship was abandoned in the North Sea off Robin Hoods Bay, Yorkshire in early December.
Lark	United Kingdom	The ship was wrecked near Southerness, Dumfriesshire with the loss of all hands.
Lord St. Helens	United Kingdom	The ship was wrecked in Miramichi Bay.
Mangalore	United Kingdom	The ship was severely damaged by fire at Aux Cayes, Haiti before 5 December.
Mountaineer	United States	The ship was wrecked near Cap-Chat, Lower Canada, British North America before 27 December.
Resolution	United Kingdom	The ship foundered in the North Sea. Three of her six crew took to a boat and were rescued.
Royal Tar	United Kingdom	The steamship was driven ashore near Arklow, County Wicklow. All on board were rescued. She was on a voyage from London to Wicklow. Royal Tar was refloated on 5 January 1833.
Scott	United Kingdom	The ship was abandoned in ice in Miramichi Bay.
Sophia	United Kingdom	The ship foundered off Libava, Courland Governorate. She was on a voyage from Danzig, Prussia to Hull, Yorkshire.
Truite	France	The ship was wrecked in the Gulf of Rosas in early December. She was on a voyage from "Adra" to Marseille, Bouches-du-Rhône.
Veare	United Kingdom	The brig struck the Owers Bank, in the English Channel off Selsey Bill, Sussex. Her crew were rescued.
Vera Cruzaña	Mexico	The ship was wrecked on Anegada de Fuerro. She was on a voyage from Veracruz to Tampico.
Victoria	United States	The ship was driven ashore and wrecked on Terschelling, Friesland, Netherlands in late December. Her crew were rescued. She was on a voyage from Virginia to Amsterdam, North Holland, Netherlands.
Zwe Gebruder	Russia	The ship was driven ashore at Lisbon, Portugal. She was declared a total loss on 12 December. Zwe Gebruder was on a voyage from Riga to Lisbon.
