= Hudson Bay expedition =

French raid on trading posts of the Hudson's Bay Company

- Part of the American Revolutionary War
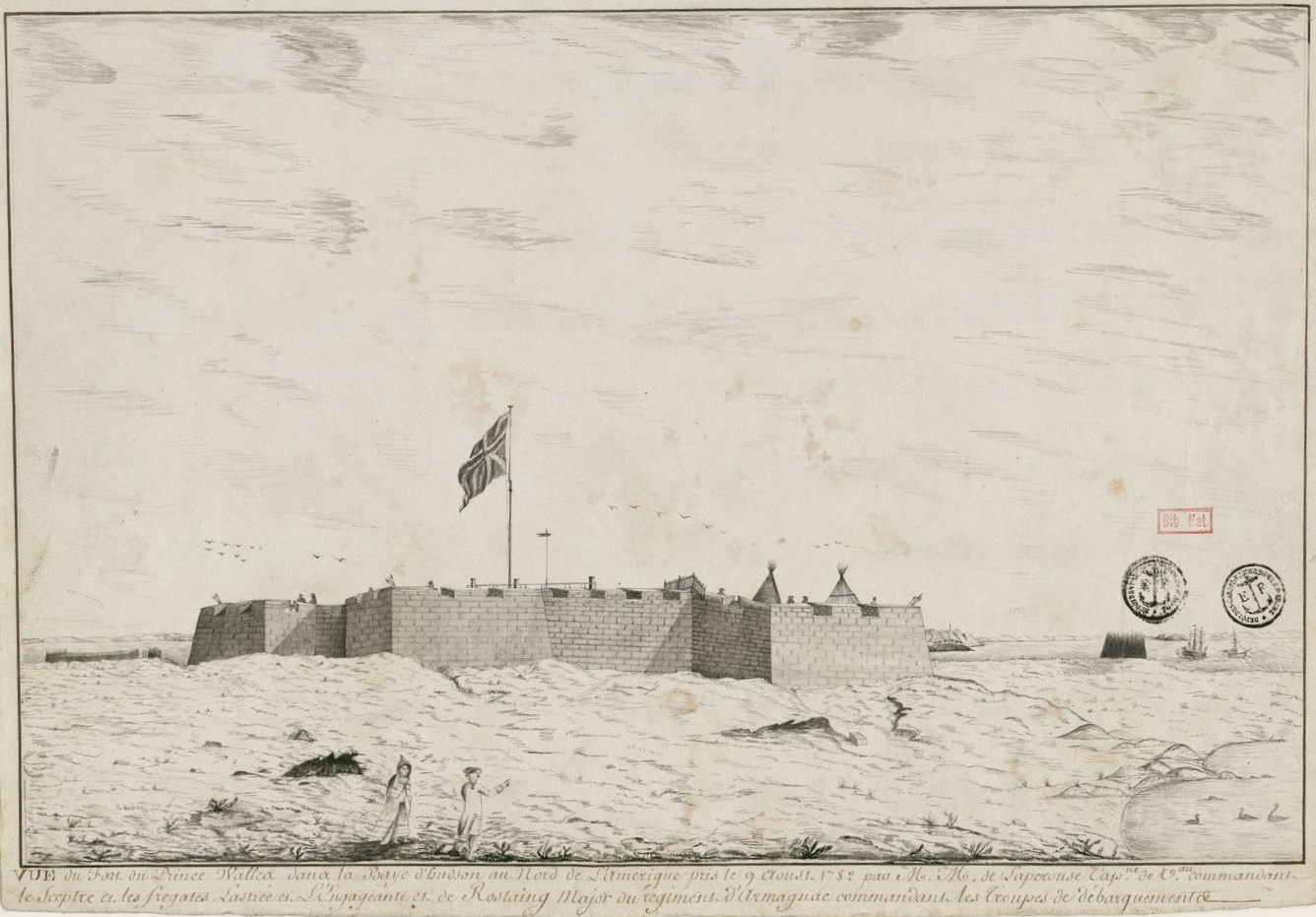
- A French illustration of Prince of Wales Fort (1782)
| Date | August 8, 1782 |
| Location | Prince of Wales Fort and York Factory, Rupert's Land 58°47′49.77″N 94°12′48.34″W |
| Result | French victory |

Belligerents
| France | Hudson's Bay Company |

Commanders and leaders
| Comte de Lapérouse | Samuel Hearne (surrendered) |

Strength
| 1 ship of the line 2 frigates | 2 trading posts 3 merchantmen |

Casualties and losses
| 15 drowned ~85 died of illness | ~100 captured 2 trading posts captured |

The Hudson Bay expedition was a series of military raids on the fur trading outposts and fortifications of the British Hudson's Bay Company (HBC) on the shores of Hudson Bay by a French Navy squadron under the command of the Comte de Lapérouse. Setting sail from Cap-Français, Saint-Domingue in 1782, the expedition was part of a series of globe-spanning naval conflicts between France and Great Britain during the American Revolutionary War.

Operating under secret orders from Charles Eugène Gabriel de La Croix, the French Secretary of State of the Navy, Lapérouse and his squadron set sail from Cap-Français in May 1782, and arrived in the Hudson Bay in early August. Both Prince of Wales Fort and York Factory, two trading posts of the Hudson's Bay Company, surrendered without a fight to the French, though an HBC merchantman that evaded the French fleet spirited away some of the furs stored at York Factory.

Some of captured British prisoners were put on a company sloop and allowed to sail back to England, while others were pressed into service aboard the French squadron. Those serving on Lapérouse's squadron, which had sailed with minimal winter provisioning to maintain secrecy, suffered numerous hardships including scurvy and other diseases. The finances of the Hudson's Bay Company suffered due to the raid, which also indirectly contributed to the deaths of up to half of the Chipewyan fur traders who conducted business with the HBC.

== Background ==
In late 1780, French Navy captain Jean-François de Galaup, comte de Lapérouse proposed to senior Navy administrator Charles Pierre Claret de Fleurieu the idea of an expedition against the fur trading outposts of the British Hudson's Bay Company (HBC) while on a visit to France. Secretary of State of the Navy Charles Eugène Gabriel de La Croix and Louis XVI approved Lapérouse's plan, and La Croix issued Lapérouse secret orders that could override those of any French Navy officer he served under in the event an opportunity presented itself for such an expedition. The idea was to organize a small fleet in secret and make as rapid as possible a journey north to Hudson Bay from either Newport, Rhode Island or Boston, Massachusetts, the most northerly ports of North America open to French ships.

Lapérouse's duties during the 1781 campaign season did not provide him with any chances to exercise his secret orders, but the aftermath of the disastrous French defeat in the April 1782 Battle of the Saintes did present an opportunity. The French and Spanish militaries had been planning an invasion of the British colony of Jamaica, but the French losses incurred during the battle, including the capture of Admiral François Joseph Paul de Grasse and his flagship Ville de Paris led them to call off the invasion. Lapérouse, on his arrival at Cap-Français, Saint-Domingue after the battle, raised the idea with de Grasse's successor, Louis-Philippe de Rigaud, Marquis de Vaudreuil. Vaudreuil approved of the plan, and provided Lapérouse with three ships, including the ship of the line Sceptre and frigates Astrée and Engageante. Astrée was under the command of Paul Antoine Fleuriot de Langle, and Engageante under André-Charles de La Jaille.

Preparations for the expedition were carried out secretly and in some haste, since the French were aware of the short seasons in the far north. The ships' crews and most of their officers were not informed of the fleet's destination, and Lapérouse, seeking to avoid all suspicion, even avoided carrying cold-weather clothing. Vaudreuil recorded the fleet's destination in his records as France, with possible stops in Newport or Boston, and de Langle and de la Jaille were given sealed orders to be opened only upon reaching the latitude of Nova Scotia. The fleet took on 250 soldiers from the Armagnac Regiment and Auxerrois Regiment and 40 artillerymen from the Metz Regiment along with four field guns and two mortars. These troops were informed they were being sent to supplement the French Royal Army presence at Newport. After two weeks of preparation, the fleet set sail from Cap-Français on May 31, 1782.

== Expedition ==
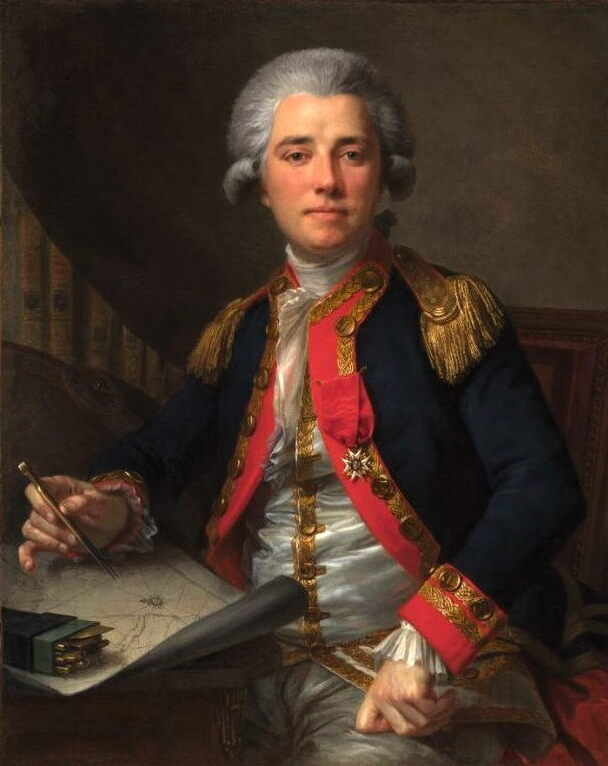
1778 portrait of Lapérouse by Geneviève Brossard de Beaulieu

The fleet eventually reached Resolution Island at the entrance to the Hudson Strait without incident on July 17, and proceeded through the strait and into Hudson Bay. While sailing in the bay, the fleet encountered the HBC merchant ship Sea Horse, which was making sail for Prince of Wales Fort. Lapérouse sent one of the fleet's frigates to chase her. Sea Horse's captain, William Cristopher, suspecting from its behavior that the pursuing frigate lacked good charts for the bay, escaped by a ruse. He gave orders to have the ship's sails furled as if it were preparing to anchor; this prompted the frigate's captain, believing shallow waters to lie ahead, to order his ship's anchor to be dropped. Once he had done so, Cristopher ordered Sea Horse's sails to be raised and sped off before the French frigate could raise anchor.

=== Prince of Wales Fort ===
On August 8 Lapérouse arrived at Prince of Wales Fort, an impressive but crumbling stone fortress that was occupied by 39 British fur traders. Its governor, Samuel Hearne, surrendered the fort without firing a shot when the size of the French force became evident the next day, doing so despite requests from some of his men to "allow them to mow down the French troops with the heavy guns loaded with grapeshot." After resupplying his ships and confiscating the fort's guns, the French proceeded to loot the premises. According to Hearne, the French looted more than 7,500 beaver skins, 4,000 marten pelts, and 17,000 goose quills. They also spent two days trying to raze the fort, but were only able to destroy the gun mounts and damage the upper ramparts. Some of the British prisoners were put aboard the captured HBC sloop Severn, which had been anchored by the fort; others were taken aboard the French squadron, and some were pressed into service in the ship's crews.

=== York Factory ===
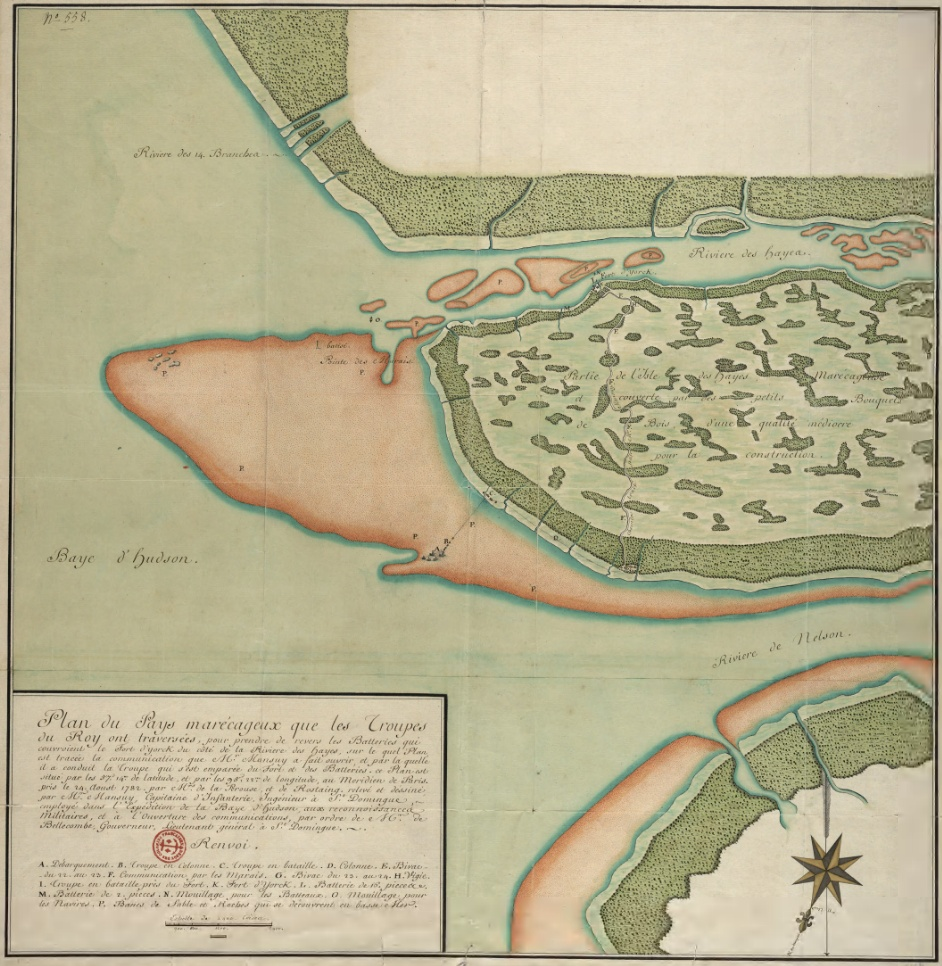
A French military map depicting the expedition's movements on the Hudson Bay

Lapérouse then collected most of the HBC's small boats and on 11 August sailed for York Factory, a trading outpost on a peninsula between the Hayes and Nelson River. According to Lapérouse's report, he arrived in the area, about 5 leagues (15 miles; 24 km) from York, on August 20. The fort's defenses faced the Hayes River, where the HBC ship King George was anchored, and the fast-flowing Hayes River would have made an approach there impractical in the face of such potential opposition.

Lapérouse sailed into the mouth of the Nelson River and moved the troops to the smaller HBC ships on August 21 to prepare an amphibious landing, with the plan of approaching the fort from the rear, a distance of about 16 miles (26 km). He then proceeded with his engineer to take soundings in the Nelson River and discovered that due to its shallowness, even the smaller boats would have difficulty approaching firm land. His small boat then became mired in mud by the receding tide, and was not freed until 3:00 am the next morning. Captain Langle proposed to Major Rostaing, the commander of the French troops in the expedition, that they cross the muddy shallows on foot. This was agreed, and the troops then set out across the shallows. Unknown to them, conditions improved only marginally once land was reached, and they spent the next two days wading through bogs and muck to reach the fort. Meanwhile, Lapérouse returned to the fleet because bad weather was threatening its safety. Both frigates lost their anchors when sharp rocks underwater cut through their cables in the turbulent conditions.

York Factory was occupied by 60 British fur traders and 12 Native Americans. When the French warships were spotted, governor of York Factory Humphrey Marten loaded trade goods onto the King George so they would not fall into French hands. When the French arrived on August 24, Marten surrendered the fort. Although Lapérouse sent a frigate after the King George when she sailed off during the night after the fleet's arrival, her captain, Jonathan Fowler, successfully eluded the pursuit due to his superior knowledge of the shallow waters of the bay. Rostaing took the British inhabitants of the trading post prisoner, destroyed what goods he could not plunder, and burned York Factory to the ground. He was, however, careful to preserve a cache of supplies for use by Native Americans who came to the fort to trade. These acts of kindness, along the treatment of his British captives earned Lapérouse praise from Hearne, Louis XVI, and the British government.

Lapérouse did not learn of the capitulation until August 26, and continuing bad weather and difficulties with the frigates meant that he did not effect a junction with Rostaing until August 31. The terms of capitulation included the surrender of Fort Severn, another trading outpost of the Hudson's Bay Company. He chose not to go to Fort Severn on account of the lateness of the season and the poor condition of his ships and men, who were suffering from scurvy and other diseases. During the process of loading goods and supplies onto the fleet, five small boats overturned and 15 men drowned.

== Aftermath ==
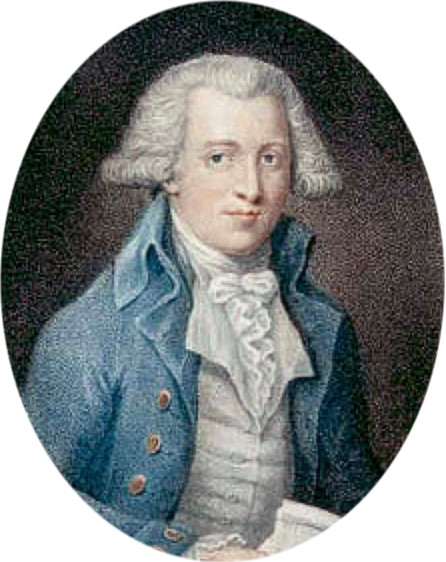
An illustration of governor of Prince of Wales Fort Samuel Hearne, who was captured during the expedition

Lapérouse then began the journey back to the Atlantic, towing the Severn as far as Cape Resolution. There she was cut loose to make her way back to England, while Lapérouse sailed for Cádiz, Spain, with Sceptre and Engageante; Astrée made sail for Brest to deliver news of the expedition's success to Paris. The expedition took a tremendous toll on his ships' crews. By the time the ships returned to Europe, Sceptre had only 60 men (out of an original complement, including non-marine infantry, of almost 500) fit to work; roughly 70 men had died of scurvy. Engageante had suffered 15 deaths from scurvy, and almost everyone was sick with one malady or another. Both ships had also suffered damage due to cold weather and battering by ice floes. Fleuriot de Langle received a brevet promotion to capitaine de vaisseau upon his arrival in Brest in late October.

According to the company, the goods taken at Prince of Wales Fort alone were worth more than £14,000, and Lapérouse's raid damaged the company finances to such an extent that it paid no dividends until 1786. When peace finally came with the 1783 Treaty of Paris, the French agreed to compensate the company for its losses. The raid also resulted in permanent damage to the company's trading relationships. Chipewyan fur traders who traded with the Hudson's Bay Company suffered severely due to both the company's inability to provision them and an ongoing smallpox epidemic that was decimating Native American populations throughout North America; by some estimates the Chipewyan lost half their population. The company's inability to trade with them for two seasons drove many surviving Chipewyan to develop trading relationships with European settlers in Montreal, Quebec.

Neither Hearne nor Marten was sanctioned by the company for surrendering; both returned to their posts the following year. When the French captured Prince of Wales Fort, they found Samuel Hearne's journal, which Lapérouse claimed as a prize of war. The journal contained Hearne's accounts of his explorations of the northern reaches of North America, and Hearne pleaded with Lapérouse for its return. The request was granted on condition that the journal be published. Whether Hearne had intended to publish it anyway is unclear, but by 1792, the year of Hearne's death, he had prepared a manuscript and submitted it for publication. It was published in 1795 as A Journey from Prince of Wales's Fort in Hudson's Bay to the Northern Ocean. Lapérouse was rewarded by Louis XVI with a rise in pay of 800 livres; the exploit also drew popular acclaim in Europe and North America. His next major assignment was to lead a voyage of exploration into the Pacific Ocean in 1785. The fleet conducting the voyage, in which Fleuriot de Langle served as second in command, was last seen in the vicinity of Australia in spring 1788; although remnants of the expedition have been found, his fate remains unknown.

== See also ==
- France in the American Revolutionary War
- List of Anglo-French conflicts on Hudson Bay
