= Robert Pilgrim =

Employee in Hudson's Bay Company

- Born: United Kingdom
- Died: December 1, 1750; London
- Occupations: stonemason, surveyor and author
- Known for: Author of a book critical of his former employer, the Hudson's Bay Company

Robert Pilgrim was an employee of the Hudson's Bay Company, from 1730 to 1750. Pilgrim originally worked as a steward on Hudson's Bay Company ships. In 1735 he given command of a small local Hudson's Bay Company vessel.

In 1740 Pilgrim was given a position on Fort Prince of Wales's Governing Council. He became the Factor, or Governor, in 1745.

According to the Dictionary of Canadian Biography Pilgrim's administration was marked by incompetence, a lack of initiative, and conflicts with his subordinates. Joseph Robson was one of the subordinates with whom he was in conflict. Robson testified before a Parliamentary committee, in 1748.

Pilgrim returned to England, in 1750, with his wife, Ruehegan Thu a higon, a First Nations woman, and their son. He died shortly after his return. His will requested the Hudson's Bay Company allow his wife to return to live with her family, in Churchill, Manitoba. The Company did return her, but instructed Captains to not bring any further Native women to the United Kingdom.
