= Moses Norton =

Canadian politician

Moses Norton (c. 1735 – 29 December 1773) was a Hudson's Bay Company administrator who was chief factor of Fort Prince of Wales from 1762 until his death in 1773. A controversial figure throughout his life, he notably commissioned explorer Samuel Hearne's three expeditions in 1769–1772, which led to the first European discovery of the Coppermine River and the northern coast of Canada.

== Early life ==
Moses Norton was born at Prince of Wales Fort around 1735, the son of Richard Norton and Sunannah Dupeer.

== Career ==
After being indentured to HBC ship captain George Spurrell in 1744, he first served aboard an HBC sloop for several years before becoming an assistant to Ferdinand Jacobs, the chief factor of Fort Prince of Wales, in present-day Churchill, Manitoba. He later served as a mate on the company's vessel Churchill.

In 1762, Norton was appointed to the position of chief factor of Fort Prince of Wales. In 1769, he commissioned English explorer Samuel Hearne to embark on a lengthy expedition to discover the Coppermine River, after being informed of the river's existence by the Chipewyan Indians. Over the course of Hearne's protracted journey, during which he had to restart twice, a large portion of country was discovered and mapped for the first time by Europeans, but the river itself was of questionable importance. The failure of Hearne's first two attempts can largely be attributed to Norton's poor planning and unwise choices for Native guides.

== Death ==
Norton died on 29 December 1773 from a bowel disorder, aged 37 or 38. He was survived by one known daughter, Mary, who herself died in 1782.
