= Jonathan Bean =

Jonathan Bean may refer to:

- Jonathan Bean (cricketer) (born 1964), English cricketer
- Jonathan Bean (illustrator) (born 1979), American author and illustrator of children's books

== See also ==
- John Bean (disambiguation)
