= Princess of Wales (1796 sloop) =

History

Great Britain
- Name: Princess of Wales
- Launched: 1796, Barnstaple
- Fate: Wrecked March 1821

General characteristics
- Tons burthen: 75, or 79, or 80 (bm)
- Complement: 15

Princess of Wales was launched at Broadstairs in 1796 as a Margate hoy. She was rebuilt in 1815. She became a sloop, but was referred to as a cutter. She left on her first seal hunting voyage in 1820 and was wrecked in March 1821 at the Crozet Islands.

== Last voyage ==
Although she was launched in 1796, Princess of Wales did not appear in the Register of Shipping (RS), or Lloyd's Register (LR) until 1818.

| Year | Master | Owner | Trade | Source |
|---|---|---|---|---|
| 1818 | J.Fox | Fox & co. | London–Ostend | LR; rebuilt in the Thames in 1815 |
| 1820 | J.Fox; Matthews | Fox & Co. Barkworth | London–Ostend; London–South Seas | LR; rebuilt in the Thames in 1815 |
| 1821 | Mathews | Barkworth | London–South Seas | LR; rebuilt in the Thames in 1815 |

Princess of Wales, Veale, master, sailed from Limehouse on 5 May 1820. She stopped near Gravesend where Barkworth came on board and read the articles of agreement. She was to sail to the Southern Seal Fishery. At the beginning of September she was at Walwich Bay, replenishing her water. By 1 November she reached the Prince Edward Islands. After sealing with limited success for some weeks she sailed to the Crozet Islands, which she reached on 24 December.

The sealing hunting at their first stopping point proved relatively unproductive so on 5 February Veale left his mate and seven men on a different island, and sailed Princess of Wales to a third island. Every week or so she returned to the sealing party to replenish their supplies, the last visit occurring on 10 March. A storm on 17 March caused Princess of Wales to wreck on some rocks; Veale and the other six men aboard were able to reach shore on the 18th. On 13 December the sealing party succeeded in reaching the island where Veale and his men were, and joining them. On 22 January 1823 the American schooner Philo fortuitously arrived and that day and the next took off all the survivors. On 3 February Philo arrived at Amsterdam Island and St Paul Island. The crew of Princess of Wales had agreed to assist Philo's crew with the sealing. At the islands they gathered 5000 seal skins and 300 quintals of fish. Two of Princess of Wales's crew drowned at Amsterdam Island. A dispute between her mate and the captain of Philo resulted in Philo sailing to Île de France with Veale, his brother, and another of Princess of Wales's crew. The 10 remaining crew men stayed on St Paul Island, hoping to be able to join another vessel that might come along on her way to Australia.

On 3 June the sloop Success, of 28 tons (bm), Anderson, master, arrived. She was a tender to the whaler King George and hoping to rendezvous with her at St Paul Island. King George not having arrived, Success sailed on to Van Diemen's Land, where she arrived 10 days before King George. Because Success was small and had limited supplies she could only take three men. One of them, Goodridge, was the author of the book about Princess of Wales's voyage and fate. (Note: Goodridge in 1839 sent out a number of copies of his book. One copy reached a Thomas Duell, who wrote back that he had been master on King George on one of her whaling voyages (1820–1821), and had been an owner of King George and Success.) They arrived safely at Hobart Town on 11 July 1823.

Lloyd's List (LL): LL reported on 18 January 1822 that the Princess of Wales, Veale, master, had left London in May 1820 for the Southern Seal Fishery and had not since been heard of since. Then on 12 August 1823 LL published a letter from Port Louis, Mauritius. The American vessel Philo had arrived there four days earlier with Veale, master of Princess of Wales. He reported that she had wrecked on Croizet Island in March 1820 and that he had remained on the island for 22 months without any means of escape.
