= Nathaniel Bishop =

Hudson's Bay Company employee

Nathaniel Bishop (? – 30 June 1723) was a Hudson's Bay Company employee who became master of Fort Prince of Wales.
