= Diabolic (film) =

2025 Australian horror film

- Film poster
- Directed by: Daniel J. Phillips
- Screenplay by: Mike Harding; Daniel J. Phillips
- Story by: Ticia Madsen; Mike Harding; Daniel J. Phillips
- Produced by: Daniel J. Phillips; Silvio Salom; Mark Patterson; Grant Hardie; Vasili Papanicolou
- Starring: Elizabeth Cullen; John Harlan Kim; Mia Challis
- Cinematography: Michael Tessari
- Edited by: Sean Lahiff
- Music by: Will Spartalis
- Production companies: Empire Road Pictures; Sunjive Studios
- Distributed by: Monster Pictures
- Release date: November 20, 2025 (Australia)
- Running time: 95 minutes
- Country: Australia
- Language: English

Diabolic is a 2025 Australian supernatural horror film directed by Daniel J. Phillips, who co-wrote the screenplay with Mike Harding. The film stars Elizabeth Cullen as a young woman who, a decade after a baptism ritual went wrong in the fundamentalist sect she was raised in, returns to her former community and is targeted by a vengeful spirit. It is Phillips's second feature, after Awoken (2020).

Backed by the South Australian Film Corporation and Sunjive Studios, Diabolic screened at the Marché du Film and won the award for Best Australian Feature Film at Monster Fest 2025. It was released in Australian cinemas by Monster Pictures on 20 November 2025, followed by a United States release in February 2026.

== Plot ==
In 2015, 17-year-old Elise takes part in a "Baptism for the Dead" ritual conducted by the Fundamentalist Latter Day Saints (FLDS). When the name "Larue" is invoked, a malevolent force disrupts the ceremony, and Elise is excommunicated. A decade later, she suffers blackouts and escalating self-harm, and on her psychiatrist's advice returns to the abandoned FLDS settlement of Haventon, Utah, with her partner Adam and her friend Gwen, using exposure therapy as an alternative to hospitalization. The FLDS elder Alma and her son Hyrum conduct a healing rite using a hallucinogenic Datura brew, during which Elise confronts Larue, a 19th-century witch erased from Mormon history. Alma appears to expel the spirit, but as Elise's suppressed memories resurface, Larue takes full possession of her. Now controlled by the witch, Elise turns on those around her, culminating in a violent attack at a Mormon temple.

== Cast ==
- Elizabeth Cullen as Elise
- John Harlan Kim as Adam
- Mia Challis as Gwen
- Robin Goldsworthy as Hyrum
- Genevieve Mooy as Alma
- Luca Sardelis as Clara
- Seraphine Harley as Larue

== Production ==
Diabolic is the second feature directed by Daniel J. Phillips, after Awoken (2020). The screenplay was written by Phillips and Mike Harding, from a story credited to Ticia Madsen, Harding and Phillips. Although set among an American religious sect, the film was shot on location in Australia. It was produced by Phillips with Silvio Salom, Mark Patterson, Grant Hardie and Vasili Papanicolou, and was backed by the South Australian Film Corporation and Sunjive Studios. Production wrapped in 2024, and the film was completed in March 2025. International sales were handled by Film Bridge International, which unveiled first footage to buyers at the American Film Market.

== Release ==
After completion, Diabolic screened at the Marché du Film through the Adelaide Film Festival's "Goes to Cannes" program. It went on to play Monster Fest 2025, where it won Best Australian Feature Film, and screened at the Adelaide Film Festival, where audience demand prompted an encore screening.

The film was released in Australian cinemas by Monster Pictures from 20 November 2025 as a series of special event screenings. A United States theatrical release followed in February 2026. It was later released on Blu-ray by Umbrella Entertainment in May 2026.

== Reception ==
Diabolic was received as a breakout genre success on the festival circuit, winning Best Australian Feature Film at Monster Fest 2025 and drawing strong enough audience demand at the Adelaide Film Festival to prompt an encore screening; it was also anticipated to contend at the AACTA Awards. Reviews from horror critics were generally positive, with particular praise for Elizabeth Cullen's lead performance and the film's gory final act.

Reviewing the film for Bloody Disgusting, Matthew Jackson wrote that its wild final act won him over. PopHorror called it a fresh take on religious horror and singled out Cullen's performance. Writing for Dread Central, Chad Collins praised it as old-school religious horror that builds to a gory payoff, though he found the lead-up a slow burn.

On the review aggregator website Rotten Tomatoes, 66% of 32 critics' reviews are positive.

== Accolades ==
Year	Award	Category	Result	Ref.
2025	Monster Fest	Best Australian Feature Film	Won	
