= Diabolical =

Diabolical may refer to:

- Evil, the profound immorality, especially when regarded as a supernatural force, for example in religious belief
- The Devil, believed in many religions, myths and cultures to be a supernatural entity that is the personification of evil and the enemy of God and humankind
- Diabolical, a 1998 studio album by the Swedish melodic black metal band Naglfar
- Diabolical, a 2001 studio album by the American rapper Mr. Lucci
- Diabolical (album), a 2022 studio album by the German thrash metal band Destruction
- The Diabolical, a 2015 American science fiction horror film
- The Boys Presents: Diabolical, a 2022 American adult animated superhero anthology spin-off of the television series The Boys

== See also ==
- Diabolic (disambiguation)
