= Samuel Hearne =

18th-century English explorer, fur-trader, and naturalist

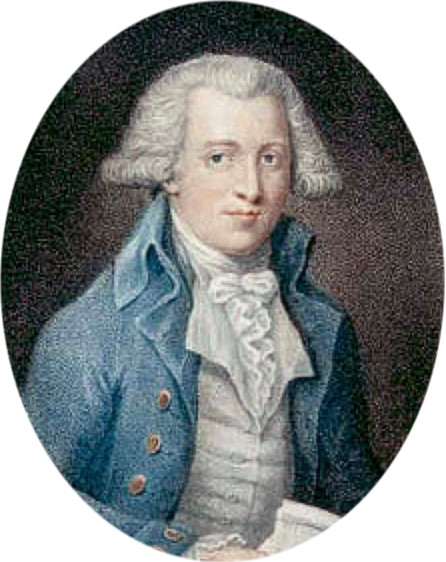
- Samuel Hearne
- Born: February 1745; London, England
- Died: November 1792 (aged 47); London, England
- Occupations: Explorer, author, governor
- Known for: Exploring

Samuel Hearne (February 1745 – November 1792) was an English explorer, fur-trader, writer and naturalist.

He was the first European to make an overland excursion across northern Canada to the Arctic Ocean, specifically to Coronation Gulf, via the Coppermine River. In 1774, Hearne built Cumberland House for the Hudson's Bay Company, its second interior trading post after Henley House and the first permanent settlement in present Saskatchewan.

== Biography ==
Samuel Hearne was born in February 1745 in London. Hearne's father was Secretary of the Waterworks of London Bridge, died in 1748. His mother's name was Diana, and his sister Sarah was three years younger than him. They moved to Netherbury in Dorset and Samuel was educated in Beaminster. Samuel Hearne joined the British Royal Navy in 1756 at the age of 11 as midshipman under the fighting captain Samuel Hood. He remained with Hood during the Seven Years' War, seeing considerable action during the conflict, including the bombardment of Le Havre in 1759. At the end of the war, having served in the English Channel and then the Mediterranean, he left the Navy in 1763. In February 1766, he joined the Hudson's Bay Company as a mate on the sloop Churchill, which was then engaged in the Inuit trade out of Prince of Wales Fort, near present-day Churchill, Manitoba. Two years later, he became mate on the Brigantine Charlotte and participated in the company's short-lived black whale fishery. In 1767, he found the shipwrecked remains of James Knight's 1719 expedition on Marble Island. In 1768, he examined portions of the Hudson Bay coasts with a view to improving the cod fishery. During this time, he gained a reputation for snowshoeing.

Hearne was able to improve his navigational skills by observing William Wales who was at Hudson Bay during 1768–1769 after being commissioned by the Royal Society to observe the Transit of Venus with Joseph Dymond.

== Exploration ==
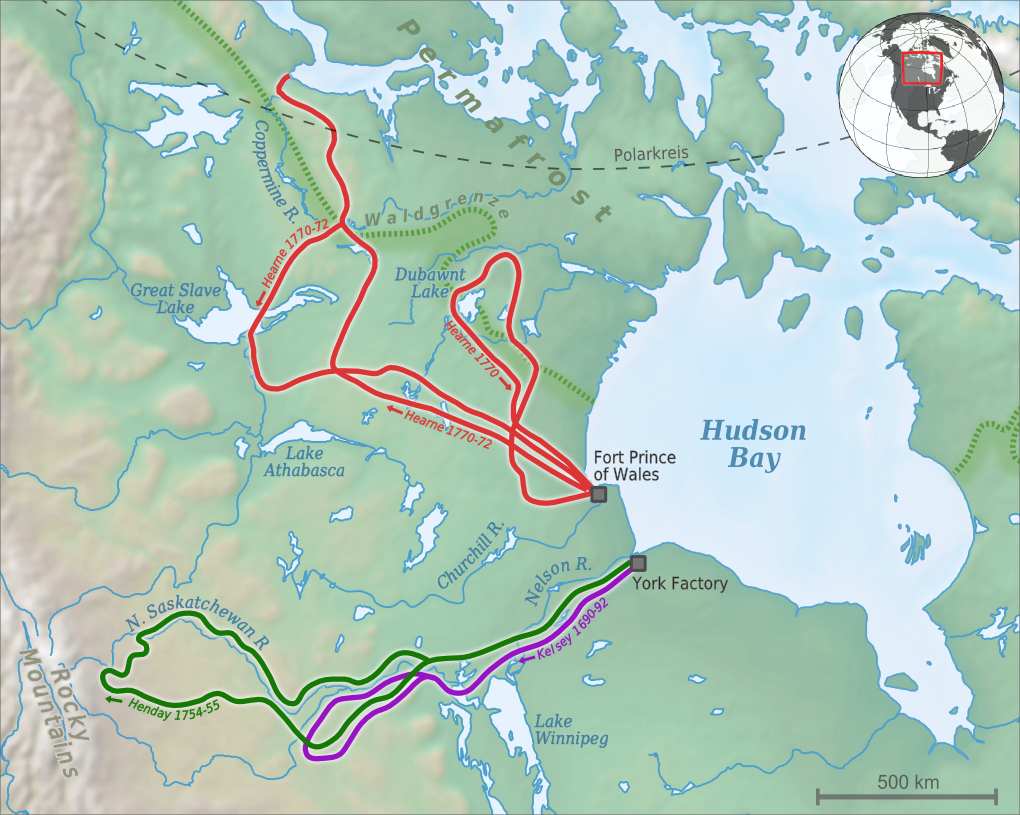
Map of Samuel Hearne's second and third expeditions (red)

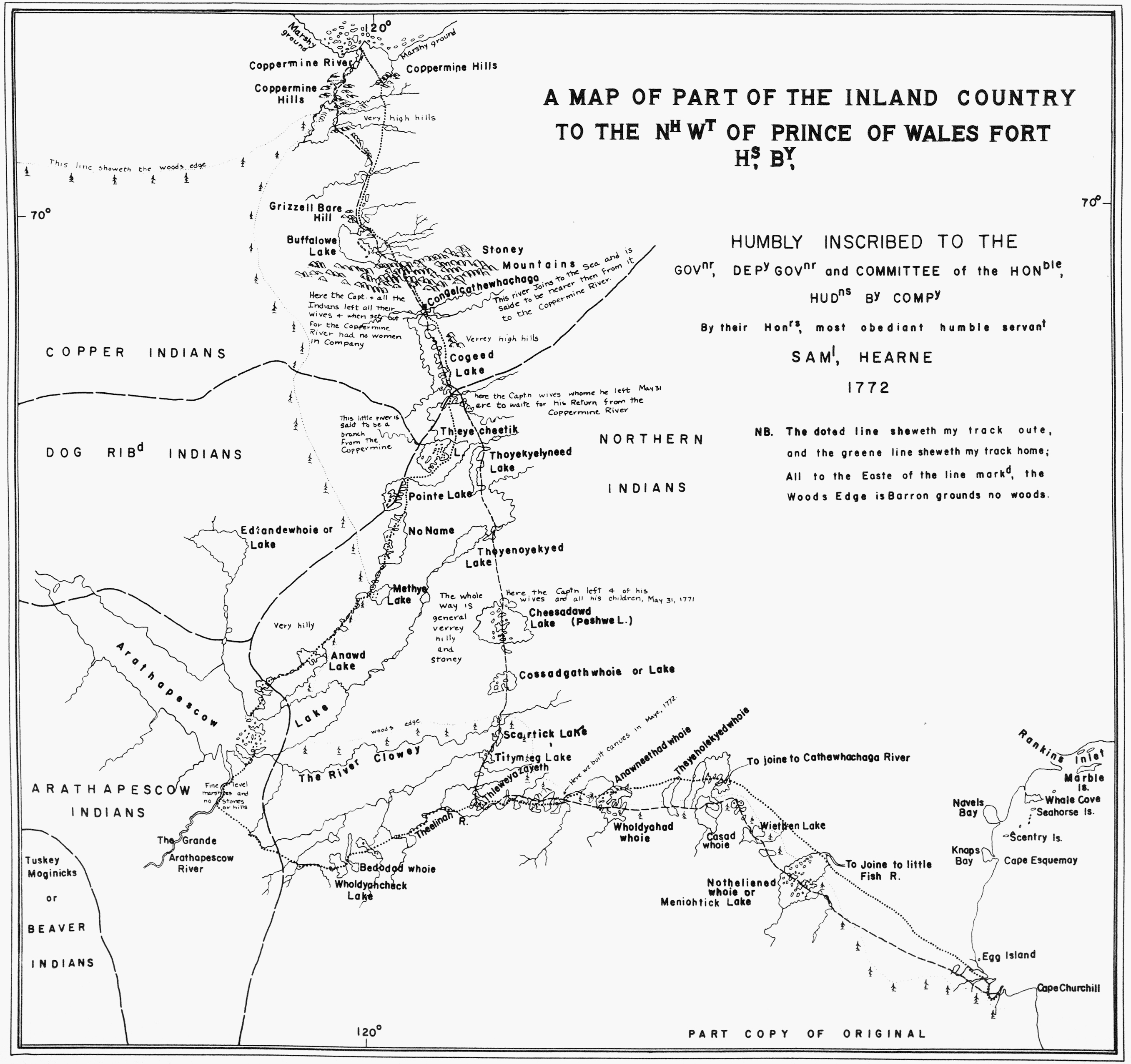
A 1969 rendering of a map that Samuel Hearne had created of the track of his third expedition.

=== Background / Motivation ===
The English on Hudson Bay had long known that the First Nations to the northwest used native copper, as indicated by such words as Yellowknife. When, in 1768, a northern First Nation (some say it was Matonabbee) brought lumps of copper to Churchill, the governor, Moses Norton, decided to send Hearne in search of a possible copper mine.

The basic theme of Hearne's three journeys was learning the methods of travel through this very difficult country and their dependence on First Nations who knew the land and how to live off of it.

=== First journey ===
Since there was no canoe route to the northwest, the plan was to go on foot over the frozen winter ground. Without canoes, they would have to carry as much food as possible and then live off the land.

Hearne planned to join a group of northern First Nations that had come to trade at Churchill and somehow induce them to lead him to the copper mine.

He left Churchill on 6 November 1769 along with two company employees, two Cree hunters and a band of Chipewyans and went north across the Seal River, an east–west river north of Churchill.

By 19 November their European provisions gave out and their hunters had found little game (Hearne had left too late in the season and the caribou had already left the Barren Grounds for the shelter of the forested country further south).

They headed west and north, finding only a few ptarmigan, fish and three stray caribou. The Indigenous people, who knew the country, had better sense than to risk starvation in this way and began deserting.

When the last First Nations left, Hearne and his European companions returned to the sheltered valley of the Seal River, where he was able to find venison, and reached Churchill on 11 December.

=== Second journey ===
Since he could not control the northern First Nations, Hearne proposed to try again using 'home guards', that is, Cree who lived around the post and hunted in exchange for European supplies. He left Churchill on 23 February.

Reaching the Seal River, he found good hunting and followed it west until he reached a large lake, probably Sethnanei Lake. Here he decided to wait for better weather and live by fishing. In April, the fish began to give out.

On 24 April, a large body of Indigenous people, mostly women, arrived from the south for the annual goose hunt. On 19 May, the geese arrived and there was now plenty to eat. They headed north and east past Baralzone Lake. By June, the geese had flown further north and they were again threatened with famine. At one point, they killed three muskoxen and had to eat them raw because it was too wet to light a fire.

They crossed the Kazan River above Yathkyed Lake where they found good hunting and fishing and then went west to Lake Dubawnt which is about 720 km (450 mi) northwest of Churchill.

On 14 August, his quadrant was destroyed, which accounts for the inaccuracy of latitudes on the remainder to this and the next journey.

At this point the sources become vague, but Hearne returned to Churchill in the autumn. On his return journey he met Matonabbee who was to be his guide on the next journey. Matonabbee may well have saved him from freezing or starving to death. Most of the land Hearne crossed on his second journey is very desolate and was not properly explored again until Joseph Tyrrell in 1893.

=== Third journey ===
Hearne contrived to travel as the only European with a group of Chipewyan guides led by Matonabbee. The group included eight of Matonabbee's wives to act as beasts of burden in the sledge traces, camp servant and cooks. This third expedition set out in December 1770, to reach the Coppermine River in summer, by which he could descend to the Arctic in canoes.

Matonabbee kept a fast pace, so fast they reached the great caribou traverse before provisions dwindled and in time for the spring hunt. Here Northern First Nations (Dene) hunters gathered to hunt the vast herds of caribou migrating north for the summer. A store of meat was laid up for Hearne's voyage and a band of "Yellowknife" Dene joined the expedition. Matonabbee ordered his women to wait for his return in the Athabasca country to the west.

The Dene were generally a mild and peaceful people, however, they were in a state of conflict with the Inuit. A great number of Yellowknife First Nations joined Hearne's party to accompany them to the Copper-mine River with intent to kill Inuit, who were understood to frequent that river in considerable numbers.

=== Bloody Falls ===
On 14 July 1771, they reached the Copper-mine River, a small stream flowing over a rocky bed in the "Barren Lands of the Little Sticks".

A few miles down the river, just above a cataract, were the domed wigwams of an Inuit camp. At 1 am on 17 July 1771 Matonabbee and the other Indigenous peoples fell upon the sleeping Inuit in a ruthless massacre. Approximately twenty men, women and children were killed; this would be known as the Massacre at Bloody Falls.

... a young girl, seemingly about eighteen years of age, [was] killed so near me, that when the first spear was stuck into her side she fell down at my feet, and twisted round my legs, so that it was with difficulty that I could disengage myself from her dying grasps. As two Indian men pursued this unfortunate victim, I solicited very hard for her life; but the murderers made no reply till they had stuck both their spears through her body ... even at this hour I cannot reflect on the transactions of that horrid day without shedding tears.

=== Return and results ===
A few days later, Hearne was the first European to reach the shore of the Arctic Ocean by an overland route. By tracing the Coppermine River to the Arctic Ocean he had established there was no Northwest Passage through the continent at lower latitudes.

This expedition also proved successful in its primary goal by discovering copper in the Coppermine River basin; however, an intensive search of the area yielded only one four-pound lump of copper and commercial mining was not considered viable.

Matonabbee led Hearne back to Churchill by a wide westward circle past Bear Lake in Athabasca Country.

In midwinter he became the first European to see and cross Great Slave Lake. Hearne returned to Fort Prince of Wales on 30 June 1772, having walked some 8,000 km (5,000 mi) and explored more than 650,000 km^{2} (250,000 sq mi).

== Later life ==
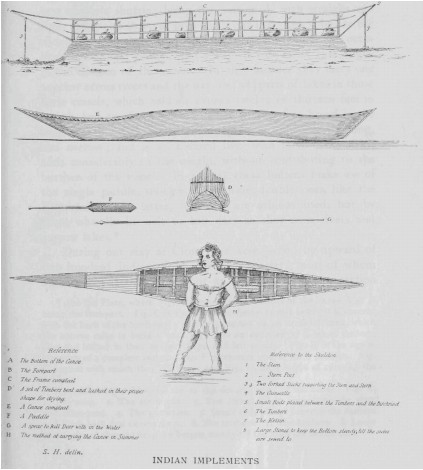
Illustration of canoe building at Lake Clowey (today McArthur Lake) from A Journey From Prince of Wales’s Fort in Hudson’s Bay to the Northern Ocean

Hearne was sent to Saskatchewan to establish Cumberland House, the second inland trading post for the Hudson's Bay Company in 1774 (the first being Henley House, established in 1743, 200 km or 120 mi up the Albany River). Having learned to live off the land, he took minimal provisions for the eight Europeans and two Home Guard Crees who accompanied him. After consulting some local chiefs, Hearne chose a strategic site on Pine Island Lake in the Saskatchewan River, 97 km (60 mi) above Fort Paskoya. The site was linked to both the Saskatchewan River trade route and the Churchill system.

He became governor of Fort Prince of Wales on 22 January 1776. On 8 August 1782 Hearne and his complement of 38 civilians were confronted by a French force under the comte de La Pérouse composed of three ships, including one of 74 guns, and 290 soldiers. As a veteran Hearne recognised hopeless odds and surrendered without a shot. Hearne and some of the other prisoners were allowed to sail back to England from Hudson Strait in a small sloop.

Hearne returned the next year but found trade had deteriorated. The First Nations population had been decimated by European-introduced diseases such as measles and smallpox, as well as starvation due to the lack of normal hunting supplies of powder and shot. Matonabbee had committed suicide and the rest of Churchill's leading First Nations had moved to other posts. Hearne's health began to fail and he delivered up command at Churchill on 16 August 1787 and returned to England.

In the last decade of his life he used his experiences on the barrens, on the northern coast, and in the interior to help naturalists like Thomas Pennant in their researches. His friend William Wales was a teacher at Christ's Hospital and he assisted Hearne to write A Journey from Prince of Wales's Fort in Hudson's Bay to the Northern Ocean. This was published in 1795, three years after Hearne's death of dropsy in November 1792 at the age of 47.

== Legacy ==
On 1 July 1767, he chiselled his name on smooth, glaciated stone at Sloop's Cove near Fort Prince of Wales where it remains today.

One of Wales's pupils, the poet Samuel Taylor Coleridge, made a brief notebook entry where he mentioned Hearne's book. Hearne may have been one of the inspirations for the Rime of the Ancient Mariner.

Hearne is mentioned by Charles Darwin in the sixth chapter of The Origin of Species:

In North America the black bear was seen by Hearne swimming for hours with widely open mouth, thus catching, like a whale, insects in the water.

Samuel Hearne's account of his exploration of the north, A Journey from Prince of Wales' Fort in Hudson's Bay to the Northern Ocean, originally published in 1795, was edited by Joseph Tyrrell and reprinted as part of the General Series of the Champlain Society.

There was a junior/senior high school named after him in Inuvik, Northwest Territories, between 1969 and 2013. A school in Toronto, Ontario, was also built in his name in 1973.
