= John Bean (cricketer) =

English cricketer and British Army officer

Personal information
- Full name: John Reginald Bean
- Born: 16 January 1913; Bangalore, Kingdom of Mysore, British India
- Died: 27 August 2005 (aged 92); Somerset, England
- Batting: Right-handed
- Bowling: Leg break

Career statistics
Competition	First-class
Matches	1
Runs scored	20
Batting average	10.00
100s/50s	–/–
Top score	19
Catches/stumpings	–/–
- Source: Cricinfo, 13 April 2019

John Reginald Bean (16 January 1913 – 27 August 2005) was an English first-class cricketer and British Army officer. His military career spanned from 1933–1956 with the Royal Artillery, during which he served in the Second World War. He also played first-class cricket for the British Army cricket team.

== Life and military career ==
Bean was born at Bangalore in January 1913, in what was then a part of British India. He was educated in England at Ampleforth College, before attending the Royal Military Academy, Woolwich. He graduated from Woolwich in August 1933, entering into the Royal Artillery as a second lieutenant. He made his only appearance in first-class cricket for the British Army cricket team against Cambridge University at Fenner's in May 1936. Batting twice in the match, he was dismissed for a single run in the Army's first-innings by William Rees-Davies, while in their second-innings he was dismissed for 19 runs by Jahangir Khan.

In August 1936, he was promoted to the rank of lieutenant. He served in the Royal Artillery in the Second World War, during which he was promoted to the rank of captain in August 1941. He was promoted to the rank of major in August 1946. He was promoted to the rank of lieutenant colonel in January 1955. He retired from active service in May 1956, upon which he was placed on the reserve of officers list. Having exceeded the age for recall, he ceased to belong to the reserve of officers in January 1968. He died in Somerset in August 2004.
