= King George (1783 ship) =

British merchant ship and whaler 1783–1824

History

Great Britain
- Builder: Thames
- Launched: 1783
- Fate: Condemned 1824

General characteristics
- Tons burthen: 300, or 330, or 334, or 346 (bm)
- Armament: 2 × 6-pounder guns (1810)

King George was built on the Thames in 1783 as a West Indiaman. From 1817 she made four voyages as a whaler in the British southern whale fishery. She was condemned at Guayaquil in 1824 on her fifth.

== Career ==
King George first appeared in Lloyd's Register (LR) in 1783 with O'Brian, master, Neave & Co., owners, and trade London–Antigua.

Year	Master	Owner	Trade	Source & notes
1790	O'Brian	A.Wilcock	London–Antigua	LR; damages and good repair 1790
1795	O'Brian	A.Wilcock; Neave & Co.	London–Dominica	LR; damages repaired 1790
1800	O'Brian	Neave & Co.	London–Dominica	RS; damages repaired 1790
1805	J.Cotter	Neave & Co.	London–St Vincent	LR; damages repaired 1790 & good repair 1800
1810	J.Cotter	Neave & Co.	London–St Vincent	RS; damages repaired 1790 & good repair 1800
1816	J.Cotter	Neave & Co.	London–St Vincent	RS; damages repaired 1790 & good repair 1800
1818	F.Todrig	Neave & Co.	London–South Seas	LR; good repair 1813

1st whaling voyage (1817–1818): Captain Francis Todrig sailed from London on 9 May 1817. King George returned on 29 March 1818 with 490 casks of whale oil and 160 seal skins.

2nd whaling voyage (1818–1819): From this voyage Todrig & Co. owned King George. Captain Kemp sailed on 16 June 1818 for the South Seas.King George, Kemp, master, returned on 29 October 1819 with 250 casks of whale oil, fins, and two seal skins.

3rd whaling voyage (1820–1821): Captain Thomas Duell (or Dewell), sailed from London on 8 February 1820, bound for the coast of Africa. On 10 June she was in Mossel Bay. On 10 August 1820 she was at Saint Helena, having come from the coast of Africa. On 13 August she sailed for the Brazil coast. On 10 April 1821 she sailed from Saint Helena for England. King George returned on 24 July 1821 with 650 casks of whale oil, the fins of three whales, and 1,550 seal skins.

4th whaling voyage (1821–1822): Captain Todrig sailed from Deal on 17 October 1821, bound for the South Seas. On 29 October she sailed from Torbay, still bound for the South Seas. On 31 March 1822 King George was at South Georgia with three tons of oil.

Year	Master	Owner	Trade	Source
1821	Todrig; Brian	Todrig	London–South Seas	LR; good repair 1815 & thorough repair 1821

5th whaling voyage (1823–Loss): King George, Bryan, master, arrived at the Cape of Good Hope on 1 February 1823 from Tristan da Cunha. The "King George Whaler", Captain Charles Bryan, sailed on 25 April from the Cape. On 17 July the whaler King George, Captain Charles Bryant, from England, via the Cape, in ballast, put into Storm Bay Passage (Derwent River (Tasmania)), to join Thalia, for the whaling season. In late September King George, and her tender, the 28-ton (bm) sloop Success, Anderson, master, came into Hobart. (Note: Success had been built at South Georgia some years earlier. Success and King George had arrived together at Tristan da Cunha from London and were at the Cape together. They then sailed and came to separate. Success went to first to Amsterdam Island and then St Paul Island. There Success failed to find King George and so sailed on to Van Diemen's Land. However, she did find at St Paul's survivors from Princess of Wales, which had wrecked on 18 March 1821 in the Crozet Islands. She took on board three of the survivors and carried them to Van Diemen's Land. Success arrived there 10 days before King George.) (Note: Princess of Wales, of 75 or 80 tons (bm), was launched at Broadstairs in 1796 as a Margate hoy. She was rebuilt in 1815. She had been on her first seal hunting voyage.)

King George sailed again in November for New Zealand. On 19 October 1824 Lloyd's List reported that King George "Whaler, late Bryan", had been condemned at Guayaquil.
