= King George (1787 ship) =

History

France
- Launched: 1775
- Captured: c.1783

Great Britain
- Name: Enterprize
- Acquired: 1783
- Renamed: 1783:Sally; 1787:King George
- Fate: Wrecked 1791

General characteristics
- Tons burthen: 278, or 294, or 300 (bm)
- Armament: 6 guns

King George was launched in France in 1775 under another name, possibly as Enterprize. She became a Bristol-based slave ship. Under the name Sally she made three slave-trading voyages between 1783 and 1786. Then from 1787 on as King George she made three more complete slave-trading voyages. She was lost at Barbados in 1791 on her seventh voyage with the loss of 280 of the 360 slaves on board.

== Career ==
=== Sally ===
Sally first appeared in Lloyd's Register (LR) in 1783 with J.Langdon, master, changing to A.Robe, J.Cross & Co., owners, and trade Bristol–Quebec, changing to Bristol–Africa. She was formerly Enterprize, but as such does not appear in the 1782 LR, leaving open the possibility that that was the name of the French vessel that became Sally.

1st slave voyage (1783–1784): Captain Archibald Robe sailed from Bristol on 27 July 1783. Sally gathered her slaves at Bonny and on 26 January 1784 delivered 380, or 410 slaves at Grenada. She had left Bristol with 46 crew members and arrived at Grenada with 41. Two crew members had died at Bonny and three at sea on the way to Grenada. She discharged 15 crew men at Grenada, and enlisted nine; she arrived at Bristol with 34 crew members, one having died on the journey. She sailed from Grenada on 5 March and arrived back at Bristol on 25 April.

Profitability: Her owners invested £10660 9s 9d, including £6,238 10s 1d in trade goods for the purchase of the slaves. The net proceeds from the voyage were £13,411 19s 3d, for a 26% rate of return. If one subtracts out the outlays for trading goods, the rate of return on the capital represented by Sally herself (valued at £2,850), was 55%.

2nd slave voyage (1784–1785): Captain Archibald Robe sailed from Bristol on 7 July 1784. Sally gathered her slaves at Bonny and on 4 February 1785 arrived at Grenada with 448; she landed 443. She had left Bristol with 47 crew members and arrived at Grenada with 39. At Grenada, she discharged 16 crew men and enlisted 10, returning to Bristol with 33. She sailed from Grenada on 19 March and arrived back at Bristol on 20 May.

Profitability: Her owners invested £11758 11s 10d in the voyage, including £2850 for Sally. (The rest was for outfitting and trade goods .) The net proceeds from the voyage were £12,594 19s 9d, for a 7% rate of return. If one subtracts out the outlays for outfitting and trade goods, the rate of return on the capital represented by Sally herself was 29%.

3rd slave voyage (1785–1786): Captain Alexander Robe sailed from Bristol on 22 July 1785. Sally gathered her slaves at Bonny and on 5 May 1786 arrived at Saint Vincent with 330. She had left Bristol with 44 crew members and arrived at Saint Vincent with 38. She discharged four crew members there. She sailed from Saint Vincent on 24 June and arrived back at Bristol on 4 August.

New owners renamed her King George, but continued to sail her in the slave trade.

=== King George ===
King George first appeared in LR in 1787 with A.Robe, master, Jones & Co., owner, and trade Bristol–Africa. She had undergone a thorough repair in 1787.

4th slave voyage (1787–1788): Captain Alexander Robe sailed from Bristol on 31 May 1787. King George gathered her slaves at Bonny and on 29 December delivered 415 slaves at Kingston. She had left Bristol with 40 crew members and she had 33 when she arrived at Kingston. She discharged 22 crew members and enlisted seven. She left on 29 January 1788 and arrived back at Bristol on 12 April. She put into Milford Haven on her way back as she had lost four crew members and a mast in a gale off Bermuda.

5th slave voyage (1788–1789): Captain Robe sailed from Bristol on 14 June 1788. King George gathered her slaves at Bonny and on 23 January 1789 delivered 361 to Grenada. She had left Bristol with 40 crew members and she had 38 when she arrived at Grenada. She discharged four crew there. She left on 7 February and arrived back at Bristol on 26 March.

6th slave voyage (1789–1790): Captain Robe sailed from Bristol 5 July 1789. King George gathered her slaves at Bonny and on 18 January 1790 delivered them to Grenada. She had left Bristol with 37 crew members and she had 36 when she arrived at Grenada. She had enlisted two crew at Bonny. She discharged seven at Grenada and enlisted one. When she arrived back at Bristol she still had 30 crew members. She arrived back at Bristol on 25 February.

4th slave voyage (1790–1791): Captain Benjamin Howard sailed from Bristol on 11 August 1790. King George gathered her slaves at Bonny and on 26 March 1791 arrived off Barbados. She had left Bristol with 36 crew members.

== Fate ==
King George was lost at Barbados in 1791 on the vessel's seventh voyage; 280 of the 360 slaves on board drowned. She was wrecked on the eastern side of the island as she was arriving. Two crew members, of 36, were also lost.

Her entry in Lloyd's Register for 1791 carried the annotation "Lost". She was insured at Lloyd's of London for £10,000.
