= John Bean (explorer) =

John Bean (fl. 1751–1757) was an explorer and mariner employed by the Hudson's Bay Company and involved in voyages to the Prince of Wales Fort.

Bean was second mate on the Churchill sloop from 1751 to 1753. Part of Churchill's mandate was to explore the coast during her summer trading voyage north among the Eskimos. No serious attempt was made to accomplish this during these three voyages.

After these years, Bean was made master of the sloop and in 1755 and 1756 explored extensively during the summer season. His detailed journals tell of his exploration of the dangerous coast and reveal a resourceful and courageous man.
