= King George (1781 ship) =

Hudson's Bay Company ship and whaler 1781–1822

History

Great Britain
- Name: King George
- Ordered: 14 September 1780
- Builder: Randall & Brent, Thames
- Launched: 7 March 1781
- Fate: Foundered 1822

General characteristics
- Tons burthen: 280, or 286, or 290, or 303 (bm)
- Complement: 1793:45; 1808:32
- Armament: 1781:6 × 12-pounder + 10 × 9-pounder + 2 × 6-pounder guns; 1793: 18 × 9-pounder guns + 6swivel guns; 1805: 8 × 6-pounder + 8 × 9-pounder guns; 1808: 2 × 6-pounder guns + 14 × 12-pounder carronades; 1814: 2 × 6-pounder guns + 14 × 12-pounder carronades

King George was launched on the Thames in 1781. She spent about three-quarters of her career sailing for the Hudson's Bay Company (HBC), and was the third vessel by her name to sail for the HBC. She then spent the last quarter of her career as a whaler in the British northern whale fishery. She foundered there without a trace in 1822.

== Career ==
King George first appeared in Lloyd's Register (LR) in 1781 with J[oseph] Richards, master, the Hudson's Bay Company, owners, and trade London–Hudson's Bay. From then through 1811 she sailed for the Hudson's Bay Company (HBC) under a variety of masters.

On 8 April 1793, shortly after the outbreak of war with France Captain John Richards acquired a letter of marque. (Note: John Richards was the son of Captain Joseph Richards, who had died at Stromness on 19 June 1782.) Captain Richards was dismissed the company's service on 18 February 1801, after he admitted to having smuggled furs, "contrary to the Duty" he owed the HBC.

His replacement was Captain John Turner, who had spent a decade as the captain of the HBC's Queen Charlotte.

On 2 May 1808 Captain John Tinner (or Turner), acquired a letter of marque. Also in 1808, the ice was the heaviest and closest it had been in 41 years.

The HBC sold King George in May 1811 to Daniel and Samuel Brent & Sons. The Brents chartered her back to the HBC for a period and later offered to sell her back to the company for £5,400, an offer the HBC declined.

On 18 August 1813 King George and Eddystone arrived at Hudson Bay.

She then became a Northern Fisheries whaler, possibly after the Brents sold her to Elvgin & Co.

Year	Master	Owner	Trade	Source
1814	P.Turner; J.Gordon	Brent	London–Davis Strait	Register of Shipping; large repair 1806

On 19 April 1814 Lloyd's List reported that King George, Gordon, master, had had to put into Aberdeen leaky while sailing to the whaling grounds at Davis Strait. Two American privateers, one of them Scourge, had chased her in.

The following data is from Coltish:

Year	Master	Where	Whales	Tuns whale oil
1814	Gordon	Davis Strait	3	32
1815	Patterson	Davis Strait	14	83
1816	Patterson	Greenland	23	162
1817	Patterson	Greenland	14	106
1818	Patterson	Greenland	9	101
1819	Patterson	Greenland	22	138
1820	Patterson	Greenland	15	172
1821	Patterson	Greenland	6	42
1822	Proven	Davis Strait	3	0

== Fate ==
King George, Proven, master, sailed from Gravesend on 4 April 1822 for Greenland. She was reported to have been there on 5 July with three fish.

King George was then presumed to have been lost with all hands in the Davis Strait.
