= King George Packet (1802 Berwick ship) =

History

United Kingdom
- Name: King George Packet
- Operator: Old Shipping Company (Note: The London and Leith Old Ship Company had been founded in Berwick but transferred to Leith early in the 19th century.)
- Launched: 1802, Berwick
- Fate: Abandoned at sea in December 1832

General characteristics
- Tons burthen: 137 (bm)
- Sail plan: Smack
- Armament: 6 × 18-pounder carronades + 2 × 6-pounder guns

King George Packet was a smack launched in 1802 in Berwick-on-Tweed for the Old Shipping Company of Berwick. She sailed as a packet between Leith and London until 1825. Berwick smacks were sloops that could make the voyage between Berwick and London in two days. In late 1825, she became a Leith-based coaster. New owners then sailed her between London and the Continent. In 1826 she suffered a minor maritime mishap. Her crew abandoned her at sea in 1832; she was last listed in Lloyd's Register (LR), in the volume for 1833.

== Career ==
King George Packet first appeared in Lloyd's Register (LR) in 1802.

Year	Master	Owner	Trade	Source & notes
1802	J[ohn] Ramsay	Old Shipping Company	Leith–London	LR
1809	J.Ramsay; Haliburton	Old Shipping Company	Leith–London	LR
1814	Haliburton; Creighton	Old Shipping Company	Leith–London	LR; thorough repair 1814
1818	Creighton; A.Gordon	Old Shipping Company	Leith–London	LR; thorough repair 1814 & 1815
1821	J.Ramsey	Old Shipping Company	Leith–London	LR; thorough repair 1815
1825	J.Ramsey	Old Shipping Company	Leith coaster	LR; thorough repair 1815
1826	J.Hart	Hart & Co.	London–Rotterdam	LR – listed as King George; thorough repair 1815

On 15 September 1826, King George Packet, Mockett, master, put into Ramsgate leaky. She had struck the Whitedike while sailing from Rotterdam to Liverpool. The next report was that she would have to unload her cargo to undergo repairs. On 28 October, she left the dock, having undergone a thorough repair.

Year	Master	Owner	Trade	Source & notes
1828	R.Willis	DeBie & Co.	London–Rotterdam	LR; good repair 1827
1833	R.Willis	DeBie & Co.	London–Copenhagen	LR; good repair 1827

== Fate ==
King George (or King George Packet) was abandoned in the North Sea off Robin Hoods Bay, in early December. King George Packet was last listed in Lloyd's Register in 1833.
