= Prince of Wales Fort =

Historic fortress in Manitoba, Canada

- Churchill, Manitoba, Canada
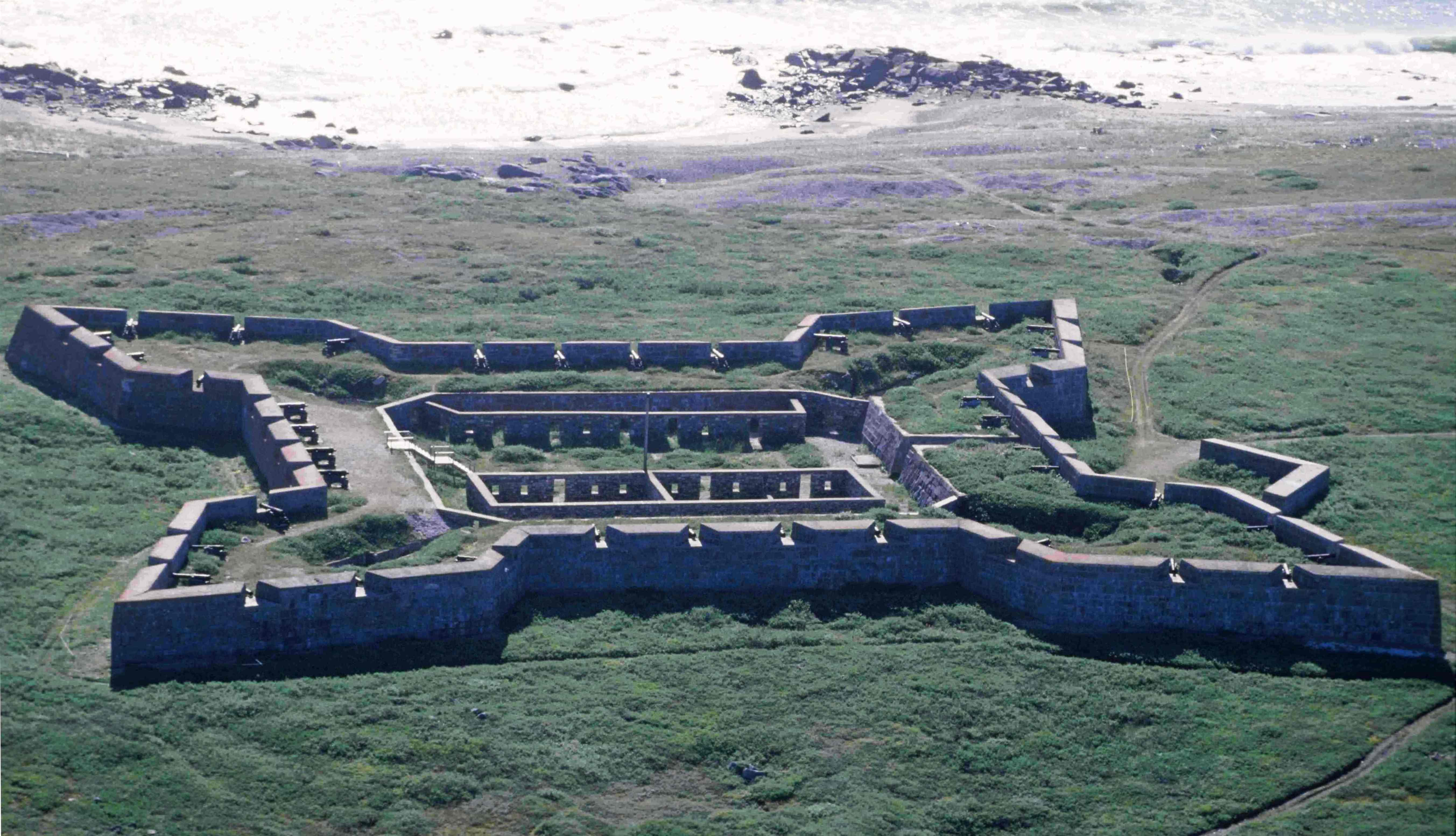
- Prince of Wales Fort

Site information
- Type: Fortress
- Condition: Partially restored

Location
- Location within Canada
- Coordinates: 58°47′49.77″N 94°12′48.34″W

Site history
- Built: 1717 (log fort) and 1731–1771
- In use: 1717–1782
- Battles/wars: Hudson Bay expedition (1782)

National Historic Site of Canada
- Official name: Prince of Wales Fort National Historic Site of Canada
- Designated: 1920

Prince of Wales Fort is a historic bastion fort on Hudson Bay across the Churchill River from Churchill, Manitoba, Canada. It is the oldest building in the country west of Ontario, and the northernmost fort in North America. It is a National Historic Site in the national park system.

== History ==
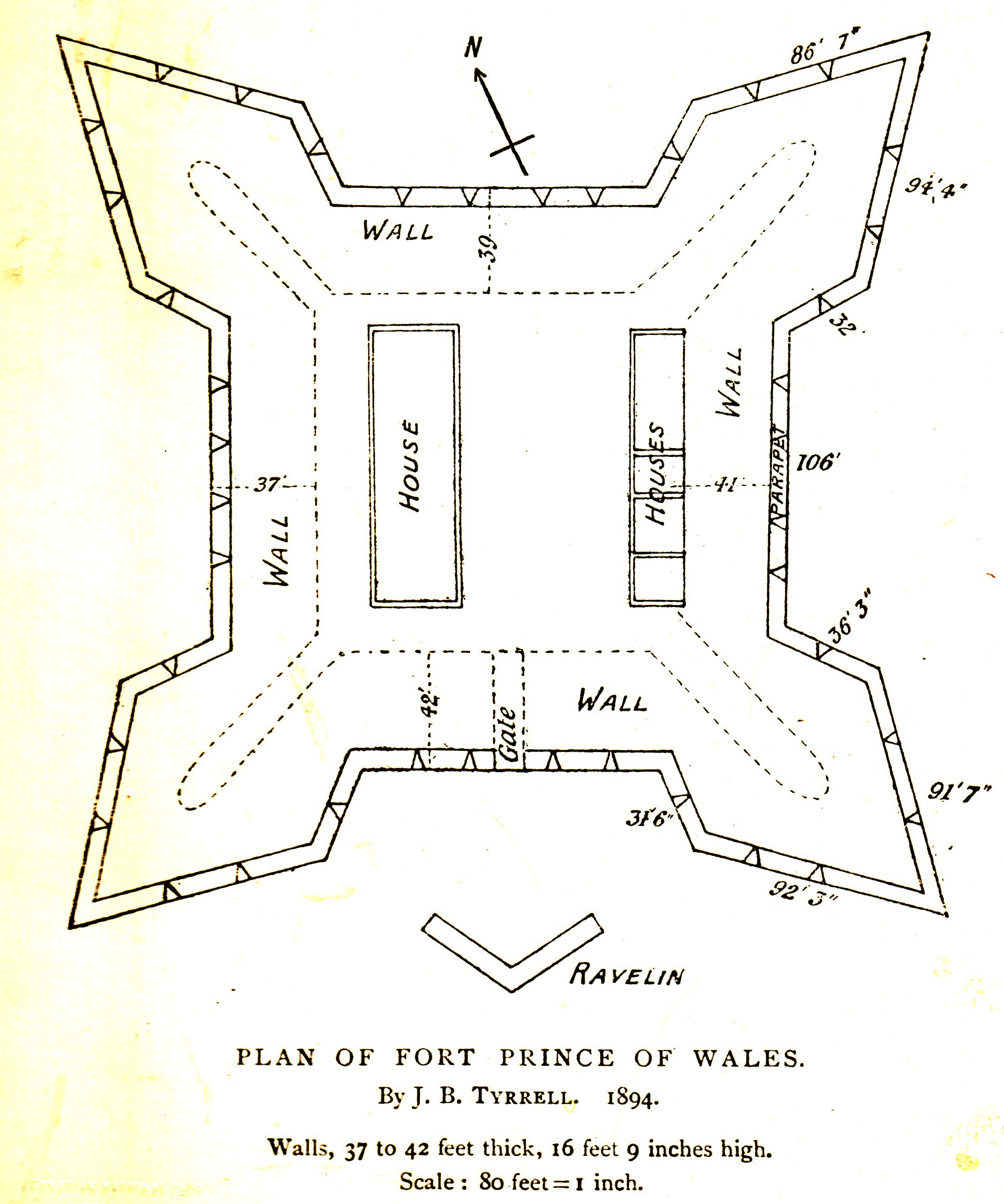
Plan of the fort

The European history of this area starts with Henry Hudson sailing into Hudson Bay in 1610. The area was recognized as important in the fur trade and of potential importance for other discoveries. The fort is built in a star shape.

=== Original (wood) fort ===
This fort began as a log fort built in 1717 by James Knight of the Hudson's Bay Company (HBC) and was originally called the Churchill River Post. In 1719, the post was renamed Prince of Wales Fort. It was located on the west bank of the Churchill River to protect and control the HBC's interests in the fur trade.

=== Construction of the present stone fort ===
The original wooden fort was replaced by a massive stone fort, probably to abide by the Royal Charter which required that Rupert's Land should be fortified.

Construction of this fort was started in 1731 near what was then called Eskimo Point. It was in the form of a square, with sides 90 m (300 ft) long and walls 6 m (20 ft) tall and 9 m (30 ft) thick at the base.

It had forty-two cannon mounted on the walls. The cannon were massive, some weighing as much as 2,500 kg (5,500 lb), built to fire nine, eighteen and 24-pound balls. There was also a battery across the river on Cape Merry meant to hold six more cannon.

=== In battle ===
In the 1780s, the French government launched a Hudson Bay expedition to disrupt HBC activities in the bay. Three French warships, led by Jean-François de La Pérouse, captured the Prince of Wales Fort in 1782. The fort was manned by only 39 non-military personnel at the time, and its governor, Samuel Hearne, recognized the numerical and military imbalance and surrendered without a shot being fired. The French partially destroyed the fort, but its mostly intact ruins survive to this day.

The fort returned to the HBC in 1783. Thereafter, its importance waned with the decline of the fur trade, although the post was later refounded a short distance up the river.

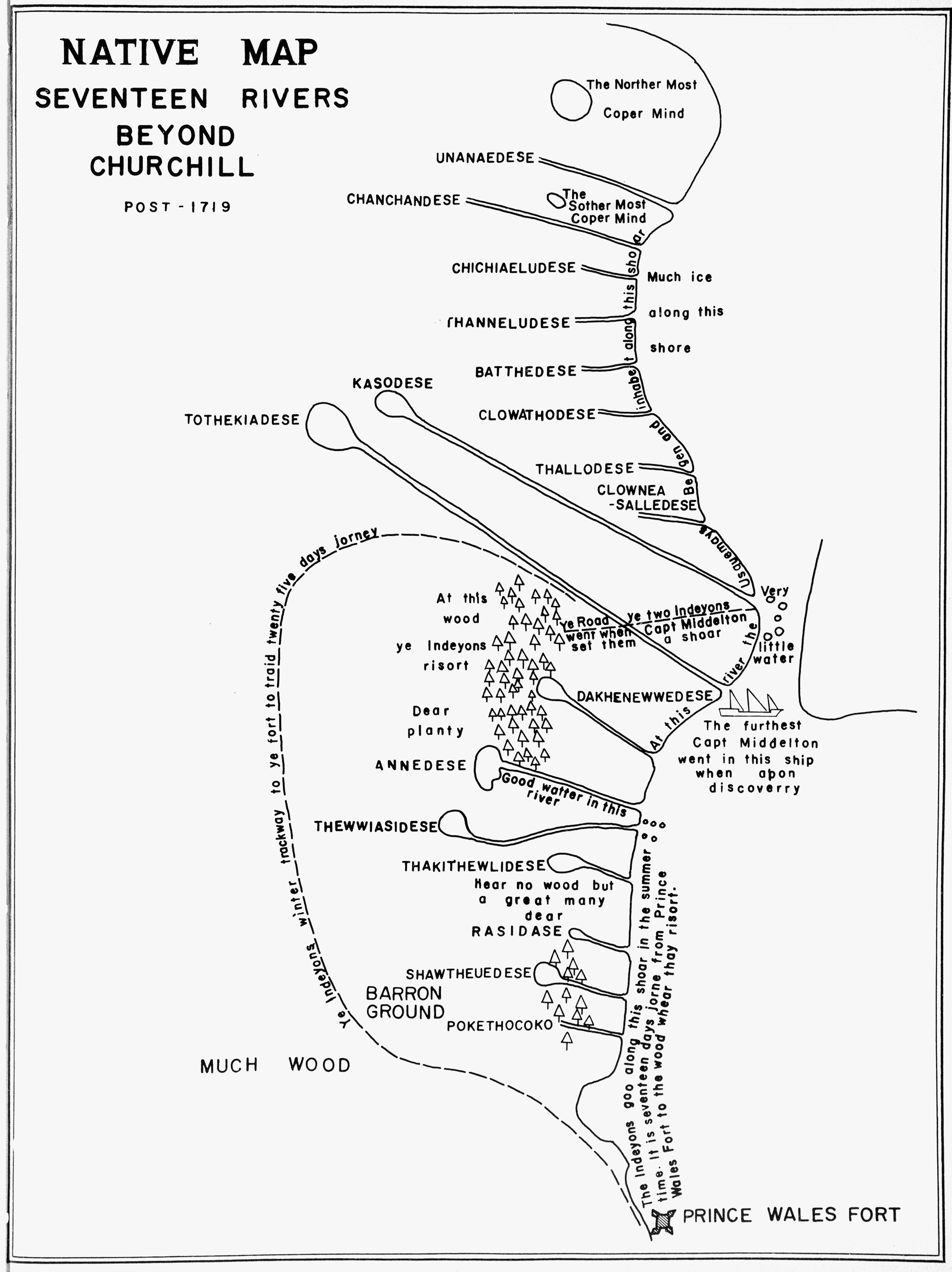
Map of Prince of Wales Fort prepared in black ink by R.I. Ruggles, from original manuscript (map G. 1/19) in the Archives, Hudson's Bay Company, London.

== Structures ==
The remains of these buildings still stand in the Fort, although none of them are intact, with roofs long since deteriorated.

- Rough Stone Dwelling House
- Governor's Quarters
- Storehouse
- Men's Quarters and Barracks
- Stonemason's Workshop
- Cooper and Carpenter Workshops
- Tailor's Room
- Blacksmith Shop

The courtyard is intact and all other exposed areas covered by grass.

=== Cape Merry Battery ===
Opposite the fort across the mouth of the Churchill River is Cape Merry Battery. The battery was named for former HBC Deputy Governor (1712–1718) Captain John Merry (1656–1729). The fixed battery was built three times. The first was built sometime after 1718 and featured a wall protected by cannon(s) and powder magazine. Only remaining parts are the ruins of the door of the magazine and parts of the wall. A second battery was built in 1747 further south and away from the river due to concerns that the first battery could be used to attack the fort. A third was rebuilt in 1959-1960 from second as a restoration process. The battery today has a single cannon.

== Restoration ==
After the construction of the Hudson Bay Railway to Churchill was completed in 1929, railway labour and railway construction equipment was used to restore the fort. Restoration work was also performed in the late 1950s.

Archaeological investigations at and around the fort began in 1958.

Since 2005, Parks Canada archaeologists have been working in and around the fort in conjunction with a large-scale wall stabilization work and a fort interpretation program.

== Legacy ==
In 1920, the site was designated a National Historic Site.

A series of journals written by explorer Samuel Hearne on a journey from Prince of Wales Fort in Hudson's Bay to the Northern Ocean was published by the Champlain Society in 1911.

Charles Tuttle's 1885 book Our North Land describes the fort at that time.

On 28 June 1985, Canada Post issued 'Fort Prince of Wales, Man.', one of the 20 stamps in the "Forts Across Canada Series".

The fort is the subject of one of the National Film Board's Canada Vignettes.

== See also ==
- John Bean, explorer who voyaged to the fort
- Nathaniel Bishop, master of the fort
