= Tuku'aho =

Tuku’aho was the 14th Tu’I Kanokupolu of Tonga, reigning approximately from 1793 to 1799. He was considered the “strong man” of the Tupou family despite coming from a lower lineage, and he used his power to depose the 12th Tu’I Kanokupolu, Tupoumoheofo, who was of the higher line. Tuku’aho placed instilled his own father, Mumui, as the 13th Tu’I Kanokupolu and then took the title for himself upon Mumui's death. Tuku’aho reigned Tonga as a tyrant, for which he was assassinated by a team of high chiefs. His death sparked a civil war that lasted for nearly a half century.

== War with Tupoumoheofo ==
Around the year 1792, when Mukuiha’ame’a vacated his title of Tu’i Kanokupolu, the recently deceased Tu’i Tonga's high ranking wife Tupoumoheofo declared herself the replacement. Historians debate the appropriateness of her action as a female, but the immediate result was to incense Tuku’aho, who hoped for and expected the title to pass on to his father. From ‘Eua where he was now governor, Tuku’aho began publicly denouncing Tupoumoheofo. He further instigated conflict by seizing some of her estates.

Tupoumoheofo would not step down. Mumui, Tuku’aho, and Tupoumoheofo all shared ancestry through Ma’afu’otu’itonga, the 6th Tu’I Kanokupolu, but Tupoumoheofo’s branch was of higher rank, which helped give her support among many of the Tongatapu chiefs.

With Tupoumoheofo in power for less than a full year, probably around the year 1793, Tuku’aho attacked her supporters with an army, chasing her into the protection of the powerful chiefs of Hihifo. In the face of overwhelming force, the chiefs negotiated her exile to Ha’apai, leaving Tuku’aho to implant Mumui as the 13 Tu’I Kanokupolu and Ma’ulupekotofa as Tu’I Tonga.

The exiled Tupoumoheofo made one last attempt to reclaim her title by raising an army and attacking Tongatapu, but she was repelled and chased back to Kauvai Island in northern Ha’apai, where her army was slaughtered. Tupoumoheofo survived and returned to Vava’u. She made no more attempts to regain power.

== Mumui as Tu’I Kanokupolu ==
Mumui helped bring stability after a brief period of war. By 1795 the three main chiefly titles of Tu’i Kanokupolu, Tu’i Ha’atakalaua, and Tu’i Tonga had been restored to “men with solid traditional claims of descent and fitness. Just before he died, he tried maintaining stability by trying to pass his Tu’I Kanokupolu title on to Mulikihame’a, who was the next most “premier” chief on Tongatapu and came from a more superior branch of the family lineage. He had also previously held the title as the 11th Tu’i Kanokupolu before he was likely forced to resign in 1790 or 1791. The choice of Mulikihame’a was in line with the Tongan tradition of adelphic succession and was unlikely to cause any political problems. Some surmise that Mumui passed over his own son because he anticipated Tuku’aho's "excesses and cruelties" of power.

== Tuku’aho as Tu’I Kanokupolu ==
Though Mumui could strongly suggest his own replacement, the decision of the next Tu’i Kanokupolu was made by election of the chiefs of Ngata in Hihigo. Tuku’afo felt indignant by being passed over for the title, having most likely placed his father as Tu’I Kanokupolu to improve the power of their lineage and receive the title in the future. As the “strong man” of the Tupou family, Tuku’aho convinced the chiefs to elect him as the 14th Tu’i Kanokupolu. The action steered power towards a lesser lineage and angered many chiefs.

Tuku’aho behaved as a tyrant. He waged war against Ha’apai and Vava’u, spreading “havoc” and “fear” throughout Tonga. A European eyewitness described Tuku’aho tying enemies to trees and burning them alive. Other missionaries said he cut off the hand of a man who had committed a misdemeanor. Another was “bound with stretched arms and two women were made to put burning torches under his armpits. He had the left arm of twelve of his cooks amputated not to punish any crime but as a “personal reminder to make clear that they were his.”. One woman was sawed in half while still alive. William Mariner, a British sailor stranded in Tonga from 1806 to 1810 described Tuku’aho's reputation as “of a vindictive and cruel turn of mind, taking every opportunity to exert his authority; and frequently in a manner not only cruel but wanton”, though it must be said that Mariner's host was Tuku’aho's enemy, Finau Ulukalala II.

== Assassination ==
Tuku’aho earned many enemies due to his tyranny and ignorance of traditional succession. The April 1799 ritual reburial of 18th Tu’i Ha’atakalaua, Toafunaki, brought chiefs from many Tongan islands, and a group of them decided to assassinate Tuku’aho. They were led by Tupouniua who felt particularly oppressed by Tuku’aho's reign. He was joined by many power men such as Finau ‘Ulukalala II, Mulikiha’ame’a, and Fatafehi Fuanunuiava. Finau ‘Ulukalala was avenging his father, Finau ‘Ulukalala I, who was not given the governorship of Vav’u by Tuku’aho that he thought he deserved. Mulikiha’ame’a was still angry at not receiving the Tu’i Kanokupolu title years earlier. Fatafehi Fuanunuiava, the son of the 36thTu’I Tonga Paulaho, also felt eligible for the Tu’i Kanokupolu title.

William Mariner describes the assassination in detail:

“About midnight they again repaired to [Tuku’aho’s] house with [the plotters], whom they placed around it as watchful guards, ready to despatch all who might attempt to escape from the place. Of these Finow [Finau] took the command, whilst Toobo Nuha [Tupouniua] entered, armed with his axe, and burning with desire of revenge. As he passed along, on either hand lay the wives and favourite mistresses of the king...He sought the mat of his destined victim, where he lay buried in the profoundest sleep. He stood over him for a short moment, but willing that he should know from whome he received his death, he struck him with his hand upon the face. Togoo Ahoo [Tuku’aho] started up, -‘Tis I, Toobo Nuha that strike!” and a tremendous blow felled him, never to rise again.”

The solidarity of the conspirators did not last long. Contests for power devolved into chaos in Tongatapu with Finau ‘Ulukalala becoming ruling warlord over Ha’apai and Tupouniua his deputy in Vava’u. Thus began the civil wars that wouldn't end until the 1845 unification of Tonga under Taufa’ahau (a grandson of Tuku’aho).
