= Velvet Elvis =

Painting of Elvis Presley on velvet

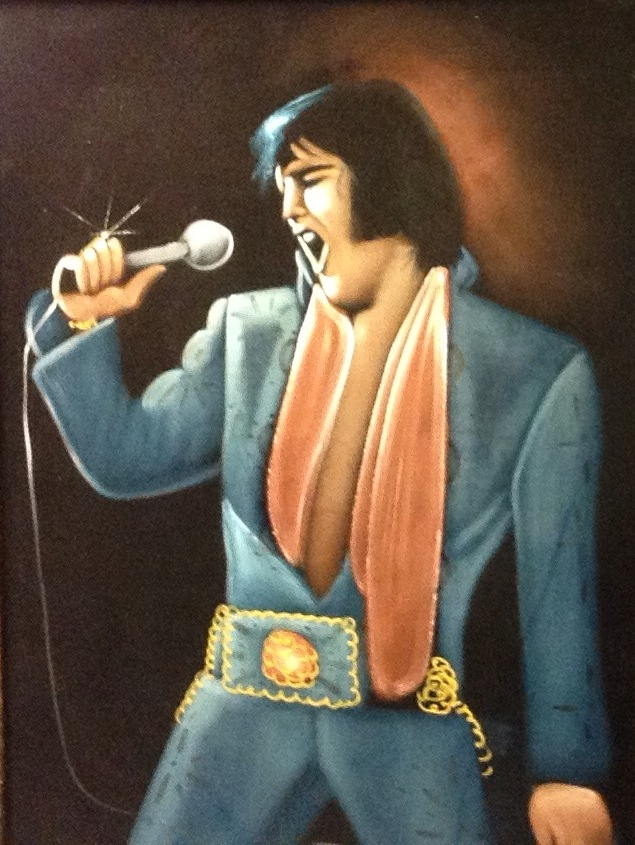
A Velvet Elvis painting

A Velvet Elvis is a painting of Elvis Presley on velvet. It typically represents a costumed torso of Elvis holding a microphone, painted on black velvet (or velvet of some other dark color, such as navy blue, red or purple). This iconic velvet painting is considered an archetypical example of kitsch.

A brief history of black velvet paintings is presented by Pamela Liflander in Black Velvet Artist, a booklet published by Running Press, Philadelphia in 2003, and included in an art kit by the same name. Liflander also details the life of Edgar Leeteg, "the father of American black velvet kitsch", whose "raucous and bawdy" life was previously captured by James Michener in Rascals in Paradise (1957).

At the restaurant chain Raising Cane's, a hand-painted Velvet Elvis is a common decorative feature to every restaurant—a tradition which started when founder Todd Graves covered a hole in the wall at the first Raising Cane's with an Elvis portrait.

Velvet was a popular medium for artists on the streets of Tijuana, reaching a height of popularity in the 1970s.
