= 2006 Tonga earthquake =

Earthquake in Tonga

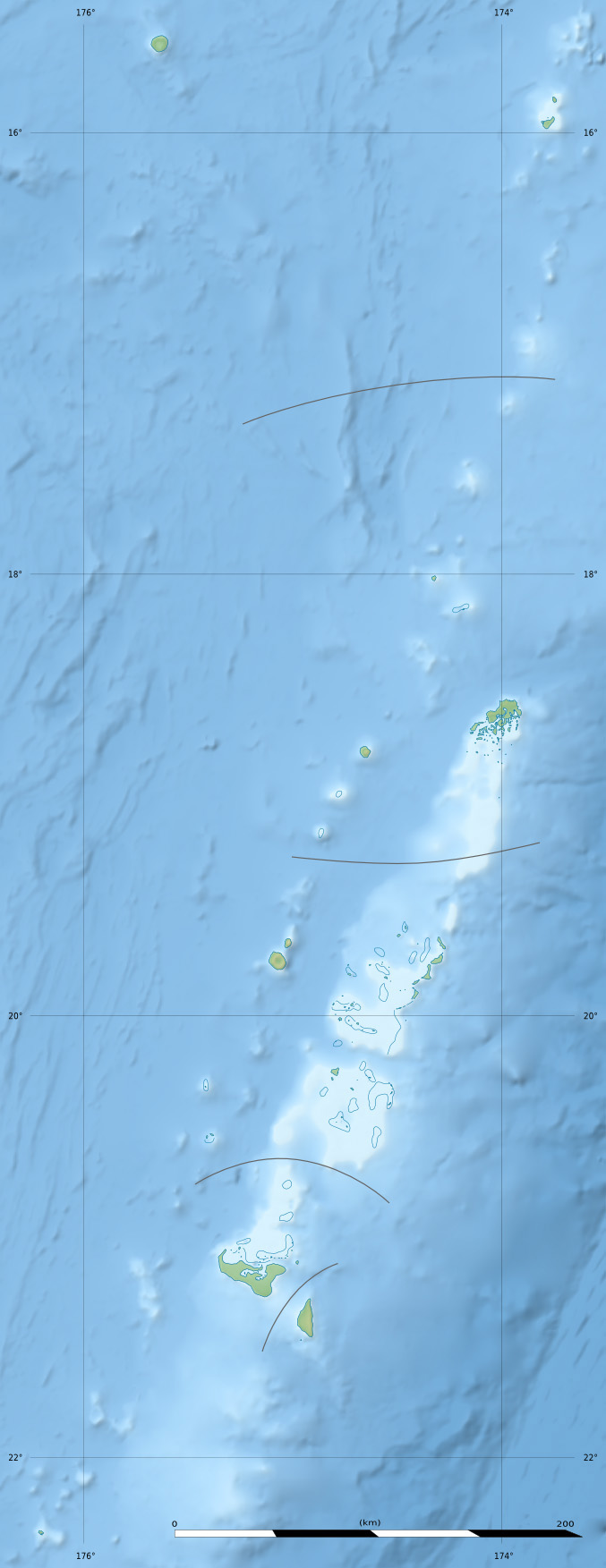
- Location within Oceania Location within Tonga
- UTC time: 2006-05-03 15:26:40
- ISC event: 10698255
- USGS-ANSS: ComCat
- Local date: May 4, 2006
- Local time: 04:26:35
- Magnitude: 8.0 M_{w}
- Depth: 40.9 km (25 mi)
- Epicenter: 19.97°S 174.27°W
- Type: Reverse
- Max. intensity: MMI VII (Very strong)
- Tsunami: 0.54 m (1 ft 9 in)
- Casualties: 1 injured

The 2006 Tonga earthquake occurred on 4 May at 04:26:35 local time with a moment magnitude of 8.0 and a maximum Mercalli intensity of VII (very strong). One injury occurred and a non-destructive tsunami was observed.

== Earthquake ==
The National Oceanic and Atmospheric Administration's Pacific Tsunami Warning Center in Hawaii issued a warning 17 minutes after the earthquake for coastal areas around the Pacific. An hour later, the center downgraded the warning to only the region within 600 miles of the epicenter, and an hour after that, it canceled the alert. The earthquake was followed by a pair of large aftershocks the next day.

== Damage ==
The event caused very limited damage. The previous large earthquake in Tonga, in 1977, was of a lower magnitude but resulted in more severe damage. A likely cause is that the 2006 quake generated other frequencies that only resulted in resonance in small items. In shops, cans and bottles fell from shelves.

- The century-old Catholic church in Lapaha had new cracks in the tower and several stones fell down, leaving the steeple in a somewhat unstable position.
- The tower of a 60-year-old church of the Free church of Tonga in Veitongo collapsed, the steeple came down and several walls cracked beyond repair.
- A Korean business man jumped in panic from his second floor hotel room and was hurt in the fall. He was brought to the hospital where he had to wait a long time for any help as power was off and most staff were off duty (as that day was a public holiday).
- The American wharf in Nukuʻalofa sustained cracks in addition to those caused by the 1977 earthquake.
- A ship, sunk in 1949 near Toula, Vavaʻu apparently burst open and its load of copra came floating to the ocean surface.
- A landslide occurred at Hunga island in Vavaʻu, when the ground at a steep cliff along the shore began sliding into the sea.
- In Haʻapai, the islands closest to the epicentre, the wharf was damaged and a number of water-pipes and telephone lines were broken. Niuʻui hospital was damaged.

== Tsunami ==
Since the earthquake occurred underwater, tsunami warnings were issued, but then lifted. A small tsunami was observed. Later analysis showed the earthquake to be a slab-tearing event and so less conducive to tsunami generation.

== See also ==
- List of earthquakes in 2006
- List of earthquakes in Tonga
