= Fatafehi =

Fatafehi is a name. Notable people with the name include:

- Fatafehi ʻAlaivahamamaʻo Tukuʻaho (1954–2004), Tongan Prince
- Fatafehi Fakafanua (born 1985), Tongan politician
- Fatafehi Fuatakifolaha (1944–2017), Tongan noble
- Fatafehi ʻo Lapaha (1735–1825), 10th Tu'i Tonga Fefine
- Fatafehi Tuʻipelehake (1922–1999), prime minister of Tonga
- Alipate Fatafehi (born 1984), Tongan rugby union player
- Mario Fatafehi (born 1979), American football player
- Nikotimasi Fatafehi Laufilitonga Kakau Vahaʻi (born 1971), Tongan noble
- Tēvita Fatafehi Puloka, Tongan politician
