= Pigeon snaring =

Sport played exclusively by Samoan and Tongan nobility

Pigeon netting was a sport played by Tongan and Samoan aristocracy atop natural or human-made platforms called tia seu lupe in Samoa and sia heu lupe in Tonga (with the identical translation as "pigeon hunting platform/mound" in both languages). By the 1700s, when Europeans began visiting Tonga and recording their observations, the sport was no longer played regularly. By the early 1800s, it was not played at all. While the ritualized sport was largely unknown in Tonga at the start of the 19th century, the practice persisted in some places in Samoa until the 1930s. Some have referred to the sport as "pigeon snaring" though this is a misnomer as no trapping devices or actual snares were used in this particular hunting method.

== Pigeon Hunting in Samoa ==
Because pigeon netting was continuously practiced in Samoa into the first half of the 20th century, much is known about its technical practice, ritual protocols, and specialized terminology based on eyewitness accounts, photographs of decoy pigeons, and actual sporting equipment that still exists including examples of pigeon nets (ʻupega seuga), hunting stools (nofoaga seuga), and carved perches (tūlalupe).

In Sāmoa, the sport centered on an elevated platform called tia seu lupe, which were either naturally formed hills or humanmade stone mounds, located deep in forested interior or highlands where wild pigeons nested. All brush and foliage was cleared from the upper elevation of the mound and the soil was swept to form a circular surface called the ofo ("meeting place") or fogātia ("platform surface"). In the case of stone-built tia, steps (ape) or ramps (alasopo) were built of stacked stone to provide hunters access to the elevated platform. Established tia were maintained by successive generations and were typically named and considered sacred/exclusive sites (vā tapuia).

Up to four noblemen competed in each round, each vying to be the first to catch a predetermined number of pigeons. Hunting blinds called faleseu ("hunting house") or falelafi ("concealed house") were erected along the perimeter of the tia. These shelters were made with a basic framework of branches and thick vines covered with leaves and ferns, except for an open space above the hunter's head which allowed full range of vision into the rainforest canopy above. Since silence (fīlēmū) and stillness (liligo) were required onsite at the tia, materials to build the faleseu were felled, shaped, and collected some distance away from the hunting site and transported by untitled men to the tia where they were quietly and deliberately erected to avoid the sounds of chopping wood, breaking branches, or accidentally dropping stone tools or wooden poles, etc The spatial arrangement of the hunting blinds followed the traditional alofi ("meeting circle") layout, with the huts occupied by the highest ranking participants set opposite each other in the positions called matuatala or tala; these huts were called the falemua ("foremost/principal house") and the falematua ("senior/parent house"). Located peripherally to the higher ranking huts, the other blinds were called the falelele ("flying house") and falepālalau ("foliage covered house"). The highest ranking competitor was called tauvao and it was his prerogative to choose the location of the falemua, which then established the relative positioning of the other three blinds.

Samoan chiefs prided themselves in the training and attentive care of decoy pigeons, called manufanua (in contrast to wild pigeons, manuvao), who were pampered and doted on. A thin fausoga fiber cord was attached to the leg of a decoy pigeon with a basic slipknot and the other end was coiled around the hunter's palm and/or wrist. Decoys were trained to fly up into the air above the tia in order to attract wild pigeons within range of the hunters' long-handled nets. A well-trained decoy could be taught to change direction, speed, and altitude mid-flight by responding to the commands of the hunter conveyed through pulling, jerking, and slackening of the tether string.

Pigeon hunting nets called upega seuga ("hunting net") or upega lupe ("pigeon net") were artfully crafted from a long wooden handle (na'a) with a carved distal fork (magana'a) to which dowels (a'au) were lashed to form the oval-shaped mouth (gutu) frame to which the fine meshed net (puta) was attached. The pigeon nets observed by Te Rangi Hiroa (one of which is in the collection of the Bishop Museum) were 15 feet in total length, while other colonial-era observers made note of pigeon nets with bamboo handles up to 30 or 40 feet long. These nets were fashioned by the same master netmakers who made fishing nets; chiefs rendered payment in fine mats and other valuable goods termed tauʻupega; similar protocols and restrictions (faʻasā, tapu) that applied to rituals like Peʻa, making lega (turmeric pigment) or lama (candlenut dye), etc. were followed while a pigeon net was commissioned by a chief in order to ensure that only good intention and successful thoughts were willed into the crafting of the net.

Once a hunter was situated in his faleseu, the proximal end of the handle was rested within arms-reach and the distal net rested in the middle of the tia. Stationary decoys were tethered to wooden perches (tūlalupe) that were inserted into the ground around the shelters to further entice the approach of curious (and territorial) wild pigeons. Camouflaged in woven taumata visors (that hid the glint of the hunters' eyes) and ferns and leaves that hid the shine of sweaty heads and torsos, the hunters hunkered under their shelters sitting on three-legged wooden stools called nofoaga seuga ("hunting seat"), which allowed them to rise quickly to swing their net when they had lured a wild pigeon within range.

Extensive vocabulary -- including honorific terms, poetic proverbs, and technical jargon describing netting maneuvers, decoy handling, and pigeon behavior and anatomy -- accompanied pigeon hunting in Sāmoa, many of which are still in common usage today, decades after pigeon netting has faded into obscurity.

== Pigeon Hunting in Tonga ==
Unlike the detailed knowledge of pigeon hunting in Sāmoa, information regarding pigeon netting in Tonga is scarce. All that is known about the extinct sport comes from one written eye-witness account, one engraving, oral tradition and archaeology. William Mariner, an Englishman who lived in Tonga between 1806 and 1810 described:

"Jia Loobe [sia lupe], catching pigeons with a net. This is not a very usual sport at present, though formerly it used to be. The net used for the purpose is small, with a narrow opening, affixed to the end of a rod of about twelve feet in length. The sportsman who holds it is concealed in a small cabin about five feet high, nearly in form of a bee-hive, in which there is a perpendicular slit dividing it quite in half, by which he can move his rod completely from side to side. There are eight or nine of these cabins, in each of which perhaps, there is a sportsman with his net. The only mode of entrance is by separating the two halves of the cabin from each other. These receptacles are usually situated round the upper part of a raised mount. On the outside of each there is a trained pigeon tied by the leg, and near at hand stands an attendant with another trained bird, tied in like manner to the end of a very long line, which is suffered to fly out to the whole extent of the string, the other end being held by the man. The pigeon thus describes a considerable circle in the air round the mount beneath. The flight of this bird, and the constant cooing of those below, attract a number of wild pigeons to the neighbourhood, when the man by checking the string calls in his pigeon, which immediately perches upon his finger. He then conceals himself with the other attendants in a sort of alcove at the top of the mount. The wild pigeons now approaching the tame ones, are caught in the nets by the dexterous management of the sportsmen."

A 1793 engraving by the French captain, D’Entrecasteaux may corroborate Mariner's story.

== Tongan Pigeon Hunting Mounds ==
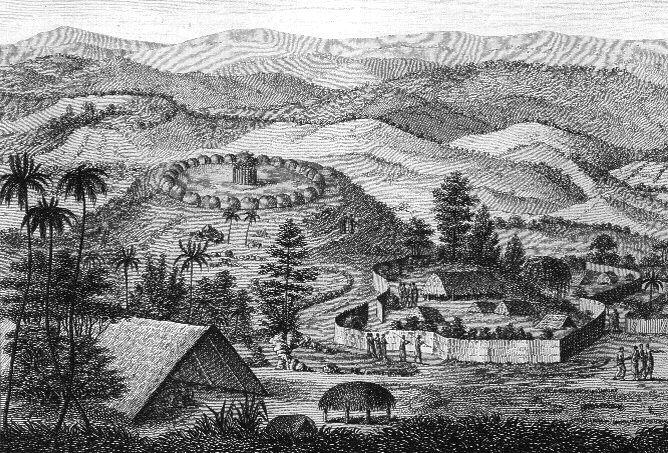
Pigeon snaring mound in Tongatapu

In Tongan, pigeon hunting platforms are called sia heu lupe. The appearance of these mounds in Tonga began in the twelfth century but their construction in association with pigeon hunting experienced a gradual decline. The general shape of these mounds was described as “more or less circular platforms, 20-35 m wide and 0.6-5 m high, with a flat top. The characteristic feature of the Tongan pigeon mound is a circular central pit, 5—7 m in diameter, which has stone-faced walls. Some pigeon mounds in addition have large stone-lined pits filled with large boulders. The function of these structures is unknown.” The central depression puzzles archaeologists because it is not described in William Mariner's account and no one knows how it was used to capture pigeons. There are also many mounds, especially in Ha’apai, that do not have the depression.

While sia heu lupe can be found throughout Tonga, the best studied are those in the Ha’apai Island Group, where many were constructed in the fifteenth and sixteenth centuries by the Mata’uvave line of chiefs. A 1990-1992 archaeological survey of northern Ha’apai by Simon Fraser University identified two on Nukunamo island, one on the northern tip of Foa Island, none on Lifuka Island, eight on U’oleva Island, one on Tatafa Island and none on ‘Uiha Island. One of these mounds, called Sialufotu on U’oleva island, is known as the personal mound the Mata’uvave and is the largest known sia heu lupe in Tonga.

The Simon Fraser study classified mounds into one of three types: mounds with central depression lacking stacked-stone retaining walls, complex mounds with stone retaining walls and access ramps, and flat-topped mounds. As pigeon mounds were created not only for the sport but to project status, the second type would exalt the highest status of the three as it required the highest investment of labour.

The Simon Fraser study also found several characteristics of pigeon mounds. "First, they were situated in areas without a large, if any, human population and this would have facilitated an expansive cover of forest growth to which pigeons would be attracted… Second, the mounds were constructed in protected areas that, while within the proximity to the shore, tended toward the center line of the island upon which they were built… this pattern conforms to the expected flight path of a migrating pigeon flock as it might be pursued by hunters."

== Cultural Significance in Tonga ==
Constructing pigeon hunting mounds required substantial investments of labour from many people, but the sport was tabu, or forbidden, to all but the Tongan chiefs. Any pigeons captured by commoners were to be given to chiefs, and anyone caught eating a pigeon could be punished by "whipping or even death".

The sport could be played for rather basic, small mounds, so the variety in size ornamentation of the mounds is attributed to their projection of status for the chiefs who commissioned their construction. According to one historian, "pigeon mounds, together with the royal tombs (langi), can be considered as the highest ranking sites in Tonga." The larger one's mound, the higher one's status.
