= Maʻafu =

Maʻafu or Ma'afu is a name commonly found in people from Oceania. It can be a masculine given name or a surname.

Notable people with this name include:

== As a given name ==
- Enele Maʻafu (c. 1816–1881), Tongan prince and Fijian chief
- Maʻafu Fia (born 1986), Tongan rugby union football player
- Maʻafu Tukuiʻaulahi (1955–2021), Tongan politician and nobleman
- Maʻafu-ʻo-limuloa (died 1799), Tongan chief

== As a surname ==
- Lorenzo Ma'afu (born 1987), New Zealand rugby league footballer
- Salesi Ma'afu (born 1983), Australian rugby union footballer
- Viliami Maʻafu (born 1982), Tongan rugby union footballer
