= John Martin (meteorologist) =

British meteorologist and physician

John Martin M.D. (1789–1869) was a British meteorologist and physician, known now for his writing on Tonga.

== Life ==
Martin practised for some years as a physician in the City of London.

In November 1825 Martin began a period of six months in the Fleet Prison, for debt. He had support from the publisher John Murray, who applied on his behalf to the Literary Fund Society. He then returned to Portugal, where he had business interests. He died at Lisbon on 8 July 1869.

== Works ==
The Athenæum reported on Martin's meteorological investigations. For pressure, temperature, and moisture, he made meteorological charts from daily observations. He noted ozone, as well as factors thought to affect cholera and yellow fever.

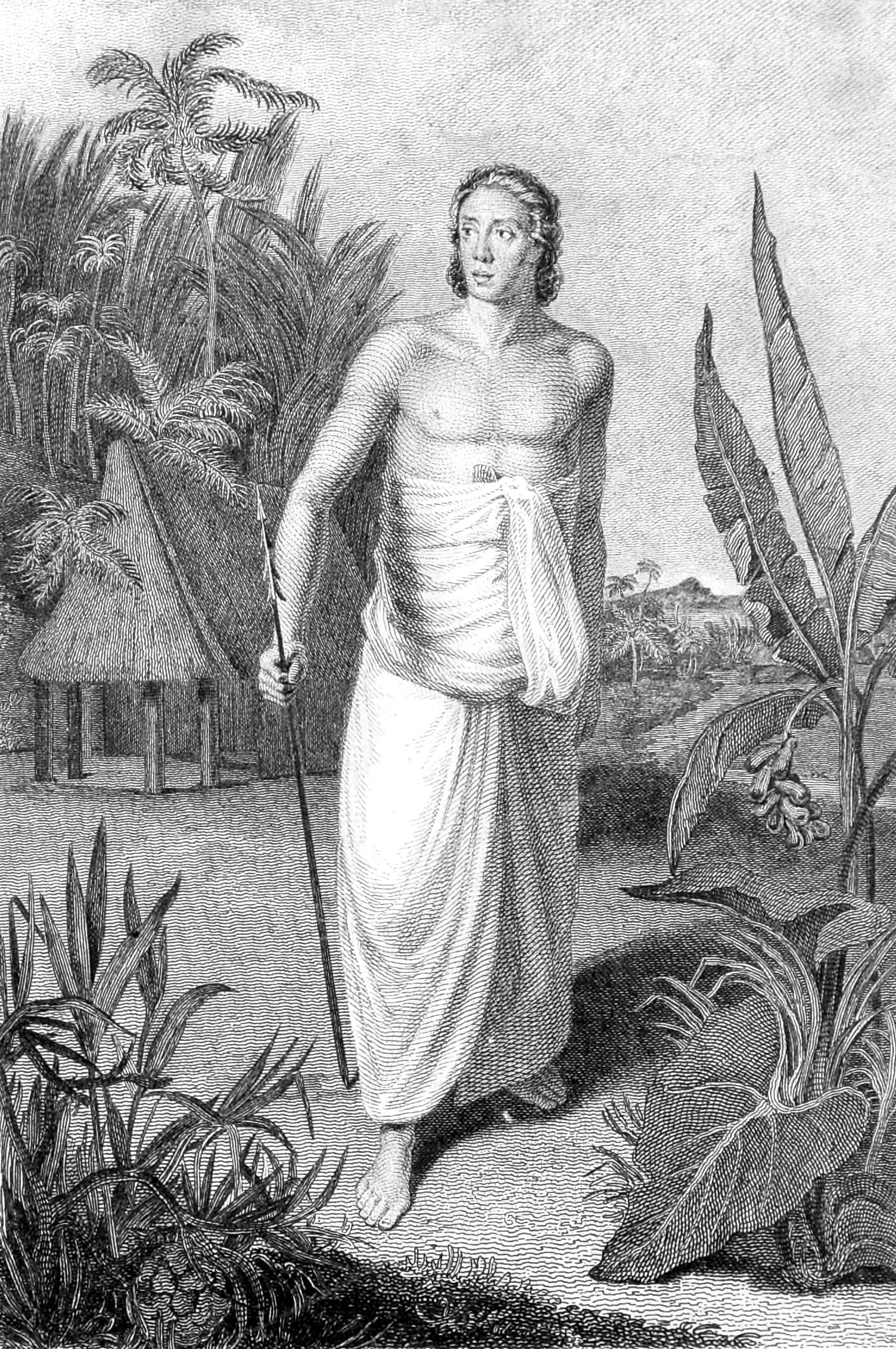
Illustration from 'An Account of the Natives of the Tonga Islands showing William Mariner

Martin edited an account of Tonga from William Mariner, who had arrived on Tonga on the Port au Prince, serving as captain's clerk, and was held captive. It appeared as An Account of the Natives of the Tonga Islands, in the South Pacific Ocean, with an original Grammar and Vocabulary of their Language. Compiled and arranged from the extensive communications of Mr. William Mariner, several years resident in those Islands,' 2 vols. London, 1817; 2nd edit. 1818. It was also reprinted as vol. xiii. of Constable's Miscellany. Mariner had been detained in Tonga from 1806 to 1810. Over the next few years there was an American edition published at Boston, and translations appeared in French and German.

A third, revised edition appeared in 1827. In it, Martin omitted comparisons with an account of Hawaii by Archibald Campbell in A Voyage Round the World, from 1806 to 1812.
