= Tupoumoheofo =

12th Tu'i Kanokupolu of Tonga

Tupoumoheofo was 12th Tu'i Kanokupolu of Tonga, and the only female to ever hold that title. She was the principal wife to the Tu'i Tonga though she may have been of higher social rank than him because of her matrilineal descent. After a vacancy in the Tu'i Kanokupolu title, she used her status to designate herself successor, reigning on Tongatapu for slightly less than one year starting in perhaps 1792 before being forcibly deposed by her distant relative Tuku’aho. Tupoumoheofo retreated to retirement in the northern Tongan Island of Vava’u under the protection of the 'Ulukalala family.

== Family and social rank ==
In the late 18th century, Tupoumoheofo may have been the highest-ranking person in Tonga due to her matrilineal descent. Her “mother’s mother was Tamahā, the sacred eldest daughter of the Tu’i Tonga’s eldest sister, and thus the person holding the highest rank in Tonga(van der Grijp 538)”. She also earned high status through her patrilineal descent as her father was Tupoulahi, the 7th Kanokupolu.

Tupoumoheofo was a sister of Tu’ihalafatai, the 9th Tu’i Kanokupolu.

In the late 1760s, Tupoumoheofo married Tu’i Tonga Paulaho, the 36th Tu'i Tonga, as principal wife (the moheofo), whom she is often considered to have helped in assassinating in 1791.

With her husband Paulaho, Tupoumoheofo had several daughters, including Fatafehi ʻo Lapaha. Fuanunuiava, the future 38th Tu’i Tonga, is often said also to be a son of this marriage and that obtaining him his future title was one of Tupoumoheofo’s main goals. A genealogy collected by Neil Gunson suggests, however, that Fuanunuiava was not Tupoumoheofo’s son but instead Paulaho’s son from his secondary wife, Fokonofo (202 herda) and therefore Tupoumoheofo would have little reason to push him into power.

== The death of her husband ==
There is some disagreement over when Paulaho was murdered – whether it was 1784 or a decade later. He most likely died in 1791 or 1792, just before Tupoumoheofo claimed the title of Tu’i Kanokupolu. In an interview by a Spanish sailor years later, Tupoumoheofo claimed to have been a leading participant in an alliance of the Tu’i Kanokupolu lineage that, “set out from Tonga with some 20 large canoes, putting into the ports of Annamoka [Nomuka] and Happai [Ha’apai]. They passed to Vavao [Vava’u] where Paulajo [Paulaho], as the head of his people, received them. There was a clash which ended with the death of the latter at the hands of Vuna, after these two leaders fought hand to hand…” This put her in alliance with Mumui, who, though later her challenger, was a relative of the Tu’i Kanokupolu line. The result was to completely debase the power of the Tu’i Tonga line and elevate the Tu’i Kanokupolu line.

== Ascension to Tu'i Kanokupolu ==
Around 1791, the 11th Tu'i Kanokupolu, Mulikiha’ame’a, gave up his title rather quickly after attaining it. Some surmise that either he lost influence, he obtained a different title, that Mumui and Tuku’aho forced him out, or that Tupoumoheofo herself instigated the change. Though the next Tu'i Kanokupolu would be officially voted on by the Ha’a Ngata chiefs, ancestral protectors of the Tu'i Kanokupolu line in Hihifo, Tongatapu, the decision was really Tupoumoheofo’s because of her rank.

Mumui, a powerful elder chief on Tongatapu, expected to receive the title. He shared ancestry with Tupoumoheofo through Ma’afu’out’itonga, the sixth Tu'i Kanokupolu, but his was of a lesser line. Tuku’aho, Mumui’s politically ambitious son and then governor of ‘Eua, strongly supported his father’s claim with hopes of securing power for their line.

Tupoumoheofo, however, did the unexpected by naming herself as Tu'i Kanokupolu. She, “went to Hihifo, put a ta’ovala mat about her waist, and sat with her back to the koka tree beneath which the installation of the Tu’i Kanokupolu took place. Then she came back and declared herself Tu’i Kanokupolu.”

This appropriateness of ascension is controversial among historians. Early European missionaries in Tonga labeled her act as, “subversive”, “tyrannical”, “odious in the extreme” and an anthropologist has considered it “unrightful" More recent scholarship has suggested that her action was not actually without historical precedent and was “positively in line with her traditional position and rank.” Tupoumoheofo did have the immediate support of many chiefs.

== War with Tuku’aho ==
Incensed by Tupoumoheofo taking the title of Tu’i Kanokupolu instead of giving it to his own father, Mumui, Tuku’aho denounced Tupoumoheofo and seized some of her estates. She refused to step down, reminding him that he was of a lower rank than she was. She threatened his life if he continued his insubordination. In 1793 he invaded Tongatapu with an army and defeated her, though the Tongatapu chiefs guaranteed her safety because, “she was the daughter of a Tamahā” and allowed her into exile in Vava’u.

Tupoumoheofo soon raised a new army and attacked Tongatapu but was again unsuccessful. “This time she was pursued to Ha’apai, where her army was trapped on the island of Ha’ano [sic] and slaughtered. Its bones were still easily visible in great number half a century later.” As victor in the brief war, Tuku’aho appointed his father Tu’i Kanokupolu.

Tupoumoheofo spent the remainder of her days in Vava’u under the safety of the 'Ulukalala family, which was at odds with Tuku’aho and Mumui. It was Finau 'Ulukalala II and his relative Tupouniua who assassinated Tuku’aho in 1799. William Mariner, a British sailor taken in by Finau 'Ulukalala from 1806 to 1810, writes that the assassination was done at the insistence of Tupoumoheofo to avenge her earlier defeat.

== Legacy and sources ==
Most of the primary sources about Tupoumoheofo come from Europeans who often had conflicting accounts, descriptions, timelines, and biases. The lack of consensus makes her a controversial figure. Many of these historians were guests of Tupoumoheofo's enemies who eventually gained power and defeated her; the descendants of these enemies are Tonga's current royal family. These sources tend to view her negatively as an egregious usurper of power. She is also often accused of using her power to install her supposed son Fuanunuiava as Tu'i Tonga. Recent scholarship, however, claims that her actions were within historical precedent and acceptable to her social rank. There is also some evidence that Fuanunuiava was not actually her son.

There is agreement that at the close of the 18th century the old order that divided responsibilities between the Tu’i Tonga, Tu'i Ha'atakalaua and Tu'i Kanokupolu chiefly lines dissolved, and that the Tu’i Kanokupolu line (controlled by the Tupou family) eclipsed the others. Tupoumoheofo’s actions, and those of her immediate successors, are best understood as an attempt to consolidate power during this chaotic time.
