= Maʻafu-ʻo-limuloa =

Maʻafu-ʻo-limuloa (born sometime in the 18th century, died July(?) October(?) 1799) was the 15th Tuʻi Kanokupolu (chief of the House of Tupou in Oceanic kingdom of Tonga).

He was a grandson of Mailelaumotomoto, the 2nd Maʻafu-ʻo-Tukuʻiʻaulahi, the hereditary chief of the Vainī on Tongatapu, and a member of the Tongan reigning house of Tupou. He was proclaimed somewhere in June 1799 by the Haʻa Havea clan, a junior branch of the Tuʻi Kanokupolu line.

Maʻafuʻolimuloa was killed one day after his reign began, by the Haʻa Ngata Tupu (a senior clan), who did not agree with the Haʻa Havea. It was many years before the chiefs agreed upon the successor: a distant cousin of his, Tupoumālohi, and then only to forestall ambitions of a candidate even less acceptable to them.

The exact dates of his installation and murder are not known. For sure it was not 21 April, the sometimes quoted date, the day that his predecessor was murdered, as contending chiefs erupted in fighting for at least one or two months after Tukuʻaho's dead. It was after one of them, Mulikihaʻamea, fell on 29 May 1799. Some historians claim even as late as the next ʻinasi festival during 1800.

Preceded by Tukuʻaho	Tuʻi Kanokupolu; 1799	Succeeded by Tupoumālohi
