= ʻUlukalala =

ʻUlukalala may refer to:

- Tupoutoʻa ʻUlukalala (born 1985), crown prince of Tonga
- Fīnau ʻUlukālala, dynasty in Tonga
