= Tupoumālohi =

Tongan chief

Tupoumālohi (born sometime in the 18th century, died 1812) was the 16th Tuʻi Kanokupolu of Tonga from the death of his uncle Maʻafuʻolimuloa, the 15th Tuʻi Kanokupolu on 22 April 1799, until his own death in 1812.

According to: His installation took place on May 29, 1799 at the Pangai Green in Kolovai in Hihifo (Tongatapu). He established his capital at Nukuʻalofa, the current Tongan capital. He died on Haʻapai in 1812.

According to more established scholars: Exact date of installation unknown, probably somewhere around 1808 in Muʻa. Left office within the year. Defended without success a great fort in Nukuʻalofa against Fīnau ʻUlukālala II in 1807. (Nukuʻalofa in that time was a small settlement, it would not be made capital of Tonga until 1851 by Tāufaʻāhau, but it was already the residence of the Tuʻi Kanokupolu chiefs since Mumui around 1795).

Preceded by Maʻafuʻolimuloa	Tuʻi Kanokupolu; 1799–1812	Succeeded by Tupoutoʻa

== References and notes ==
- I.C. Campbell; Classical Tongan kingship; 1989
- E. Bott; Tonga society at the time of Captain Cook's visit; 1982
- S. Lātūkefu; Church and State in Tonga; 1974
