= Minerva (1805 whaler) =

History

France
- Name: Minerve
- Builder: Bordeaux
- Commissioned: 1800
- Captured: 1805

United Kingdom
- Name: Minerva
- Owner: Charles, Samuel & George Enderby
- Acquired: 1805 by purchase of a prize
- Fate: Crew mutinied; taken 1805

General characteristics
- Tons burthen: 322,(French; of load), or 324, (bm)
- Complement: French armed merchantman:85; At capture:111; Whaler:30
- Armament: Privateer:18 × 18-pounder guns; At capture:14 × 9-pounder guns; Whaler:10 × 9-pounder guns

Minerva was the French letter of marque Minerve, a former privateer from Bordeaux, that the Royal Navy captured in September 1804. Samuel Enderby & Sons purchased her c.1805 for use as a whaler. She was taken off the coast of Peru circa August 1805 after a crewman had killed her captain and her crew had mutinied.

== Origins and capture ==
Minerve appears to have been a privateer from Bordeaux. Her first cruise took place in 1800 under Captain Eugène Langlois.

On 31 March 1800, Minerve captured the United States letter of marque Minerva after a single ship action. Minerve was armed with eighteen 12 and 9-pounder guns, and had a crew of 155 men. Minerva, of 317 tons (bm), was armed with 14 guns, and had a crew of 30 men under Captain Wilkes Barber. Minerva had one man mortally wounded and one seriously wounded before Barber struck. Langlois put a prize crew of 21 men aboard Minerva, and took off most of her crew and two passengers; four crew and the other nine passengers (including four women and two children), remained on Minerva. Minerve and Minerva and sailed for Bordeaux. On 3 April a British frigate approached. She recaptured Minerva, but Minerve escaped by throwing gun, spare spars, and water casks overboard, and reached Bordeaux. The British figure turned out to be HMS Fisgard.

In early July HMS Amazon recaptured Amelia, late Donaldson, master, which the French privateer Minerve had captured. Amelia had been on her way from Savannah to London when she was captured. Amazon sent Amelia into Plymouth. HMS Glenmore recaptured William, LeQuesne, master, which had been sailing from the West Indies to Guernsey when Minerve captured her. William arrived at Cork.

On 3 July HMS Sirius recaptured the brig Cultivator. Indefatigable and Boadicea were in company at the time of the capture. Cultivator, Smith, master, had been sailing from Demerara to London when Minerve, of Bordeaux, had captured her.

In 1804 Minerve was serving as an armed merchantman with an 85-man crew. On 25 September HMS Topaze encountered and captured the French letter of marque ship Minerve, of Bordeaux, which was sailing to Martinique. She was pierced for 18 guns, but carried only fourteen 9-pounders, and had a crew of 111 men. Topaze captured Minerve at 49°30′N 15°30′W after a chase of 12 hours and took her into Cork on 3 October.

== Whaler ==
Samuel Enderby & Sons acquired Minerve for use as a whaler.

Captain Obed (or Obediah) Cottle acquired a letter of marque on 3 May 1805. He sailed Minerva from London on 25 May 1805, bound for Peru.

Lloyd's List (LL) reported on 25 May 1806 that the crew of Minerva, Cottle, master, had killed Cottle and taken the vessel. A second report, a month later, stated that Minerva had been taken near Lima. The crew had already put the first and second mates in a boat. Seven days later Maria, [David] Coffin, master, had rescued the two. Maria took them to New Bedford, Massachusetts, where she arrived in April, or on 9 May.

The mutiny took place around the middle of August 1805. The mutineers also put into two boats ten of the crew who refused to join the mutiny. After 10 days at sea, one of the boats, with four men on board, reached land. Two weeks after the mutiny Port au Prince rescued the men in the other boat.

It is not clear whether Minerva was wrecked or captured, and if captured, by whom.

The Register of Shipping (RS) for 1806 showed Minerva with O. Cotle, master, Enderby, owner, and trade London–Southern Fishery. The entry for her carried the annotation "LOST".
