= Velvet painting =

Painting using velvet as the support

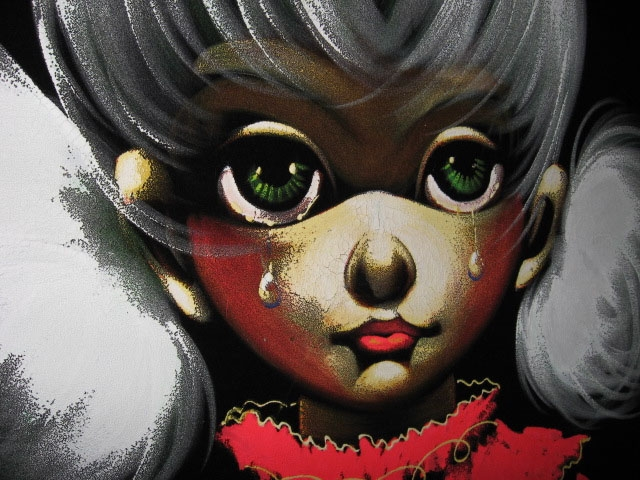
A black velvet painting

A velvet painting is a type of painting distinguished by the use of velvet (usually black velvet) as the support, in place of canvas, paper, or similar materials. The velvet provides an especially dark background against which colors stand out.

Velvet painting is an ancient technique, and took on a new popularity in the United States in the late 20th century.

== Early history ==
Black velvet paintings originated in Kashmir, the homeland of the fabric. These original paintings were generally religious and portrayed the icons of the Caucasus region which were painted by Russian Orthodox priests. Marco Polo and others introduced black velvet paintings to Western Europe, and some of these early works still hang in the Vatican Museums.

== Modern history ==
The paintings are widely sold in rural America, and frequently have kitsch themes. They often depict images of Elvis Presley (see Velvet Elvis), Dale Earnhardt, John Wayne, Jesus, Native Americans, Dogs Playing Poker, wolves, and cowboys, and the colors are often bright and vivid to contrast the dark velvet. They can also include more exotic or avant-garde themes.

Edgar Leeteg (1904–1953), often considered the father of American velvet painting, did his best works between 1933 and 1953.

Ciudad Juárez, Mexico was a center of velvet painting in the 1970s. A displaced Georgia farmboy, Doyle Harden, was the pioneer who created an enormous factory, where velvets were turned out by the thousands by artists sitting in studios. One artist would paint one piece of the picture, then slide the velvet along to the next artist, who would add something else. Velvet paintings mass-produced by hand in this manner fueled the boom in velvet paintings in the 1970s in the United States. Edgar Leeteg has been called "the father of American black velvet kitsch".

In Portland, Oregon, a museum devoted solely to velvet paintings, the Velveteria, operated from late 2005 to January 2010. It reopened in December 2013 in the Chinatown neighborhood of Los Angeles, but it was permanently closed c. 2020-2021 during the COVID-19 pandemic.

== See also ==
- Birodo yuzen
