= Tania Laumanulupe ʻo Talafolika Tupou =

Tongan diplomat

Tania Laumanulupe ʻo Talafolika Tupou, Lady Fusitu’a

Honorary Consul of the Kingdom of Tonga to the Kingdom of the Netherlands
- Incumbent
- Assumed office 15 March 2024
- Monarch: Tupou VI
- Prime Minister: Siaosi Sovaleni; Samiu Vaipulu ʻAisake Eke

Ambassador of the Kingdom of Tonga to Japan
- In office 3 October 2012 – 2024

Personal details
- Born: Tonga

Tania Laumanulupe ʻo Talafolika Tupou, Lady Fusitu’a, is a Tongan diplomat. She has served as the first Resident Ambassador of the Kingdom of Tonga to Japan and as Honorary Consul of the Kingdom of Tonga to the Kingdom of the Netherlands.

== Career ==
Topou served as Consul in San Francisco from 1996-2004. She became Office Manager of the Joint Office for Commonwealth Permanent Missions to the United Nations, in New York City, in March 2005.

Tupou worked as the deputy private secretary to the King of Tonga, Tupou VI, from 2009 to 2012.

On 3 October 2012, Tupou was appointed to serve as the first Resident Ambassador of Tonga to Japan. She liaised with Japanese diplomats regarding the provision of aid to Tonga, including for the introduction of a water supply system and the instalment of solar panels, oral health programmes for children, building hospitals and knowledge sharing for geographical disaster management.

In December 2014, Tupou spoke at the "Women’s Leadership in Different Cultural Contexts: Learning from Women Ambassadors to Japan" International Symposium at Ochanomizu University, where she promoted initiatives to increase women in the fields of politics and decision making.

In 2015, Tupou discussed how the procurement of potable water and evacuation facilities is of utmost importance at the United Nations (UN) 2015 World Conference on Disaster Risk Reduction held in Sendai, Tōhoku, Japan.

In February 2016, Tupou was interviewed by Japanese student interns for the Association for Promotion of International Cooperation (APIC). In 2017, Tupou represented Tonga at the third triannual Pacific Islands Leaders Meeting (PALM) in Tokyo, Japan, and attended the "Tokyo Ambassadors Night" reception at the Sheraton Miyako Hotel in Tokyo.

In 2019, Tupou became Lord Chamberlain in Nuku'alofa.

On 15 March 2024, Tupou was appointed to serve as Honorary Consul to the Kingdom of the Netherlands.
