= Tupou =

Tupou is a common surname in Tonga. It may refer to:

- Anthony Tupou, Australian Rugby League player
- Bill Tupou, New Zealand Rugby League player
- Bowie Tupou, Australia boxer
- Daniel Tupou, Australian Rugby League player
- Fenuki Tupou, American football offensive lineman
- Josh Tupou, American football defensive lineman
- Tame Tupou, New Zealand rugby league footballer
- Tania Laumanulupe ʻo Talafolika Tupou, Tongan diplomat
- Tani Tupou, American football player
- Taniela Tupou, Australian Rugby Union player
- Will Tupou, New Zealand professional rugby footballer
- Willie Tupou, Australian rugby league footballer
- Several kings and queens of Tonga
  - George Tupou I
  - George Tupou II
  - Sālote Tupou III
  - Tāufaʻāhau Tupou IV
  - George Tupou V
  - ʻAhoʻeitu Tupou VI
