= List of earthquakes in Tonga =

This is a list of earthquakes in Tonga:

== Earthquakes ==
Date	Region	Coords	Mag.	MMI	Deaths	Injuries	Comments	
2025-03-30	Lifuka		7.0 M_{w}	IV	0	0		
2013-05-23	Vaini	23.009°S 177.232°W	7.4 M_{w}	VI				
2009-03-19		23.13°S 174.58°W	7.6 M_{w}	VII			Tsunami	
2006-05-04		19.97°S 174.27°W	8.0 M_{w}	VII		1	Tsunami	
1977-06-22		22.88°S 175.9°W	7.2 M_{s}	IV	1		$1.2 million in damage / tsunami	NGDC 1972
1919-04-30		18.35°S 172.52°W	8.1 M_{w}				Limited damage / tsunami	NGDC 1972
1865-11-18		19.5°S 173.5°W	8.0 M_{s}				Limited damage / tsunami	NGDC 1972
Note: The inclusion criteria for adding events are based on WikiProject Earthquakes' notability guideline that was developed for stand-alone articles. The principles described also apply to lists. In summary, only damaging, injurious, or deadly events should be recorded.
