= Rascals in Paradise (short story collection) =

- First edition (publ. Random House)
- Author: James A. Michener
- Language: English
- Publication date: 1957

Rascals in Paradise is a 1957 collection of ten nonfiction short stories co-written by James A. Michener (1907-1997) and University of Hawaii professor Arthur Grove Day (1904-1994). The collection comprises ten historical adventure stories about historical people and events in the Pacific islands.

== Contents ==
1. Rascals in Paradise: The Globe Mutineers
2. Charles I, Emperor of Oceania
3. Coxinga, Lord of the Seas
4. Gibson, the King's Evil Angel
5. Bligh, Man of Mutinies
6. Doña Isabel, the Lady Explorer
7. Bully Hayes, South Sea Buccaneer
8. Louis Becke, Adventurer and Writer
9. Will Mariner, the boy Chief of Tonga
10.Leeteg, the Legend
