= Fatafehi ʻo Lapaha =

Fatafehi 'o Lapaha (1735–1825) was the 10th Tu'i Tonga Fefine (Female Sacred King) and was the daughter of Paulaho, the 36th Tu'i Tonga (Sacred King of Tonga). Her mother was Paulaho's Moheofo (Principal wife) Tupoumoheofo, who laid claimed to the Tu'i Kanokupolu and is recognised as the 12th Tu'i Kanokupolu.

Fatafehi 'o Lapaha's father, Paulaho was the Sacred King when Captain James Cook visited in 1777. Her siblings were Sinaitaka'ifekitetele, Fatafehiha'apai, Manutauhakau, and Fuanunu'iava.

Fatafehi 'o Lapaha married Tu'i Ha'ateiho Fa'otusia Fakahiku'o'uiha of the Falefisi Clan (House of Fiji). The chiefs of the House of Fiji were the only Tongan chiefs allowed to marry the Tu'i Tonga Fefine. Their son, Makamalaohi, was known as the Tamatauhala, the only known person in Tongan History to achieve the highest social status in Tonga.

The Tamatauhala was the child of the Tu'i Tonga Fefine and the male Tamaha (son of a Female Sacred King).
