= Māʻitaki =

Tongan title for a royal consort

The māʻitaki (a word related to the Samoan tamataʻi (lady)) was a daughter of the Tuʻi Haʻatakalaua who married with the Tuʻi Tonga to become his principal wife and the mother of his heir. As personal rank in Tonga comes from the mother, this elevated the status of the future Tuʻi Tongas, and increased the power of the Tuʻi Haʻatakalauas, because of the fahu system. It was thus advantageous to both kāinga (families).

The first māʻitaki was Kaloafutonga around 1600, the last Longomāʻitaki around 1700.

The system lasted only for 4 generations, as by then the power of the Tuʻi Haʻatakalaua had been eclipsed by the Tuʻi Kanokupolu, and the Tuʻi Tonga started to take his principal wife from the latter kāinga. They were called moheofo (meaning: to wake up (a lord)). Originally, however, the term was to indicate a young woman sleeping with a visiting chief, as was normal in former times.

The first moheofo was Tongotea around 1700. It was a habit that they were brought at night to their new husbands. (Tongotea's older sister Halaevalu also married a Tuʻi Tonga, but this seems to have been more a try out, and she did not become mother of the next king).

As consequence nowadays the word māʻitaki has degenerated into a general term for concubine, while moheofo is a reference to the royal family. Quite opposite to their original meanings.
