= 1977 Tonga earthquake =

Natural disaster in Tonga

- Location within Oceania
- UTC time: 1977-06-22 12:08:33
- ISC event: 697569
- USGS-ANSS: ComCat
- Local date: 23 June 1977
- Local time: 01:08:33
- Magnitude: 8.0 M_{w}
- Depth: 55 km (34 mi)
- Epicenter: 22.89°S 175.71°W
- Type: Normal
- Max. intensity: MMI VIII (Severe)
- Casualties: yes

The 1977 Tonga earthquake took place on 23 June at 01:08:33 local time some 200 km southwest of Tongatapu, with shocks affecting all islands of the kingdom of Tonga. The earthquake measured 8.0 on the moment magnitude scale and had a maximum intensity of VIII (Severe) on the Mercalli intensity scale. The shaking lasted for three minutes. At the time it was considered the worst earthquake to have ever struck Tonga.

== Earthquake ==
The earthquake struck at 12:08:33 UTC with an epicentre approximately 240km south-southwest of Tongatapu, near the intersection of the Tonga trench and Louisville Ridge. It had the longest rupture duration ever reported for a normal fault event.

The earthquake was felt in Tahiti. It was followed by numerous aftershocks. The earthquake triggered a small tsunami, which was detected around the Pacific.

== Damage ==
The earthquake caused considerable damage to infrastructure, but no deaths. Most of the damage was in Tongatapu and ʻEua and the least damage in Ha'apai and Vava'u. 34 houses were destroyed in ʻEua. In Nukuʻalofa part of the prime minister's house collapsed, a wharf was split from the waterfront, warehouses sunk into the sea, and a church steeple collapsed. The main hospital at Vaiola was seriously damaged. Nukuʻalofa's water supply was disrupted for a few days, and the electricity cut off for a fortnight. The damge was estimated at over $1 million.

The New Zealand government provided relief assistance, including medical supplies, a C-130 Hercules, and a Ministry of Works engineering team.

== See also ==
- List of earthquakes in 1977
- List of earthquakes in Tonga
