= Port au Prince (1790 ship) =

Ship built in France in 1790

History

France
- Name: General Dumourier
- Launched: 1790
- Captured: 1793

Great Britain
- Name: Port au Prince
- Acquired: 1793 or early 1794 by purchase
- Fate: Captured and burned 29 November 1806

General characteristics
- Tons burthen: 446 (1790–1795), and 466 (1796–1805) (Note: The data from the issuance of letters of marque shows the change in burthen occurring in 1796. Lloyd's Register indicates that she underwent repairs at that time, leading one to conjecture that she may have undergone some small enlargement then, or simply have been measured more accurately. Lloyd's Register too notes a change in size, but not until the 1799 issue.) (bm)
- Complement: 1794: 20; 1796: 45; 1797: 40; 1800: 25; 1803: 45; 1805: 85
- Armament: 1794: 16 × 6-pounder guns; 1796: 20 × 9&12-pounder guns; 1797: 24 × 9&12-pounder guns; 1800: 20 × 9&12-pounder guns; 1803: 22 × 9&12-pounder guns; 1805: 28 × 6&9&12-pounder guns (Note: Some records suggest that her armament consisted of 24 long nine and 12-pounder guns as well as eight 12-pounder carronades on the quarterdeck.)

Port au Prince was built in France in 1790. The British Royal Navy captured her in 1793 off Port-au-Prince, Haiti. Her original name was General Dumourier; her new owners named her for her place of capture. She became a letter of marque, slave ship in the triangular trade in enslaved people, and privateer cum whaler. In 1806 she anchored at a Tongan island where the local inhabitants massacred most of her crew and then scuttled her.

== Career ==
On 11 April 1793, HMS Ganges was part of the squadron commanded by Admiral John Gell. The squadron captured two vessels, one from San Jago, and the privateer Général Dumourier.

Port au Prince first appeared in Lloyd's Register in 1794 with the notes that she was built in 1790, and was a French prize. Her captain's name was given as H. Hayne, her owner's name variously as Muilman, Mulement, or Muilmen, and her trade as Portsmouth – "SDom". This last is a little problematical as the trade remains unchanged through 1796, and France took complete control of San Domingo in 1795. Furthermore, war with France had begun already in 1793. In any case, Henry Hayne received a letter of marque for Port au Prince on 5 March 1794.

=== 1st voyage transporting enslaved people (1796–1797) ===
Ownership changed in 1796, at about the time she underwent repairs. Her new owners were Roger Leigh, John Parr Jr., and Thomas Parr, and her new captain William Corran (or Curran). He received a letter of marque dated 5 August 1796. Her trade changed to Liverpool – Africa, indicating that she had become a slave ship.

She sailed from Liverpool on 16 October 1796, bound for the Bight of Biafra and Gulf of Guinea islands to acquire and transport enslaved people. In 1796, 103 vessels sailed from English ports to acquire and transport enslaved people; 94 of these vessels sailed from Liverpool.

Port au Prince acquired captives at Bonny Island. On 27 April 1797, she arrived at Demerara. She arrived back at Liverpool on 29 September. Of her crew of 62 three died on the voyage. At some point on her voyage, Captain William Gibson replaced William Corran.

In 1797, Port au Prince's trade became London – Demerara. In 1799 and 1800 her trade was London – Martinique. For all three years her captain was George Hall, who had received a letter of marque for her on 25 November 1797.

R. Bent & Co. acquired Port au Prince in 1800. Robert Bent had previously owned the slave ship Ellis, which the French Navy had captured in 1793. Port au Prince's captain was Charles Kneal (or Kneale), who received a letter of marque on 7 June 1800. Her trade again became Liverpool—Africa.

=== 2nd voyage transporting enslaved people (1800–1801) ===
Kneale sailed from Liverpool on 7 July 1800, bound for Bight of Biafra. In 1800, 133 vessels sailed from English ports to acquire and transport enslaved people; 120 of these vessels sailed from Liverpool.

Port au Prince acquired captives at Bonny Island and Gulf of Guinea islands, and delivered them to Kingston, Jamaica. She arrived 12 February 1801 and landed 383 captives. She had sailed with a crew of 65 and had 50 men when she arrived at Kingston. Six men had died on the voyage. Port au Prince arrived back at Liverpool on 22 July.

=== 3rd voyage transporting enslaved people (1802) ===
The next year Captain William Blackie replaced Kneal. Because the Peace of Amiens had ended the French Revolutionary Wars, he did not apply for a letter of marque. He sailed Port au Prince on 28 March 1802, from London to West Central Africa and St Helena. In 1802, 155 vessels sailed from English ports to acquire and transport enslaved people; 30 of these vessels sailed from London.

Port au Prince acquired captives at Cabinda. She arrived at Saint Croix in the Danish West Indies on 21 October. There she landed 380 captives. At some point Captain James Hall replaced Blackie. She arrived back at London on 3 March 1802.

At the time Saint Croix was a Danish colony. In 1792, the Danish government passed a law that would outlaw Danish participation in the trans-Atlantic enslaving trade, from early 1803 on. This led the government in the Danish West Indies to encourage the importation of captives prior to the ban taking effect. One measure that it took was to open the trade to foreign vessels.

=== 4th voyage transporting enslaved people (1803–1804) ===
In 1803 Port au Prince's trade changed to London−Africa. The Napoleonic Wars had commenced and her new captain, Andrew Lawson, received a letter of marque on 25 July 1803. He sailed her to the Bight of Biafra and Gulf of Guinea islands, leaving London on 7 July 1803. In 1803, 99 vessels sailed from English ports to acquire and transport enslaved people; 15 of these vessels sailed from London.

Port au Prince acquired captives at Bonny, and delivered 389 captives to Kingston, Jamaica on 15 April 1804. She sailed from Kingston on 12 June and arrived back at London on 14 August.

=== Whaler ===
In 1805 Captain Isaac Duck replaced Lawson. Port au Prince's trade changed to London—South Seas, i.e. to whaling. Duck received a letter of marque on 21 January 1805. Bent's plans for her had changed, not just her trade. Her complement had about doubled to 85 men, compared with the 20–45 of previous years. Clearly, she was to serve as a privateer as she would be over-manned for a trader, slaver, or whaler, but would require extra men if she was successful in capturing enemy vessels that would need prize crews to bring them back to friendly ports.

== Last voyage ==
Robert Bent, of London, gave Port au Prince a twofold commission. The primary goal was to sail to the Pacific and capture treasure from the Spanish colonies on the west coast of South America, but if unsuccessful in that endeavour she should hunt whales. Under the command of Captain Isaac Duck, she weighed anchor at Gravesend on 12 February 1805 on what was destined to be her last voyage. One of the men aboard Port au Prince was William Mariner, who survived her loss and eventually wrote a detailed account of the journey, and of the Tongans amongst whom he lived after they captured him. Most of the information below comes from his journals.

Port au Prince was reported "all Well" round Cape Horn in June 1805. She apparently captured several small Spanish vessels in the South Pacific, and looted some coastal towns.

Circa end-August Port au Prince rescued ten men from the crew of Minerva. Some of the crew of Minerva had mutinied, shot the master, and put in boats the officers and crew who would not join the mutiny.

On 17 September Port au Prince was reported at Chinka (Peru), in company with the privateer Lucy, Captain Alexander Ferguson. Ferguson had received a letter of marque on 10 January 1805. Lucy was of 345 tons (bm), had a crew of 60 men, and was armed with eighteen 9 & 18-pounder guns. Lucy too belonged to Robert Bent, and he had instructed Duck that if they were able to meet up, Duck and Ferguson should cooperate in privateering.

On 4 October Lucy and Port au Prince gave chase to a vessel that Lucy captured. The vessel was a tender to the Spanish frigate Astraea, then awaiting her at Paita. Two days later, Port-au-Prince and Lucy challenged Astrea to come out of the port of Paita and engage them. Astraea, of 44 guns, was under the command of a Frenchman, M. de Vaudrieul. In addition to her crew, Astrea had several hundred soldiers aboard. An inconclusive engagement followed in which Port au Prince lost a boy killed and had several men wounded, including Duck, before Astraea broke off the fight and returned to Paita. Some time later Port au Prince encountered the American vessel Neutrality and heard from her captain that Astraea had suffered 30 men killed, 120 men wounded, and damage to her fore-topmast. Supposedly, Vaudreuil had stated that at the end of the combat on the first day his Spanish officers had urged him to strike, and that he would have done so, had the two British vessels boarded him. However, Mariner reported that Astraea had on board several deserters from Port au Prince and that they had told Vaudreuil that Port au Prince was short of shot and men. Lucy had six men wounded, of whom five recovered. She also had one man killed, a Spanish prisoner, the captain of a felucca she had captured some time earlier.

Lucy transferred some shot to Port au Prince, and resupplied herself from the supplies that the tender had been delivering to Astraea. The British put a prize crew on the tender and sent her to James Island, in the Gallipago Islands.

Two days after the initial engagement the two British vessels again attempted to capture Astraea, but she repelled their attack. She was anchored and easily able to fire on them as they sailed past. Port au Prince had one man killed.

Port au Prince and Lucy then sailed to the Galapagos, arriving at Chatham Island on the 16th. The prize they had sent to the islands was not there and nothing further was ever heard of her. Port au Prince and Lucy divided equally the silver and dollars they had captured while operating together. The two then separated. (Note: Lucy sailed on to Panama and then the Marquesas where she left seven mutinous crew men. She next sailed on to Tahiti in search of information about Minerva and finally arrived at Port Jackson. She arrived on 21 April 1806 from "Chili", to repair. She sailed for Penang on 26 March 1807.)

On 30 March 1806 Port au Prince captured the Spanish brig Santa Isidora, Captain Josef Evernzega, master, about half-a-dozen miles off Acapulco. Santa Isidora had been sailing from Guiàquil to Acapaculco with a cargo of cocoa. Duck put the Spanish prisoners in her boats so that they could reach the town. He then put Mr. John Parker in charge of the brig and gave him ten crew men and provisions for four months with instructions to sail for Port Jackson. Santa Isidora never arrived at New South Wales. One report was that the inhabitants of the Paumotu Islands captured her and massacred the crew.

On 18 June 1806 Port au Prince's boats entered San Blas (possibly San Blas, Nayarit), and captured Santa Anna. Santa Anna was a "corbetta" under the command of Captain Francisco Puertas and carrying a cargo of pitch, tar, and cedar boards to Guayaquil. The next day Duck sent 20 of his Spanish prisoners ashore in his longboat. Two Spaniards and two negro slaves joined Port au Prince. The slaves belonged to Santa Anna's owner and legally Duck should have sent them ashore too, but they pleaded not to have to go ashore and Duck yielded to their pleas. Duck then put Mr. Charles Maclaren in command of Santa Anna and gave him a crew of 12 men plus a Spaniard to navigate her. Santa Anna did reach Port Jackson, where Maclaren sold her per his instructions. Her new owners then employed Santa Anna as a whaler.

Port au Prince turned back to whaling and killed some 15 whales; she also killed over 8000 seals for their skins. Captain Duck died on 11 August and Mr. William Brown, the whaling master, replaced him in command.

== Loss and aftermath ==
She dropped anchor again for the last time on 29 November 1806 at an island called Lifuka in the Ha'apai Group, Kingdom of Tonga. It was here that the Tongans reportedly massacred Captain Brown and 36 men of her 62-man crew, and burnt the ship to the waterline after removing all her arms and whatever else they found useful.

Some of the survivors stayed in the vicinity. In Tonga on 15 August 1827, Peter Dillon, captain of the Research, met with John Singleton, one of the crew.

In May 1832, HMS Zebra stopped at Keppel's Island. There she found William Brown, J. Roberts (a negro), and all survivors of Port au Prince. Either Brown or Roberts was acting as interpreter for the king there. (Note: For a fuller account see Allen.)

If Port au Prince had been successful in capturing treasure from the Spaniards, her haul of treasure went down with her.

== Rumours ==
Well after the Tongans had seized and scuttled Port au Prince and murdered her crew, Lloyd's List (LL) reported two third-party reports about her. On 30 September 1808, LL reported that "'Port au Prince', of London, which was reported captured around Cape Horn, was well at the Marquisa Islands about 5 Months since." She was reported to have been at Rio de Janeiro on 25 November 1808.

Then on 19 May 1809, Lloyd's List reported "The Port au Prince, of London, is taken at Tongataboo Island, in the South Pacific Ocean. Crew killed."

== Discovery of the wreck ==
In August 2012, the wreck of Port au Prince was discovered off the coast of Foa Island (19°45′S 174°18′W), in Tonga.

The Greenwich Maritime Museum and the Marine Archaeological Society both confirmed the age of the wreck after analysing copper sheathing found at the site. The sheathing was only used between 1780 and 1850 to combat shipworm and marine weeds and so given the location of the wreck it is considered likely to be the remains of Port au Prince.
