= Fīnau ʻUlukālala =

Polynesian royal dynasty

Fīnau ʻUlukālala (Hot Headed) was a dynasty of six important hereditary chiefs from Vavaʻu (the Tuʻi Vavaʻu), currently in the kingdom of Tonga. The dynasty began sometime in the 18th century and died out in 1960. The chief's original estate was Tuʻanuku, and his nickname and that of the village is Tavakefaiʻana (a species of tropicbird).

== Holders of the title ==
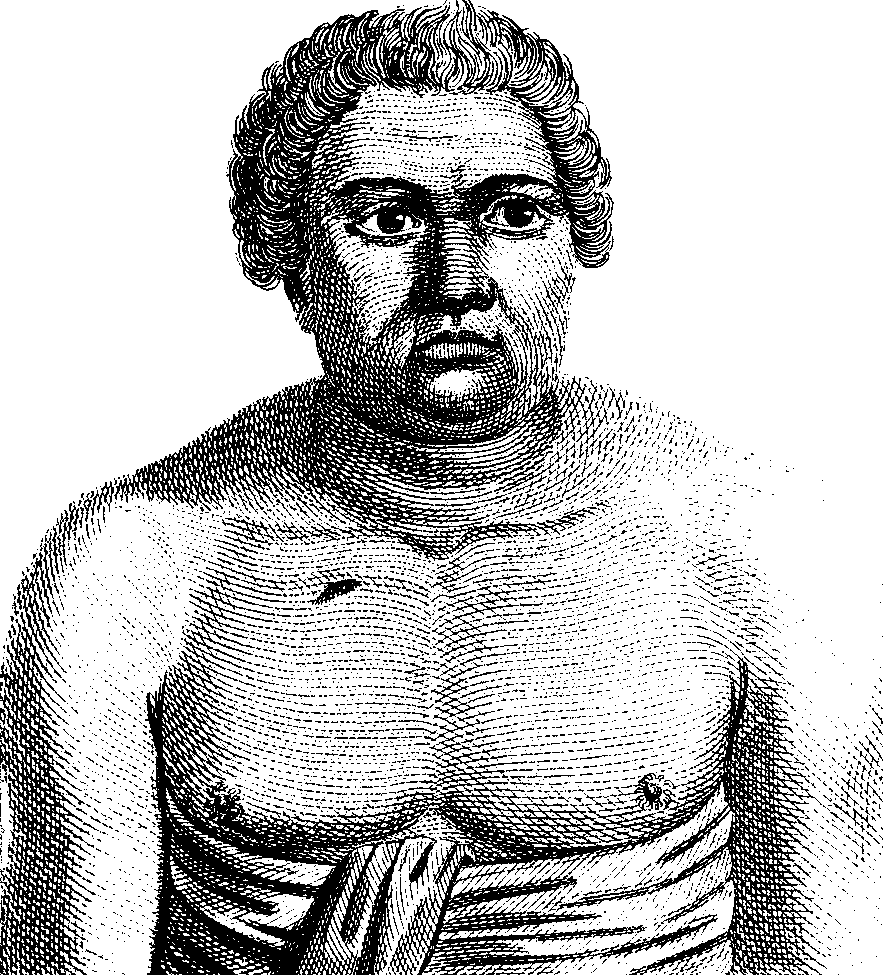
Fīnau I (or his brother) from Jacques Labillardière, 1793

=== I (ʻi Maʻofanga) ===
Although the first Fīnau (ʻUlukālala I's grandfather, Mataelehaʻamea), had been a Tuʻi Kanokupolu (at that time, around 1650, the most powerful royal dynasty of Tongatapu), his father Tuʻituʻiʻohu was only a younger brother of Maʻafuʻotuʻitonga, the next Tuʻi Kanokupolu. As such Tuʻituʻiʻohu tried his luck in Vavaʻu, where he started the dynasty of the Haʻa Ngatatupu.

This first Fīnau died in 1797 in Maʻufanga, Tongatapu and is therefore also called Fīnau ʻUlukālala I ʻi Maʻofanga (the old form of the name of the village). He was succeeded by his eldest son who would die later in Feletoa, Vavaʻu, and as such is sometimes known as Fīnau ʻUlukālala II ʻi Feletoa, or by his second name: Fangupō.

=== Feletoa ===
At the end of the 18th century, due to the unpopularity of the then incumbent Tuʻi Kanokupolu, Tukuʻaho, who was a cruel and arbitrary person, Fīnau Feletoa (ʻUlukālala II) was able to extend his authority to Haʻapai as well, which made him the most powerful chief of whole Tonga at that time. Yet it seems not to have been his intention to take Tongatapu too. It was sufficient for him just to keep the chiefs of that island away from interfering with his Haʻapai and Vavaʻu. For that he was the main originator of the plan to murder the Tuʻi Kanokupolu. With a triumvirate comprising him, Tupouniua and Tupoutoʻa the act was done in April 1799 during the yearly ʻinasi (first-fruits offering) to the Tuʻi Tonga in Muʻa.

Unfortunately this did not bring the peace he had hoped for, but started off a civil war in Tonga which would last for the next 50 years or so. Fīnau did not try to conquer Tongatapu, but limited himself to some raids on the island. The most severe one was against Tupoumālohi in his fortress of Nukuʻalofa in 1807, in which the cannons he got from the Port au Prince were very useful. The writings of his protégé, William Mariner, go into great detail about these happenings and also the personality of this famous warlord.

He was also infamous, however, for the punishment he inflicted on some of his enemies: they were tied to leaking canoes, which were then set adrift at sea, soon to sink with their victims.

=== Moengangongo ===
Fīnau Fangupō died in 1809 and was succeeded by his son Fīnau ʻUlukālala Moengangongo who decided to cut all links with the troublesome Tongatapu and ordered that both Haʻapai and Vavaʻu should pursue an isolationist policy. If it had not been for the coming of Tāufaʻāhau I, perhaps Tonga would have ended up as 3 independent nations.

He was close friends with William Mariner, who described Moengangongo as a very intelligent and curious individual. He independently figured out how a musket works, and frequently held discussions with Mariner about astronomy, physics, etc. When Mariner was being rescued by a European ship, Moengangongo begged to be allowed to go to England, despite his awareness of losing his status as a king, because he wished to learn how to read, write, and gain knowledge about the world.

Moengangongo had died 2 years later, which is probably the reason that he has not gone into history as ʻUlukālala III.

=== Tuapasi ===
Fīnau ʻUlukālala III, best known in history as Fīnau ʻUlukālala III ʻi Pouono (the part of Neiafu where he would die), also named Tuapasi. He was the second son of Fīnau Fangupō and became Tuʻi Vavaʻu (Vavaʻu king) in 1811, although it was not until 1820 before he got all the islands under control. When he died in March 1833 he ceded Vavaʻu to his rearcousin and son in law Tāufaʻāhau I, as it was clear by then who was the most powerful person in Tonga. It was, after Haʻapai, the second island group of Tonga Tāufaʻāhau obtained in his way towards being king of all Tonga. It was therefore still in Vavaʻu, in fact at Pouono, on 20 November 1839 that Tāufaʻāhau declared himself king of Tonga and, having become Christian, ceded it then to God.

=== Matekitonga ===
Tupou Toutai Nafetalai Matekitonga was the name of Fīnau ʻUlukālala IV, the only son of his father, born in the same year (1833) that the latter died. He grew up to be a vassal to Tāufaʻāhau, fought, for example, in 1853 with him and Cakobau against another Fijian chief, Mara Kapaiwai and was rewarded with the noble title of ʻUlukālala when Tāufaʻāhau, by then known as king Siaosi I, proclaimed the constitution in 1875 and abolished all old chiefly titles and subtitles, except for 20, who were elevated to noble status (and another 10 in 1880). From that time on the proper way to refer to these nobles is by their title only with, if needed, an identifying name between parenthesis after it.

=== Mīsini ===
His son Siaosi Fīnau Mīsini succeeded him on his death in 1877 as Fīnau ʻUlukālala V (Mīsini), and he fulfilled positions like governor of Vavaʻu, several ministerial posts in the young Tongan government and was even regent. He died in 1938.

=== Haʻamea ===
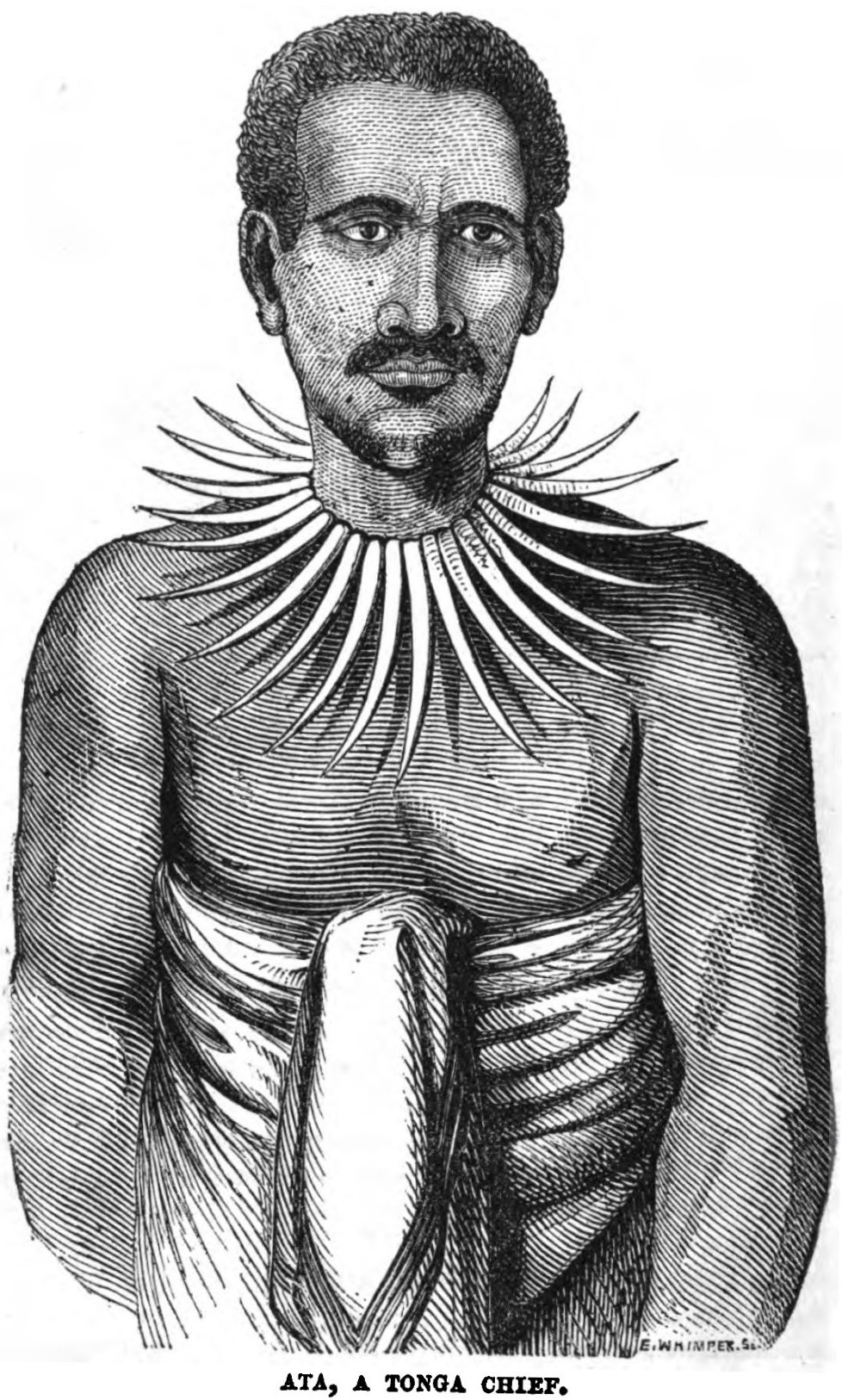
Ata, a Tonga Chief (December 1853, X, p.132)

The last of the dynasty was Siaosi Tangata-ʻo-Haʻamea who became ʻUlukālala VI (Haʻamea). As his mother's line died out without successors, he also was installed, later, with the noble title of Ata, from Kolovai. Around 1930 he was interested in marrying Fusipala, the half sister of queen Sālote Tupou. However, Sālote and her consort Tungī Mailefihi did not see this as a deference of the Vavaʻu noble to the throne, but rather as a plot of him to break away from Tonga and to establish an independent Vavaʻu kingdom. They refused. Fusipala died in 1933, unmarried. Siaosi fathered unmarried children and was later married to Amelia Tuna Kaimanu Vaea, they had one adopted daughter, Takukipulotu. The eldest of the unmarried children of 'Ulukalala Ha'amea was a son by the name of Sione Potauaine Kuliha'apai who married twice, his wives named Heu and Mele Liliola who both had issue. One of 'Ulukalala Ha'amea other unmarried children, a daughter by the name 'Eva, who married to noble Ve'ehala, and had issue.

=== ʻAhoʻeitu ===
Siaosi died on 12 September 1960 without a married son. The title ʻUlukālala, and Ata as well, were then taken away from the original heir by king Tāufaʻāhau Tupou IV. At the end both were given to the king's youngest son ʻAho‘eitu ʻUnuakiʻotonga Tukuʻaho (who already had the title Lavaka from Pea, and so ended up with 3 noble titles).

=== Siaosi Manumataongo ===
After the death of king Tāufaʻāhau Tupou IV and the accession of Siaosi Tupou V, ʻAhoʻeitu became the heir presumptive and had to give up, backdated to 11 September, the title in favour of his son, Siaosi Manumataongo ʻAlaivahamamaʻo ʻAhoʻeitu Konstantin Tukuʻaho, who was officially installed to it on 30 September 2006. In 2012 ʻAhoʻeitu became King and Siaosi Manumataongo became Crown Prince 'Ulukalala.
