= Edgar Leeteg =

American painter (1904–1953)

Edgar William Leeteg (April 13, 1904 East St. Louis, Illinois – February 7, 1953 Papeete, Tahiti) was an American painter often considered the father of American velvet painting. He immigrated to French Polynesia in 1933, where he spent the rest of his life painting the local life on black velvet.

== Early career ==
Leeteg was the son of a butcher and the grandson of a German grave sculptor. His great-grandfather was an architect; the name was originally Lütig. When he was sixteen he went to work for his uncle in Little Rock, Arkansas, and later worked picking cotton in Louisiana, as foundry worker in Illinois, a cowboy in Texas and odd jobs in Alaska. At the age of 22, Leeteg worked as a billboard painter and sign writer for a large outdoor advertising company, Foster & Kleiser, in Sacramento, California, before the Great Depression made conditions difficult. He was foreman with the company, and the other workers resented him, work being limited. They felt that since he was a bachelor (he had been married twice), their economic needs exceeded his. He had been to Tahiti on vacation in 1930 and when a contact there invited him to return with a job offer, he accepted it, after discussing the economic problems in the US with his mother Bertha (who agreed that prospects were dismal). With a small inheritance from his grandfather in Germany, Leeteg and his mother moved to Tahiti in 1933 with a few brushes and some paint stolen from the sign company. At first he worked as a sign-painter for theatres and cinemas but barely made a living. His mother ran a restaurant, but went broke and returned to the US. Edgar stayed and took whatever work he could find. Using the island women as models, he sold paintings to bars and visiting tourists. He tried various media including wood and cloth, but finally settled on black velvet with astounding success.

When he had sufficient funds, he returned to the US to fetch his mother who lived with him in French Polynesia for the rest of his life. While back from Tahiti, he worked as a sign painter in Honolulu where he won first prize at the Hawaiian Orchid Fanciers' Show for an oil painting of orchids. Leeteg obtained a patron, Wayne Decker, almost by accident. Decker saw a painting of Hilo Hattie on black velvet in a shop in the Royal Hawaiian Hotel, but when he returned some months later, the painting was gone. The shopkeeper could not remember the name of the artist. Almost a year later, he and his family were in Tahiti and saw some Leeteg paintings in a tourist shop including his now famous Hina Rapa. The Deckers arranged to meet Leeteg and paid him to paint six paintings for them. After the commissioned paintings arrived at their home in Salt Lake City, they made a deal with Leeteg to paint at least ten paintings a year for them. The deal lasted until Leeteg's death and the Deckers accumulated more than two hundred of Leeteg's velvet paintings. It was the Deckers' financial support that ensured Leeteg's economic survival, but it was Honolulu art dealer Bernard ("Barney") Davis who would make him famous.

== Rise to popularity ==
Leeteg's best work was done between the years 1938 and 1953. He lived in Cook's Bay (Paopao), Moorea, using exotic women of the island as his models that he would find in the bars of Papeete, such as Quinn's Tahitian Hut. His main subject was beautiful Polynesian women, and he painted them amidst their background, their culture and their history. The eroticism, color and detail of these paintings made him famous.

Leeteg's popularity soared following a fortunate meeting with Honolulu art gallery owner Barney Davis, who became his agent. It was with Davis' help that Leeteg built his great Villa Velour estate in Moorea. Davis worked as Leeteg's agent and they had a fruitful and profitable relationship together. His paintings were popular in bars in America and Polynesia.

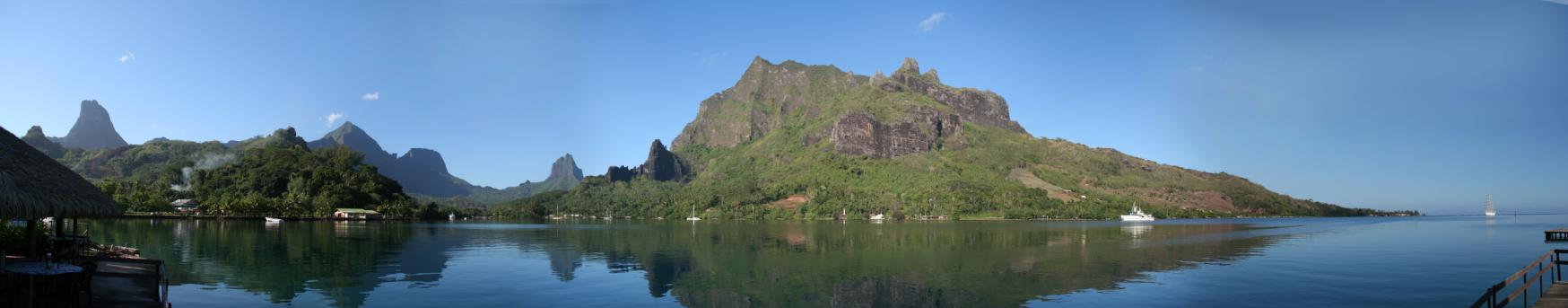
Cook's (Paopao ) Bay on the island of Moorea, site of Leeteg's extravagant estate, Villa Velour.

Davis branded Leeteg the 'American Gauguin', and soon Leeteg's paintings were being sold for thousands of dollars. Fame as an artist is something he never expected saying, "My paintings belong in a gin mill, not a museum. If this modern crap is art, then just call my paintings beautiful. Don't call them art." James Michener called him "... at least the Remington of the South Seas."

Photographs of Leeteg are few, but Michener described him as "short, not more than five feet three, with a round face and sparse black hair. The mouth is ample, the lower jaw juts forward slightly, the nose is large. His eyes are a steely blue." He writes that he suffered from elephantiasis but that it was controlled with the drug Hetrazan. He had three children, a daughter and son (Laverne and Edgar, Jr) from Jackie Cadousteau and one son (William) from Stella Ebb. He hung out at Tahiti's famous bar Quinn's Tahitian Hut and was a friend of Mutiny on the Bounty author James Norman Hall, who lived in Papeete.

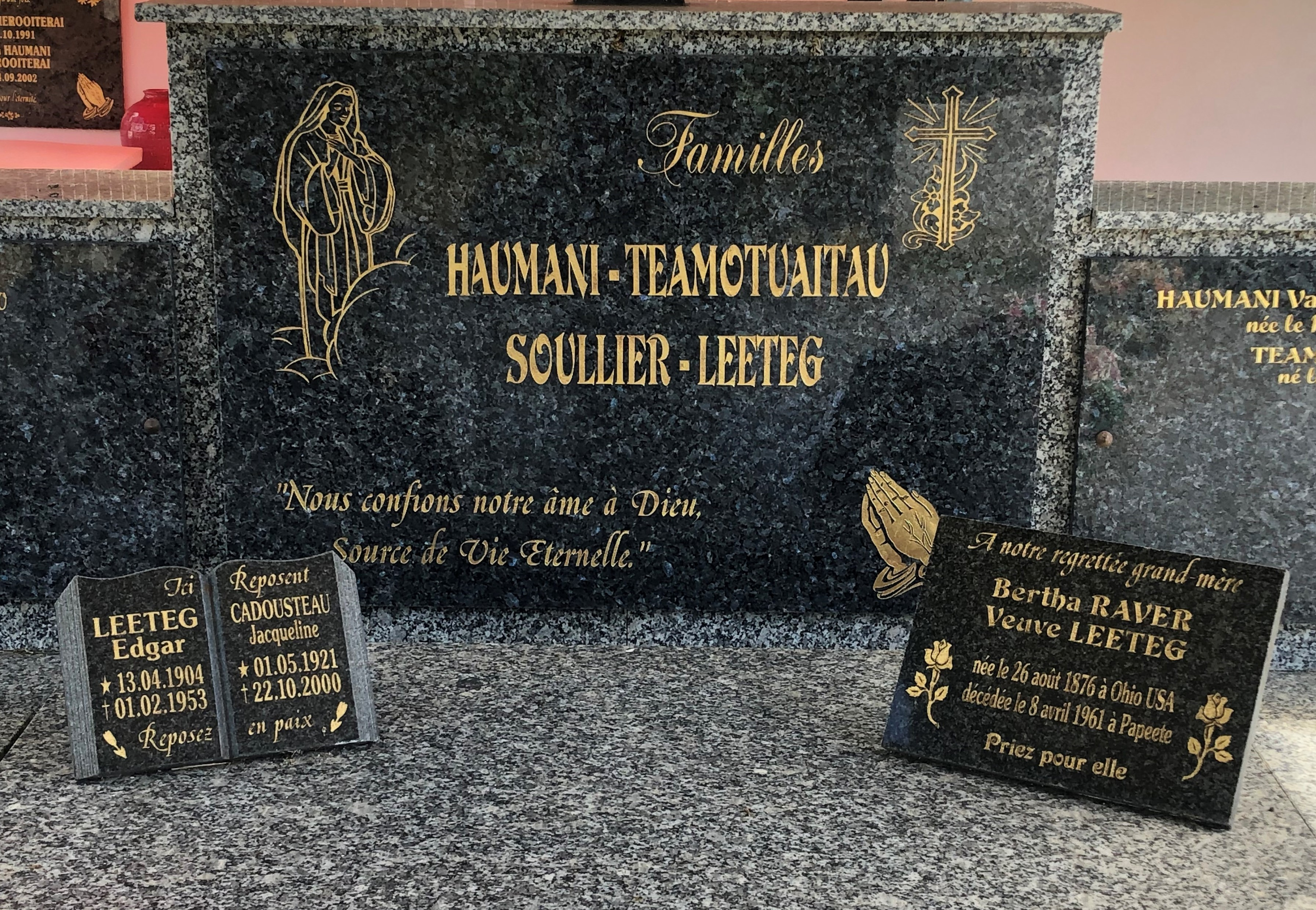

Edgar Leeteg died in 1953 in a motorcycle crash in Papeete at the age of 49 following a party at Les Tropiques resort. He had been suffering from a strain of venereal disease resistant to all antibiotics discovered up to that time. A close friend of his was reported by a Frenchwoman living in Punaauia to have released this information to the people of the islands with the advice that their women stay away from him. He was buried in Papeete in the family crypt of American friend Lew Hirshon. His mother Bertha was too ill to travel from Moorea to Tahiti for the funeral. Later, his body moved to a small cemetery east of Papeete, where Jackie and his mother were buried.11

As was the case with other popular artists such as Tretchikoff and Margaret Keane, Leeteg was never accepted by the art establishment. He had to fight to have his paintings allowed into the US as "fine art" rather than as a "craft" which had a much higher rate of import duty. Of his eight most popular subjects, seven were copied from photographs by other men. This caused many plagiarism disputes but at that time copyright had to be registered to be protected, and few photographers went to the trouble and expense of submitting their work to the copyright office. One of those subjects was a famous painting Head of Christ by Warner Sallman. This work was protected and he was forced to stop painting his copies publicly but continued to do so clandestinely on request. After his death, Leeteg's paintings rose in value to as much as $20,000 in the early 1960s but have subsequently declined in value considerably. Nevertheless, he has continued to have his ardent admirers.

== In popular culture ==
The video game Psychonauts features a character named Edgar Teglee, a black velvet painter.

“Black Velvet", the song, is a tribute to Elvis Presley, whose portrait was often painted on black velvet. Canadian songwriters Christopher Ward and David Tyson wrote the song, initially recorded by Alannah Myles in 1990.
