= Nukuʻalofa =

Capital of Tonga

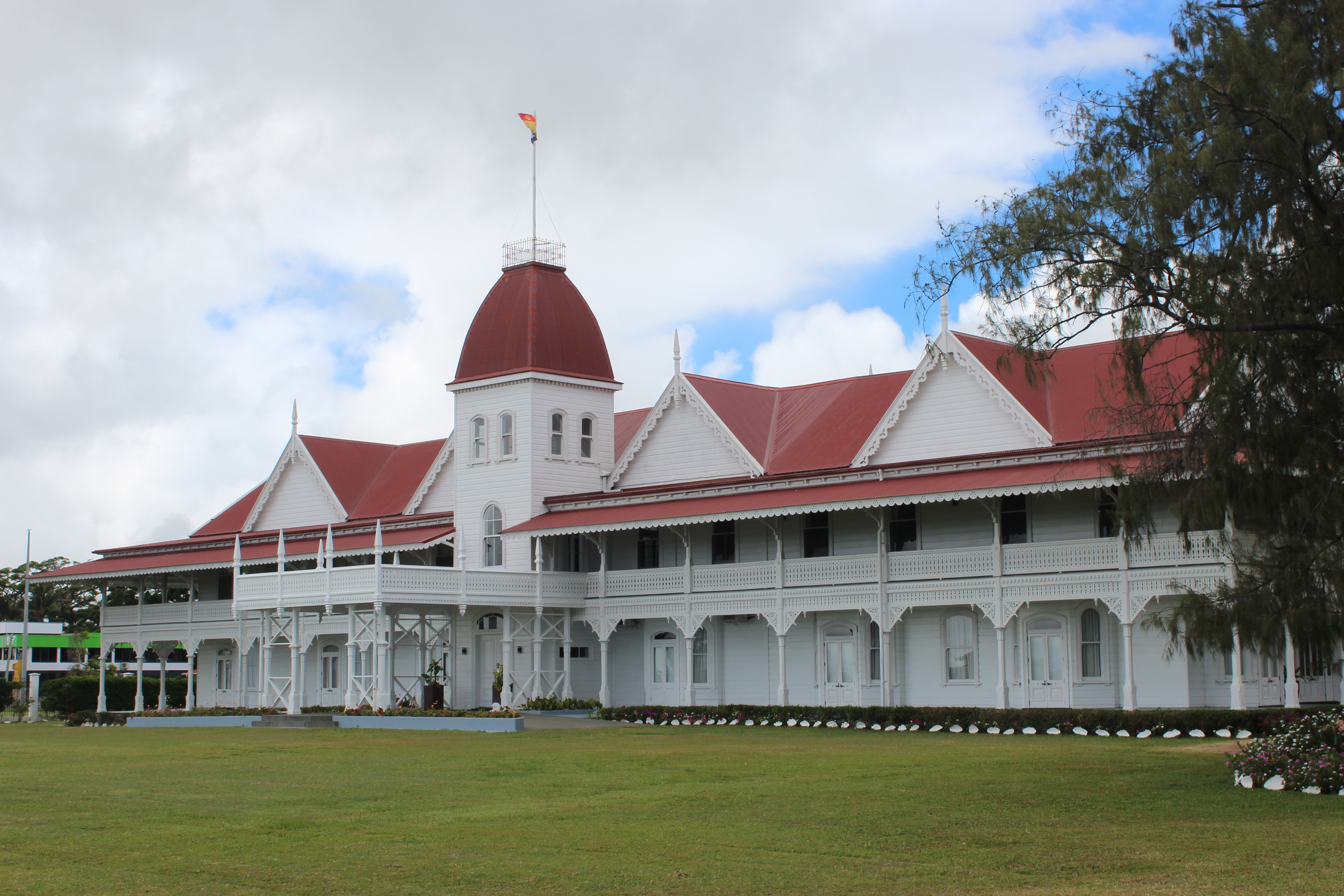
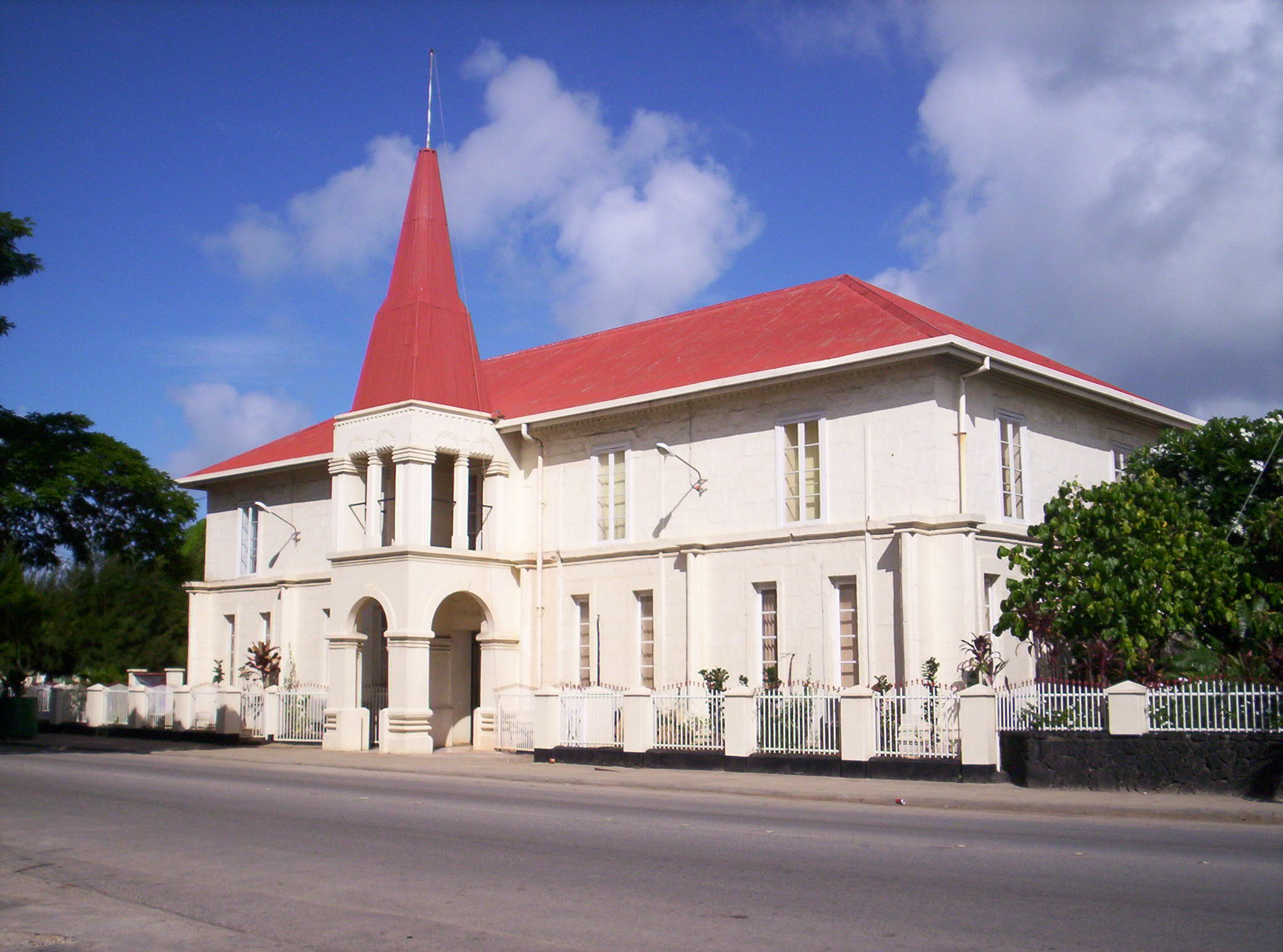
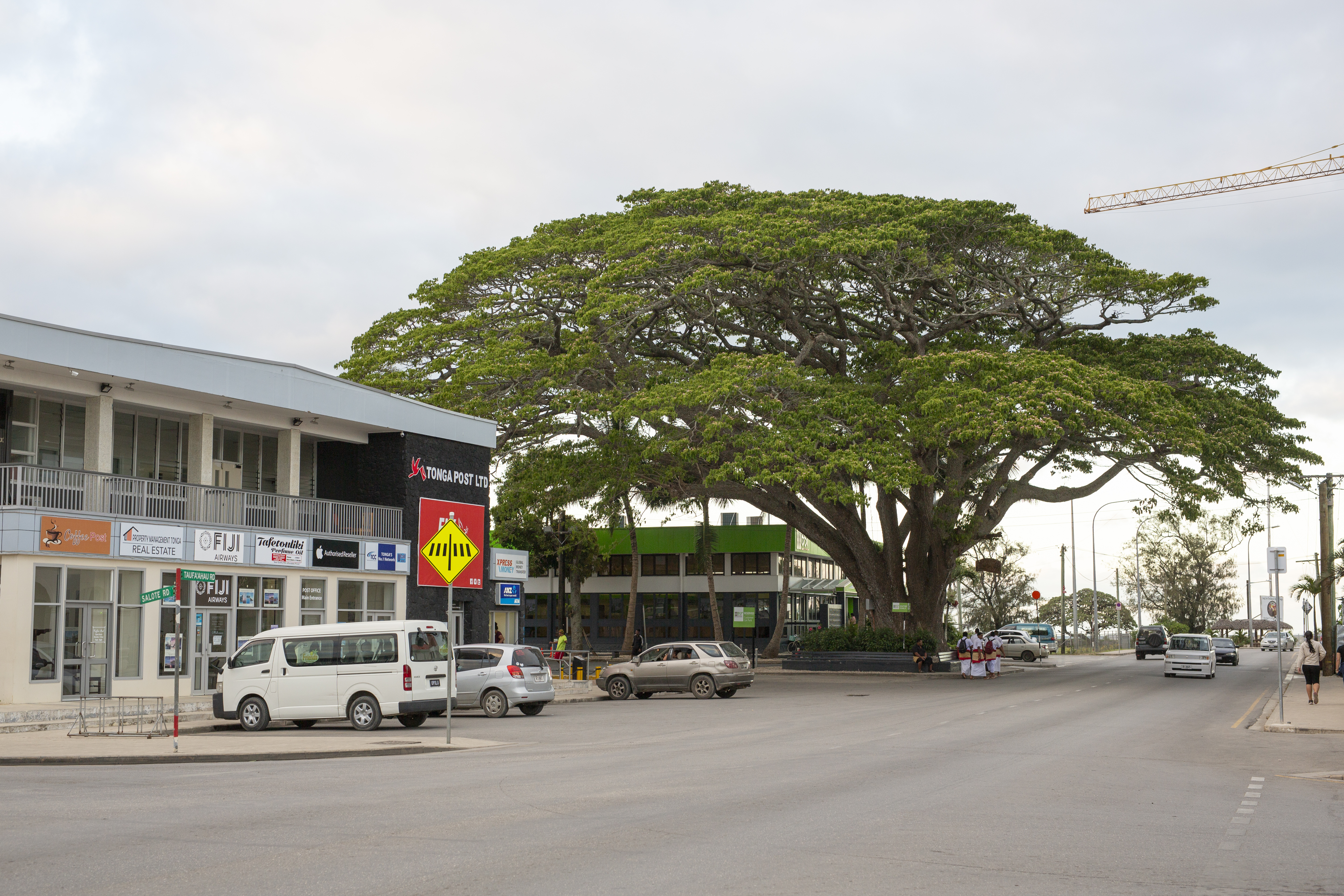
- From top (left to right) Royal Palace of Tonga, Free Church of Tonga, Old Prime Minister's Office and Downtown Nukuʻalofa

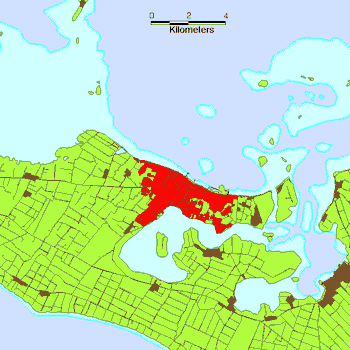
- Location of Nukuʻalofa on Tongatapu

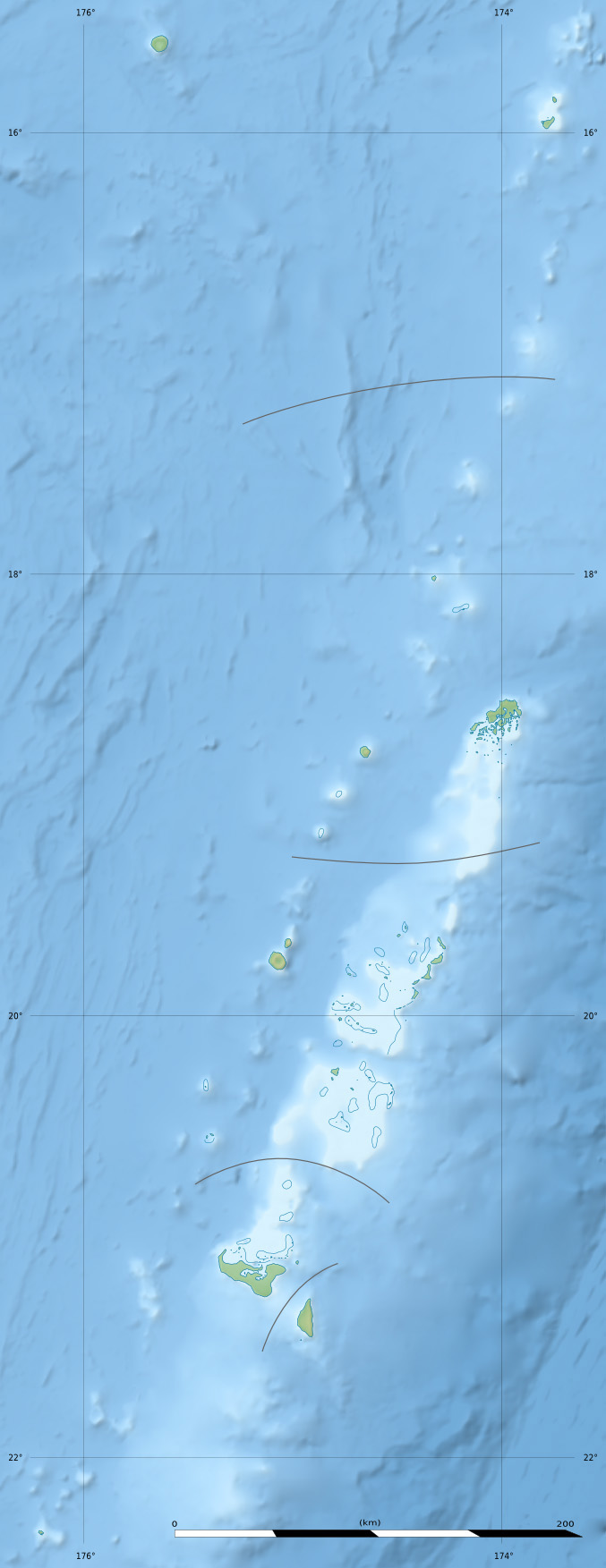
- Location within Tonga
- Coordinates: 21°8′0″S 175°12′0″W
- Country: Tonga
- Island: Tongatapu

Area
  - City: 19 km^{2} (7.3 sq mi)
- Elevation: 3 m (9.8 ft)
- Highest elevation: 6 m (20 ft)

Population (2022)
  - City: 27,600
  - Metro: 74,454
- Time zone: UTC+13
- Postal code: 00196-8000
- Area code: 676
- Climate: Tropical rainforest climate (Af)

Nukuʻalofa (/ˌnuːkuəˈloʊfə/ NOO-koo-ə-LOH-fə, Tongan: [nukuʔaˈlofa]) is the capital and largest city of Tonga. It is located on the north coast of the island of Tongatapu, in the country's southernmost island group. It is the world's westernmost capital of a sovereign state.

== History ==
=== 18th century ===
On 10 June 1777, British captain James Cook wrote of his arrival at their anchorage place. His description of the place confirmed, with his map, that this was the bay of Nukuʻalofa.

At length, about two in the afternoon, we arrived at our intended station. It was a very snug place, formed by the shore of Tongataboo on the South East, and two small islands on the East and North East. Here we anchored in ten fathoms water, over a bottom of oozy sand; distant from the shore one-third of a mile [500 m].

Cook never used the name Nukualofa or any alternative spelling for the reports of this voyage, but he mentioned the island of Pangaimodoo (Pangaimotu) which was to the east of his anchorage position. Captain Cook also wrote that he travelled by canoes to visit Mooa (Muʻa) where Paulaho and other great men lived. The house that Paulaho provided was on the beach 500 metres (1/3 mi) from the ship. Reference to his map shows that he must have landed and stayed in the Siesia area, the eastern part of modern Nukuʻalofa. Cook also drafted the first map of the bay of Nukuʻalofa.

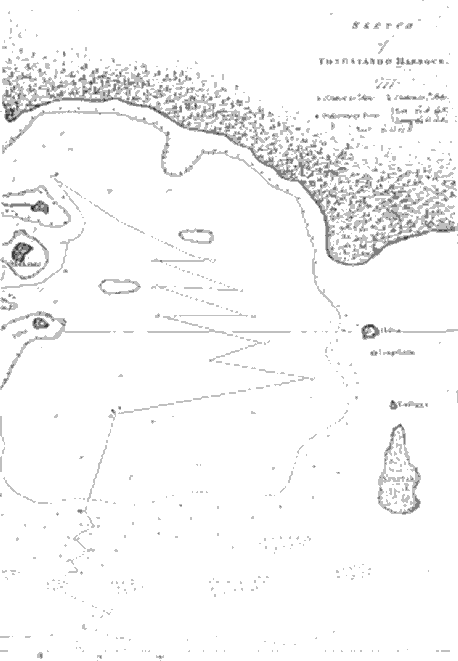
The first recorded Map of Tongataboo Harbour as sketched by Captain Cook in 1777. The map clearly shows the Bay of Nukuʻalofa and his anchored position near Pangaimotu. Small islands of Nukuʻalofa were named with phonetic spelling, including Atata, Pangaimotu, Makahaʻa, and Fetoa.

The first written record for Nukuʻalofa is stated in the first dedicated book for Tonga by George Vason which was published in 1810. George Vason was an English missionary from the London Missionary Society, who arrived in Tonga in 1797. George Vason wrote of their arrival that:

"Before we could well come to an anchor, the ship was surrounded by the natives, who flocked to us from every adjacent Island. The place, before which we anchored, was called Noogollefa: it was near an Island, named Bonghy-moddoo; on which former navigators pitched their tents, as a convenient spot, on account of its separation from the main Island, to preserve themselves from being too much incommoded by the natives."

That was the first mention of Nukuʻalofa, spelled as Noogoollefa. Vason's unusual spelling of Nukuʻalofa and Pangaimotu (as "Bonghy-Moddoo") was because the standard Tongan alphabet would not be developed until 1826–27.

The second-oldest book dedicated to Tonga was by William Mariner, adopted son of Fīnau ʻUlukālala, which was published in 1817. Mariner described his experiences during the years he was the adopted son of ʻUlukālala (1806–1810). He described the civil war and the siege of the Fort of Nukuʻalofa, which fell to ʻUlukālala and his warriors.

The third attempt of Christian missionaries was recorded in April 1826, when two Tahitian London Missionaries were detained by Tupou, the chief of Nukuʻalofa.

In March 1826, the four men left Tahiti in the Minerva, their destination Fiji. But at Nukuʻalofa, Tonga, their plans were disrupted by the high chief Tupou (Aleamotuʻa). From Davies' perspective, the Tahitians were placed under detention at Tongatapu: "The chief called Tupou would not let them proceed. He had been himself a resident in Lageba and calls himself the friend of Tuineau, the chief of Lageba, and as such he took possession of the present intended for the Fijian chief".

The arrival of the Methodist missionaries in Nukuʻalofa in 1827 reinforced the Christian faith. The persecution suffered by Christians in Hihifo and Hahake forced a lot of people to seek refuge in Nukuʻalofa. As a result of the encouragement of Tupou, the King of Nukuʻalofa, this was the beginning of the expandsion of Nukuʻalofa to become the major center of Christianity in Tonga.

The US Exploring Expedition met with King Josiah (Aleamotuʻa) in 1840.

The final phase in the arrival of Christianity in Tonga was the arrival of Father Chevron, or Patele Sevelo, in 1842. He wrote that he arrived in Nukuʻalofa in 1842 and met the Tuʻi Kanokupolu Aleamotuʻa, who was baptised by the Wesleyan as Sosaia.

In conclusion, these landings turned Nukuʻalofa from a small village and fort into the center of Tonga during the introduction of Christianity. From the earliest records for Nukuʻalofa, early writers always referred to the settlement as Noogollefa (1797), Nioocalofa (1806), Nukualofa (1826 by Methodists) and Noukou-Alofa (1842 by French Catholic priests). There was no other mention of any other name of the settlement other than the settlement or fort of Nukuʻalofa.

=== 19th and 20th centuries ===
==== Capital of the Kingdom of Tonga (1875 and later) ====
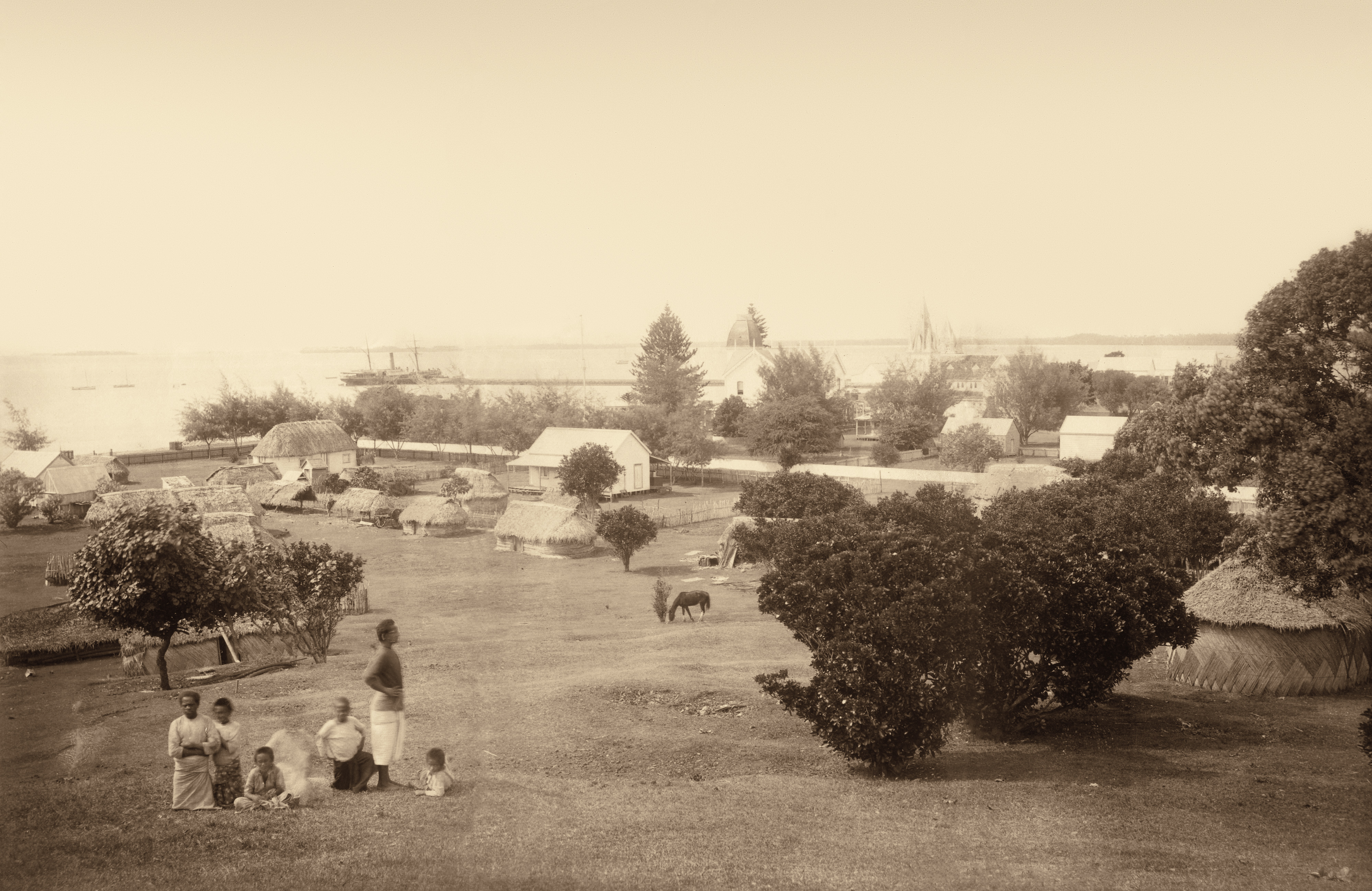
Nukuʻalofa in 1887

The Declaration of the Constitution of Tonga in 1875 formalised Nukuʻalofa as the Capital of Tonga. King George Taufaʻahau Tupou I issued the Constitution of Tonga on 4 November 1875, in Nukuʻalofa. The Constitution also stated (Article 38) that the Parliament will meet in Nukuʻalofa except in time of war.

=== Expansion and reorganisation ===
Since Nukuʻalofa has been expanding since it became the center of Christianity in Tonga in the 19th century, it became essential that it be reorganised for effective administration of the capital. The reorganisation of Nukuʻalofa divided it up into three major districts: Kolomotuʻa, Kolofoʻou, and Maʻufanga.

==== Kolomotuʻa ====
Kolomotuʻa comes from (Kolo meaning "town" or "settlement", motuʻa meaning "old"), encompassing the city's original settlement at the old fort of Nukualofa, including the area of Tavatuʻutolu (Longolongo), Sopu ʻo Vave (now Sopu ʻo Taufaʻahau), Tongataʻeapa, Tufuenga, Kapeta and all the western area where it was the traditional settlement of the Tuʻi Kanokupolu from Mumui, the 13th Tuʻi Kanokupolu to Aleamotuʻa, the 18th Tuʻi Kanokupolu.

==== Kolofoʻou ====
Kolofoʻou (Kolo meaning "town" foʻou meaning "new"). This area started from the Vahaʻakolo Road and all the eastern side to Maʻufanga, which includes the Palace of King George Taufaʻahau Tupou I and seat of Government, as well as all the new settlements of Fasi moe Afiʻa Tungi, Malie Taha (One Mile), Ngeleʻia, was an old settlement during the civil wars and Taufaʻahau and his warriors destroyed this settlement. Taufaʻahau settled in his kau Toʻa Tautahi (Sea-Warlords) in Nukuʻalofa for his protection and security from enemies and named the area Kolofoʻou (Newtown or Newsettling). This happened after the burning down and fall of Takai's fortress of Pea under the command of his son Moeakiola in 1852. About the same time, Taufaʻahau moved his capital to Kolofoʻou, Nukuʻalofa, after he ruled from Pangai, Haʻapai in 1845.

==== Maʻufanga ====
Maʻufanga is on the eastern side of Nukualofa. Maʻufanga was an old village of the Haʻa Takalaua, which is the Estate of the Chief Fakafanua, now ruled by the Uhamaka family. George Vason mentioned that Maʻufanga was a refugee area during the civil war, where people could take shelter in times of hardship. Maʻufanga is the area facing Pangaimotu, where James Cook anchored, and where Paulaho built him a house on the beach, about 500 metres (1,600 ft) from the ship.

=== 21st century ===
In 2006, a lack of progress towards democracy led to the riots in Nukuʻalofa. During the riots, much of the central business district was burned down.

The capital city was struck by the tsunami caused by the 2022 Hunga Tonga–Hunga Haʻapai eruption. The city reportedly suffered significant damage from the tsunami, which may potentially take years to repair.

== Government ==
The national government is based in Nukuʻalofa. The parliament of Tonga meets there, and the Royal Palace is located near the city.

The name is said to have originated when Moʻungatonga, the 6th Tuʻi Haʻatakalaua (King who governs the daily business of Tonga on behalf of the Tuʻi Tonga or Sacred King of Tonga) sent his youngest son, Ngata (later to be 1st Tuʻi Kanokupolu) as governor to Hihifo (Western side of Tongatapu). It was a difficult decision for Ngata as the Tuʻi Tonga and Tuʻi Haʻatakalaua have been unable to control Hihifo. Ngata had many reasons to fear for his life as his predecessors had been killed by the chiefs and people of Hihifo.

Between 12 and 13 February 2018, the Tongan Parliament House was destroyed by Cyclone Gita, a category 4 cyclone that hit the nation. As a result, the Parliament was moved to the Tongan National Centre, 4 km (2.5 mi) south of the city centre, and that parcel of land gazetted as a part of Nukuʻalofa.

== Climate ==
Nukuʻalofa

Climate chart (precipitation, max. and min. temperature)
J	F	M	A	M	J	J	A	S	O	N	D
174 29 23	210 30 24	206 30 24	165 29 22	111 27 20	95 26 20	95 25 18	117 25 18	122 25 19	128 26 20	123 28 21	175 29 23
- █ Average max. and min. temperatures in °C
- █ Precipitation totals in mm
Imperial conversion
J	F	M	A	M	J	J	A	S	O	N	D
6.9 84 73	8.3 86 75	8.1 86 75	6.5 84 72	4.4 81 68	3.7 79 68	3.7 77 64	4.6 77 64	4.8 77 66	5 79 68	4.8 82 70	6.9 84 73
- █ Average max. and min. temperatures in °F
- █ Precipitation totals in inches

Nukuʻalofa features a tropical rainforest climate (Af) under the Köppen climate classification. The area does experience noticeably wetter and drier periods during the year, but it does not have a true dry season month where monthly precipitation falls below 60 millimetres (2.4 in).

Temperatures are slightly warmer during January and February where average temperatures hover around 25 °C (77 °F) than June and July where the average temperatures is roughly 21 °C (70 °F).

Nukuʻalofa sees a little more than 1,700 millimetres (67 in) of precipitation annually. As the trade winds are almost permanent and cyclones are not rare in Nukuʻalofa, the climate is not equatorial but maritime trade-wind tropical climate.

Climate data for Nukuʻalofa (Elevation: 2m)
Month	Jan	Feb	Mar	Apr	May	Jun	Jul	Aug	Sep	Oct	Nov	Dec	Year
Record high °C (°F)	32 (90)	32 (90)	31 (88)	30 (86)	30 (86)	28 (82)	28 (82)	28 (82)	28 (82)	29 (84)	30 (86)	31 (88)	32 (90)
Mean daily maximum °C (°F)	29.4 (84.9)	29.9 (85.8)	29.6 (85.3)	28.5 (83.3)	26.8 (80.2)	25.8 (78.4)	24.9 (76.8)	24.8 (76.6)	25.3 (77.5)	26.4 (79.5)	27.6 (81.7)	28.7 (83.7)	27.3 (81.1)
Daily mean °C (°F)	26.4 (79.5)	26.8 (80.2)	26.6 (79.9)	25.3 (77.5)	23.6 (74.5)	22.7 (72.9)	21.5 (70.7)	21.5 (70.7)	22.0 (71.6)	23.1 (73.6)	24.4 (75.9)	25.6 (78.1)	24.1 (75.4)
Mean daily minimum °C (°F)	23.4 (74.1)	23.7 (74.7)	23.6 (74.5)	22.1 (71.8)	20.3 (68.5)	19.5 (67.1)	18.1 (64.6)	18.2 (64.8)	18.6 (65.5)	19.7 (67.5)	21.1 (70.0)	22.5 (72.5)	20.9 (69.6)
Record low °C (°F)	16 (61)	17 (63)	15 (59)	15 (59)	13 (55)	11 (52)	10 (50)	11 (52)	11 (52)	12 (54)	13 (55)	16 (61)	10 (50)
Average rainfall mm (inches)	174 (6.9)	210 (8.3)	206 (8.1)	165 (6.5)	111 (4.4)	95 (3.7)	95 (3.7)	117 (4.6)	122 (4.8)	128 (5.0)	123 (4.8)	175 (6.9)	1,721 (67.8)
Average rainy days	17	19	19	17	15	14	15	13	13	11	12	15	180
Average relative humidity (%)	77	78	79	76	78	77	75	75	74	74	73	75	76
Source: Weatherbase

== Economy ==
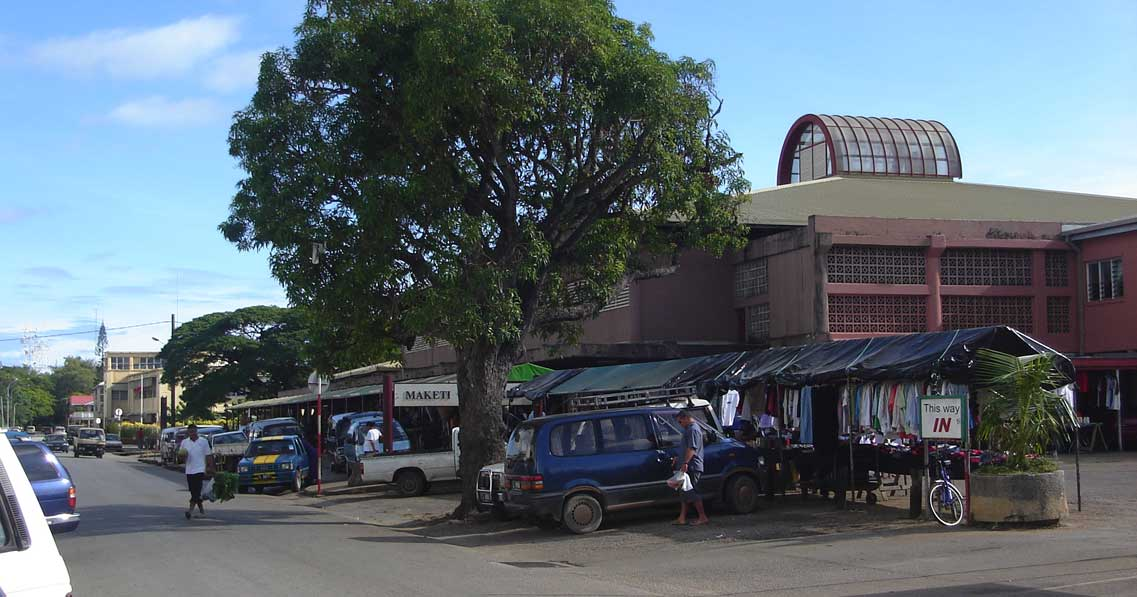
Talamahu Market

A hotel in Nuku'alofa

Nukuʻalofa is the economic hub of the country.

Peau Vavaʻu, an airline, had its head office in the Pacific Royale Hotel in Nukuʻalofa. The former Royal Tongan Airlines had its head office in the Royco Building in Nukuʻalofa.

The city has markets and a central business district. Much of the central business district was destroyed during the 2006 Nukuʻalofa riots. Reconstruction started in 2008, funded by a US$55 million loan from China.

The city has a number of tourist hotels.

== Transport ==
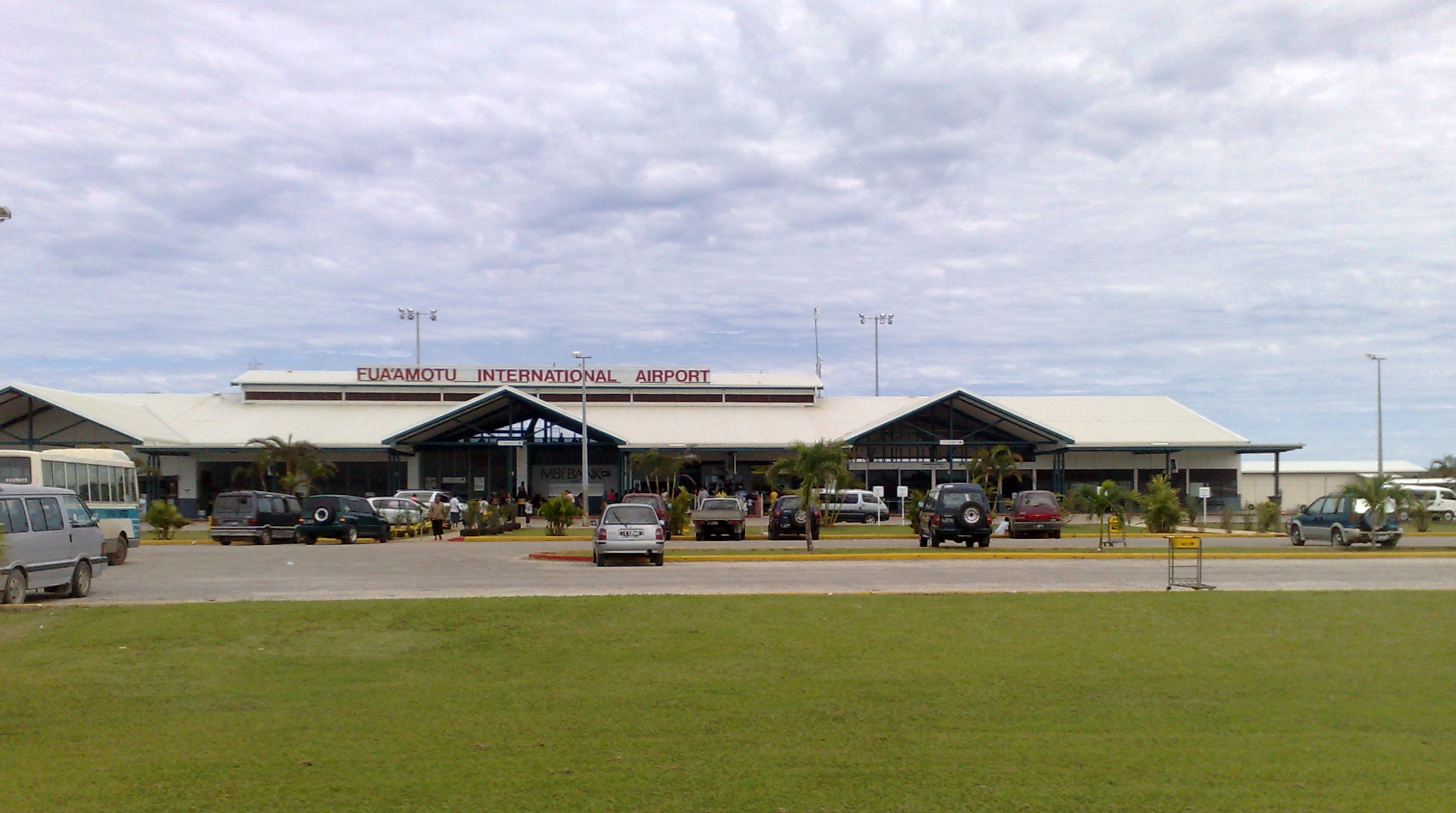
Fuaʻamotu International Airport, near Nukuʻalofa

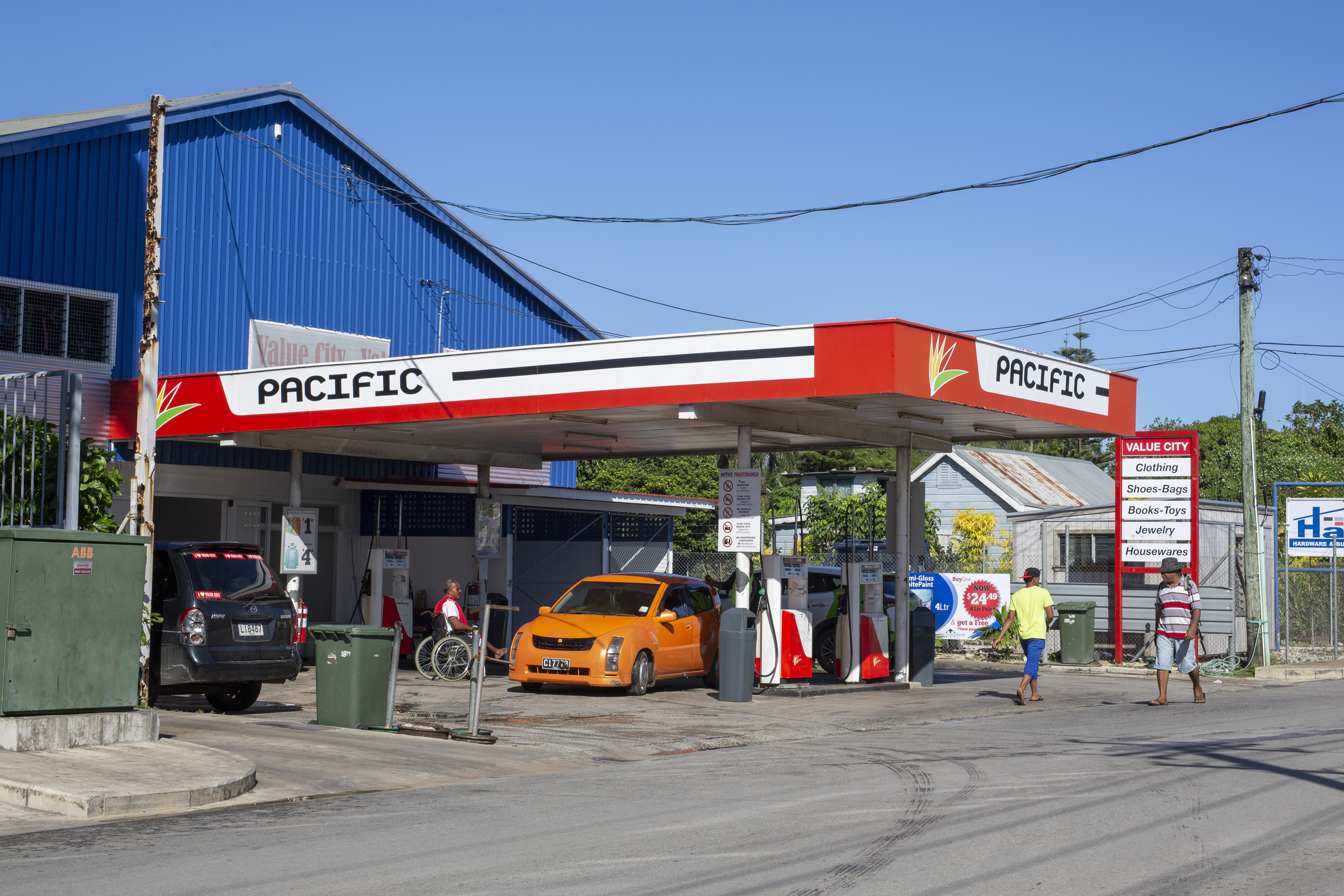
Petrol station in Nuku'alofa

Nukuʻalofa is the central hub for maritime transport in Tonga and the hub for land transport on Tongatapu.

Nukuʻalofa harbour is the only deep-water harbour of the island; this determined the selection of the area as the capital. For many years Vuna Wharf was the international harbour until it was destroyed by an earthquake in 1977. A new, much larger wharf was built approximately 2 kilometres (1.2 mi) eastwards, named after Queen Sālote. Between these two wharves is the wharf numbered '42', used by fishermen and inter-island ferries. It is the central hub for boats to the outer islands. There are usually two boats to ʻEua each day and two to Haʻapai and Vavaʻu each week. In addition to these regular services by shipping companies, private boat owners provide less frequent unscheduled services to smaller islands such as Nomuka and ʻEueiki.

Buses arrive and depart from the central bus station along waterfront Vuna Road close to the centre of town. Bus services are privately operated, and their drivers are free to set their own schedules. Fares are fixed by the government, with reduced rates for school children. The buses are usually filled to capacity. In addition, some schools and large hotels provide their own buses.

There are numerous taxis, also privately owned. Many people who own a car earn extra money by providing taxi services in their spare time. Taxi fares are also set by the government. Most families have their own car; few residents ride bicycles. There are no operational railways or trams in Tonga, although there was once a narrow-gauge railway that ran across the base of the peninsula on which the city is located, between Fangaʻuta lagoon south of the city and the wharf on the north coast, which gave its name to Railway Road.

There is no airport in Nukuʻalofa itself. Air transport is provided by Fuaʻamotu International Airport, 23 kilometres (14 mi) by road from Nukuʻalofa near the village of Fuaʻamotu on the southern side of the island.

== Notable People ==
Kalani Sitake , Head Coach for BYU

== Sister cities ==
Nukuʻalofa is a sister city with:

- Whitby, United Kingdom
- Majuro, Marshall Islands
