= William Mariner (writer) =

English writer on Tonga (1791–1853)

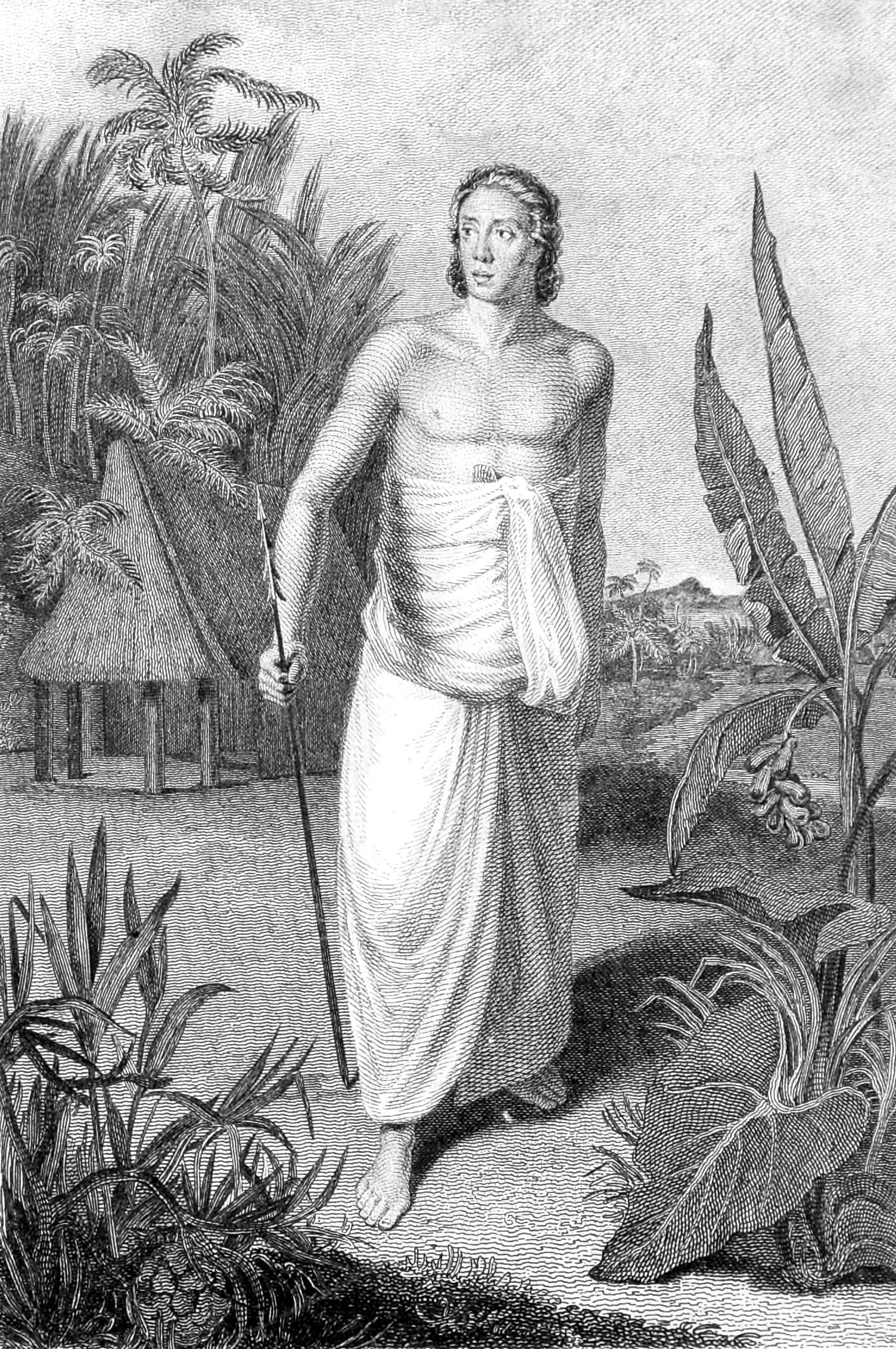
- An 1816 engraving depicting William Mariner in Tongan dress
- Born: William Charles Mariner; 10 September 1791; England
- Died: 20 October 1853 (aged 62)
- Other name: Toki 'Ukamea (Tongan)
- Occupations: Privateer, writer
- Known for: His account of living as a captive in Tonga for four years
- Notable work: The Tongan Islands, William Mariner's account

William Charles Mariner (10 September 1791 – 20 October 1853) was an Englishman who lived in Tonga from 29 November 1806 to (probably) 8 November 1810. His notes were published in 1818 by John Martin in An Account of the Natives of the Tonga Islands, in the South Pacific Ocean, which is one of the major sources of information about Tonga before it was influenced significantly by European cultures and Christianity.

At age 14, Mariner was a ship's clerk aboard the British privateer Port au Prince. In 1806, while it was anchored off the Tongan island of Lifuka, in the Ha'apai island group, Port au Prince was seized by a chief named Fīnau ʻUlukālala. Of the 26 crew members, 22 were killed, while the chief spared Mariner and three others. Mariner lived in Tonga for four years, and during this time he became known as Toki 'Ukamea ("Iron Axe"). After returning to England, he dictated a detailed account of his experiences, a description of Tongan society and culture, and a grammar and dictionary of the Tongan language.

== Background and passage ==
The Port au Prince was an English private ship of war of 500 tons, armed with 24 long nine and twelve-pound guns, and eight 12-pound carronades on the quarterdeck. She carried a "letter of marque" which permitted her captain and crew to become pirates against the enemies of England, primarily France and Spain. In return for their pirate raids, any plunder was to be their own.

Commanded by Captain Duck, she sailed for the New World on 12 February 1805, having been given a twofold commission by her owner, a Mr Robert Bent of London: to attack the Spanish ships of the New World and capture gold and valuables, but if she failed in that task her secondary objective was to sail into the Pacific in search of whales to be rendered for oil.

The Atlantic crossing was rough but uneventful, and she lay off the coast of Brazil by April and then rounded Cape Horn in July before proceeding north in search of Spanish galleons laden with treasure. They captured a number of ships, but most yielded little in the way of valuables, leading the disgruntled crew to contemptuously refer to their catches as "dung barges". The Port-au-Prince was also on the lookout for whales but, although catching a few, experienced little success.

== Arrival in Tonga ==
After leaving Hawaii in September under the command of Mr. Brown, the Port au Prince intended to make port at Tahiti but missed it and instead sailed westward for the Tonga Islands. She arrived in Ha'apai on 9 November 1806, almost two years since departing England and following numerous engagements, episodes of leaking badly, and the death of her captain. She was laden with the spoils of war and cargo amounting to approximately twelve thousand dollars, including a considerable amount of copper, silver, and gold ore. A large number of silver candlesticks, chalices, incense pans, crucifixes, and images were included in the treasure.

The ship anchored in seven fathoms' water off the North West Point of Lifuka Island. A number of chiefs visited it on the evening of her arrival and brought barbecued hogs, yams, and a native of Hawaii who spoke some English and informed Captain Brown that the Tongans had friendly intentions. Finau, the chief of the Ha'apai, apparently took a liking to William Mariner, who reminded him of a son of his who had died of illness. However, the ship's Hawaiian crew members were uneasy and expressed their concerns to the captain that the Tongans were feigning friendliness while simultaneously planning an attack. Captain Brown chose to ignore the sailors' warnings.

The next day, Tongans began to board until there were around 300 in different parts of the ship. They invited Captain Brown ashore to see the island and, assured of their friendly motives, he agreed. Upon reaching land, he was clubbed to death, stripped, and left lying in the sand. Simultaneously, the main attack commenced on the ship. The outnumbered sailors were easily overwhelmed.

Finau had given instructions that the life of Mariner should be spared if at all possible. All but four of the crew members were clubbed to death, their heads so badly beaten as to be unrecognisable. For the next three days, the ship was stripped of her iron, a valuable commodity, and had her guns removed, before being burnt to the water line to more readily remove any remaining iron.

== Sojourn in Tonga ==
Fīnau assumed responsibility for Mariner, taking him under his protection. Mariner became known as Toki 'Ukamea ("Iron Axe") and spent the next four years living amongst the islanders, mostly in the northern island group of Vavaʻu. During his sojourn, he learned the Tongan language and had significant contact with chief leaders in the Vavaʻu island group. He witnessed Fīnau's attempts to unify the islands using the seized cannons.

== Account ==
In 1810, Mariner was rescued and returned to England. He related his story to John Martin, who authored the book An Account of the Natives of the Tonga Islands in the South Pacific Ocean.

Mariner gave a lively description of Fīnau Fangupō (ʻUlukālala II), in particular. In one passage, Mariner quoted Fīnau's opinion of the Western innovation of money:

If money were made of iron and could be converted into knives, axes and chisels there would be some sense in placing a value on it; but as it is, I see none. If a man has more yams than he wants, let him exchange some of them away for pork. [...] Certainly money is much handier and more convenient but then, as it will not spoil by being kept, people will store it up instead of sharing it out as a chief ought to do, and thus become selfish. [...] I understand now very well what it is that makes the papālangi [non-Polynesians] so selfish – it is this money!

There are three major versions of Mariner's account. The original version was published in 1817 by John Murray II, with the help of Dr John Martin, who assumed authorship. Later editions appeared in England in 1818 and 1827, in Germany in 1819, and in the United States in 1820. The Vava'u Press of Tonga issued a new edition in 1981 that includes a biographical essay about Mariner, written by Denis Joroyal McCulloch, one of Mariner's great-great-grandsons, but leaves out the grammar and dictionary. Two modern editions with modern Tongan spelling and other additions have been published, the first by Boyle Townshend Somerville in 1936 and the second by Paul W. Dale in 1996.

== Work ==
- Mariner, William; Martin, John (editor) (1817). An Account of the Natives of the Tonga Islands, in the South Pacific Ocean. With an Original Grammar and Vocabulary of Their Language. Compiled and Arranged from the Extensive Communications of Mr. William Mariner, Several Years Resident in Those Islands • Volume 1. 460 pages. • Volume 2. 412 pages. 2 vols.

== Bibliography ==
- Finau, L.L. (1996). Toki: A Tongan Trilogy : a Historical Novel Based on the Polynesian Life of Will Mariner and Finau Ulukalala of Tonga. San Francisco, California: Simmons Publishing Company. ISBN 978-0-9667463-0-3. ISBN 0-9667463-0-9.
- Michener, James A., Day, Arthur Grove (1957). "Chapter IX: Will Mariner, the Boy Chief of Tonga". Rascals in Paradise. Random House. ISBN 978-0-8129-8686-0. Wikipedia article: Rascals in Paradise (short story collection)
- Mulliss, David (2001). The friendly islands: 1616 to 1900. / A collection of significant moments in the history of the Kingdom of Tonga.
- Westphal, Fritz (1962). Tonga Tabu – The true story of an English naval cadet in the South Seas. London: Methuen & Co.
