= 93.1 FM =

FM radio frequency

The following radio stations broadcast on FM frequency 93.1 MHz:

== Argentina ==
- LRI818 Frecuencia Plus in Rosario, Santa Fe
- Radio María in Necochea, Buenos Aires
- Radio María in Las Varillas, Córdoba
- Radio María in Cinco Saltos, Río Negro
- Radio María in San José de Metán, Salta

== Australia ==
- 2WZD in Wagga Wagga, New South Wales
- Radio TAB in Kingaroy, Queensland
- Radio TAB in Stanthorpe, Queensland
- 4RGB in Bundaberg, Queensland
- Magic 93.1 in Renmark, South Australia
- SBS Radio in Melbourne, Victoria
- Real FM in Mudgee, New South Wales

== Canada (Channel 226) ==
- CBF-FM-2 in Magog, Quebec
- CBJ-FM-3 in Dolbeau, Quebec
- CBPN-FM in Golden, British Columbia
- CBRG-FM in Princeton, British Columbia
- CBSI-FM-4 in Labrador City, Newfoundland and Labrador
- CBTY-FM in Lytton, British Columbia
- CFAA-FM in Baie James, Quebec
- CFBD-FM in Baie James, Quebec
- CFBS-FM-1 in Middle Bay, Quebec
- CFBS-FM-2 in Riviere-St-Paul, Quebec
- CFDD-FM in Keyano, Quebec
- CFIS-FM in Prince George, British Columbia
- CFIY-FM in Campbell River, British Columbia
- CFNO-FM in Marathon, Ontario
- CFOB-FM in Fort Frances, Ontario
- CFRG-FM in Gravelbourg, Saskatchewan
- CFRY-1-FM in Portage la Prairie, Manitoba
- CHAY-FM in Barrie, Ontario
- CHIM-FM-5 in Red Deer, Alberta
- CHLQ-FM in Charlottetown, Prince Edward Island
- CHMK-FM in Manouane, Quebec
- CHMT-FM in Timmins, Ontario
- CIFM-FM-8 in Chase, British Columbia
- CIHQ-FM in Champion, Quebec
- CILK-FM-1 in Big White Mountain, British Columbia
- CISE-FM in Wolseley, Saskatchewan
- CJRA-FM in Rainbow Lake, Alberta
- CJRF-FM in Bromptonville, Quebec
- CJTB-FM in Tete-a-la-Baleine, Quebec
- CJXX-FM in Grande Prairie, Alberta
- CKBW-2-FM in Shelburne, Nova Scotia
- CKCU-FM in Ottawa, Ontario
- CKVM-FM in Ville-Marie, Quebec
- CKYE-FM in Vancouver, British Columbia
- VF2474 in Fraser Lake, British Columbia
- VF2543 in Port Hardy, British Columbia

== China ==
- CNR The Voice of China in Qingdao

== Japan ==
- Radio Okinawa in Naha, Okinawa

== Latvia ==
- Latvijas Radio 5 nationwide

== Mexico ==
- XHAAA-FM in Reynosa, Tamaulipas
- XHCCAZ-FM in Zirándaro De Los Chávez, Guerrero
- XHCRA-FM in Álamo-Temapache, Veracruz
- XHCSBN-FM in Monclova, Coahuila
- XHCSV-FM in Coatzacoalcos, Veracruz
- XHCTO-FM in Torreón, Coahuila
- XHEI-FM in San Luis Potosí (Mexquitic de Carmona), San Luis Potosí
- XHEPB-FM in Hermosillo, Sonora
- XHERZ-FM in León, Guanajuato
- XHESJC-FM in San José del Cabo, Baja California Sur
- XHEUH-FM in Tehuacán, Puebla
- XHKQ-FM in Tapachula, Chiapas
- XHLIA-FM in Morelia, Michoacán
- XHMZT-FM in Mazatlán, Sinaloa
- XHNRC-FM in Nueva Rosita, Coahuila
- XHPBJR-FM in San Juan del Río, Querétaro
- XHPEBS-FM in Ciudad Del Carmen, Campeche
- XHPI-FM in Guadalajara, Jalisco
- XHREZ-FM in Tuxtla Gutiérrez, Chiapas
- XHSCKC-FM in San Juan Bautista Tuxtepec, Oaxaca
- XHYI-FM in Cancún, Quintana Roo

== Morocco ==
Radio 2M in Agadir

== Philippines ==
- DWRX in Manila
- DZCL in Tabaco City
- DYWF in Cebu City
- DXAC in Davao City
- DXRX in Zamboanga City

== United Kingdom ==
- BBC Radio 4 in London
- BBC Radio Cymru in Cardiff
- BBC Radio Scotland in Glasgow
- BBC Radio Ulster in Belfast

== United States (Channel 226) ==
- KATO in New Ulm, Minnesota
- KBDZ in Perryville, Missouri
- KBOI-FM in New Plymouth, Idaho
- KCBS in Los Angeles, California
- KFBK in Pollock Pines, California
- KFCW in Riverton, Wyoming
- KFEX-LP in Chanute, Kansas
- KGCX in Sidney, Montana
- KGTC-LP in Oroville, Washington
- KHCU in Concan, Texas
- KHDX in Conway, Arkansas
- KHMY in Pratt, Kansas
- KHRU-LP in Libby, Montana
- KKHJ in Pago Pago, American Samoa
- KKXX in Shafter, California
- KKYA in Yankton, South Dakota
- KLJZ in Yuma, Arizona
- KMCS in Muscatine, Iowa
- KMGJ in Grand Junction, Colorado
- KMKT in Bells, Texas
- KMWB in Captain Cook, Hawaii
- KNHS-LP in Lafayette, Louisiana
- KOOJ-LP in Pittsburg, Kansas
- KOSO in Patterson, California
- KPBC-LP in Childress, Texas
- KPPO in Mapusaga, American Samoa
- KPWS-LP in Manhattan, Montana
- KQID in Alexandria, Louisiana
- KQIZ in Amarillo, Texas
- KQMQ in Honolulu, Hawaii
- KRBH-LP in Red Bluff, California
- KRCS in Sturgis, South Dakota
- KRJN in Log Lane Village, Colorado
- KRVN in Lexington, Nebraska
- KRYP in Gladstone, Oregon
- KSII in El Paso, Texas
- KSLG-FM in Arcata, California
- KSTV-FM in Dublin, Texas
- KTYL in Tyler, Texas
- KVGK in Las Vegas, Nevada
- KWJK in Boonville, Missouri
- KWLB in Red Oak, Oklahoma
- KXSM in Chualar, California
- KZLE in Batesville, Arkansas
- WACV in Coosada, Alabama
- WBBK in Blakely, Georgia
- WCHZ-FM in Warrenton, Georgia
- WDHR in Pikeville, Kentucky
- WDLP-LP in Belding, Michigan
- WEAS in Springfield, Georgia
- WEZW in Wildwood Crest, New Jersey
- WFEZ (FM) in Miami, Florida
- WFGF in Lima, Ohio
- WFGM in Barrackville, West Virginia
- WGAG-LP in Princeton, West Virginia
- WGDQ in Sumrall, Mississippi
- WGMZ in Glencoe, Alabama
- WHBI-LP in Grantville, Pennsylvania
- WHYN in Springfield, Massachusetts
- WIBC (FM) in Indianapolis, Indiana
- WIMK in Iron Mountain, Michigan
- WJBL in Ladysmith, Wisconsin
- WJEH-FM in Racine, Ohio
- WJQM in De Forest, Wisconsin
- WKRO-FM in Port Orange, Florida
- WLEB-LP in Lebanon, Pennsylvania
- WMGX in Portland, Maine
- WMIY-LP in Baton Rouge, Louisiana
- WMKZ in Monticello, Kentucky
- WMPA in Ferrysburg, Michigan
- WMTN-LP in Sewanee, Tennessee
- WMYQ in Shaw, Mississippi
- WNBO-LP in Americus, Georgia
- WNOX in Karns, Tennessee
- WNTQ in Syracuse, New York
- WPAT in Paterson, New Jersey
- WPAW in Winston-Salem, North Carolina
- WPOC in Baltimore, Maryland
- WPQP in Clearfield, Pennsylvania
- WRHJ-LP in Rock Hill, South Carolina
- WSAA in Benton, Tennessee
- WSRD-LP in Albany, Georgia
- WSVO in Staunton, Virginia
- WTFX in Clarksville, Indiana
- WTJS in Alamo, Tennessee
- WTJW-LP in Jasper, Indiana
- WTJX-FM in Charlotte Amalie, U.S. Virgin Islands
- WUCG-LP in Blairsville, Georgia
- WUFL in Detroit, Michigan
- WWKM in Rochelle, Georgia
- WWLB in Ettrick, Virginia
- WWSR in Lima, Ohio
- WXRT in Chicago, Illinois
- WYDS in Decatur, Illinois
- WZAK in Cleveland, Ohio
- WZMJ in Batesburg, South Carolina
