= 1410 AM =

Commercial medium wave broadcast frequency

The following radio stations broadcast on AM frequency 1410 kHz: The Federal Communications Commission classifies 1410 AM as a regional frequency in the United States.

== Argentina ==
- Radio Folclorísimo in José León Suárez, Buenos Aires.
- Radio Fundación in Rafael Calzada, Buenos Aires.

== Canada ==
Call sign	City of license	Daytime power (kW)	Nighttime power (kW)	Transmitter coordinates
CFTE	Vancouver, British Columbia	50	50	49.0925°N 122.9325°W
CJWI	Montreal, Quebec	10	10	45.5644°N 73.6072°W

== Mexico ==
- XEAS-AM in Nuevo Laredo, Tamaulipas
- XEBS-AM in Mexico City
- XEKB-AM in Guadalajara, Jalisco

== United States ==
Call sign	City of license	Facility ID	Class	Daytime power (kW)	Nighttime power (kW)	Unlimited power (kW)	Transmitter coordinates
KBNP	Portland, Oregon	33670	D	5	0.009		45.473333°N 122.66°W
KCAL	Redlands, California	55416	B	2	4		34.068889°N 117.201667°W (daytime); 34.110833°N 117.153056°W (nighttime)
KDBS	Alexandria, Louisiana	32995	D	1	0.028		31.273611°N 92.428611°W
KDKT	Beulah, North Dakota	41175	B	1	0.189		47.2875°N 101.762778°W
KERI	Bakersfield, California	6640	B	1	1		35.351944°N 118.958056°W
KGRN	Grinnell, Iowa	43242	D	0.5	0.047		41.744444°N 92.705833°W
KGSO	Wichita, Kansas	53150	B	5	1		37.734722°N 97.351667°W
KHCH	Huntsville, Texas	30274	D	0.25	0.087		30.715°N 95.528333°W
KIIX	Fort Collins, Colorado	68966	B	1	1		40.592778°N 105.105°W
KITE	Victoria, Texas	27532	B	0.5	0.5		28.778611°N 97.003611°W
KKLO	Leavenworth, Kansas	10345	B	5	0.5		39.273333°N 94.9075°W
KLEM	Le Mars, Iowa	32998	D	1	0.05		42.817778°N 96.163056°W
KLFD	Litchfield, Minnesota	41820	D	0.5	0.045		45.117222°N 94.553611°W
KLVQ	Athens, Texas	38632	D	1	0.139		32.156111°N 95.841944°W
KMYC	Marysville, California	40633	B	5	1		39.138333°N 121.554167°W
KNTX	Bowie, Texas	6561	D	0.5	0.15		33.585556°N 97.806944°W
KOOQ	North Platte, Nebraska	69701	B	5	0.5		41.175°N 100.751944°W
KQV	Pittsburgh, Pennsylvania	8445	D	5	0.075		40.364167°N 79.812778°W
KRML	Carmel, California	73064	D	0.5	0.016		36.536389°N 121.903611°W
KROY	San Saba, Texas	65316	D	0.8	0.203		31.190556°N 98.715278°W
KRWB	Roseau, Minnesota	57076	D	1	0.072		48.845278°N 95.726111°W
KTCS	Fort Smith, Arkansas	5222	D	1	0.13		35.277778°N 94.376389°W
KTNK	Lompoc, California	51263	D	0.5	0.077		34.663056°N 120.382778°W
KWYO	Sheridan, Wyoming	12942	B	5	0.35		44.798333°N 106.930833°W
WCMT	Martin, Tennessee	67054	D	0.7	0.058		36.3625°N 88.849167°W
WDOE	Dunkirk, New York	49209	D	1	0.031		42.463611°N 79.355833°W
WDOV	Dover, Delaware	4670	B	5	5		39.200833°N 75.565278°W
WELM	Elmira, New York	52120	B	5	1		42.119722°N 76.810278°W
WENU	South Glen Falls, New York	3157	D	1	0.103		43.329167°N 73.648333°W
WHAG	Halfway, Maryland	23466	D	1	0.099		39.6175°N 77.738056°W
WHLN	Harlan, Kentucky	54610	D	5	0.041		36.849722°N 83.394722°W
WHTG	Eatontown, New Jersey	72323	D	0.5	0.126		40.269444°N 74.071944°W
WIHM	Taylorville, Illinois	42644	D	1	0.063		39.543889°N 89.275°W
WING	Dayton, Ohio	25039	B	5	5		39.682222°N 84.159167°W
WIZM	La Crosse, Wisconsin	20667	B	5	5		43.846944°N 91.218611°W
WKKP	McDonough, Georgia	26940	D	2.5	0.058		33.429722°N 84.131111°W
WLAQ	Rome, Georgia	14502	B	1	1		34.26°N 85.205278°W
WLSH	Lansford, Pennsylvania	18232	D	5			40.844444°N 75.843611°W
WMYR	Fort Myers, Florida	56984	B	5	5		26.623056°N 81.855°W
WNER	Watertown, New York	71093	D	3.5	0.058		43.946389°N 75.947778°W
WNGL	Mobile, Alabama	854	B	5	4.6		30.706667°N 88.061944°W
WNWZ	Grand Rapids, Michigan	55648	D	1	0.048		42.987222°N 85.623889°W
WPCC	Clinton, South Carolina	36720	D	1	0.1		34.445°N 81.89°W
WPOP	Hartford, Connecticut	37232	B	5	5		41.692778°N 72.751944°W
WQBQ	Leesburg, Florida	73913	D	5	0.088		28.781111°N 81.891667°W
WRJD	Durham, North Carolina	17761	B	5	0.29		36.028889°N 78.85°W
WRMN	Elgin, Illinois	19222	B	1	1.3		42.005833°N 88.298611°W
WRSS	San Sebastian, Puerto Rico	49971	B			1	18.320556°N 66.979167°W
WRTZ	Roanoke, Virginia	73955	D	5	0.072		37.279722°N 79.991389°W
WSCW	South Charleston, West Virginia	12076	D	5			38.376111°N 81.703611°W
WSHY	Lafayette, Indiana	21512	D	1	0.06		40.360556°N 86.877222°W
WVVB	Kingston, Tennessee	52597	D	0.5			35.880278°N 84.515556°W
WYIS	McRae, Georgia	71317	D	1			32.056944°N 82.865556°W
WZZA	Tuscumbia, Alabama	47087	D	0.5	0.051		34.708056°N 87.693056°W

== Uruguay ==
- CX 44 AM Libre in Montevideo
