= KKHJ =

KKHJ may refer to:

- KKHJ-FM, a radio station (93.1 FM) licensed to serve Pago Pago, American Samoa
- KBAD-LD, a low-power television station (UHF 30) licensed to serve Pago Pago, American Samoa, which held the call sign KKHJ-LP from 2008 to 2021 and in 2022

== See also ==
- KHJ (disambiguation)
