= WVUV =

WVUV may refer to:

- WVUV (AM), a defunct radio station (648 AM) formerly licensed to Leone, American Samoa
- WVUV-FM, a radio station (103.1 FM) licensed to Fagaitua, American Samoa
- KBAD-LD, a low-power television station (channel 30) licensed to Pago Pago, American Samoa, which used the call sign WVUV-LP from February 2005 to March 2008
