= KKBT =

KKBT may refer to:

- KKBT (FM), a radio station (104.7 FM) licensed to serve Leone, American Samoa
- KVPP, a radio station (88.9 FM) licensed to serve Pago Pago, American Samoa, which held the call sign KKBT from 2014 to 2019
- KTRY-LP, a defunct low-power television station (channel 39) formerly licensed to serve Pinedale, Wyoming, United States, which held the call sign KKBT-LP from 2007 to 2015
- KKLQ (FM), a radio station (100.3 FM) licensed to serve Los Angeles, California, United States, which held the call sign KKBT from 2000 to 2007
