= XHMM-FM =

Radio station in Mexico City

Simulcast of XEOY-AM 1000
- Mexico City; Mexico
- Frequency: 100.1 MHz
- Branding: Stereo Cien

Programming
- Format: Adult contemporary music in English; newscasts.

Ownership
- Owner: NRM Comunicaciones; (Radio XHMM-FM, S.A. de C.V.)
- Sister stations: XHSON-FM, XEOYE-FM, XEPH-AM, XEBS-AM, XEOY-AM

History
- First air date: 1977; 49 years ago

Technical information
- Licensing authority: CRT
- Class: C
- ERP: 100,000 watts
- HAAT: 484.64 metres (1,590.0 ft)
- Transmitter coordinates: 19°16′09.4″N 99°12′48.0″W

Links
- Webcast: XHMM-FM
- Website: stereociendigital.mx

XHMM-FM (100.1 MHz) is a radio station in Mexico City. It is owned by NRM Comunicaciones and is known as "Stereo Cien". It airs a format of Adult contemporary music in English with newscasts and other talk programs in Spanish.

XHMM-FM is a Class C station with an effective radiated power (ERP) of 100,000 watts.. Its transmitter tower is atop Cerro del Chiquihuite.

== History ==
XHMM signed on in the early 1970s as "Radio Maranatha" after receiving its concession on June 8, 1965. In 1977, the station was acquired by SOMER (Sociedad Mexicana de la Radio), which on July 17 of that year relaunched it as "Stereo Cien." It began airing adult contemporary music in English as well as news and talk programs in Spanish. Since its inception, the station's logo has featured the image of a dolphin, and a dolphin cry is used as an on-air ID. In 1995, SOMER signed a deal with Núcleo Radio Mil to operate and comercially manage the station. SOMER owner Edilberto Huesca would eventually take control of NRM from its founder Guillermo Salas Peyró.

XHMM carries adult contemporary music from the 1980s to the present, and the "Enfoque" newscasts on weekdays. Its online stream plays commercial-free music during the timeslots in which the over-the-air station airs the newscasts, which can be heard on a separate stream.

On June 7, 2021, sister station XEOY-AM 1000 became a full-time simulcast of XHMM.
