= WRHB =

WRHB may refer to:

- WRHB-LP, a low-power radio station (105.9 FM) licensed to serve Mifflinville, Pennsylvania, United States
- WQBQ, a radio station (1410 AM) licensed to serve Leesburg, Florida, United States, which held the call sign WRHB from 2009 to 2010
- WLVJ (AM), a radio station (1020 AM) licensed to serve Kendall, Florida, which held the call sign WRHB from 2001 to 2008
