= KHJ =

KHJ may refer to:

- KHJ (AM), a radio station (930 AM) licensed to Los Angeles, California, United States
- KRTH, a radio station (101.1 FM) licensed to Los Angeles, California, United States, which formerly used the call sign KHJ-FM
- KCAL-TV, a television station (channel 9 analog/43 digital) licensed to Los Angeles, California, United States, which used the call sign KHJ-TV from December 1951 to December 1989
- KKHJ-FM, a radio station (93.1 FM) licensed to Pago Pago, American Samoa, which uses the branding 93 KHJ
- KBAD-LD, a low-power television station (channel 30) licensed to Pago Pago, American Samoa, which used the branding KHJ-TV
- CKHJ (AM), a radio station (1260 AM) licensed to Fredericton, New Brunswick, Canada, which used the branding KHJ until May 2019
- WKHJ (FM), a radio station (104.5 FM) licensed to Mountain Lake Park, Maryland, which uses the branding KHJ
- The IATA airport code for Kauhajoki Airport in Finland
