= KBIB =

- Marion, Texas; United States
- Broadcast area: San Antonio
- Frequency: 1000 kHz

Programming
- Language: Spanish
- Format: Spanish Religious

Ownership
- Owner: Hispanic Community College

Technical information
- Licensing authority: FCC
- Facility ID: 27303
- Class: D
- Power: 250 watts day
- Transmitter coordinates: 29°34′9″N 98°9′47″W

Links
- Public license information: Public file; LMS
- Website: kbibradio.org

KBIB (1000 AM) is a radio station broadcasting a Spanish Religious format. Licensed to Marion, Texas, United States, it serves the San Antonio area. The station is owned by Hispanic Community College.

1000 AM is a United States and Mexican clear-channel frequency; WMVP, KNWN and XEOY share Class A status.
