= WHBI =

WHBI may refer to:

- WHBI-LP, a low-power radio station (93.1 FM) licensed to Grantville, Pennsylvania, United States
- WQXR-FM, a radio station (105.9 FM) licensed to Newark, New Jersey, United States, formerly known as WHBI
