= WBBX =

WBBX may refer to:

- WBBX (FM), a radio station (106.1 FM) licensed to serve Pocomoke City, Maryland, United States
- WVVB (AM), a radio station (1410 AM) licensed to serve Kingston, Tennessee, United States, which held the call sign WBBX from 1985 to 2019
