= WVOI =

WVOI may refer to:

- WVOI (FM), a radio station (91.5 FM) licensed to serve Everglades City, Florida, United States; see List of radio stations in Florida
- WVOI (AM), a defunct radio station (1480 AM) formerly licensed to serve Marco Island, Florida
