= NBC 30 =

NBC 30 may refer to one of the following television stations in the United States:

== Current ==
- WGBC-DT2, a digital channel of WGBC in Meridian, Mississippi
- WSVW-LD in Harrisonburg, Virginia
- WVIT in Hartford / New Britain, Connecticut (O&O)

== Former ==
- WVUV-LP/KBAD-LD in Pago Pago, American Samoa (2005 to 2012)
