= WVVB =

WVVB may refer to:

- WVVB (AM), a radio station (1410 AM) licensed to serve Kingston, Tennessee, United States
- WERC (AM), a radio station (960 AM) licensed to serve Birmingham, Alabama, United States, which used the call sign WVVB in 2011
- WERC-FM, a radio station (105.5 FM) licensed to serve Hoover, Alabama, which used the call sign WVVB from September 2008 to July 2009
