= 660 AM =

AM radio frequency

The following radio stations broadcast on AM frequency 660 kHz: 660 AM is a United States clear-channel frequency. WFAN New York City and KFAR Fairbanks, Alaska, share Class A status of 660 kHz.

== In Argentina ==
- LT41 in Gualeguaychu, Entre Rios

== In Chile ==
- CB-66 in Santiago (Radio UC, formerly Radio Cooperativa, and before 2005 Radio Chilena) - this station was heard across most of Latin America.

== In Colombia ==
- HJQS in Cúcuta
- HJR29 in San Andrés
- HJEZ in Santiago de Cali

== In Mexico ==
- XECPR-AM in Felipe Carrillo Puerto, Quintana Roo
- XEDTL-AM in San Lorenzo Tezonco, Mexico City
- XEFZ-AM in San Nicolás de los Garza, Nuevo León
- XESJC-AM in San José del Cabo, Baja California Sur
- XEYG-AM in Matias Romero, Oaxaca

== In the United States ==
Stations in bold are clear-channel stations.

Call sign	City of license	Facility ID	Class	Daytime power (kW)	Nighttime power (kW)	Unlimited power (kW)	Transmitter coordinates
KAPS	Mount Vernon, Washington	69678	B	10	1		48.438611°N 122.344167°W
KCRO	Omaha, Nebraska	54902	D	1	0.054		41.313056°N 96.01°W
KEYZ	Williston, North Dakota	10511	B	5	5		48.238889°N 103.650278°W
**KFAR**	Fairbanks, Alaska	6438	A			10	64.808056°N 147.492778°W
KGSV	Oildale, California	54760	B	8	6		35.452778°N 118.944444°W
KSKY	Balch Springs, Texas	6591	B	7.2	0.6		33.040833°N 96.9475°W
KTNN	Window Rock, Arizona	66146	B	50	50		35.895°N 109.141389°W
KXOR	Junction City, Oregon	31037	D	10	0.075		44.21°N 123.182222°W
WAMO	Wilkinsburg, Pennsylvania	25732	D	1.4			40.413056°N 79.853889°W
WBHR	Sauk Rapids, Minnesota	26980	B	10	0.5		45.605°N 94.139167°W
WDYZ	Altamonte Springs, Florida	21810	B	3.5	1		28.693056°N 81.349167°W
WESC	Greenville, South Carolina	4678	D	5			34.886111°N 82.4675°W
**WFAN**	New York, New York	28617	A			50	40.859722°N 73.785833°W
WLOY	Rural Retreat, Virginia	27190	D	0.55			36.921389°N 81.242778°W
WMIC	Sandusky, Michigan	59026	D	1			43.392778°N 82.835000°W
WXIC	Waverly, Ohio	14652	D	1			39.130556°N 83.012778°W
WXQW	Fairhope, Alabama	2541	D	10	0.019		30.597222°N 87.882778°W
