= KTCS =

KTCS may refer to:

- KTCS (AM), a radio station (1410 AM) licensed to Fort Smith, Arkansas, United States
- KTCS-FM, a radio station (99.9 FM) licensed to Fort Smith, Arkansas, United States
- Korean Train Control System, a train protection system
- the ICAO code for Truth or Consequences Municipal Airport
