= KBAD-LD =

Low-power TV station in Pago Pago, American Samoa

Currently silent
- Pago Pago; American Samoa
- Channels: Digital: 30 (UHF); Virtual: 30
- Branding: Island Television

Programming
- Affiliations: Independent

Ownership
- Owner: South Seas Broadcasting, Inc.

History
- Founded: 2002
- Former call signs: K30HO (2003–2005); WVUV-LP (2005–2008); KKHJ-LP (2008–2020); KBAD-LP (2020–2022); KKHJ-LP (2022)
- Former channel numbers: Analog: 30 (UHF, 2003–2022)
- Former affiliations: TBN (2002–2005); NBC (2005–2012)

Technical information
- Licensing authority: FCC
- Facility ID: 128905
- ERP: 2 kW
- HAAT: 241.2 m (791 ft)
- Transmitter coordinates: 14°19′3.3″S 170°45′51.2″W

Links
- Public license information: LMS

KBAD-LD (channel 30) is a low-power television station in Pago Pago, American Samoa, serving the U.S. territory. It is owned by South Seas Broadcasting alongside WVUV-FM, KKBT-FM and KKHJ-FM. KBAD-LD's transmitter is located between A'oloau and Mapusaga.

The station is presently silent.

== History ==
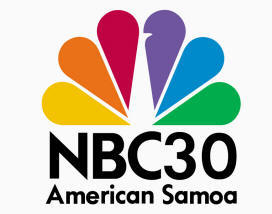
Logo used until 2012

The station was founded on November 4, 2003, as TBN repeater K30HO.

In 2005, it was acquired by South Seas Broadcasting. It changed its call sign to WVUV-LP on March 21, 2005, after its acquisition by South Seas Broadcasting; however, it branded itself as "KHJ-TV". It was the first privately owned television station and, later, network affiliate, in American Samoa; network service up to this time on the island had been provided by channels of the government-owned KVZK-TV. Even though the station was located on a Pacific island, it had originally taken a call sign beginning with "W". Co-owned WVUV had been established during World War II and was "grandfathered" with a W-call, and the FCC allowed co-owned channel 30 to use it as well. WVUV-LP had the distinction of being the furthest west television station with a "W" call sign in the United States and the only "W" television call sign in the Pacific. In 2012, KKHJ-LP dropped NBC (which returned to the KVZK fold in 2014) and relaunched as an independent station, taking on the branding name of "Island Television".

On March 11, 2008, the station changed its call sign to KKHJ-LP, reflecting its branding. The call letters were changed again to KBAD-LP on May 21, 2020.

KBAD-LP's license was canceled by the FCC on August 4, 2021, due to the station not being licensed to convert to digital operation by the July 13, 2021 deadline. South Seas Broadcasting requested reinstatement and tolling of its conversion to digital television because of COVID-19–related lockdowns that prevented commercial airline flights and were not lifted until 2022, which the FCC granted with a new July 11, 2022, deadline to finish construction. The call sign reverted to KKHJ-LP on June 16, 2022.

The station was licensed for digital operation effective August 29, 2022, changing its call sign to KBAD-LD.

== See also ==
- Communications in American Samoa
