= WRIS =

WRIS may refer to:

- WRIS-FM, a radio station (106.7 FM) licensed to Mount Horeb, Wisconsin
- WRTZ, a radio station (1410 AM) licensed to Roanoke, Virginia which used the call letters WRIS from 1953–2013
- WRIS, a process that studies the wheel/rail-interface in detail to develop an optimised wheel/rail-combination adapted to the customer's network developed by the dynamics department of Bombardier Transportation GmbH in Siegen (Germany) by Bombardier Transportation GmbH, now acquired by Alstom.
