= WXIC =

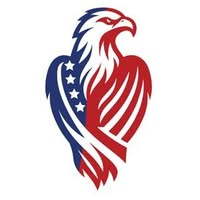
- Waverly, Ohio; United States
- Broadcast area: South-Central Ohio
- Frequency: 660 kHz
- Branding: The Eagle

Programming
- Format: Conservative talk
- Affiliations: Fox News Radio

Ownership
- Owner: Total Media Group

History
- First air date: July 11, 1954 (as 1380 WPKO)
- Former call signs: WPKO (1954-?)

Technical information
- Licensing authority: FCC
- Facility ID: 14652
- Class: D
- Power: 1,000 watts days only
- Transmitter coordinates: 39°7′50.00″N 83°0′46.00″W
- Translator: 95.9 W240DZ (Waverly)

Links
- Public license information: Public file; LMS
- Webcast: Listen Live
- Website: WXIC Online

WXIC (660 AM) is a commercial radio station licensed to Waverly, Ohio, calling itself "The Eagle". It airs a conservative talk radio format and is owned by Total Media Group, Inc. News updates are supplied by Fox News Radio .

By day, WXIC is powered at 1,000 watts using a non-directional antenna. But because 660 AM is a clear channel frequency reserved for Class A WFAN New York City, WXIC is a daytimer and must sign off at night to avoid interference. WXIC's signal covers South-Central Ohio and parts of Kentucky and West Virginia.

== History ==
In 1954, the station first signed on as WPKO at 1380 kHz. It originally was a country music station with some Southern Gospel music on Sundays. In 1971, it added an FM sister station at 100.9, playing automated beautiful music. Today that is co-owned WXIZ, a country music station. In recent years, the station has added an FM translator, also broadcasting on 95.9 FM. On September 17, 2024, the station dropped the Gospel format, transitioning to sports talk, rebranding themselves as "The Game".

The WPKO call sign is now being used at an FM station in Bellefontaine, Ohio.

In September 2024, WXIC changed their format from gospel to sports, branded as "The Game".

In February 2026, WXIC changed their format from sports to conservative talk, branded as "The Eagle".
