= Mount Olotele =

Mountain in American Samoa, United States

Coordinates: 14°19′03″S 170°45′51″W

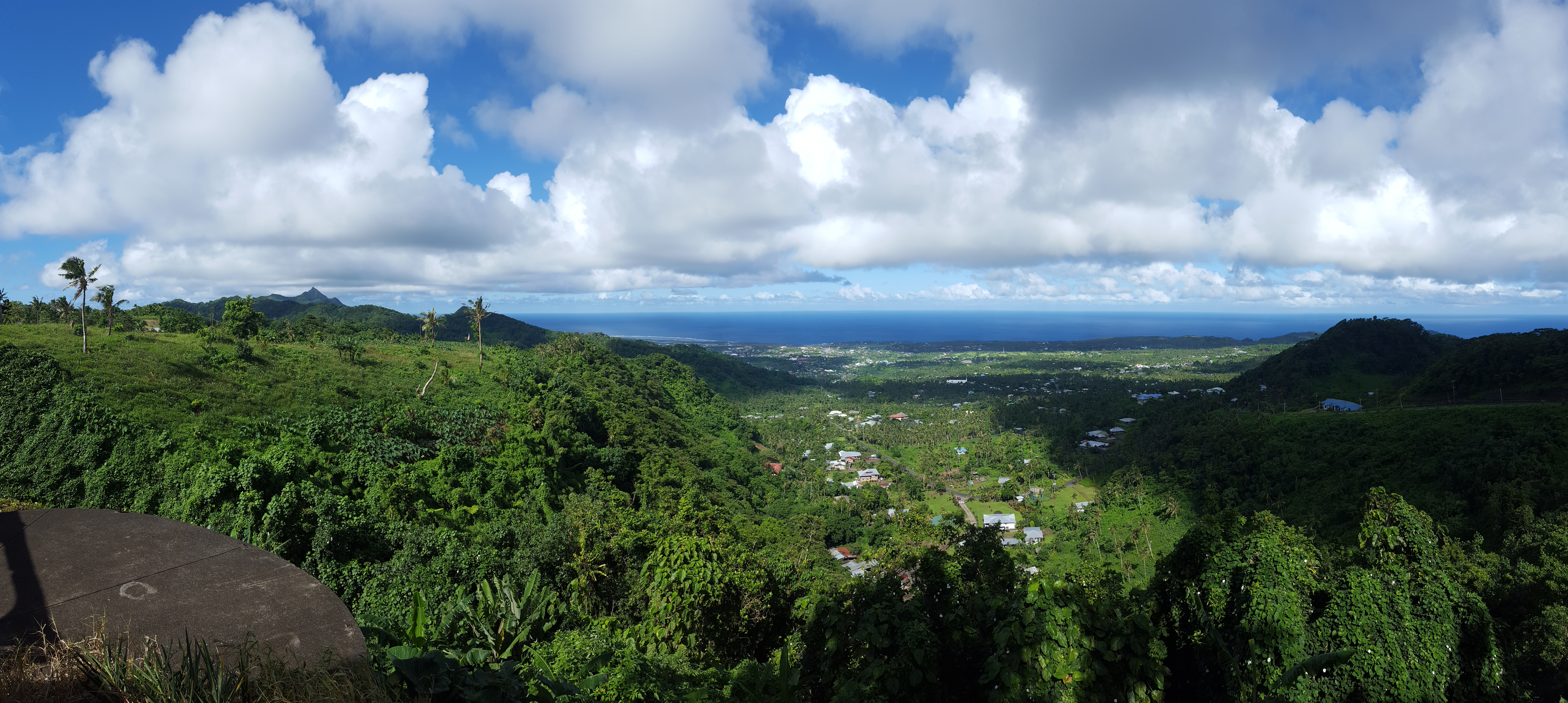
View from Mount Olotele

Mount Olotele, also referred to as Olotele Mountain, is a 493-meter (1,617-foot) peak in the Western District of Tutuila Island in American Sāmoa. It is the highest peak on the western part of Tutuila Island.

Several villages lie on Mount Olotele, which is shared by Mapusagafou on the lower slopes and A‘oloau at the higher elevations. Deep within the lush, rainforested terrain of Mapusagafou is the Le Fale‘o Cultural Center, offering visitors an immersive experience of traditional arts, cooking, and customs. At A‘oloau, there is a botanical garden established by the Department of Tourism. Near the mountaintop, the village of A‘asufou sits at an elevation of 1,340 feet above sea level.

From A‘oloaufou, a hike leads to the Olotele Towers at 493 meters above sea level, which offer views. On clear days, the summit of Mount Olotele offers 270-degree vistas that stretch across the island—reaching as far as Aunu‘u Island to the southeast and encompassing Tutuila's south shore villages. From this vantage point, visitors can also spot landmarks like Rainmaker Mountain, Matafao Mountain, the Tafuna-Leone Plain, and the South Pacific Ocean.

From Mount Olotele, a network of downhill trails connects to the villages of A‘asutuai, A‘oloautuai, and Fagamalo.

== Settlements ==
=== Aʻoloau ===
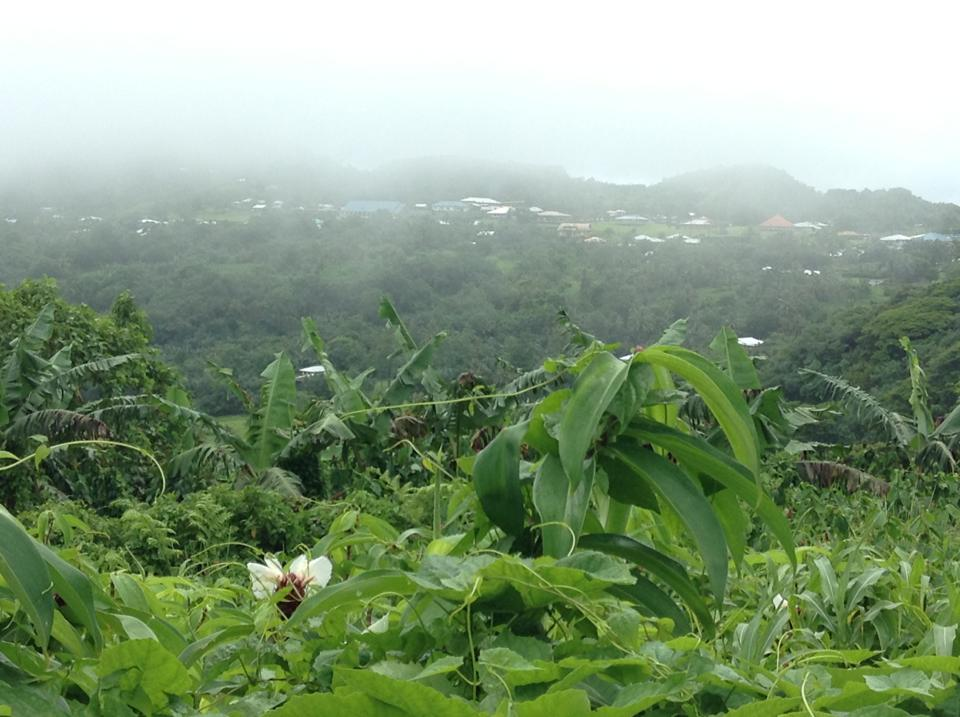
View of Aʻoloaufou

Located at the summit of Mount Olotele, the village of A‘oloaufou stands as the highest settlement on Tutuila Island. Positioned just across the main road from Aʻasu, it enjoys a notably cool climate year-round—an effect of its lofty elevation. On overcast days, fog often drapes the mountain, underscoring why the village's symbol is the Puaolele (flying cloud). Mount Olotele itself is home to both private and government antennas — known locally as the Olotele Towers — and offers sweeping views that extend to Tutuila's south shore villages as well as Aunu‘u Island in the southeast. Historically, A‘oloau was situated along the low-lying north shore; that original coastal site, A‘oloau Tuai (Old A‘oloau), can still be reached via a hiking trail from A‘oloaufou. Rugged terrain and strong sea currents once made both land and ocean travel challenging, yet the men of Old A‘oloau were revered as skilled fishermen. Following the relocation to Mount Olotele some eighty years ago, the community shifted its focus to livestock and farming. Today, A‘oloau's fertile highlands have become a vital source of agricultural staples for Tutuila Island.

During the early 1940s, World War II brought extensive changes to Tutuila, including the construction of new roads—among them the route leading to A‘oloau. Village leaders seized this opportunity to relocate to the flat terrain atop Mount Olotele, a move long under consideration and seen as especially advantageous for younger generations. By the decade's end, most residents had settled in the higher elevations. Today, it remains a cherished tradition for families to visit the original coastal settlement — A‘oloau Tuai — to share ancestral folklore and stories with the next generation.

=== Aʻasu ===
Much like A‘oloau, the village of A‘asu was originally located on the northern coast at Massacre Bay. However, after a hurricane destroyed the main road in 1979, residents chose to move inland along the newly constructed route near Mount Olotele. The former coastal site became known as A‘asutuai (Old Town A‘asu), while the newly established settlement in the highlands was called A‘asufou, meaning “New A‘asu.”

== Trails ==
From the summit of Mount Olotele, hikers can venture down to both A‘asutuai and Aʻoloautuai. The trail descending to A‘asu at Massacre Bay often becomes muddy and typically takes about an hour each way. A‘asutuai can only be reached on foot. An adventurous 2.5-mile (4.0 km) trail begins just east of a botanical garden established by the Department of Tourism on Mount Olotele, descending toward the beach and monument in A‘asutuai. The path, composed mainly of volcanic clay, can turn muddy, waxy, and slippery when wet. Hikers have the option to camp at A‘asu village before making the return journey up to A‘oloaufou. There is also a trail leading to Fagamalo.

As you head west, the Massacre Bay trailhead is on the right near the boundary between Aʻasu and Aʻoloau. A bit farther, near the end of the road in Aʻoloau, is the trailhead for Old Aʻoloau (Aʻoloautuai).

== Geology ==
The unconsolidated ash and cinder deposits from Olotele Mountain to Larsen Bay offer valuable geological insight into the region's formative processes. These deposits are critical for understanding volcanic eruptions and lava flows that have shaped Tutuila Island. Mount Olotele is notable for its cinder cone, where interbedded lava flows and weathered layers create conditions that trap small bodies of perched water.
