= XEBS-AM =

Radio station in Mexico City

Simulcast of XEPH-AM 590
- Mexico City; Mexico
- Broadcast area: Greater Mexico City
- Frequency: 1410 kHz
- Branding: Sabrosita

Programming
- Format: Tropical music

Ownership
- Owner: NRM Comunicaciones; (Hispano Mexicano, S.A. de C.V.)
- Sister stations: XHSON-FM, XHMM-FM, XEOYE-FM, XEOY-AM, XEPH-AM

History
- First air date: 1937

Technical information
- Licensing authority: CRT
- Class: B
- Power: 25 kWs day 10 kW night
- Transmitter coordinates: 19°23′19.5″N 99°07′30.1″W

XEBS-AM is a radio station based in Mexico City on 1410 kHz. The station is owned by NRM Comunicaciones and simulcasts the programming of sister station XEPH-AM 590, with the tropical format Sabrosita.

== History ==
Logo used as La Más Perrona until 2016

XEBS-AM is among Mexico City's most stable radio stations, maintaining the same callsign, frequency and concessionaire throughout its history. It signed on in 1937 as "Vocero Hispano-Mexicano" but did not receive its first concession until 1943. In 1953, with the goal of offering rural music to a rapidly expanding Mexico City area, the station took on the name "Radio Sinfonola" — which it would continue with for the next 51 years, until becoming grupera-formatted "La Más Perrona" in 2004. The station had begun airing a daily hour-long program with music by Pedro Infante in 1952, which lasted for 61 uninterrupted years, being controversially cancelled in January 2013. The cancellation of the Pedro Infante program resulted in a loss of audience and the resignation of longtime host and director Gustavo Alvite.

XEBS-FM, started in 1961, originally broadcast on 89.7 FM but was moved to 100.9 FM. That station, still owned by NRM, is now XHSON-FM "Beat 100.9".

In 2016, the La Más Perrona name was jettisoned as part of a relaunch of the station, with a new name, Bandolera, being instituted.

On December 1, 2022 Bandolera stopped broadcasting on 1410 kHz, and NRM began simulcasting the Sabrosita programming of XEPH-AM 590 on the frequency.
