= XEOYE-FM =

Contemporary hit radio station in Mexico City

- Mexico City; Mexico
- Broadcast area: Greater Mexico City
- Frequency: 89.7 MHz
- Branding: Oye 89.7

Programming
- Language: Spanish
- Format: Contemporary hit radio; Latin pop; reggaeton

Ownership
- Owner: NRM Comunicaciones; (Radio Proyección, S.A. de C.V.)
- Sister stations: XHMM-FM, XHSON-FM, XEPH-AM, XEBS-AM, XEOY-AM

History
- First air date: August 28, 1957
- Call sign meaning: OYE ("Listen" in Spanish; also a modification of previous XEOY callsign)

Technical information
- Licensing authority: CRT
- Class: C
- ERP: 100 kW
- HAAT: 484.64 meters (1,590.0 ft)
- Transmitter coordinates: 19°31′54.2″N 99°07′47.7″W

Links
- Webcast: Listen live
- Website: oyedigital.mx/

XEOYE-FM is a radio station in Mexico City. Located on 89.7 FM, XEOYE-FM is a pop-formatted radio station owned by NRM Comunicaciones and branded as Oye 89.7. The transmitter site is located atop Cerro del Chiquihuite.

== History ==
XEOYE-FM is Mexico City's oldest surviving FM radio station, on air since August 28, 1957. It started its life as XEBS-FM, later switching callsigns with 100.9 FM to become XEOY-FM. It started with a classical music format, known as "Estéreomil", that remained on air for 39 years. The station was among the first in Mexico to operate regularly in stereo.

After nearly four decades, on July 29, 1994, XEOY-FM became Morena F.M., an early ranchera and ballad music format. In January 2000, NRM briefly allied with MVS Radio, which resulted in 89.7 FM taking on the FM Globo format when MVS's 104.9 FM became Exa FM; on July 15, 2002, this was ditched to become pop-formatted Oye 89.7. The station's callsign was changed to XEOYE-FM as part of the rebrand.
