= WCNZ =

- Marco Island, Florida; United States
- Broadcast area: Naples–Florida Keys
- Frequency: 1660 kHz
- Branding: Relevant Radio

Programming
- Format: Catholic–talk radio
- Network: Relevant Radio

Ownership
- Owner: Relevant Radio, Inc.
- Sister stations: WMYR

History
- First air date: June 1999
- Former call signs: WMIB (1998–2002)

Technical information
- Licensing authority: FCC
- Facility ID: 86909
- Class: B
- Power: 10,000 watts (day); 1,000 watts (night)
- Transmitter coordinates: 25°59′30″N 81°37′30″W
- Translator: 93.3 W227DX (Naples)

Links
- Public license information: Public file; LMS
- Webcast: Listen live
- Website: www.relevantradio.com

WCNZ (1660 AM) is a radio station broadcasting a Catholic–talk radio format as an affiliate of Relevant Radio. Licensed to Marco Island, Florida, United States, it serves the Naples area. The station is owned by Relevant Radio, Inc.

== History ==
WCNZ originated as the expanded band "twin" of an existing station on the standard AM band. On March 17, 1997, the Federal Communications Commission (FCC) announced that 88 stations had been given permission to move to newly available "Expanded Band" transmitting frequencies, ranging from 1610 to 1700 kHz, with WODX in Marco Island authorized to move from 1480 to 1660 kHz.

The FCC's initial policy was that both the original station and its expanded band counterpart could operate simultaneously for up to five years, after which owners would have to turn in one of the two licenses, depending on whether they preferred the new assignment or elected to remain on the original frequency. However, this deadline was extended multiple times, and both stations continued to be authorized until AM 1480, now WVOI, was deleted on June 3, 2021.

The new station on 1660 AM was assigned the call sign WMIB on February 17, 1998; in June 1999, it signed on simulcasting ABC Radio Networks' adult standards format with WODX. On January 18, 2002, the station changed its call sign to WCNZ.

In February 2009, WCNZ and its simulcast sister, WMYR (1410 AM) in Fort Myers, changed from Catholic programming to Scott Shannon "True Oldies Channel". In the fall of that same year, WMYR/WCNZ changed to a "Timeless Cool" format branded as "The Avenue". The Florida Everblades ice hockey team signed a deal with The Avenue to carry the team's games for the 2010–2011 season. On April 1, 2013, WCNZ and WMYR changed their format to classic country.

WCNZ switched to a religious format, "Ardiente Radio", in April 2014. In November 2016, the station was observed identifying as part of the Relevant Radio network.
