= XHSON-FM =

Radio station in Mexico City

- Mexico City; Mexico
- Broadcast area: Mexico City area
- Frequency: 100.9 MHz
- Branding: Beat

Programming
- Format: EDM

Ownership
- Owner: NRM Comunicaciones; (Televideo, S.A. de C.V.)
- Sister stations: XHMM-FM, XEOYE-FM, XEPH-AM, XEBS-AM, XEOY-AM

History
- First air date: April 18, 1968; 58 years ago
- Former call signs: XEBS-FM (1968–1978); XHROK-FM (1994–1996)
- Call sign meaning: From original station name Sonomil

Technical information
- Licensing authority: CRT
- Class: C
- ERP: 100 kW
- HAAT: 484.64 metres (1,590.0 ft)
- Transmitter coordinates: 19°16′09.4″N 99°12′48.0″W

Links
- Website: beatdigital.mx

XHSON-FM (100.9 FM) is a commercial radio station in Mexico City, owned and operated by NRM Comunicaciones. It has an electronic dance music (EDM) format under the name "Beat 100.9".

XHSON-FM is a Class C station with an effective radiated power (ERP) of 100,000 watts. The transmitter is atop Cerro del Chiquihuite.

== History ==
The history of 100.9 FM in Mexico City begins with Televideo, S.A., receiving a concession for XEOY-FM in 1957. However, the station didn't sign on the air until April 18, 1968; 58 years ago. The original call sign was XEBS-FM, using the moniker "La Chica Musical". In the mid-1970s, the station became known as "Sonomil" (a name derived both from its position at 100.9 FM and from XEOY-AM 1000). This name was referred to in the station's call letters when it became XHSON-FM in 1978.

The format moved toward album rock in 1983 and 1984. The station took the name "Proyecto 101" on September 1, 1983 and then Rock 101 on June 1, 1984. The call sign changed to XHROK-FM in 1994.

On August 16, 1996, due to low ratings and changes within Núcleo Radio Mil, management decided to flip formats. It became "Código 100.9" with techno EDM music. The call sign returned to XHSON-FM.

On April 24, 1999, the Sabrosita tropical music format moved to 100.9 FM from XEPH-AM 590.

On October 1, 2004, XHSON was relaunched as "Beat 100.9" with a new EDM format.
