= XEPH-AM =

Radio station in Mexico City

Simulcast of XEBS-AM 1410
- Mexico City; Mexico
- Broadcast area: Greater Mexico City
- Frequency: 590 kHz
- Branding: Sabrosita

Programming
- Format: Tropical music

Ownership
- Owner: NRM Comunicaciones; (Compañia Mexicana de Radiodifusión, S.A. de C.V.)
- Sister stations: XHSON-FM, XHMM-FM, XEOYE-FM, XEOY-AM, XEBS-AM

History
- First air date: October 1, 1942

Technical information
- Licensing authority: CRT
- Class: B
- Power: 25 kW day 10 kW night
- Transmitter coordinates: 19°23′19.5″N 99°07′30.1″W

Links
- Website: sabrositadigital.mx

XEPH-AM is a radio station in Mexico City. Broadcasting on 590 AM, XEPH-AM is owned by NRM Comunicaciones and broadcasts a tropical music format under the brand name Sabrosita.

== History ==
The XEPH concession was awarded in November 1940, with the station coming to air in 1942.

After moving in a rock direction for years, in August 1967, the station became rock-formatted "La Pantera" (The Panther). In 1987, the station became Spanish modern rock-formatted Espacio 59, only to go back to 1960s and 1970s rock in December 1989. In 1990, XEPH became rock-formatted "Radio Alicia", and from 1992 to 1995, it became "X-Press Radio 590" with an English-language news and music format, similar to Radio VIP.

1995 saw the creation of Sabrosita, which moved to XHSON-FM 100.9 in 1999 to make way for a return of La Pantera to 590. In 2002, La Pantera was replaced again, this time with a sports radio format as Estadio 590; the next year, Estadio 590 gave way to romantic music-formatted Tuya 590.

In 2004, with the creation of the current Beat 100.9 dance music format, Sabrosita returned to 590 AM.

NRM ceased separate programming of XEBS-AM 1410 on December 1, 2022, and brought the two stations together as a simulcast known as Sabrosita 590 y 1410.
