= XHCSV-FM =

Radio station in Coatzacoalcos, Veracruz, Mexico

XHCSV-FM / XECSV-AM
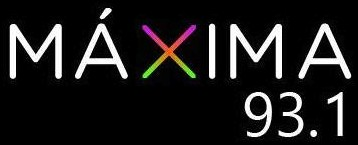
- Coatzacoalcos, Veracruz; Mexico
- Frequencies: 93.1 FM; 1000 AM
- Branding: Máxima

Programming
- Format: Contemporary hit radio

Ownership
- Owner: Radio S.A.; (Radio Mil de Veracruz, S.A. de C.V.)

History
- First air date: 1994 (FM); November 8, 1988 (AM)
- Call sign meaning: CoatzacoalcoS, Veracruz"

Technical information
- Licensing authority: CRT
- Class: B1 (FM); C (AM)
- Power: 1 kW
- ERP: 10 kW
- HAAT: 117.70 m

Links
- Website: maxplay.com.mx

XHCSV-FM 93.1/XECSV-AM 1000 is a combo radio station in Coatzacoalcos, Veracruz, Mexico. It is known as Máxima and carries a contemporary hit radio format.

== History ==
The concession for 1000 AM was awarded in 1988. The FM station was added in 1994.

The tower used by the FM in the Benito Juárez Norte area of Coatzacoalcos failed in high winds on February 4, 2022.
