= XHESJC-FM =

Rado station in San José del Cabo, Baja California Sur, Mexico

XHESJC-FM/XESJC-AM
- San Jose del Cabo, Baja California Sur; Mexico
- Frequency: 93.1 FM / 660 AM
- Branding: Kvoz

Programming
- Format: Regional Mexican

Ownership
- Owner: Promomedios California; (Raúl Antonio Arechiga Espinoza)

History
- First air date: May 8, 1995 (concession)
- Call sign meaning: San José del Cabo

Technical information
- Licensing authority: CRT
- Class: B1 (FM); B (AM)
- Power: 2,500 watts day/0,250 watts Night
- ERP: 25 kW
- HAAT: 52.1 m (171 ft)
- Transmitter coordinates: 23°04′20″N 109°39′56″W

Links
- Webcast: Listen live
- Website: kvoz.com

XHESJC-FM/XESJC-AM is a radio station on 93.1 FM and 660 AM in San José del Cabo, Baja California Sur, Mexico.

== History ==
XESJC-AM 660 received its concession on May 8, 1995. It was authorized to move to FM in February 2011.
