= WVUV (AM) =

Radio station in Leone, American Samoa (1942–2011)

Leone, American Samoa; American Samoa
- Broadcast area: American Samoa, Samoa, Tonga, Niue, Fiji, Kiribati, Tuvalu, and Nauru
- Frequency: 648 kHz

Programming
- Format: Defunct

Ownership
- Owner: South Seas Broadcasting, Inc.
- Sister stations: KKHJ-FM, KKHJ-LP, WVUV-FM

History
- First air date: 1942
- Last air date: 2011

Technical information
- Facility ID: 54768
- Class: B
- Power: 10,000 watts (unlimited)
- Transmitter coordinates: 14°21′28″S 170°46′36″W

WVUV (648 AM) was a radio station licensed to serve the community of Leone, American Samoa. The station, established in 1942, was owned and operated by South Seas Broadcasting, Inc., when its broadcast license was cancelled in 2011. WVUV was a sister station to NBC TV station KKHJ-LP, which went by the WVUV-LP callsign until 2008.

== Programming ==
Before signing off forever, WVUV broadcast a hot adult contemporary music format to American Samoa area and other neighboring islands.

== History ==
After being deleted from the FCC database in January 2005 after a period of inactivity, the station was re-licensed and reassigned the callsign WVUV by the Federal Communications Commission on May 5, 2006. The FCC application history shows a series of "Stay Silent" requests from February 2006 through 2008, as the station's antenna was damaged and the station was unable to repair it.

The station filed an application with the FCC to change broadcast frequencies from 648 kHz to 720 kHz. This would have included a reduction in power from 10,000 watts day and night to 5,000 watts during the day and 2,000 watts at night. The antenna would also have moved to 14°20'23"S, 170°46'21"W.

The WVUV broadcast license was due for periodic renewal on April 16, 2010. Per FCC regulations, the station should have applied for renewal no later than December 16, 2009. As the FCC had received no request to renew the license for nearly a year after its scheduled expiration, the Commission declared the license expired, ordered WVUV to cease broadcasting, and deleted the WVUV call sign from its database.
