= KKLO =

- Leavenworth, Kansas; United States
- Broadcast area: Kansas City metropolitan area
- Frequency: 1410 kHz
- Branding: Radio Vida

Programming
- Format: Spanish-language Christian radio

Ownership
- Owner: Radio Vida Kansas, Inc.

Technical information
- Class: B
- Power: 5,000 watts days 500 watts nights
- Transmitter coordinates: 39°16′24″N 94°54′27″W
- Translator: 92.7 K224FF (Lenexa)

Links
- Webcast: Listen Live
- Website: RadioVida.com

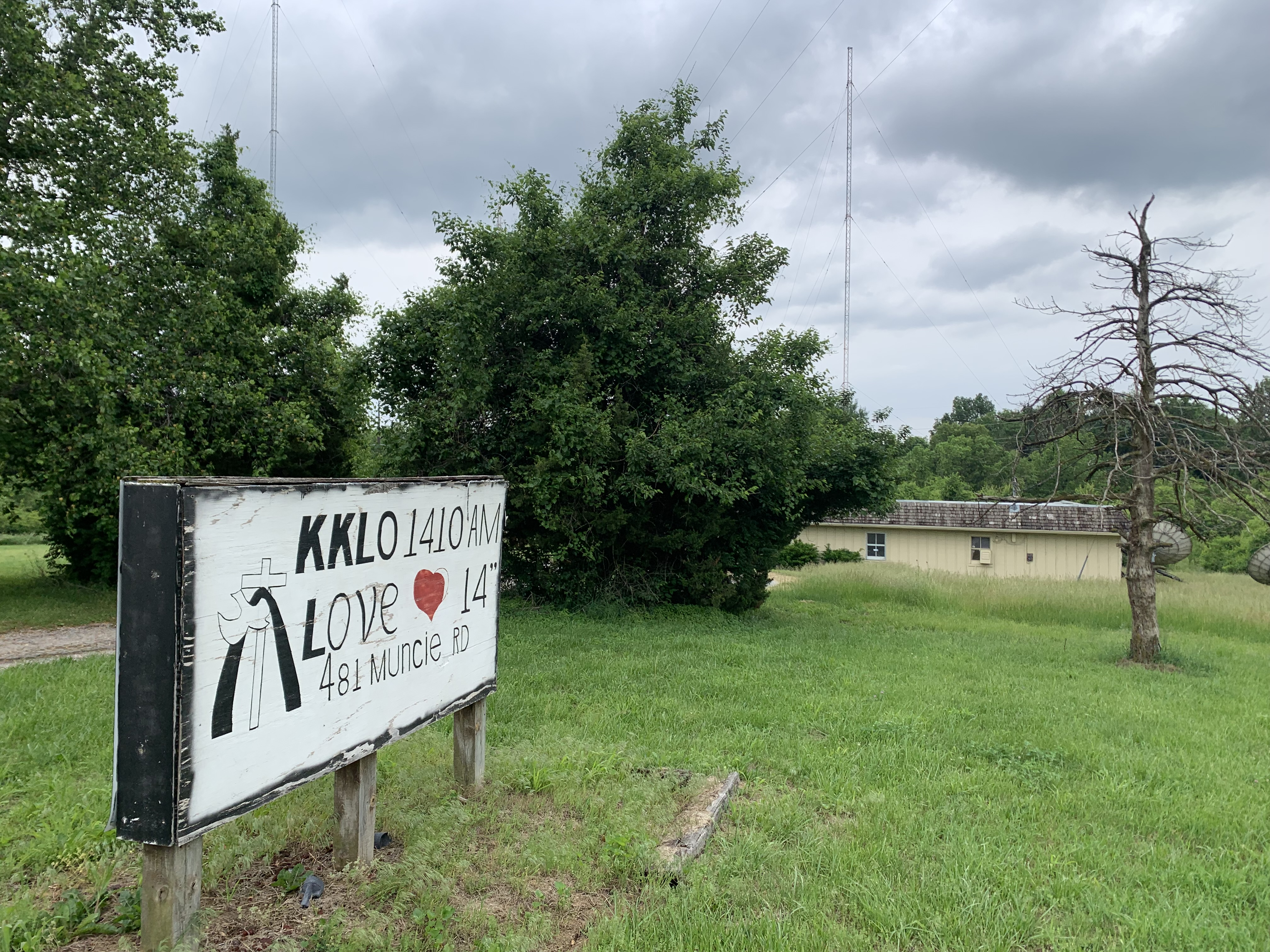
KKLO 1410AM radio station in Leavenworth, Kansas

KKLO (1410 kHz) is a commercial AM radio station licensed to Leavenworth, Kansas, and serving the Kansas City metropolitan area. It broadcasts a Spanish-language Christian radio format and is owned by Radio Vida Kansas, Inc. The station is non-commercial and seeks donations on the air and on its website.

By day, KKLO broadcasts with 5,000 watts, but to protect other stations on 1410 kHz from interference, at night it reduces power to 500 watts. It uses a directional antenna with a three-tower array. The transmitter is on the corner of Muncie Road at Hughes Road in Leavenworth. Programming is also heard on 99-watt FM translator K224FF at 92.7 MHz in Lenexa, Kansas.

== History ==
KKLO's logo from its time as a Fox-affiliated Talk Radio station.

The station first signed on the air in 1948 with the call sign KCLO, and was a daytimer, meaning it signed off at night. It was owned by Leavenworth Broadcasting Company and operated with 1,000 watts of power, carrying a general programming format The call sign was changed from KCLO to KCKN in 1962, and it briefly used the call sign KCKP in the early 1990s.The call sign KKLO was adopted in 1993. The station was sold to the Leavenworth Road Baptist Church in 1994. During this era, KCKN was one of the Kansas City area's most popular Country Western music outlets, a format it maintained through the 1980s. After the sale to the Leavenworth Road Baptist Church in 1994, the station adopted its current religious programming format, often simulcasting KCXL.

In 1968, it added an FM sister station, 98.1 KKLO-FM (today KMBZ-FM). In the 1980s, KKLO 1410 received authorization to broadcast around the clock.
