= XHLIA-FM =

Radio station in Morelia, Michoacán

- Morelia, Michoacán; Mexico
- Frequency: 93.1 FM
- Branding: Grupera 93.1

Programming
- Format: Regional Mexican

Ownership
- Owner: Radio S.A.; (Carlos de Jesús Quiñones Armendáriz)
- Sister stations: XHI-FM

History
- First air date: February 24, 1993 (concession)
- Call sign meaning: Last three letters of Morelia

Technical information
- ERP: 25 kW
- HAAT: 269.455 meters
- Transmitter coordinates: 19°43′21.27″N 101°16′20.59″W

Links
- Webcast: Listen live
- Website: maxplay.com.mx

XHLIA-FM is a radio station on 93.1 FM in Morelia, Michoacán. It is owned by Radio S.A. and carries its Regional Mexican format.

== History ==
XELIA-AM 1140 received its concession on February 24, 1993. It was owned by Radiorama and broadcast as a 250-watt daytimer. Carlos de Jesús Quiñones acquired the station in 2012.

XELIA was cleared to move to FM in 2012. Originally slated for 103.3 MHz, XHLIA-FM was moved to 93.1 MHz in September 2013, and the next year the IFT awarded a new station, XHMICH-FM, on 103.3 instead. An additional modification, allowing for the station to be moved to a mountain site, was approved in 2017.
