= KPPO =

Radio station in Mapusaga, American Samoa

Mapusaga, American Samoa; American Samoa
- Frequency: 90.5 MHz

Programming
- Language: English
- Format: Religious

Ownership
- Owner: Second Samoan Congregational Church of Long Beach

Technical information
- Licensing authority: FCC
- Facility ID: 173754
- Class: C3
- ERP: 750 watts
- HAAT: 492 meters (1,614 ft)
- Transmitter coordinates: 14°19′3″S 170°45′51″W

Links
- Public license information: Public file; LMS
- Webcast: KPPO Listen Live

KPPO (90.5 FM) is a non-commercial radio station licensed to serve the community of Mapusaga, a village on Tutuila island in the American territory of American Samoa. The station's broadcast license, issued in December 2011, is held by the Second Samoan Congregational Church of Long Beach. KPPO broadcasts a religious radio format.

== History ==
In October 2007, the Second Samoan Congregational Church of Long Beach applied to the Federal Communications Commission (FCC) for a construction permit for a new broadcast radio station. The U.S. Federal Communications Commission granted this permit on January 12, 2009, with a scheduled expiration date of January 12, 2012. The new station was assigned call sign "KPPO" on May 12, 2009. After construction and testing were completed in December 2011, the station was granted its broadcast license on December 7, 2011.
