= Aʻoloau, American Samoa =

Aʻoloau
- Village
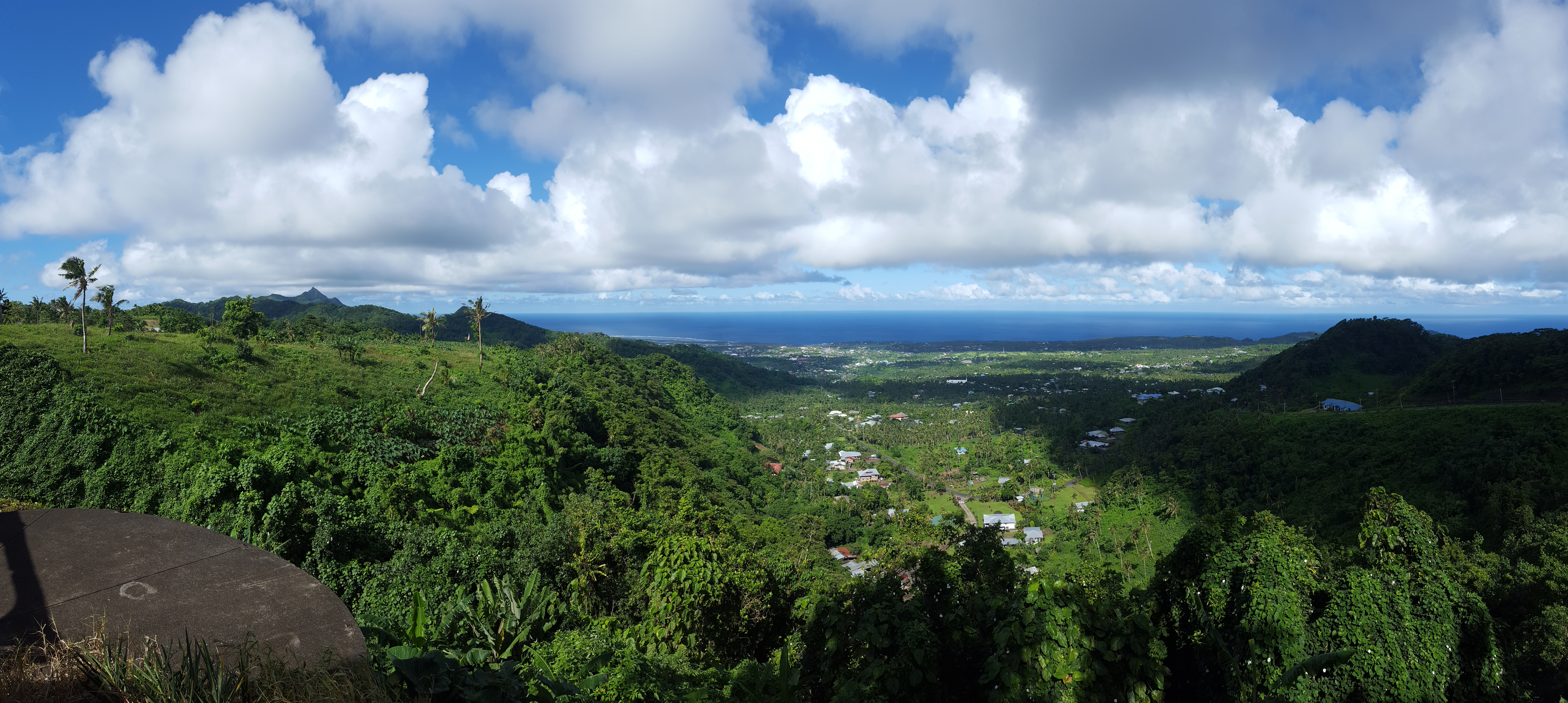
- Panorama from Aʻoloau, facing south
- Etymology: Samoan: "to row with the sea current"
- Nicknames: "Nuu Saumalu" (fog village), "Puaolele" (flying cloud)
- Location within American Samoa
- Coordinates: 14°19′11″S 170°46′12″W
- Country: United States
- Territory: American Samoa
- County: Leasina

Government
  - Mayor: Sape Taugola

Area
  - Total: 2.5 sq mi (6.5 km^{2})
- Elevation: 1,339 ft (408 m)

Population (2020)
  - Total: 650
  - Density: 260/sq mi (100/km^{2})
- Time zone: UTC−11 (Samoa Time Zone)
- ZIP code: 96799
- Area code: +1 684

Aʻoloau is a village in the west of Tutuila Island, American Samoa. It is located inland, 5 miles (8 km) southwest of Pago Pago. It is also known as Aʻoloaufou, which means "New Aʻolou". An abandoned area in town by Aʻoloau Bay is known as Aʻoloautuai, which means "Old Aʻoloau". Aʻoloau's nickname is Nuu Puaolele which means the Fog Village.

The village is reached from a road near Shins Mart in the village of Pavaʻiaʻi. It sits inland, high on the central plain of Tutuila. It has an elevation of 1,340 ft (410 m). A hiking trail from Aʻoloaufou leads down to Old Aʻasu on Massacre Bay. Aʻasu was the site where Frenchman Jean-François de Galaup, comte de Lapérouse visited in 1787. Lapérouse explored and mapped the various Samoan Islands when he arrived in Aʻasu on December 11, 1787. A battle broke out between the French and the native Samoans, and several French and Samoans were killed.

== Etymology ==
Aʻoloau, which is pronounced A-olo-au, translates as "to row with the sea current". Its origin traces to an open-sea experience of the ancestors. The word Aʻoloau emanates from the daily activity of boat-rowing in the open sea in order to sustain life and for transportation. Before major developments in the early 1940s, the village was located in the low-lying coastal areas on the north shores. This settlement is referred to as Aʻoloau Tuai (Old Aʻoloau).

== History ==
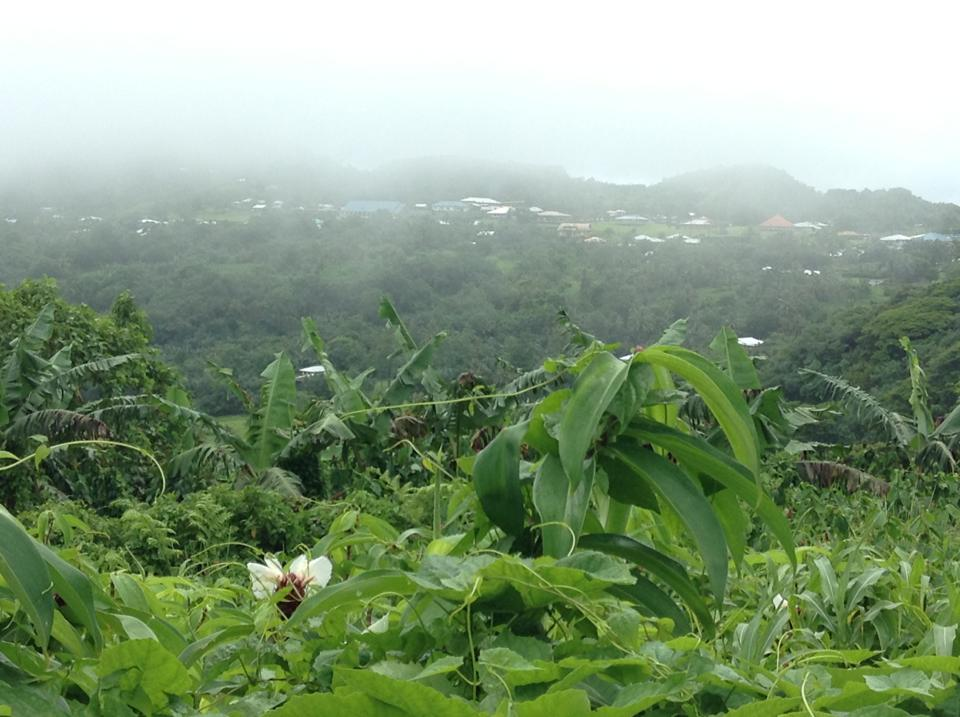
Aʻoloau on top of Mount Olotele

Aʻoloau Tuai (Old Aʻoloau) is separated from the more populated villages on Tutuila's south coast, and transportation to and from the village was difficult. Ocean and land transportation were equally difficult due to the rugged terrain surrounding the village as well as the rough sea currents facing its forefront. The men of Aʻoloau Tuai were among the best fishermen on the island; however, after the village moved to the Mount Olotele mountaintop eighty years ago, they raised livestock and became skilled farmers. Since then, Aʻoloau farms have become reliable sources of food staples for Tutuila Island.

During World War II, a communication and radar station was constructed atop Tutuila’s central mountain spine at Mount Olotele. This project required clearing a square mile of land on the mountain plateau and building a long, winding road from Mapusaga to the site. Initially, the Olotele Radar Station was accessed via a tramway from the parking area at the end of Olotele Road. Facilities for the personnel included three quarters structures, a mess hall, and a latrine to support those managing the power house and radar equipment.

In the early 1940s, major changes happened throughout Tutuila as a result of World War II. Public roads were mapped and constructed, including the road to Aʻoloau. Village leaders took heed of this opportunity to make the move, which had been discussed for years. The move to the flat land on top of Mount Olotele was the best decision, particularly for the younger generations. By the end of the decade, most residents had moved to the mountaintop. It has become a tradition for villagers to visit their original settlement to share the village folklore and tales with the children.

After the closure of the Olotele Radar Station, High Chief Fuimaono and the matai of Aʻoloau relocated from their constrained coastal settlement to the expansive area on Mount Olotele. By 1960, this new village, situated at an altitude of over 1,000 feet, featured sixteen guest fales representing the sixteen aiga (families) of the community. The fales were arranged in a line nearly a mile long, overlooking a grassy malae and the main road. At the village's center stood a flagpole and a concrete schoolhouse. Behind each fale were living and working quarters for the families, with latrines located deeper into the surrounding forest. High Chief Fuimaono of Leasina County often highlighted the health and vitality of the village children, attributing it to the excellent sanitation and the refreshing high-altitude climate.

== Geography ==
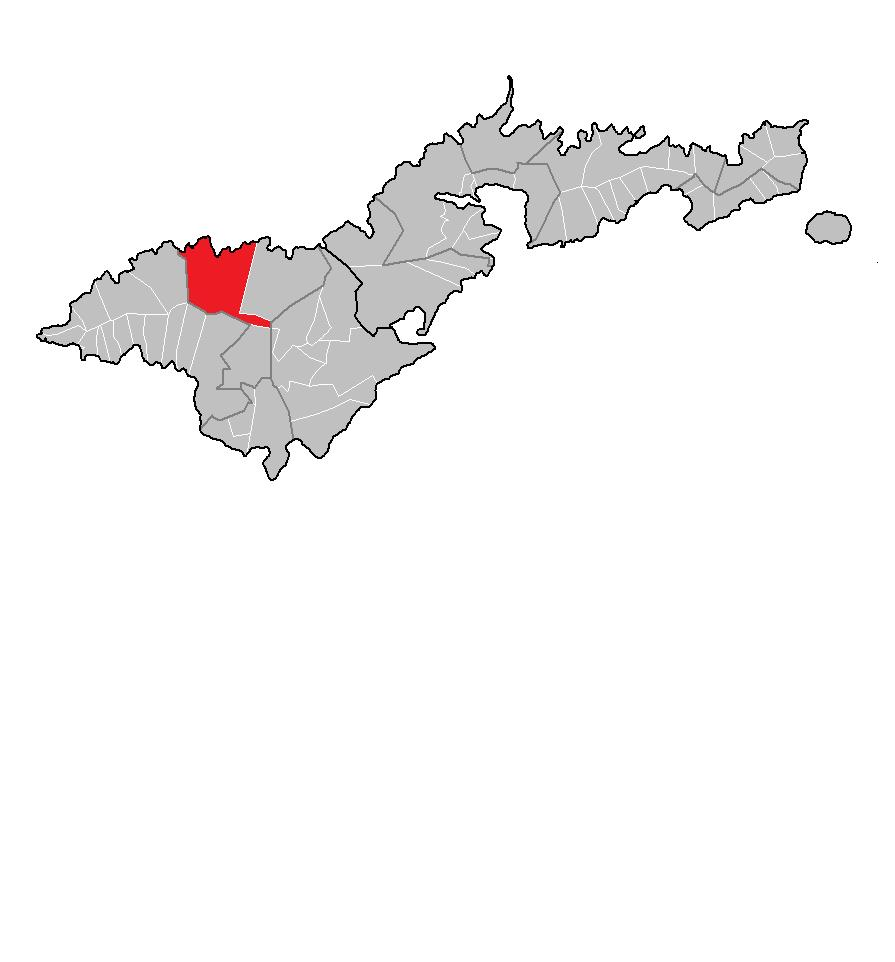
Location on Tutuila Island.

Aʻoloau is a village on the top of Mount Olotele. It is the highest village settlement on Tutuila Island. Its strategic location provides a view of the entire island, even as far as Aunuʻu Island on clear days. The village is 12 miles (19 km) from Pago Pago. It is uniquely located on the opposite side of the main road from Aasu village. Due to its high elevation, Aoloau's climate is cool throughout the year compared to most Tutuila communities. The village is covered by fog on cloudy days. The village icon is the Puaolele (flying cloud). Mount Olotele is the location of private and government antennas and satellite dishes. From the mountain, you can see as far as to south shore villages on Tutuila and Aunuʻu Island to the southeastern part of Tutuila. On top of the steep rise is panoramic 270-degree views of valleys, Rainmaker Mountain, Matafao Mountain, Tafuna Plain, and as far as the Pacific Ocean.

== Demographics ==
Year	Population
2020	650
2010	615
2000	778
1990	544
1980	398
1970	336
1960	262
1950	143
1940	129
1930	114

Aʻoloau was home to 615 people as of the 2010 U.S. Census. According to the 2000 U.S. Census, the population was 778 and 53 percent of the village population were males. Both Censuses found more than fifty percent of the population to be at the age of fifty or younger.

== Massacre Bay Trail ==
Aʻoloaufou is home to a hiking trail which leads to the village of Aasu. Aasu is a historic village where, on December 11, 1787, twelve men from the Lapérouse ships Boussole and Astrolabe and 39 Samoans were killed in a battle. Aasu is a near-abandoned village which is home to just a few families. Aasu village has no road outlet, and can only be reached by hiking trails.

The trail from Aʻoloaufou takes off downhill just east of a colorful garden which was created by Department of Tourism. It is a 2.5-mile (4.0 km) trail which leads to the beach and monument in Aasu. The trail down is mostly made of volcanic clay which may be muddy, waxy and treacherous when wet. It is possible to camp at Aasu village before returning to Aʻoloaufou. Other trails in Aʻoloaufou includes a trail to the abandoned village of Aʻoloautuai, as well as another trail leading down the ridge to the village of Fagamalo.

== Education ==
Village leaders have been successful in getting the American Samoa Government to construct an elementary school in the village, in order to serve the children of Aʻasu and Aʻoloau villages. The school is situated on a hillside above the church. High school students attend Leone High School. Many of the village's youth and young adults serve in the U.S. Army and work in the American Samoa government.
