= WVOI (AM) =

Radio station in Marco Island, Florida

- Marco Island, Florida; United States
- Frequency: 1480 kHz

Programming
- Format: Catholic radio
- Network: Relevant Radio

Ownership
- Owner: Relevant Radio, Inc.
- Sister stations: WMYR; WCNZ

History
- First air date: January 1975
- Last air date: January 21, 2020
- Former call signs: WRGI (1975–1978); WMIB (1978–1984); WWWO (1984–1985); WMIB (1985–1993); WODX (1993–2002)
- Former frequencies: 1510 kHz
- Call sign meaning: "Voice of the Islands"

Technical information
- Facility ID: 13980
- Class: B
- Power: 1,000 watts
- Transmitter coordinates: 25°59′30″N 81°37′30″W

WVOI (1480 AM) was a radio station that broadcast a Catholic radio format. Licensed to serve Marco Island, Florida, United States, the station was last owned by Relevant Radio, Inc. It broadcast between 1975 and 2020 and was the first radio station on Marco Island.

== History ==
The station went on the air as WRGI in January 1975 as Marco Island's first radio station. It was owned by Collier Broadcasting Company and aired a contemporary hit radio format.

In 1978, WRGI became WMIB (promoted as "Wonderful Music Is Back") and changed to a big band music format, playing music of the 1930s and 1940s. Arkelian Broadcasting acquired WMIB from Collier in 1983; after a brief stint as WWWO from 1984 to 1985, Arkelian sold it to Teiwes Broadcasting at the end of 1986. Teiwes sold WMIB, which had gone silent, to WCOO general manager Terry Lee Trunzo's Marco Island Broadcasting for $70,000 in 1992.

WMIB lost its transmitter tower when Hurricane Andrew passed over Marco Island in 1992. After the tower collapse, WMIB was sold to Cos-Star Broadcasting Corporation for $47,000; principal Patrick Costa owned WNNW in Salem, New Hampshire. The new owner revived the station with the Jones Satellite Network's oldies programming as WODX on August 6, 1993. The oldies format remained until a format flip to sports talk in 1996.

=== Expanded band assignment ===
On March 17, 1997, the Federal Communications Commission (FCC) announced that 88 stations had been given permission to move to newly available "expanded band" transmitting frequencies, ranging from 1610 to 1700 kHz, with WODX authorized to move from 1480 to 1660 kHz.

On February 17, 1998, the new expanded band station on 1660 AM—also on Marco Island—was assigned the call letters WMIB, under which it signed on in June 1999; the call sign was changed to WCNZ on January 18, 2002. The FCC's initial policy was that both the original station and its expanded band counterpart could operate simultaneously for up to five years, after which owners would have to turn in one of the two licenses, depending on whether they preferred the new assignment or elected to remain on the original frequency. However, this deadline was extended multiple times, and both stations continued to be authorized for 23 years.

The stations simulcast, having returned to adult standards, until 2000. That year, a lease-to-buy deal under which Richard and Kathy Storm ran the station ended after the Storms opted not to buy WODX and WMIB from Cos-Star Broadcasting. Two years later, a Collier County jury awarded them $225,000 after the Storms sued Cos-Star for poor record keeping, FCC violations, and power problems on the expanded-band frequency, finding that Cos-Star had breached its time brokerage and option agreements.

=== Later history ===
When the Storms deal collapsed, Cos-Star moved operations off Marco Island and to a facility in East Naples, and the station was sold to All Financial Network. That group aired its talk programs on the 1660 frequency and adult standards on 1480.

The call letters changed one last time on July 3, 2002, to WVOI, representing the "Voice of the Islands". The format changed again to local talk in 2003.

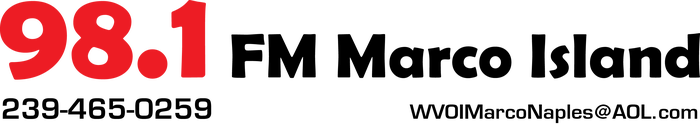
Logo as "98FM Marco Island"

In 2013, WVOI, WCNZ and WMYR in Fort Myers became a simulcast network with a classic country format, dropping standards. By 2016, it was airing an adult contemporary format as 98FM Marco Island, named for its FM translator at the time, W251BL. That year, Starboard Media, then-owner of Relevant Radio, acquired the three stations from Almodovar Media Corporation, which had defaulted on its promissory note to the previous ownership.

On January 21, 2020, a fire destroyed the WVOI transmitter site; the station never returned. As a result of being off the air for over a year, WVOI's license was deleted on June 3, 2021.
