= WMYR =

Relevant Radio station in Fort Myers, Florida

- Fort Myers, Florida; United States
- Broadcast area: Lee County, Florida
- Frequency: 1410 kHz

Programming
- Language: English
- Format: Catholic radio
- Network: Relevant Radio

Ownership
- Owner: Relevant Radio, Inc.
- Sister stations: WCNZ

History
- First air date: November 11, 1952
- Call sign meaning: Fort Myers

Technical information
- Licensing authority: FCC
- Facility ID: 56984
- Class: B
- Power: 5,000 watts
- Transmitter coordinates: 26°37′23″N 81°51′18″W
- Translator: 106.7 W294AN (Fort Myers Beach)

Links
- Public license information: Public file; LMS
- Webcast: Listen live
- Website: relevantradio.com

WMYR (1410 kHz) is a commercial AM radio station broadcasting a Catholic radio format, as part of the Relevant Radio network. Licensed to Fort Myers, Florida, it serves the Lee County area. The station is owned by Relevant Radio, Inc.

WMYR broadcasts at 5,000 watts around the clock, although at night, the station uses a directional antenna to protect other stations on 1410 AM. WMYR's programming can also be heard on an FM translator, 106.7 W294AN in Fort Myers Beach. The studios and offices are on Collier Center Way in Naples and the 1410 transmitter is off Hylands Circle in Fort Myers. The programming is also simulcasted in the Naples area on WCNZ (1660 AM).

== History ==
WMYR first signed on the air on November 11, 1952. It spent most of the 1970s and early 1980s as a Top 40 station.

On October 27, 2000, WMYR began airing the Radio Disney children's network. The format was dropped on February 14, 2005. In February 2009, WMYR its simulcast WCNZ changed from Catholic programming to the Scott Shannon's "True Oldies Channel". In the fall of that same year, WMYR/WCNZ changed to the "Timeless Cool" format branded as "The Avenue".

On April 1, 2013, WMYR flipped to classic country, branding itself "Original Classic Country 1410". The web site said it was "The first station to bring Elvis to town, before he was a superstar. We are proud to bring back the great music of Waylon Jennings, Willie Nelson, Johnny Cash, Dolly Parton and Reba McEntire....along with new classic country artists like Alan Jackson, Toby Keith, Kenny Chesney and Tim McGraw".

When WMYR acquired its FM translator, it rebranded itself as "Twang 106.7" to reflect the translator's frequency.

== Translator ==
Call sign	Frequency	City of license	FID	ERP (W)	Class	FCC info
W294AN	106.7 FM	Fort Myers Beach, Florida	139046	250	D	LMS
