= 1000 AM =

AM radio frequency

The following radio stations broadcast on AM frequency 1000 kHz:

1000 AM is a United States and Mexican clear-channel frequency. KNWN Seattle, WMVP Chicago and XEOY Mexico City share Class A status on 1000 kHz.

== Argentina ==
- LT42 Del Iberá in Mercedes, Corriente
- LU16 Rio Negro in Villa Regina, Río Negro
- Sintonia in José C Paz, Buenos Aires.

== Brazil ==
- Rádio Record in São Paulo

== Chile ==
- CB100 at Santiago

== Mexico ==
Stations in bold are clear-channel stations.

- XECSV-AM in Coatzacoalcos, Veracruz
- XEFV-AM in Ciudad Juarez, Chihuahua
- XEGQ-AM in Los Reyes de Salgado, Michoacán
- XEMYL-AM in Mérida, Yucatán
- **XEOY-AM** in Mexico City - 50 kW daytime, 20 kW nighttime, transmitter located at 19.388333°N 99.124722°W
- XETAC-AM in El Sacrificio (Tapachula), Chiapas

== United States ==
Stations in bold are clear-channel stations.

| Call sign | City of license | Facility ID | Class | Daytime power (kW) | Nighttime power (kW) | Critical hours power (kW) | Transmitter coordinates |
|---|---|---|---|---|---|---|---|
| KBIB | Marion, Texas | 27303 | D | 0.25 | | | 29.569167°N 98.163056°W |
| KCEO | Vista, California | 67666 | B | 10 | 0.97 | | 33.232778°N 117.269722°W |
| KFLG | Bullhead City, Arizona | 65676 | D | 1 | | | 35.169444°N 114.633889°W |
| KKIM | Albuquerque, New Mexico | 25524 | D | 10 | 0.053 | | 35.051111°N 106.642778°W |
| **KNWN** | Seattle, Washington | 21647 | A | 50 | 50 | | 47.463611°N 122.440833°W |
| KSOO | Sioux Falls, South Dakota | 61322 | D | 10 | 0.1 | | 43.486944°N 96.596667°W |
| KTOK | Oklahoma City, Oklahoma | 11925 | B | 5.8 | 5.8 | | 35.358056°N 97.463333°W |
| WABQ | Parma, Ohio | 25522 | D | 0.5 | | | 41.319722°N 81.768611°W |
| WCMX | Leominster, Massachusetts | 54850 | D | 1 | | | 42.523611°N 71.735278°W |
| WDJL | Huntsville, Alabama | 23088 | D | 1.1 | | | 34.779722°N 86.654444°W |
| WGVY | Altavista, Virginia | 21415 | D | 1 | | | 37.122222°N 79.288889°W |
| WHNY | Paris, Tennessee | 4805 | D | 5 | | 2.5 | 36.313889°N 88.2925°W |
| WIOO | Carlisle, Pennsylvania | 72985 | D | 15 | | 2.7 | 40.158333°N 77.196944°W |
| WJBW | Jupiter, Florida | 32963 | D | 0.65 | 0.017 | | 26.938889°N 80.116667°W |
| WJNZ | Robertsdale, Alabama | 50377 | D | 1 | | | 30.536944°N 87.705°W |
| WKLF | Clanton, Alabama | 61222 | D | 1 | | | 32.831944°N 86.693333°W |
| WLNL | Horseheads, New York | 37481 | D | 5 | | 2.5 | 42.153889°N 76.846389°W |
| **WMVP** | Chicago, Illinois | 73303 | A | 50 | 37 | | 41.818056°N 87.988333°W |
| WRTG | Garner, North Carolina | 9072 | D | 1 | | | 35.730556°N 78.603333°W |
| WVWI | Charlotte Amalie, Virgin Islands | 66976 | B | 5 | 1 | | 18.336389°N 64.944722°W |
| WXTN | Benton, Mississippi | 27486 | D | 5 | | | 33.110833°N 90.039167°W |
| WYBT | Blountstown, Florida | 5891 | D | 5 | | | 30.454167°N 85.042222°W |
