= WRTZ =

- Roanoke, Virginia; United States
- Broadcast area: Roanoke metropolitan area
- Frequency: 1410 kHz
- Branding: True Oldies WRTZ

Programming
- Language: English
- Format: Oldies
- Affiliations: The True Oldies Channel; Virginia News Network

Ownership
- Owner: Metromark Media, LC

History
- First air date: February 28, 1953; 73 years ago
- Former call signs: WRIS (1953–2013)
- Call sign meaning: Roanoke True Oldies

Technical information
- Licensing authority: FCC
- Facility ID: 73955
- Class: D
- Power: 5,000 watts (day); 72 watts (night)
- Transmitter coordinates: 37°16′47.0″N 79°59′29.0″W

Links
- Public license information: Public file; LMS

WRTZ (1410 AM) is a commercial radio station licensed to Roanoke, Virginia. WRTZ is owned and operated by Metromark Media, LC. It broadcasts an oldies radio format supplied by The True Oldies Channel. It plays the hits of the 1960s, 70s and 80s, hosted by Scott Shannon and other disc jockeys.

By day, WRTZ is powered at 5,000 watts non-directional, to protect other stations on 1410 AM from interference at night, it greatly reduces power to 72 watts. Its transmitter is on Luckett Street NW in Roanoke.

== History ==
The station signed on the air as WRIS on February 28, 1953. It was originally a daytimer station, required to go off the air at night. In the 1970s, it was a full service, middle of the road station, broadcasting popular adult music, news and sports. It was a network affiliate of the Mutual Broadcasting System.
