= CJRF-FM =

Catholic radio station in Brompton, Quebec, Canada

Coordinates: 45°28′28″N 71°56′44″W

- Brompton, Sherbrooke, Quebec; Canada
- Frequency: 93.1 MHz

Programming
- Language: French
- Format: Catholic radio

Ownership
- Owner: Fabrique de la Paroisse de Sainte-Praxède-de-Bromptonville

History
- Former frequencies: 1995–2004

Technical information
- Class: LP
- ERP: 1 watt
- HAAT: −30 metres (−98 ft)

CJRF-FM (93.1 MHz) is a Canadian FM radio station in the Estrie region of Quebec, owned by La Fabrique de la Paroisse de Sainte-Praxède-de-Bromptonville. The station airs a francophone Catholic religious radio format, and is officially licensed to the Sherbrooke arrondissement of Brompton.

The station was licensed by the CRTC on November 6, 1995, originally broadcasting at 89.5 MHz. In 2004, the station changed its frequency to its current 93.1 MHz frequency.
