= KAPS =

- Mount Vernon, Washington; United States
- Frequency: 660 kHz
- Branding: The New KAPS Country

Programming
- Format: Country music
- Affiliations: Westwood One

Ownership
- Owner: J & J Broadcasting, Inc.

History
- First air date: April 17, 1963
- Former frequencies: 1470 kHz

Technical information
- Licensing authority: FCC
- Facility ID: 69678
- Class: B
- Power: 10,000 watts day; 1,000 watts night
- Transmitter coordinates: 48°26′18.4″N 122°20′43.6″W
- Translator: 102.1 K271AH (Mount Vernon)

Links
- Public license information: Public file; LMS
- Webcast: Listen Live
- Website: www.kapsradio.com

KAPS (660 AM) is a radio station broadcasting a country music format to the Mount Vernon, Washington, United States, area. The station is owned by J & J Broadcasting, Inc. and features programming from Westwood One. The signal reaches many parts of Skagit County, as far north as Vancouver, BC, and as far south as Lynnwood and Edmonds at times. KAPS was formerly owned by Totem Broadcasters, Inc. with George B. Aller, owner and President, who sold the station in 1979. It also operates a translator station simulcasting its signal on 102.1 FM, K271AH.
