= WRHJ-LP =

- Rock Hill, South Carolina; United States
- Frequency: 93.1 MHz

Programming
- Format: Religious
- Affiliations: Fundamental Broadcasting Network; IRN/USA Radio News

Ownership
- Owner: Southside Baptist Church

Technical information
- Licensing authority: FCC
- Facility ID: 132312
- Class: L1
- ERP: 35 watts
- HAAT: 50.0 meters (164.0 ft)
- Transmitter coordinates: 34°54′23″N 80°58′45″W

Links
- Public license information: LMS
- Website: southsidebaptistrh.org

WRHJ-LP (93.1 FM) was a low-power radio station broadcasting a religious format. Licensed to Rock Hill, South Carolina, United States, the station was last owned by Southside Baptist Church and features programming from the Fundamental Broadcasting Network.
