= WMKZ =

- Monticello, Kentucky; United States
- Frequency: 93.1 MHz
- Branding: Z93 Country

Programming
- Format: Country music
- Affiliations: CNN Radio, Westwood One

Ownership
- Owner: Monticello-Wayne County Media, Inc.

History
- Former call signs: WPFC (1990–1990)

Technical information
- Licensing authority: FCC
- Facility ID: 43654
- Class: A
- ERP: 1,450 watts
- HAAT: 206.0 meters
- Transmitter coordinates: 36°48′29″N 84°50′46″W

Links
- Public license information: Public file; LMS
- Webcast: no
- Website: wmkz.com

WMKZ (93.1 FM) is a radio station broadcasting a country music format. Licensed to Monticello, Kentucky, United States. The station is currently owned by Monticello-Wayne County Media, Inc. and features programming Westwood One.

== History ==
The station went on the air as WPFC on February 21, 1990. On March 2 of that year, the station changed its call sign to the current WMKZ.
