= KRBH-LP =

- Red Bluff, California; United States
- Broadcast area: Red Bluff, California
- Frequency: 93.1 MHz

Programming
- Format: Rock and pop

Ownership
- Owner: Red Bluff Joint Union High School District

Technical information
- Licensing authority: FCC
- Facility ID: 124306
- Class: L1
- ERP: 100 watts
- HAAT: −20.7 meters (−68 ft)
- Transmitter coordinates: 40°10′34″N 122°15′0″W

Links
- Public license information: LMS

KRBH-LP (93.1 FM) is a high school radio station broadcasting a rock and pop format. Licensed to Red Bluff, California, United States, the station serves the Red Bluff area. The station is currently owned by Red Bluff Joint Union High School District. The radio station has been operating for 60 years as of 2026
