= KGTC-LP =

- Oroville, Washington; United States
- Frequency: 93.1 MHz
- Branding: KGTC 93.1 FM

Programming
- Format: Religious

Ownership
- Owner: Ruth's House of Hope

Technical information
- Licensing authority: FCC
- Facility ID: 134798
- Class: L1
- ERP: 100 watts
- HAAT: 0.0 meters (0 ft)
- Transmitter coordinates: 48°56′6″N 119°26′8″W

Links
- Public license information: LMS
- Website: kgtcradio.com

KGTC-LP (93.1 FM, "KGTC 93.1 FM") is a radio station broadcasting a religious format. Licensed to Oroville, Washington, United States, the station is currently owned by Ruth's House of Hope.
