= KNTX =

- Bowie, Texas; United States
- Broadcast area: Montague County, Texas
- Frequency: 1410 kHz
- Branding: KNTX 97.3

Programming
- Format: Oldies–full-service radio
- Affiliations: ABC News Radio; CBS News Radio; Cumulus Media Networks; Texas State Network

Ownership
- Owner: Henderson Broadcasting Company, LP

History
- First air date: May 29, 1959; 66 years ago
- Former call signs: KBAN (1959–1988); KRJT (1988–2000)
- Call sign meaning: North Texas

Technical information
- Licensing authority: FCC
- Facility ID: 6561
- Class: D
- Power: 500 watts (day); 150 watts (night)
- Transmitter coordinates: 33°35′0″N 97°48′25″W
- Translator: 97.3 K247CW (Bowie)

Links
- Public license information: Public file; LMS
- Webcast: Listen live
- Website: kntxradio.com

KNTX (1410 AM) is a radio station licensed in and serving the Bowie, Texas area with full-service radio and oldies programming. It is under ownership of Henderson Broadcasting Company, LP. Much of the schedule consists of news headlines from ABC News, CBS News, and the Texas State Network with the rest of the schedule filled with community news and classic hits from Cumulus Media Networks' "Classic Hits" satellite feed.

The station was assigned the KNTX call sign by the Federal Communications Commission on February 1, 2000.

Former logo
