= WUCG-LP =

- Blairsville, Georgia; United States
- Broadcast area: Blairsville, Georgia; Union County, Georgia
- Frequency: 93.1 MHz
- Branding: G93

Programming
- Format: country, Southern gospel, bluegrass
- Affiliations: Feature Story News

Ownership
- Owner: The Missionary Quartermaster, Inc.

History
- First air date: July 4, 2014
- Call sign meaning: Union County, Georgia

Technical information
- Licensing authority: FCC
- Facility ID: 195227
- Class: L1
- ERP: 100 watts
- HAAT: 17.4 meters (57 ft)
- Transmitter coordinates: 34°49′19.70″N 84°0′54.70″W

Links
- Public license information: LMS
- Webcast: WUCG-LP Webstream
- Website: WUCG-LP Online

WUCG-LP is a country, Southern gospel and bluegrass music formatted broadcast radio station licensed to Blairsville, Georgia, USA, serving Blairsville and Union County, Georgia. It is owned and operated by The Missionary Quartermaster, Inc.
