= KLFD =

- Litchfield, Minnesota; United States
- Broadcast area: St. Cloud, Minnesota
- Frequency: 1410 kHz
- Branding: The Original

Programming
- Format: Variety

Ownership
- Owner: Mid-Minnesota Media, LLC

History
- First air date: 1959
- Former call signs: KLFD (1959-1989); KQIV (1989–1991)
- Call sign meaning: LitchFielD

Technical information
- Licensing authority: FCC
- Facility ID: 41820
- Class: D
- Power: 500 watts (day); 45 watts (night)
- Transmitter coordinates: 45°07′02″N 94°33′13″W
- Translators: W240DD (95.9 MHz, Litchfield)

Links
- Public license information: Public file; LMS
- Website: klfd1410.com

KLFD (1410 AM, "The Original") is a radio station licensed to serve Litchfield, Minnesota, United States. The station's broadcast license is held by Mid-Minnesota Media, LLC.

KLFD broadcasts a "variety" format featuring an assortment of news, sports, informational, and talk radio programming plus a full-service mix of music and information on weekdays. This programming also includes the Voice of Tomorrow religious broadcast and the Imagination Theater syndicated radio drama series. The station provides play-by-play coverage for the Litchfield Dragons and Dassel-Cokato Chargers high school teams. The station is an affiliate for the Minnesota Vikings (NFL) and the Minnesota Lynx (WNBA). It also serves as a broadcast partner for the Minnesota Golden Gophers and the Minnesota Wild.

== History ==
KLFD began broadcasting on April 20, 1959. The station was founded by Meeker County Radio, Inc. and has served as a central hub for local news and agricultural information for over six decades. Its call letters are a direct reference to its city of license (LitchFielD).

In 1989, the station briefly changed its call sign to KQIV but returned to the heritage KLFD letters on December 6, 1991. The station is currently owned and operated by Steve Gretsch under the license holder Mid-Minnesota Media, LLC. Gretsch, a veteran broadcaster with over 35 years of experience, purchased the station to maintain its "full service" community focus. KLFD is branded as "The Original," reflecting its status as Meeker County's first and longest-running radio outlet. The station operates a Variety format, combining local talk, community events, and musical programming.
