= WQBQ =

- Leesburg, Florida; United States
- Broadcast area: Central Florida
- Frequency: 1410 kHz

Programming
- Format: Soft Oldies
- Affiliations: USA Radio News; Leesburg Lightning

Ownership
- Owner: James and Patricia Floyd; (Floyd Media Radio, Inc.)

History
- First air date: 1962
- Former call signs: WBIL (1962–1965); WZST (1965–1985); WINF (1985–1986); WQBQ (1986–2009); WRHB (2009–2010)

Technical information
- Licensing authority: FCC
- Facility ID: 73913
- Class: D
- Power: 5,000 watts day 88 watts night
- Transmitter coordinates: 28°46′53″N 81°53′30″W
- Translator: 95.1 W236DN (Leesburg)

Links
- Public license information: Public file; LMS
- Webcast: Listen Live
- Website: wqbqradio.com

WQBQ (1410 AM) is a commercial radio station broadcasting a Soft Oldies radio format. Licensed to Leesburg, Florida, the station serves Central Florida. It is currently owned by James and Patricia Floyd, through licensee Floyd Media Radio, Inc. It carries the games of the Leesburg Lightning, a collegiate summer baseball team.

By day, WQBQ transmits with 5,000 watts non-directional. To avoid interfering with other stations on 1410 AM, it reduces power to 88 watts at night. It has been granted a construction permit to add an FM translator on 95.1 MHz.

== History ==
In 1962, the station signed on as WBIL. It was originally a daytimer, required to be off the air at night. The call sign was changed to WZST in 1966, playing country music.

The station became WINF on October 7, 1985. Less than a year later on September 22, 1986, the station changed its call sign to WQBQ. The next call sign change occurred on September 7, 2009, when it became WRHB only to revert to WQBQ on December 10, 2010.
