= XEOY-AM =

Radio station in Mexico City

Simulcast of XHMM-FM 100.1
- Mexico City; Mexico
- Broadcast area: Greater Mexico City
- Frequency: 1000 kHz
- Branding: Stereo Cien

Programming
- Format: Adult contemporary music in English; newscasts

Ownership
- Owner: NRM Comunicaciones; (Fomento de Radio, S.A. de C.V.)
- Sister stations: XHMM-FM, XHSON-FM, XEOYE-FM, XEPH-AM, XEBS-AM

History
- First air date: February 10, 1941

Technical information
- Licensing authority: CRT
- Class: A (clear-channel)
- Power: 50 kW day 20 kW night
- Transmitter coordinates: 19°23′19.5″N 99°07′30.1″W

XEOY-AM is a radio station based in Mexico City on 1000 kHz. The station is owned by NRM Comunicaciones and simulcasts the programming of sister station XHMM-FM 100.1, with the adult contemporary format Stereo Cien.

KNWN in Seattle, Washington, WMVP in Chicago, Illinois and XEOY-AM share Class A status of 1000 AM.

== History ==
XEOY was founded on February 10, 1941, by Ignacio Díaz Raygosa and Jose Iturbe Umantour; Raygosa was the grandson of former Mexican president Porfirio Díaz, while Umantour's grandfather was José Yves Limantour, the finance secretary for most of the Porfiriato. The first broadcast of XEOY-AM was the Ninth Symphony by Ludwig van Beethoven. In 1942 it was sold to Guillermo Salas Peyró, who gave the station its long-running name of "Radio Mil" (Radio Thousand), after its position on the dial. From XEOY-AM, Núcleo Radio Mil was formed, adding XEPH-AM 590, XEMX-AM 1380, XEBS-AM 1410 and XEUR-AM 1530 to the fold.

From the 1950s onward, XEOY's format imitated that of XEW-AM, with general interest and family programming, as well as recorded music. August 28, 1955, saw XEOY branch out onto FM with XEOY-FM, originally on 100.5 MHz and later on 100.9 MHz. In 1961, that station became classical music "Estereomil"; it was swapped with XEBS-FM in 1967 to move to 89.7 MHz (now XEOYE-FM), while 100.9 FM is now XHSON-FM (still owned by NRM).

In 1980, XEOY-AM became the first AM radio station in Mexico to broadcast in stereophonic sound; the SCT would not help stations broadcast in stereo until 1990.

In May 2006, the station switched from its traditional oldies musical format to a primarily talk outlet, focused around promoting tourism and Mexican traditions.

In 2017, the name was changed from Radio Mil to Mil AM, at which time the talk programming began to be phased out and replaced with a musical format again, now consisting of Spanish-language pop from the 1970s to the 2000s, including three daily hours dedicated exclusively to Juan Gabriel, José José and Luis Miguel.

XEOY retook its original name of Radio Mil on November 1, 2020. After 80 years, on June 7, 2021, Radio Mil came to an end and XEOY became a simulcast of XHMM-FM "Stereo Cien".
