= KXSM =

Radio station in Chualar, California

- Chualar, California; United States
- Broadcast area: Salinas Valley, California
- Frequency: 93.1 MHz
- Branding: Radio Lazer 93.1

Programming
- Format: Regional Mexican
- Affiliations: Radio Lazer

Ownership
- Owner: Lazer Media; (Lazer Licenses, LLC)

History
- First air date: 1980
- Former call signs: KHIP (1980–1992); KMXZ (1992–1994); KAXT (1994–1996); KCDU (1996–2003); KBTU (2003–2005)
- Former frequencies: 93.5 MHz (1980–2012)
- Call sign meaning: Disambiguation of KXZM

Technical information
- Licensing authority: FCC
- Facility ID: 34526
- Class: A
- ERP: 2,500 watts
- HAAT: 89 meters (292 ft)
- Transmitter coordinates: 36°27′34.1″N 121°17′54.6″W

Links
- Public license information: Public file; LMS
- Website: radiolazer.com/index.php/salinas-monterey

KXSM (93.1 FM) is a radio station broadcasting a Regional Mexican format as part of the Radio Lazer brand. Licensed to Chualar, California, United States, it serves the Salinas Valley area. The station is currently owned by Lazer Media. Formerly broadcasting at 93.5 MHz, the station changed its frequency to 93.1 MHz in the spring of 2012 so that another Radio Lazer station, KXZM, would be able to move its transmitter and signal nearer to San Jose.

== History ==
This station received a construction permit in 1978, and signed on in 1980 as KHIP, only to become KMXZ in 1992. During this time, it broadcast at 93.5 FM.

In December 1994, KMXZ flipped to country music, branded as "Cat Country 93.5", albeit airing syndicated programming full-time. On July 17, 1995, the callsign was changed to KAXT to match the branding.

On November 4, 1996, KAXT flipped to alternative music, branded as "CD-93" (broadcast studios primarily used CD players at the time). The station's callsign was changed to KCDU to match the new format. At the time of the format change, the core artists included Ani DiFranco, Shawn Colvin, Smashing Pumpkins, Fiona Apple, 311, Counting Crows, Alanis Morissette and others.

In July 1997, the station's playlist shifted to a mainstream Modern Adult Contemporary format. Alternative and Triple A tracks were replaced by pop-leaning songs by artists such as Ace of Base, Madonna and Prince. The station officially changed its slogan to "Today's Music" in August 1997. Around the same time, an all-request 80's New Wave program called "RetroAction" began airing Saturday nights from 9 to midnight, hosted by Sini Man.

The station's Fall 1997 lineup included Mike Skot (mornings), Sandy Shore (middays), program director Bill Goldsmith (afternoons), and Sini Man (evenings). Ms. Shore and Mr. Goldsmith were voicetracked, while Mr. Skot and Mr. Man were live.

In late 1997, the station (and then-sister station KPIG) was sold to NuWave Broadcasting out of Hawaii. The station moved from KPIG's Watsonville studios to NuWave's Salinas studios.

In 1998, the station added even more pop-leaning tracks, including "You're Still The One" by Shania Twain and "My Heart Will Go On" by Celine Dion. A voicetracked DJ simply known as "Christopher" replaced Bill Goldsmith in the afternoons.

In March 1999, the station revamped its lineup, replacing Sandy Shore and Christopher with live DJ's Jae Jae (middays) and Maverick (afternoons). Prior to KCDU, Maverick worked at crosstown KDON-FM for two years. When the new KDON PD (Danny Ocean) came in, he fired Maverick. 10 minutes later, Mav was back on the air at CD93 doing afternoons and soon became the assistant program director. Jae Jae became famous for her "I'm outtie like a belly-button" sign-off phrase, and great stunts like the walk from Monterey to Santa Cruz for a Children's care center in Santa Cruz.

Several programming changes also occurred in March 1999. The first was "10-in-a-row's" - where the station now played 10 songs each hour non-stop without commercials. The second was a new program called "Underground Planet", hosted by Sini Man. "UP" highlighted non-mainstream artists such as Rufus Wainwright, Fleming & John, and Vertical Horizon. The show aired 10-12 weeknights. Finally, the station dropped some of its most pop-leaning artists (including Ace of Base), and shifted back to a true Modern Adult Contemporary station.

In December 1999, Sini Man retired from radio to pursue other interests including his singing career.

In January 2000, the station adopted new sonic imaging with the "Modern Music" slogan. In May 2000, the station moved to NuWave's new radio facility in Monterey, and began using a new music library. "10-in-a-row's" were dropped at this point in favor of a 3-stopset music hour.

All NuWave stations were sold to Mapleton Communications in Spring 2002. After being sold, the station immediately dropped the "Underground Planet" program. The playlist also shifted to a more Hot Adult Contemporary blend, which included current songs by LeAnn Rimes and Jennifer Love Hewitt. The 80's songs also changed to include more Bon Jovi and Def Leppard, and the "80's New-Wave" Saturday night show was subsequently dropped.

On February 28, 2003, KCDU switched callsigns to KBTU and flipped to Rhythmic CHR, branded as 93.5 The Bomb.

On January 9, 2004. KBTU switched callsigns to KOTR. The callsign would only last 1.5 years

In summer 2004, Mapleton Communications put KOTR up for sale. In spring 2005 after nearly 25 years as an English language station, it was announced that Lazer Broadcasting would be acquiring the station for an undisclosed amount. The sale was approved by the FCC on June 7. Upon the closure of the acquisition on July 25, the new owners flipped the station to Regional Mexican. Lazer also changed the callsign to its current KXSM.

On April 8, 2012, KXSM moved down the spectrum to 93.1 FM after receiving regulatory approval.
