= CFIS-FM =

Radio station in British Columbia, Canada

Coordinates: 53°54′37″N 122°46′39″W

- Prince George, British Columbia; Canada
- Frequency: 93.1 MHz
- Branding: Boomer Radio

Programming
- Format: community radio/oldies

Ownership
- Owner: The Prince George Community Radio Society

History
- First air date: July 1, 2007

Technical information
- Class: LP
- ERP: 500 watts
- HAAT: 4.8 metres (16 ft)

Links
- Website: CFIS-FM

CFIS-FM is a not-for-profit community radio station in Prince George, British Columbia, Canada, broadcasting at 93.1 FM. Signing on July 3, 2007, the station is owned and operated by the Prince George Community Radio Society under a developmental community license with a transmitting power of five watts. The format of the station is predominantly (but not exclusively) pre-1980 pop. The station's moniker is Boomer Radio, as their primary target audience is the 55+ age group. However, a variety of specialty Programming, including spoken word programs of community interest, multi-faith programming, local sports and music shows featuring other genres of music ensure that the musical interests of most Prince George residents are represented at some point during the week.

On August 2, 2013, the CRTC approved an application by the Radio Society to operate a new community FM radio station at 93.1 MHz, broadcasting at 494 watts on a non-directional antenna with an effective height of antenna above average terrain of -34.5 metres. This application is, in effect, a replacement of its current license.
