= DZCL =

Defunct radio station

- Ligao; Philippines
- Broadcast area: Albay and surrounding areas
- Frequency: 93.1 MHz

Programming
- Format: Silent

Ownership
- Owner: Kaissar Broadcasting Network

History
- First air date: 2005
- Last air date: 2020
- Former names: Sky Radio (2005-2020)
- Call sign meaning: Caesar Llanora

Technical information
- Licensing authority: NTC

DZCL (93.1 FM) was a radio station owned and operated by Kaissar Broadcasting Network.

It was formerly known as Sky Radio 93.1 from its inception in 2005 to 2020, when it went off the air after the owner's franchise expired. During its existence, it was located along San Jose St., Zone 1, Brgy. Dunao, Ligao. It currently broadcasts online through its website and mobile application. The frequency is currently owned by the Philippine Collective Media Corporation.
