= LaCatorce10 =

LaCatorce10 (CX 44)
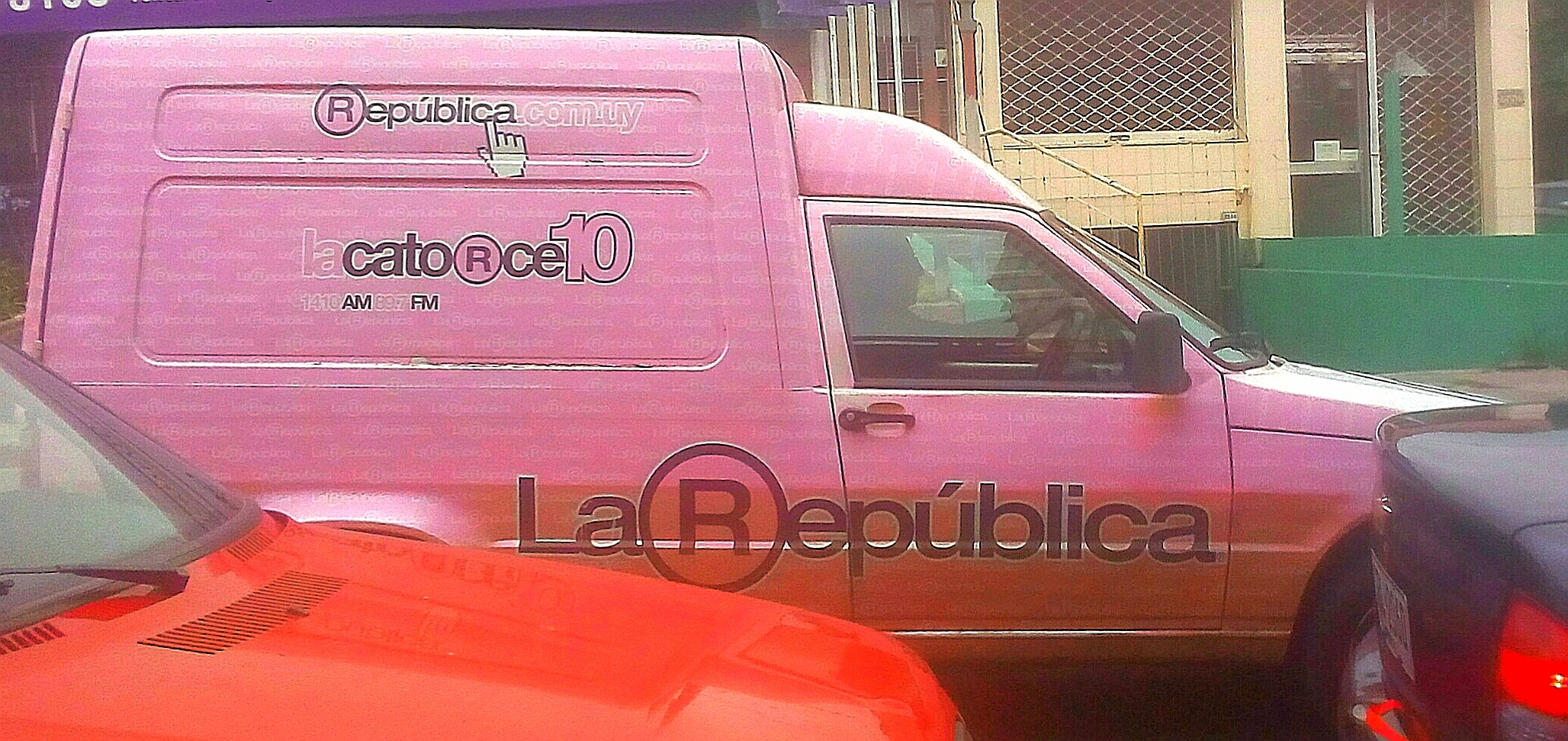
- A van in Montevideo with the 1410 logo.

Montevideo; Uruguay
- Frequency: 1410 AM

Technical information
- Licensing authority: FCC

Links
- Public license information: 44 Public file; LMS
- Website: lacatorce10.com.uy

CX 44, known as "La Catorce 10" (La 1410), is a Uruguayan Spanish language AM radio station that broadcasts from Montevideo, Uruguay.
