= KKBT (FM) =

Radio station in Leone, American Samoa

- Leone, American Samoa; American Samoa
- Broadcast area: American Samoa
- Frequency: 104.7 MHz
- Branding: 104.7 The Beat

Programming
- Format: Rhythmic contemporary
- Affiliations: Premiere Networks; United Stations Radio Networks; Fox News Radio

Ownership
- Owner: Larry Fuss; (Contemporary Communications LLC)
- Sister stations: KKHJ-FM, WVUV-FM

History
- First air date: November 1999
- Former call signs: KHJP (1998-1999); KNWJ (1999-2019)
- Call sign meaning: "Beat"

Technical information
- Licensing authority: FCC
- Facility ID: 81149
- Class: A
- ERP: 280 watts
- HAAT: 457 meters (1499 feet)
- Transmitter coordinates: 14°19′21″S 170°45′47″W

Links
- Public license information: Public file; LMS
- Webcast: Listen Live
- Website: KKBT Online

KKBT (104.7 MHz "104.7 The Beat") is an FM radio station broadcasting an rhythmic contemporary format. The station operates from facilities shared with KKHJ-FM and WVUV-FM on the second floor of the Aitulaga Building in Tafuna, near the Pago Pago International Airport. The transmitting tower is located atop Mt. Oletele. Licensed to Leone, American Samoa, the station is currently owned by Contemporary Communications LLC., whose principal Larry Fuss, is also President of South Seas Broadcasting, Inc., licensee of KKHJ-FM and WVUV-FM.

== History ==
The station was assigned the KNWJ call letters by the Federal Communications Commission on November 30, 1999. The station, which was owned by Showers of Blessings (Gary Sword and family) programmed a religious format before going dark in 2018. After being acquired by Contemporary Communications LLC, the station changed its call sign to the current KKBT on February 20, 2019. It also rebranded as "104.7 The Beat".
