= KTCS (AM) =

Coordinates: 35°16′40″N 94°22′35″W

- Fort Smith, Arkansas; United States
- Broadcast area: Fort Smith metropolitan area
- Frequency: 1410 kHz
- Branding: New Country

Programming
- Format: New Country

Ownership
- Owner: Big Chief Broadcasting Co.

History
- First air date: May 23, 1956 (first license granted)

Technical information
- Licensing authority: FCC
- Class: D
- Power: 1,000 watts day 130 watts night

Links
- Public license information: Public file; LMS
- Website: www.ktcs.com

KTCS (branded as simulcasting KTCS FM on AM 1410) is a radio station serving the Fort Smith metropolitan area with a New Country format. The station broadcasts on AM frequency 1410 kHz and is currently under ownership of Big Chief Broadcasting Co. "
