= Mapusaga, American Samoa =

Mapusaga
- Village
- Location within American Samoa
- Coordinates: 14°19′48″S 170°44′38″W
- Country: United States
- Territory: American Samoa
- County: Tuālāuta
- LDS village foundation: May 10, 1903

Area
  - Total: 0.80 sq mi (2.1 km^{2})

Population (2020)
  - Total: 1,772
  - Density: 1,412.6/sq mi (545.4/km^{2})
- Time zone: UTC−11 (Samoa Time Zone)
- ZIP code: 96799
- Area code: +1 684

Mapusaga is a small village located 9 miles (14 km) west of Pago Pago on Tutuila island in the American territory of American Samoa. Its coordinates are 14.33° south and 170.74389 ° west, with an elevation of 180 feet (55 m). The village is home to American Samoa Community College. An area in the village is called Mapusagafou, which translates to New Mapusaga. Another area in town is known as Mapusagatuai, meaning Old Mapusaga.

The village of Mapusaga was almost entirely displaced during World War II in favor of military installations. It was the location of the U.S. Navy operated Mobile Base Hospital. Mapusaga has been called "Mormon Valley", as the Church of Jesus Christ of Latter-day Saints previously was based here. The Mormons constructed Mapusaga High School in 1928, which was located at the current location of American Samoa Community College (ASCC).

Olotele Mountain is divided between the villages of Mapusagafou (bottom half) and Aoloau (top half). Tucked in the densely rainforested Mapusagafou Mountain is Le Fale’o Cultural Center where there is an authentic village set up with traditional arts, cooking, and customs.

== History ==
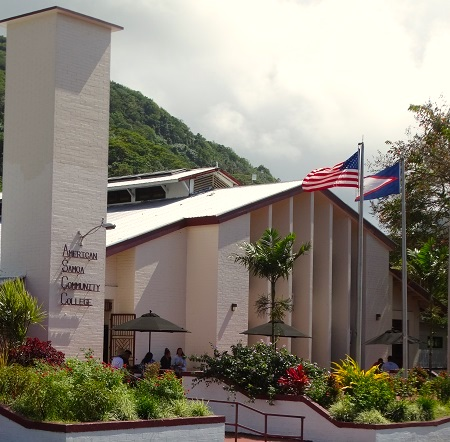
American Samoa Community College

In the 1890s, the Latter Day Saints founded a school in Mapusaga that placed a strong emphasis on agricultural education.

On May 10, 1903, a Latter-day Saint village with a school and 360-acre (150 ha) plantation was founded at Mapusaga. On November 26, 1906, a Relief Society organization for women was established here. In 1938, the Boy Scout organization was begun at Mapusaga. In 1946, Mormon missionaries returned and re-established a school on the Mapusaga plantation property. In 1953, the missionaries purchased the plantation land. On September 19, 1960, Mapusaga High School opened. A bigger high school was established in Pago Pago in 1965 and in 1974, the church decided to close the Mapusaga High School and lease the facilities to the community college.

By 1920, the Latter Day Saints mission had secured 22 acres of land in Mapusaga and leased an additional 386 acres to operate a farm. This farm was utilized to teach boys agricultural practices and to generate income for the mission through the cultivation and sale of copra. Both the mission and its missionaries were exempt from personal taxation, a status shared by missionaries of all other faiths at the time. Tax assessments were conducted in each district by a board comprising the Secretary of Native Affairs, the District Governor, and county chiefs. In the Western District, the tax was established at either 150 pounds of copra per taxpayer or US$11.34 in cash. Additionally, the district imposed a special school tax of US$1.80 per person and proposed an extra road tax of US$6 per individual. Governor Warren Terhune vetoed the proposed road tax, considering it excessive. John Q. Adams, the head of the Mormon Mission in Mapusaga, objected to the school tax levied on Mapusaga residents and contested the taxes imposed on young men from Western Samoa attending the school, arguing that they should only be required to pay US$5 each. Despite presenting his arguments twice, the non-Mormon matai in the district rejected his proposals. Subsequently, Adams appealed to Senator Reed Smoot of Utah, expressing concerns over what he termed “unjust and unreasonable taxation” affecting the residents of Mapusaga.

In July 1970, the American Samoa Community College (ASCC) was established in Fagatogo. The freshman class at ASCC had just 131 enrolled students. It moved permanently to its current location in September 1974 when they took over the former facilities of Mapusaga High School. In 1979, the U.S. Economic Development Administration provided a grant to the college which covered the construction of five new modern structures for science, vocational training, the fine arts, and nursing. The college also added a cafe and gym. A new library was constructed at the college in 2003.

Le Faleo'o Samoan Cultural Center was dedicated on February 1, 2020, in Mapusaga Fou. It is the first and the only living museum in American Samoa.

=== World War II ===
In April 1942, the village of Mapusaga was eventually displaced in favor of the construction of Mobile Base Hospital Three (MOB 3). Eventually, there were as many as 105 buildings covering thirty acres of land at Mapusaga, which required over 300 tons of cargo in order to be built. During the process of construction and relocation of villagers, a chief known as Savea, his wife Lupe and other displaced villagers were unfailingly gracious. When the first Marine casualties began arriving from the fighting at Guadalcanal and Tulagi, the girls of Mapusaga village showed up at MOB 3 bringing the men flowers. The tanks stationed at Mapusaga were festooned with garlands of flowers, and families gathered around the Marines in support and gave them gifts as they boarded the trucks and left Mapusaga to go to war.

During World War II, Marine Corps and U.S. Navy facilities on Tutuila had generally positive effects on the island's residents. U.S. Naval Mobile Hospital No. 3, established at Mapusaga (the site now occupied by the American Samoa Community College), initially consisted by August 1942 of roughly 40 buildings, including an X-ray unit and a second operating room. With the arrival of wounded from Guadalcanal later that month, General Henry Larsen authorized an expansion: U.S. Marine carpenters quickly added a morgue, laboratory, dental clinic, urology clinic and wards, a receiving ward, and an ear, nose, and throat ward, followed by two surgical wards. The complex ultimately reached about 75 buildings with accommodation for approximately 140 beds; its size prompted the naming of two internal streets, Upper Pearl Street and Sands Street. Wounded sailors and Marines arriving on August 27 and 29, 1942, overwhelmed capacity, and the 11th Seabees battalion undertook additional construction.

A distinguished patient at Mapusaga was Captain Edward Rickenbacker, the World War I ace, who was evacuated there after he and several crewmen survived 22 days adrift in a raft when their B-17 was lost on a mission to Australia. In March 1944, the hospital at Mapusaga began to disassemble.
