= WHBI-LP =

- Grantville, Pennsylvania; United States
- Frequency: 93.1 MHz

Programming
- Format: Variety

Ownership
- Owner: Harrisburg Area Media Information Corporation

Technical information
- Licensing authority: FCC
- Facility ID: 135426
- Class: L1
- ERP: 4 watts
- HAAT: 148.0 meters (485.6 ft)
- Transmitter coordinates: 40°24′18.00″N 76°40′55.00″W

Links
- Public license information: LMS

WHBI-LP (93.1 FM) is a radio station licensed to Grantville, Pennsylvania, United States. The station as of at least 2010 is owned by Harrisburg Area Media Information Corporation.
