= WVUV-FM =

Radio station in Fagaitua, American Samoa

Fagaitua, American Samoa; American Samoa
- Broadcast area: Pago Pago
- Frequency: 103.1 MHz
- Branding: V103

Programming
- Format: Samoan and Polynesian favorites

Ownership
- Owner: South Seas Broadcasting, Inc.; (South Seas Broadcasting, Inc.)
- Sister stations: KKHJ-FM, KKBT

History
- First air date: April 7, 2008; 17 years ago
- Former call signs: KHZF (2006-2008)

Technical information
- Licensing authority: FCC
- Facility ID: 164297
- Class: C2
- ERP: 1,300 watts
- HAAT: 485 meters (1591 feet)
- Transmitter coordinates: 14°19′21″S 170°45′47″W

Links
- Public license information: Public file; LMS
- Webcast: Listen Live
- Website: wvuv.com

WVUV-FM (103.1 FM, "V103") is a radio station licensed to Fagaitua, American Samoa, part of the Pago Pago area. The station is located on the second floor of the Aitulagi Building office complex in Tafuna, along with sister stations KKHJ-FM and KKBT. The license is held by South Seas Broadcasting, Inc., which is owned by Larry Fuss, Joey Cummings, Kirk Harnack, and the estate of Smitty Lutu (Lutu died in 2019). Joey Cummings is General Manager. WVUV airs a Samoan and Polynesian music format and operates 24 hours per day.

WVUV is a Class C2 FM station. It has an effective radiated power (ERP) of 1,300 watts, broadcasting from a tower atop Mt. Oletele, at a height above average terrain (HAAT) taller than the Empire State Building.

WVUV-FM is American Samoa's Primary Entry Point station in the Emergency Alert System. V103 employs all local announcers and is live for most of the day and voice-tracked in the evening and overnight. WVUV has a 3-person local news team, which is shared with sister-station KKHJ-FM. Headed by veteran News Director Monica Miller, daily newscasts are aired in both English and Samoan.

== History ==
The construction permit for a new station at 103.1 MHz was assigned the call letters KHZF by the Federal Communications Commission in 2006. The station officially signed on the air on April 7, 2008. At its premiere, it took the call letters of its sister AM station, WVUV, with an -FM suffix. WVUV-FM is the westernmost "W" call sign in the U.S., the only "W" call sign in the Pacific, the only "W" call sign west of Texas, and the only "W" call sign south of the Equator. All other radio and television stations in the American Territories in the Pacific carry "K" call signs.

The "W" call letters date from WVUV, an AM station set up by Homer Willess of the American Armed Forces and broadcasting on 648 kHz. It was used to entertain American GIs who were stationed in Samoa during World War II. It was privatized after the war but kept its unusual call letters. WVUV 648 went dark in 2011. But its owners had those same call letters assigned to its successor FM station on 103.1 MHz.
