= Fagamalo, American Samoa =

Village in American Samoa, USA

Coordinates: 14°17′56″S 170°48′36″W

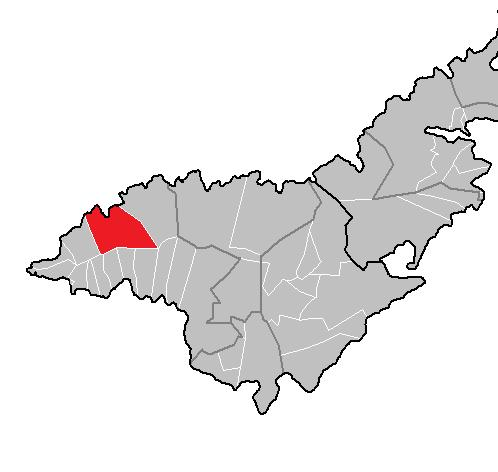
Location of Fagamalo on Tutuila Island

Fagamalo is a village in American Samoa. It is located on the north shore of Tutuila Island. The village was long only reachable by narrow trails over rugged vertical terrain. The trails were often obscured by brush and seldom traveled because they traversed the thick rain forests. It often required hours of hiking before reaching the village. Route 1 now climbs steeply and winds up to the village of Fagamalo, where the road ends. It is located in Lealataua County in the Western District of Tutuila Island.

The coastline between Fagamalo and Fagasā Bay is a rugged and scenic stretch of shoreline which contains the coastal villages of A'asu and Fagasā. This stretch also contains Sita Bay, a cove which has been home to large colonies of flying foxes. Massacre Bay is where a battle between French sailors and Samoans happened in 1787. Pā Cove is near the village of Fagamalo and is the site of a prehistoric village. It has been noted in Samoan legends.

In 1987, researchers from University of Oregon discovered the site of the legendary village of Ā on a ridge above Fagamalo. Initial tests showed that the site was occupied in 600 BCE, which makes it the oldest known village on the island. The village mayor of Fagamalo was charged with attempted murder in 2005. He was held on a $50,000 bail after allegedly jeopardizing the lives of two fishermen. In 2010, Fagamalo was the first village in American Samoa to create a designated protected marine area.

== Etymology ==
The name of the village, Fagamalo, is derived from the Samoan language and translates into English as “Conquerors' bay".

== History ==
The Community-Based Fisheries Program (CFMP) was established in 2000 to promote locally driven marine conservation in American Samoa. This initiative encouraged villages, such as Fagamalo (home to the Fagamalo Village Marine Protected Area), to develop and manage their own marine protection policies. Initially, these protected areas were not legally enforceable under the jurisdiction of the American Samoa Government (ASG). In 2005, a court case challenged the authority of village residents in Fagamalo to enforce CFMP regulations. In response, the Department of Marine and Wildlife Resources (DMWR) proposed legislation to grant legal enforcement authority over Village Marine Protected Areas (VMPAs) to the agency. This legislation was passed in 2008 with the goal of ensuring that the territory's waters remained safe habitats for marine life, thereby supporting the sustainability of fish, shellfish, and other species for the benefit of American Samoa’s residents, future generations, and visitors. By 2016, VMPAs covered approximately 25% of the coral reef areas in American Samoa.

== Demographics ==
Year	Population
2020	37
2010	47
2000	39
1990	92
1980	68
1970	62
1960	93

== See also ==
- Fagamalo Village Marine Protected Area
- A'a Village Site
