= KVPP =

Radio station in Pago Pago, American Samoa

- Pago Pago, American Samoa; American Samoa
- Broadcast area: Tutuila Island, American Samoa
- Frequency: 88.9 MHz
- Branding: 88.9 K-Love

Programming
- Language: English
- Format: Contemporary Christian music

Ownership
- Owner: Rev. Shannon Cummings; (Rev. Shannon Cummings DBA Pure Truth Ministries)

History
- First air date: December 2011
- Former call signs: KBTB (2011-2014); KKBT (2014-2019)
- Call sign meaning: K-Love Pago Pago

Technical information
- Licensing authority: FCC
- Facility ID: 176105
- Class: A
- ERP: 960 watts
- HAAT: 442 meters (1,450 ft)
- Transmitter coordinates: 14°16′12″S 170°41′10″W

Links
- Public license information: Public file; LMS
- Website: http://www.klove.com

KVPP (88.9 FM) is a non-commercial educational radio station licensed to serve the community of Pago Pago, American Samoa. The station's broadcast license, issued in January 2012, is held by Rev. Shannon Cummings DBA Pure Truth Ministries.

== History ==
In October 2007, Marianas Educational Media Services applied to the U.S. Federal Communications Commission (FCC) for a construction permit for a new broadcast radio station. The FCC granted this permit on December 18, 2008, with a scheduled expiration date of December 18, 2011. The new station was assigned call sign "KBTB" on December 26, 2011. After construction and testing were completed in December 2011, the station was granted its broadcast license on January 3, 2012.

KBTB was purchased by Rev. Shannon Cummings, doing business as Pure Truth Ministries, for $2,000; the purchase was consummated on June 17, 2013.

On August 1, 2014, the station's call sign was changed to KKBT. On February 9, 2018, the station signed off the air. The station changed its call sign to the current KVPP on February 20, 2019. The station along with its new call letters KVPP has returned to the air airing the K-Love Contemporary Christian music format. The KKBT callsign was moved to the former KNWJ-FM, which now broadcasts a Rhythmic Contemporary format.
