= WVVB (AM) =

- Kingston, Tennessee; United States
- Frequency: 1410 kHz
- Branding: 94.1 The Vibe

Programming
- Format: Top 40

Ownership
- Owner: John and Brannigan Tollett; (3B Tennessee, Inc.)

History
- First air date: 1978
- Former call signs: WTNR (1978-?); WYLQ (?-1985); WBBX (1985–2019)
- Call sign meaning: "Vibe"

Technical information
- Licensing authority: FCC
- Facility ID: 52597
- Class: D
- Power: 500 watts (day only)
- Transmitter coordinates: 35°52′49.00″N 84°30′56.00″W
- Translator: 94.1 W231DY (Kingston)
- Repeater: 105.7 WIHG-HD2 (Rockwood)

Links
- Public license information: Public file; LMS
- Webcast: Listen Live

WVVB (1410 kHz) is a daytime only AM radio stations originally broadcasting a gospel format. Licensed to Kingston, Tennessee, United States, the station is currently owned by John and Brannigan Tollett, through licensee 3B Tennessee, Inc. On September 1, 2018, the then-WBBX was renamed 94.1 The Vibe. The station changed its call sign to WVVB on March 6, 2019.
