= KKHJ-FM =

Radio station in Pago Pago, American Samoa

- Pago Pago, American Samoa; American Samoa
- Broadcast area: American Samoa
- Frequency: 93.1 MHz (HD Radio)
- Branding: 93 KHJ

Programming
- Format: Adult Top 40

Ownership
- Owner: South Seas Broadcasting, Inc.; (South Seas Broadcasting, Inc.)
- Sister stations: WVUV-FM, KKBT

History
- First air date: November 1999
- Former call signs: KHJS (March 9, 1998-May 1, 2000); KKHJ (May 1, 2000-June 26, 2007)
- Call sign meaning: Tribute to KHJ Los Angeles, which also used the KKHJ callsign from 1990 to 2000

Technical information
- Licensing authority: FCC
- Facility ID: 78508
- Class: C3
- ERP: 1,100 watts
- HAAT: 454 meters
- Transmitter coordinates: 14°15′53.9″S 170°41′14.6″W

Links
- Public license information: Public file; LMS
- Webcast: Listen Live
- Website: http://khjradio.com/

KKHJ-FM (93.1 FM) is a radio station broadcasting an Adult Top 40 format. Licensed to Pago Pago, American Samoa, it serves American Samoa, the only U.S. territory south of the equator. The station is owned by South Seas Broadcasting, Inc. It originally signed on in November 1999 with a Hot AC format. South Seas Broadcasting is owned by Larry Fuss, Kirk Harnack, Joey Cummings and the estate of Smitty Lutu (Lutu died in 2019). Joey Cummings in the General Manager. In September 2017, the station moved from its longtime home in Pago Plaza to the second floor of the Aitulagi Building, on Fagaima Road in Tafuna, near the Pago Pago International Airport. Transmitting facilities are located atop Mount ʻAlava, overlooking Pago Harbor, with secondary facilities on Mount Olotele, overlooking Tafuna (translator K229BG, operating on 93.7 MHz).

The station was assigned the callsign KHJS by the Federal Communications Commission on March 9, 1998. It changed callsigns to KKHJ on May 1, 2000, then to the current KKHJ-FM on June 26, 2007.

== Programming ==
93KHJ features a 2-person morning show called "Samoan Sunrise", hosted by John Raynar and Keziah ("Sia") Atofau. The morning show is also telecast on the Island Info Channel, a local cable TV channel.

== News ==
93KHJ has a 3-person local news team, which is rather unusual for a small-market radio station. Headed by veteran News Director Monica Miller, 93KHJ produces daily newscasts in both English and Samoan. Newscasts are also heard on sister station WVUV-FM.

== Translators ==
| Call sign | Frequency | City of license | FID | ERP (W) | Class | FCC info |
|---|---|---|---|---|---|---|
| K229BG | 93.7 FM | [[Pavaʻiaʻi, American Samoa]] | 138194 | 10 | D | LMS |
