= List of postage stamps of India (2021–2025) =

This is a list of postage stamps issued by the India Post between 2021 and 2025.

== 2021 ==
| # | Issue date | Image | Description | Denomination | Ref. |
|---|---|---|---|---|---|
| 1 | 23 January 2021 | | 125th Birth Anniversary Year of Netaji Subhas Chandra Bose | 25.00 | |
| 2 | 25 January 2021 | | 50 Years of full Statehood of Himachal Pradesh | 5.00 | |
| 3 | 6 February 2021 | | The High Court Of Gujarat | 5.00 | |
| 4 | 23 March 2021 | | 100 Years of First Visit of Mahatma Gandhi to Odisha | 5.00 | |
| 5 | 27 March 2021 | | Golden Jubilee Year of India Bangladesh Friendship | 5.00 | |
| 6 | 12 April 2021 | | Rajyogini Dadi Janki | 5.00 | |
| 7 | 10 June 2021 | | 70 Years of Diplomatic relations between India and Germany | 5.00 | |
| 8 | 20 June 2021 | | Golden Jubilee Year - Gayatri Teerth, Shantikunj | 5.00 | |
| 9 | 7 August 2021 | | Chaman Lal | 5.00 | |
| 10 | 17 September 2021 | | Rao Jaimal Rathore | 5.00 | |
| 11 | 2 October 2021 | | Martyrs of Solapur namely "Mallappa Dhanshetty, Shrikisan Sarada, Jagannath Shinde and Abdul Rasul Kurban Hussain" | 5.00 | |
| 12 | 6 October 2021 | | Deccan College Bicentenary | 5.00 | |
| 13 | 10 November 2021 | | Dattopant Thengadi | 5.00 | |
| 14 | 27 November 2021 | | S.C.B. Medical College & Hospital, Cuttack | 5.00 | |
| 15 | 1 December 2021 | | 75 Years of Mahindra Group | 12.00 | |
| 16 | 16 December 2021 | | Swarnim Vijay Varsha | 5.00 | |

== 2022 ==
| # | Issue date | Image | Description | Denomination | Ref. |
|---|---|---|---|---|---|
| 1 | 15 January 2022 | | Permanent Commission to Women Officers in Indian Army | 10.00 (2); 15.00 (2) | |
| 2 | 16 January 2022 | | Department of Health Research | 5.00 | |
| 3 | 21 January 2022 | | 50 Years of full Statehood of Manipur | 5.00 | |
| 4 | 21 January 2022 | | 50 Years of full Statehood of Meghalaya | 5.00 | |
| 5 | 21 January 2022 | | 50 Years of full Statehood of Tripura | 5.00 | |
| 6 | 5 February 2022 | | 50th Anniversary of ICRISAT | 5.00 | |
| 7 | 16 February 2022 | | Delhi Police - Platinum Jubilee | 5.00 | |
| 8 | 18 February 2022 | | Joint celebrations of the year of 50th Anniversary of UAE's formation and the 75th Anniversary of the Independence of India | 25.00 | |
| 9 | 20 February 2022 | | 50 Years of Arunachal Pradesh | 5.00 | |
| 10 | 21 February 2022 | | President's Fleet Review 2022 | 5.00 | |
| 11 | 13 March 2022 | | Rashtriya Indian Military College, Deharadun | 5.00 | |
| * | | | 36th International Geological Congress (Set of 2 Stamps) | | |
| 12 | 20 March 2022 | | Amethyst | 5.00 each | |
| 13 | 20 March 2022 | | Himalayas | 10.00 each | |
| * | | | India and Turkmenistan - 30 Years of Partnership, (Set of 2 Stamps) | | |
| 14 | 3 April 2022 | | Sankirtana | 25.00 | |
| 15 | 3 April 2022 | | Kushtdepdi | 25.00 | |
| 16 | 18 April 2022 | | Pandurang Vaman Kane | 5.00 | |
| 17 | 21 April 2022 | | Prakash Guru Parab Sri Guru Tegh Bahadur Sahib Ji | 25.00 | |
| 18 | 1 May 2022 | | University of Delhi Centenary Year | 10.00 | |
| 19 | 14 June 2022 | | Mumbai Samachar | 5.00 | |
| 20 | 29 June 2022 | | Karpatri Maharaj | 5.00 | |
| 21 | 20 July 2022 | | 44th FIDE Chess Olympiad Chennai 2022 | 5.00 | |
| 22 | 30 July 2022 | | Right to Free Legal Aid | 5.00 | |
| 23 | 2 August 2022 | | Journey of the National Flag of India | 75.00 | |
| 24 | 20 August 2022 | | Ondiveeran | 5.00 | |
| 25 | 1 September 2022 | | 2nd International Tiger Forum | 5.00 | |
| 26 | 11 October 2022 | | Sawai Gandharva | 5.00 | |
| 27 | 12 October 2022 | | Golden Jubilee of PIN Code | 5.00 | |
| 28 | 18 October 2022 | | 90th General Assembly of INTERPOL | 5.00 | |
| 29 | 26 October 2022 | | 150th Birth Anniversary of Vijay Vallabh Surishwer | 5.00 | |
| 30 | 3 November 2022 | | Platinum Jubilee Assam Medical College | 5.00 | |
| 31 | 25 November 2022 | | 175 Years of IIT Roorkee | 5.00 | |
| 32 | 12 December 2022 | | Pa Togan Nengminza Sangma | 5.00 | |
| 33 | 13 December 2022 | | 150th Birth Anniversary of Sri Aurobindo | 150.00 | |
| 34 | 13 December 2022 | | 125 Years of Sardar School Jodhpur | 5.00 | |
| 35 | 31 December 2022 | | Visamanbapu | 5.00 | |

== 2023 ==
| # | Issue date | Image | Description | Denomination | Ref. |
|---|---|---|---|---|---|
| 1 | 9 January 2023 | | Surakshit Jayen Prashishit Jayen | 5.00 | |
| 2 | 23 January 2023 | | Major Durga Mall | 5.00 | |
| 3 | 2 February 2023 | | 150th Birth Anniversary of Ram Chandra Maharaj | 5.00 | |
| 4 | 4 February 2023 | | General K. S. Thimayya | 5.00 | |
| 5 | 12 February 2023 | | Bridal Costumes of India | | |
| 6 | 13 February 2023 | | Geographical Indications: Agricultural Goods | 5.00 | |
| 7 | 20 February 2022 | | Rao Birender Singh | 5.00 | |
| 8 | 24 February 2023 | | 225 Glorious Years 2nd Battalion, Parachute Regiment (Special Forces) | 5.00 | |
| 9 | 2 March 2023 | | 75 Years of 1 Central Base Post Office | 5.00 | |
| 10 | 14 March 2023 | | 75 Years of India – Luxembourg Friendship | 5.00 | |
| 11 | 18 March 2023 | | International Year of Millets (Shree Anna) | 5.00 | |
| * | 30 March 2023 | | Legends of Odisha | | |
| 12 | 30 March 2023 | | Akshaya Mohanty | 10.00 | |
| 13 | 30 March 2023 | | Kelucharan Mohapatra | 10.00 | |
| 14 | 30 March 2023 | | Laxmikanta Mohapatra | 10.00 | |
| 15 | 30 March 2023 | | Parbati Ghose | 10.00 | |
| 16 | 3 April 2023 | | Diamond Jubilee of CBI | 5.00 | |
| 17 | 5 April 2023 | | Gauhati High Court | 5.00 | |
| 18 | 7 April 2023 | | Dayanand Saraswati | 5.00 | |
| 19 | 19 April 2023 | | 75th Year of Indian Army Day | 5.00 | |
| 20 | 26 April 2023 | | Mann Ki Baat | 5.00 | |
| 21 | 22 May 2023 | | 250th Birth Anniversary of Raja Ram Mohan Roy | 5.00 | |
| 22 | 28 May 2023 | | Parliament Complex | 75.00 | |
| 23 | 15 Jun 2023 | | SCO Council of Heads of State | 5.00 | |
| 24 | 20 Jun 2023 | | Raj Bhavan, Uttar Pradesh | 5.00 | |
| 25 | 4 Jul 2023 | | Sardar Antaji Mankeshwar Gandhe | 5.00 | |
| 26 | 26 Jul 2023 | | Orissa High Court | 5.00 | |
| 27 | 26 Jul 2023 | | G20 Leaders' Summit, New Delhi 2023 | 20.00 each | |
| 28 | 12 Sep 2023 | | Dada J P Vaswani | 5.00 | |
| 29 | 5 Oct 2023 | | 500th Birth Anniversary of Rani Durgavati | 5.00 | |
| 30 | 7 Oct 2023 | | Hemachandra Vikramaditya | 5.00 | |
| * | 50 years of establishment of Diplomatic Relations between India and Vietnam, (Set of 2 Stamps) | | | | |
| 31 | 16 Oct 2023 | | Vovinam | 5.00 | |
| 32 | 16 Oct 2023 | | Kalaripayattu | 25.00 | |
| 33 | 21 Oct 2023 | | 125th anniversary of the Scindia School | 5.00 | |
| 34 | 27 Oct 2023 | | Arvind N. Mafatlal | 20.00 | |
| 35 | 2 November 2023 | | 75th Anniversary of Diplomatic Relations between India and Mauritius | 20.00 | |
| 36 | 7 November 2023 | | Platinum Jubilee (1948-2023) Raman Research Institute | 5.00 | |
| 37 | 23 November 2023 | | 525th Birth Anniversary of Meera Bai | 5.00 | |
| 38 | 30 November 2023 | | 75 Glorious Years of National Defence Academy | | |
| 39 | 5 December 2023 | | 125 Years of Hindu College | 5.00 | |
| 40 | 8 December 2023 | | India Art Architecture Design Biennale 2023 | 5.00 | |
| 41 | 15 December 2023 | | Celebrating India and Oman's Friendship (set of 2 Stamps) | 25.00 each | |
| 42 | 15 December 2023 | | Rani Abbakka Devi | 5.00 | |
| 43 | 24 December 2023 | | Acharya Sushil Kumar | 5.00 | |
| 43 | 26 December 2023 | | Khartargachha Millennium | 5.00 | |
| 45 | 27 December 2023 | | 125 Years of Ramakrishna Mission | 5.00 | |
| 46 | 27 December 2023 | | 50 Years Pandit Jasraj’s Pt. Motiram Pt. Maniram Sangeet Samaroha | 5.00 | |
| 47 | 29 December 2023 | | Diamond Jubilee of Sashastra Seema Bal | 5.00 | |
| 48 | 29 December 2023 | | 200 Years of Indian Origin Tamils in Sri Lanka | 5.00 | |

== 2024 ==
| # | Issue date | Image | Description | Denomination | Ref. |
|---|---|---|---|---|---|
| 1 | 18 January 2024 | | Shri Ram Janmbhoomi Temple (Set of 6 Stamps) | 500 p each | |
| 2 | 24 January 2024 | | 100th Birth Anniversary of Karpoori Thakur | 500 p | |
| 3 | 25 January 2024 | | Bharat – The Mother of Democracy (Set of 3 Stamps) | 500 p | |
| 4 | 25 January 2024 | | Inclusive elections - Election Commission of India | 500 p | |
| 5 | 31 January 2024 | | The Bombay Sappers War Memorial | 500 p | |
| 6 | 8 February 2024 | | 150th Birth Anniversary of Srila Bhaktisiddhanta Saraswati Prabhupad | 500 p | |
| 7 | 14 February 2024 | | 125th Birth Anniversary Ram Chandra | 500 p | |
| 8 | 20 February 2024 | | Cultural Heritage of Western Odisha | 500 p (6) | |
| 9 | 20 February 2024 | | Legendary Poets of Odisha | 1000p (2) | |
| 10 | 23 February 2024 | | Sarangadhar Das | 500 p | |
| 11 | 25 February 2024 | | Yakshagana | 500p | |
| 12 | 27 February 2024 | | Centenary Year All India Railwaymen's Federation | 500p | |
| 13 | 20 April 2024 | | Mahatma Hansraj | 500p | |
| 14 | 21 April 2024 | | Bhagwan Mahaveer 2550th Nirvan Kalyanak | 500p | |
| 15 | 6 July 2024 | | Siddharudha Swami | 500p | |
| 16 | 24 July 2024 | | 100th Birth Anniversary of Mukesh | 3000p | |
| 17 | 24 July 2024 | | Wazir Mohd Hakla Poonchi | 500p | |
| 18 | 26 July 2024 | | Kargil Vijay Diwas Silver Jubilee 2024 | 500p | |
| 19 | 5 August 2024 | | XXXIII Olympics Paris 2024 (Set of 4 Stamps) | 500p each | |
| 20 | 31 August 2024 | | Supreme Court of India – 75 Years | 1000p | |
| 21 | 14 September 2024 | | Diamond Jubilee of Rajbhasha | 500p | |
| 22 | 16 September 2024 | | 75 Years of Diplomatic Relations (India-Romania) (Joint Issue - Set of 2 Stamps) | 5000p each | |
| 23 | 20 September 2024 | | 100th Birth Anniversary of Akkineni Nageswara Rao | 1000p | |
| 24 | 9 October 2024 | | 150th anniversary of the Universal Postal Union (UPU) (Set of 3 Stamps) | 1500p each | |
| 25 | 23 October 2024 | | 200 years of Kittur Vijayotsav | 500p | |
| 26 | 9 November 2024 | | Vadtal Dham Dwishatabdi Mahotsav | 500p | |
| 27 | 10 November 2024 | | Acharya Shantisagar Muni Maharaj | 500p | |
| 28 | 10 November 2024 | | Dada Bhagwan | 500p | |
| 29 | 15 November 2024 | | Sickle Cell Eradication – 2047 | 500p | |
| 30 | 15 November 2024 | | 150th Birth Anniversary of Birsa Munda | 500p | |
| 31 | 16 November 2024 | | 100 Years of Hindustan Times | 500p | |
| 32 | 21 November 2024 | | 125th Birth Anniversary of Dr. Harekrushna Mahtab | 500p | |
| 33 | 25 November 2024 | | International Year of Cooperatives | 500p | |
| 34 | 26 November 2024 | | 75th Anniversary of Constitution | 500p | |
| 35 | 6 December 2024 | | Ashtalakshmi Mahotsav | 500p | |
| 36 | 11 December 2024 | | 75 years of UNICEF with India | 1000p | |
| 37 | 15 December 2024 | | 200th birth anniversary of Maharshi Dayananda Saraswati | 500p | |
| 38 | 15 December 2024 | | Centenary of Tansen Samaroh | 500p | |
| 39 | 25 December 2024 | | Atal Bihari Vajpayee Birth Centenary | 500p | |
| 40 | 25 December 2024 | | 2800th Nirvan Kalyanak of Bhagwan Parshvanath | 500p | |
| 41 | 25 December 2024 | | 2900th Janm Kalyanak of Bhagwan Parshvanath | 500p | |
| 42 | 30 December 2024 | | 50 Years of NIMHANS | 500p, 500p, 1000p | |
| 43 | 31 December 2024 | | Veer Meghmaya | 500p | |

== 2025 ==
| # | Issue date | Image | Description | Denomination | Ref. |
|---|---|---|---|---|---|
| 1 | 28 January 2025 | | Peasant Uprising of Patharughat-1894 | 500 p | |
| 2 | 11 February 2025 | | India - Israel Joint Issue (Set of 2 stamps) | 500 p each | |
| 3 | 13 February 2025 | | Maha Kumbh 2025 (Set of 3 stamps) | 500 p each | |
| 4 | 13 February 2025 | | National School of Drama (Set of 2 stamps) | 1000 p each | |
| 5 | 11 March 2025 | | G.I. Products of Bihar (Set of 5) | 500 p each | |
| * | | | Bhagalpuri Zardalu | 500 p | |
| * | | | Katarani Rice | 500 p | |
| * | | | Magahi Paan | 500 p | |
| * | | | Mithila Makhana | 500 p | |
| * | | | Shahi litchi | 500 p | |
| 6 | 22 March 2025 | | 5th Battalion, The Rajput Regiment | 500 p | |
| 7 | 25 March 2025 | | Mata Karma | 500 p | |
| 8 | 7 April 2025 | | 50 Years of reestablishment of Diplomatic Relations between India and Portugal | 5000 p, 5000 p | |
| 9 | 1 May 2025 | | Birth Centenary of Legends (set of 5) | 500 p each | |
| * | | | Birth Centenary of Legends — Guru Dutt | 500 p | |
| * | | | Birth Centenary of Legends — Ritwik Ghatak | 500 p | |
| * | | | Birth Centenary of Legends — Salil Chowdhury | 500 p | |
| * | | | Birth Centenary of Legends — Raj Khosla | 500 p | |
| * | | | Birth Centenary of Legends — P. Bhanumathi | 500 p | |
| 10 | 16 May 2025 | | 125 Years of Kodaikanal Solar Observatory | 500 p | |
| 11 | 29 May 2025 | | 50 Years of Statehood of Sikkim | 500 p | |
| 12 | 31 May 2025 | | 300th Birth Anniversary of Ahilya Bai Holkar | 500 p | |
| 13 | 20 June 2025 | | 125 Years of Raj Bhawan, Nainital | 500 p | |
| 14 | 21 June 2025 | | 11th International Day of Yoga | 500 p | |
| 15 | 28 June 2025 | | 100th Birth Anniversary of Acharya Vidyanand | 500 p | |
| 16 | 9 July 2025 | | 125th Birth Anniversary of Shyama Prasad Mukherjee | 500 p | |
| 17 | 13 July 2025 | | Chandra Bhanu Gupta | 500 p | |
| 18 | 17 July 2025 | | Centenary Celebration of Mysore Medical College & Research Institute | 500 p | |
| 19 | 24 July 2025 | | Rani Chennabhairadevi | 500 p | |
| 20 | 25 July 2025 | | 60 Years of establishment of Diplomatic Relations Between India and Maldives (Set of 2) | 6000 p each | |
| 21 | 2 August 2025 | | Purshottamdas H. Purohit | 500 p | |
| 22 | 5 August 2025 | | 75th Anniversary of India-Philippines Diplomatic Relations (Set of 2) | 5000 p each | |
| 23 | 7 August 2025 | | M. S. Swaminathan | 500 p | |
| 24 | 17 August 2025 | | Laxmidas Borkar | 500 p | |
| 25 | 24 August 2025 | | Vithalbhai Patel | 500 p | |
| 26 | 30 August 2025 | | Madhvacharya | 500 p | |
| 27 | 4 September 2025 | | Ranchi Institute of Neuropsychiatry and Allied Sciences | 500 p | |
| 28 | 30 September 2025 | | President's Bodyguard | 500 p | |
| 29 | 1 October 2025 | | 100 Year's of Rashtriya Swayamsevak Sangh | 500 p | |
| 30 | 1 October 2025 | | Military Nursing Service | 500 p | |
| 31 | 11 October 2025 | | Sitaram Maroo | 500 p | |
| 32 | 14 October 2025 | | 70th Anniversary of the establishment of diplomatic relations between India & Mongolia (Miniature sheet of 2 Stamps) | 5000 p each | |
| 33 | 15 October 2025 | | New Mangalore Port Authority | 500 p | |
| 34 | 24 October 2025 | | 80 Years of United Nations | 500 p | |
| 35 | 30 October 2025 | | 150th birth anniversary of Sardar Vallabhbhai Patel | 500 p | |
| 36 | 7 November 2025 | | 150 years of Vande Mataram | 500 p | |
| 37 | 16 November 2025 | | 150th birth anniversary of Acharya Jawahar lal | 500 p | |
| 38 | 19 November 2025 | | Birth Centenary of Sri Sathya Sai Baba (Miniature sheet of 4 Stamps) | 500 p each | |
| 39 | 24 November 2025 | | Platinum jubilee of IIT Kharagpur (Se-tenant stamp) | 500 p each | |
| 40 | 24 November 2025 | | The Bharat Scouts and Guides - Diamond Jubilee | 500 p | |
| 41 | 25 November 2025 | | 350th Martyrdom Day of Sri Guru Tegh Bahadur Ji | 500 p | |
| 42 | 27 November 2025 | | K. Vaikunth | 500 p | |
| 43 | 1 December 2025 | | National Centre for Polar and Ocean Research | 500 p | |
| 44 | 13 December 2025 | | 150th Anniversary of Bombay Gymkhana | 500 p | |
| 45 | 14 December 2025 | | Perumbidugu Mutharaiyar II | 500 p | |
| 46 | 16 December 2025 | | 100th Birth Anniversary of Arudra | 500 p | |
| 47 | 19 December 2025 | | Medicinal plants of India (Miniature sheet - set of 5 stamps) | 500 p each | |
| 48 | 22 December 2025 | | 100 years of association of Indian universities | 500 p | |
| 49 | 31 December 2025 | | 100 years of Electrification in Indian Railways | 1000 p each | |
