= G. P. Chopra =

Indian academic

- Born: 1920; India
- Died: 23 September 2011 (aged 90–91); New Delhi
- Occupation: Educationist
- Awards: Padma Bhushan; Padma Shri; Delhi Ratna; Qimpro Platinum Award; FUREC Distinguished Fellow
- Website: Official web site of DAV Network

Gyan Prakash Chopra (1920-2011) was an Indian educationist, credited with the establishment of several educational institutions in India. A recipient of the Padma Shri in 1999, he was honored again by the Government of India, in 2010, with the Padma Bhushan, the third highest civilian award, for his services to the field of education.

== Biography ==
G. P. Chopra was born in 1920, in the pre-independence India. After graduating in English Literature, he joined Murray College, Sialkot, in the present day Pakistan, as a lecturer. After the Indian independence and partition, he moved to New Delhi and joined Hans Raj College of Delhi University and taught at the college till his retirement from teaching service.

Gyan Prakash Chopra was the President of DAV network of institutions, a 123-year-old non governmental organization focused on education. During his period, he was successful in establishing over several DAV educational institutions across the country, including the rural and tribal areas of Himachal Pradesh, Jharkhand and Orissa.

== DAV network ==
DAV network of institutions is an education-focused group, started in 1886, which runs over 700 educational institutions in various parts of the country, with a student strength of about one million. The group witnessed growth during Chopra's reign as the President of the Managing Committee. The first of the DAV schools was started in 1885, followed by the establishment of the DAV Trust and Management Society, a year later. The movement, founded by Dayanand Saraswati, at various points of time, involved many notable personalities such as Mahatma Hans Raj, Mehr Chand, Lala Balraj, Justice Mehar Chand Mahajan, Dr. G. L. Dutta, Lala Suraj Bhan, Prof Ved Vyas, Darbari Lal, T. R. Tuli, G. P. Chopra and Punam Suri.

== Awards and recognitions ==
- Padma Bhushan - 2010
- Padma Shri - 1999
- Qimpro Platinum Standard - 2009
- Delhi Ratna — All India Conference of Intellectuals
- Distinguished Fellow — Foundation for Unity of Religions and Enlightened Citizenship (FUREC)
