= Hansraj College =

College in New Delhi, India

Coordinates: 28°40′44″N 77°12′37″E

- Crest of Hansraj College, University of Delhi
- Type: College
- Established: 1948; 78 years ago
- Affiliations: University of Delhi
- Principal: Dr. Rama
- Location: Delhi, India
- Campus: Mahatma Hans Raj Marg, Malka Ganj, North Campus, University of Delhi-110007
- Nicknames: HRC, Hansraj
- Website: www.hansrajcollege.ac.in
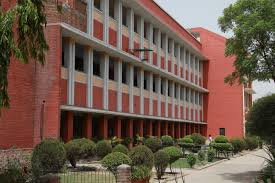

Hansraj College is a constituent college of the University of Delhi, in Delhi, India. Established in 1948 and situated in the Delhi University North Campus. It is considered one of the best colleges in India. It is ranked 3rd among colleges in India by the National Institutional Ranking Framework (NIRF) in 2025 and is accredited A++ by NAAC, scoring a CGPA of 3.71, one of the highest among DU colleges. It is a premier institution of the DAV Managing Committee - the largest non-government educational organization of the country. On 26 July 1948, the college was set up in memory of Mahatma Hansraj (1882–1938) the founder of DAV College Lahore and a pioneer in the field of education. Departments include science, liberal arts, and commerce.

== History ==
The college was founded on 26 July 1948 in memory of the prominent Indian educator and nationalist Mahatma Hansraj. Initially started as an institution for men, the college became co-educational in 1978. With around 5,000 students, it is one of the largest constituent colleges of the University of Delhi. For years Hansraj College has been ranked among the Top-10 colleges of India in all three disciplines. At the celebration of its 69th Foundation Day, Naveen Jindal, industrialist and alumnus, announced that Hans Raj College would become the first college in Delhi University to hoist the national flag on its premises. The college hoisted the Monumental Flag on 25 January 2017 which happens to be the second Monumental Flagpole in Delhi after CP. The flag was hoisted by MP Naveen Jindal, an alumnus of the college and founder of Flag Foundation of India (FFOI).

== Ranking and gradings ==
It was ranked third among all the colleges in India by National Institutional Ranking Framework (NIRF) in 2025 and accredited A++ with a CGPA of 3.71 by National Assessment and Accreditation Council (NAAC). In 2025, India Today ranked it as the 3rd best college for commerce and science and the 5th best for arts in India.

== Academics ==
The college offers undergraduate and postgraduate courses in various streams. These are B.A, B.A (Hons), B.Sc., B.Sc. (Hons) and B.Com. (Hons) at the UG level. And M.A, M.Sc. and M.Com. at the PG level.

It also offers job-oriented add-on certificate courses. These include: Radio Jockeying, Anchoring & TV Journalism; Acting and Filmmaking; Mass Communication, Advertising & Marketing.

The college receives support under the strengthening component in relation to the Star College initiative of the Department of Biotechnology, Government of India. In addition to this, the college has worked on the future publication of the research journal "Hans Shodh Sudha" to publish research in fields across the sciences, commerce and arts. The Biological Science Research Cell and Finance and Economics Research Cell of the college also conducts programs to promote undergraduate research in these fields.

Departments: Botany, Chemistry, Computer Science, Electronics, Mathematics, Physics, Zoology, Commerce, Economics, English, Hindi, History, Philosophy, Physical Education, Sanskrit, Anthropology, Geology.

== Infrastructure and facilities ==
The college has a central library, departmental libraries for science subjects and a Book Bank for needy students. The college has six computer and eighteen science laboratories. Sports facilities include a gym, a sports field, open basketball court, an indoor Badminton Court, Table Tennis Tables, Yoga room, meditation room, and an electronic shooting range.

The college had an auditorium with sound and light systems, and a seating capacity of 400-500 persons along with a balcony on the first floor to host dignitaries and guests, but is currently under reconstruction. Additionally there are two seminar rooms with a seating capacity of 100 each, equipped with audio-visual facilities, projectors, air-conditioning and podiums.

The college has hostel facilities for boys and girls accommodating more than 200 undergraduate students. The hostel includes a dining hall, a common room, kitchen and gym. It also provides amenities such as solar geysers and 24-hour power back-up.

The college features a well-furnished canteen spanning 375 meters, accommodating around 200 people. Additionally, it has a Nescafé and an Amul kiosk, a kiosk called 'Meal Station,' and an outlet of the Mitti Cafe chain, which employs persons with disabilities (PwD). It serves as a social initiative that provides employment to persons with disabilities.

== Admission process ==
Hansraj College undergoes the standard admissions process of the University of Delhi. In order to apply to this college for an undergraduate course, the student has to fill out a central form that is released by the university itself. After a few weeks of the deadline of the forms, Delhi University publicly releases cut off lists for each individual course for all of the undergraduate courses across the university.

Old admission process: A student wishing to apply for a course at Hansraj can look at the cut-off and matches his or her 12th-grade percentage with the same. If the 12th-grade percentage is equal to or greater than the percentage in the cut-off, the student is eligible. Generally, the cutoff percentage lies at ~97% in the 12th Class Finals, this process is officially not applicable after 2022-23 session since the introduction of CUET examination.

New admission process: As there is a change in the admission process due to introduction of CUET examination, the entrance test shall be sole determiner of the admission at any college in University of Delhi including Hansraj College and 12th results shall be considered for eligibility and tie breaker case only (if applicable).

== Sports ==
Its sports facilities include a vast sports field which includes a football field and a basketball court, an indoor sports complex and the only Electronic Shooting Range in the entire University. The college has facilities for both outdoor and indoor games. It has a sports ground and a Basketball court between the college and the hostel premises. It also possess an indoor badminton court and an indoor shooting range. The students have won university, state and national level championships in pistol shooting, archery (w), water polo, basketball, badminton, cricket, etc. The college won the Chancellor's Trophy in 2003–2004, 2004-2005 and for consecutive four academic sessions from 2011 to 2015 for overall excellence in sports. Sport facilities are made available to all students under the program: Games For All and has produced many alumni from sports as well.

== In popular culture ==
The college's picturesque setting and iconic status have made it a popular choice for filmmakers over the years. Some of the films shot here include:

- Band Baaja Baaraat
- Dev.D
- Laal Singh Chaddha
- Sahi Dhandhe Galat Bande
- Tanu Weds Manu Returns
- Ujda Chaman

== Notable alumni ==
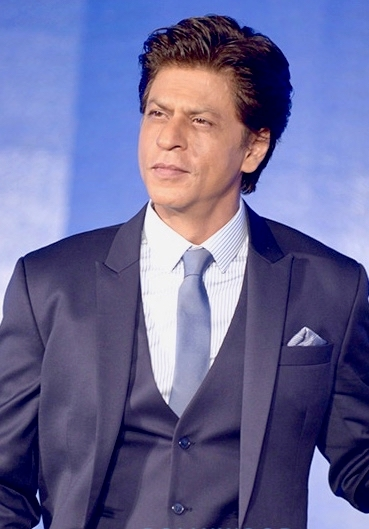
Shah Rukh Khan, actor

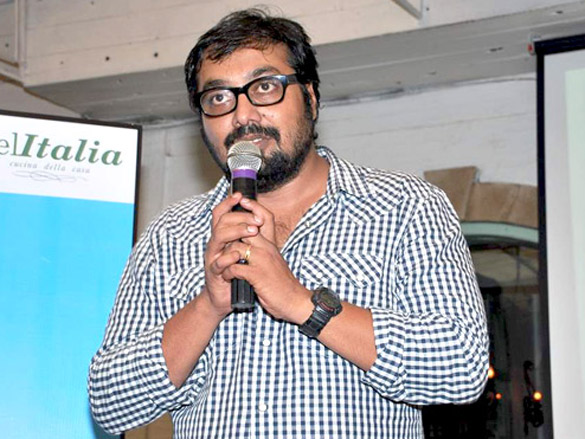
Anurag Kashyap, filmmaker
- Abhinandan Sekhri – entrepreneur, journalist
- Abhinav Kashyap – filmmaker
- Abhishek Verma – Indian archer and Arjuna Award recipient
- Ajay Maken – former MP, former Sports Minister and currently a member of Congress Working Committee
- Ajit Manocha – President and CEO of SEMI and Former CEO of GlobalFoundries
- Akhil Sheoran – Indian sports shooter
- Akram Shah – Indian judoka and Arjuna Award recipient
- Anil Aggrawal – forensic pathologist
- Ankur Mittal – Indian sport shooter and Arjuna Award recipient
- Arun Gemini – writer and poet
- Aarti Bajaj – film editor
- Bhupender Dhawan – first powerlifting coach to receive the Dronacharya Award
- Deepak Rawat, IAS
- Devendra Kumar Joshi – Lieutenant Governor of Andaman and Nicobar Islands, 21st Chief of Naval Staff, and PVSM recipient
- Elvish Yadav, YouTuber
- Gunjan Saxena – flight lieutenant Gunjan Saxena is the first woman Indian Air Force (IAF) officer to enter a war zone.
- Gopal Subramaniam – former Solicitor General of India
- Jagrit Anand, Indian cricketer
- Jai Prakash Agarwal – Member of Parliament, Chairman House Committee, LS Indian Political Party-Congress Party
- KRSNA (rapper), Indian rapper
- Kabir Sadanand – actor, director
- Karm Chawla, Indian cinematographer and director
- Kiren Rijiju – MP, union minister
- Kushal Tandon – actor
- Lobsang Sangay – former Prime Minister of Tibetan government-in-exile
- Maneesh Sharma – film director, producer, and screenwriter
- Mansi Aggarwal, Indian choreographer
- Munish Chandra Puri – mathematician (writer and philosopher)
- Naveen Jindal – Member of Parliament, Chairman of JSPL, and Chancellor of O. P. Jindal Global University
- Palash Sen – actor, medical doctor, musician
- Pallavi Joshi – film and television actress and recipient of three National Film Awards
- Partha Dasgupta – Frank Ramsey Professor (Economics), Cambridge University
- Parvin Dabas – actor
- Pavan Malhotra – actor
- Pooran Chand Joshi – 23rd Pro Vice-Chancellor of University of Delhi
- Prashant Pandey, Indian writer and director
- Prem Nath, Indian freestyle wrestler
- Radha Bhatt – actress
- Rajesh Khattar – actor
- Rajesh Lilothia, Indian politician
- Rajeev Ranjan Prasad, Indian judge
- Rajinder Khanna – Additional National Security Advisor of India and former Secretary of the Research & Analysis Wing
- Ramita Jindal – Indian sport shooter and Olympian
- Rannvijay Singh – actor, VJ MTV India
- Raveesh Kumar – diplomat, former Ministry of External Affairs spokesperson, currently Ambassador of India to Finland and Estonia
- Ravi Kumar – Indian sport shooter
- Richard Rekhy – Chief Executive Officer of KPMG in India
- Rohan Mehra – actor, model
- Sangeeta Malhotra – astrophysicist
- Sanjiv Chopra – Professor of Medicine and former Faculty Dean for Continuing Medical Education at Harvard Medical School
- Sabyasachi Chakrabarty – actor
- Sandeep Chaudhary – para-athlete
- Sharon Verma – comedian
- Sheeba Chadha – actress
- Shiney Ahuja – actor
- Shivani Kataria – Indian swimmer and Olympian
- Shreyasi Singh – Indian sport shooter and Member of Bihar Legislative Assembly
- Subramanian Ramadorai – Former CEO & MD of Tata Consultancy Services, and recipient of Padma Bhushan and CBE
- Sompal Shastri – former Minister for Agriculture and member of Planning Commission
- Sonali Gupta, Indian anthropological archaeologist, Egyptologist, and lawyer
- Sushil Kumar (biologist) – geneticist and Shanti Swarup Bhatnagar Prize recipient
- Sushil Rajpal, Indian director and producer
- Susmit Sen – musician, Indian Ocean
- Tarsem Singh – Indian director and Grammy Award winner
- Vineet Bajpai – founder and CEO of TBWA Worldwide
- Virander Singh Chauhan – former Director of ICGEB, former Chairman of UGC, and Padma Shri awardee
- Viresh Oberoi, former Managing Director and Chief Executive Officer of Mjunction Services
- Vijay Kumar Malhotra – politician BJP Indian Political Party
- Vikramaditya Singh – Member of Legislative Assembly from Shimla Rural constituency
- Vinod Dua – journalist, Ramnath Goenka Excellence in Journalism Award winner, and Padma Shri awardee
- V. K. Dadhwal – ISRO scientist (writer and trainer)
- Yashwant Varma, Indian judge

== See also ==
- St. Stephen's College, Delhi
- Lady Shri Ram College for Women, Delhi
