= Alfred D'Cruz =

Indian journalist (1921–2012)

- Born: 23 November 1921; Saligao, Goa, Portuguese India
- Died: 1 June 2012 (aged 90); Bandra, Mumbai, India
- Education: St. Xavier's College, Mumbai (B.A. Honours in English Literature)
- Occupations: Journalist; historian; author
- Employers: The Times of India; The Sunday Observer; Kuwait Times
- Known for: First Indian sub-editor of The Times of India
- Notable work: Saligao: Focus on a Picturesque Goan Village (1973)
- Children: 4

Alfred D'Cruz (23 November 1921 – 1 June 2012) was an Indian journalist, historian, and author. He is noted for being the first Indian to be employed as a sub-editor at The Times of India in 1947, where he worked for four decades. He was also an editor at The Sunday Observer and the Kuwait Times.

== Early life and education ==
D'Cruz was born on 23 November 1921 in the village of Saligao in Bardez, Goa. Born underweight and in poor health, he was not expected to survive infancy, but he lived to an advanced age. He completed his education at St. Xavier's College, Mumbai, earning a B.A. (Hons) degree in English Literature. During his time as a student from 1942 to 1947, he was inspired by Mahatma Gandhi and Lokmanya Tilak to participate in the Quit India Movement and the student Satyagraha against British colonial rule.

== Career ==
=== The Times of India ===
In 1947, D'Cruz was hired by Sir Francis Low, the British editor of The Times of India, making him the only Indian sub-editor among the British staff at the time. On 15 August 1947, he wrote the front-page headline "India wakes up to a new life" to mark the nation's independence. He served as the Chief Sub-Editor of the newspaper until 1982, overseeing the production of daily editions and working with colleagues such as R. K. Laxman, Mario Miranda, and Girilal Jain. He was the only journalist to substitute for Behram Contractor (known as "Busybee") in writing the "Round & About" column for the Evening News of India. After retiring from the daily news desk, D'Cruz continued with the Times Group as the editor of The Times of India Directory and Year Book (including Who's Who in India). In 1985, he produced a special supplement titled "Down the corridors of Times" to commemorate the newspaper's 147th anniversary, which detailed the history of the publication.

=== Later career ===
Following his tenure at The Times of India, D'Cruz worked as the News Editor for The Sunday Observer in Mumbai from 1986 to 1989. At the age of 67, he moved to the Middle East to join the Kuwait Times as an Assistant Editor. He was working at the newspaper's desk during the Invasion of Kuwait by Iraq in 1990 and was responsible for breaking the news of the invasion to the international community. D'Cruz was later evacuated on a relief flight after living in tents in the Jordanian desert with other Indian expatriates.

== Literary works ==
D'Cruz co-authored the book Saligao: Focus on a Picturesque Goan Village (1973), which was released during the centenary celebrations of the Mae de Deus church. The book, featuring illustrations by Mario Miranda, documents the history and culture of his native village and has been included in the collections of the Library of Congress and several universities in the United States. He also wrote a history of St. Theresa's Parish in Bandra, where he resided.

== Personal life and death ==
D'Cruz was married and had four children: a son, Sunil, and three daughters. One of his daughters, Susheela Soares, also worked at The Times of India. He died on 1 June 2012 in Bandra, Mumbai, at the age of 91.

== Awards ==
- Lifetime Achievement Award for Excellence in Journalism: Awarded posthumously by the Journalist Association of India (JAI) in September 2012.
- Laxmidas Borkar Memorial Award: Awarded posthumously by the Bori Development Trust in 2014.
