= Sushil Kumar (biologist) =

Indian geneticist

- Born: 14 December 1940; Delhi, India
- Died: 2 May 2021 (aged 80); Delhi, India
- Education: University of Delhi; Indian Agricultural Research Institute; Indian Agricultural Research Institute; University of Toronto
- Known for: Studies on Escherichia coli Transcription map of bacteriophage lambda
- Awards: 1962 IARI Gold Medal; 1965 ISGPB Genetics Medal; 1981 Shanti Swarup Bhatnagar Prize; 1986 NASI Distinguished Scientist Award; 2000 FICCI Award; 2000 Om Prakash Bhasin Award; 2002 INSA Shyam Bahadur Saksena Memorial Medal
- Scientific career
- Fields: Genetics
- Workplaces: Indian Agricultural Research Institute; Council of Scientific and Industrial Research; National Botanical Research Institute; National Institute of Plant Genome Research; SKA Institution for Research, Education and Development
- Doctoral advisor: A. T. Natarajan

Sushil Kumar (14 December 1940 – 2 May 2021) was an Indian geneticist and academic, known for his Plant and microbial genetical genomics, especially the studies on Escherichia coli and Lambda phage as well as on the mutants of Rhizobium. He was a former director of the Central Institute of Medicinal and Aromatic Plants of the Council of Scientific and Industrial Research and an elected fellow of the Indian National Science Academy, National Academy of Agricultural Sciences, National Academy of Sciences, India, and Indian Academy of Sciences. The Council of Scientific and Industrial Research, the apex agency of the Government of India for scientific research, awarded him the Shanti Swarup Bhatnagar Prize for Science and Technology, one of the highest Indian science awards, in 1981, for his contributions to biological sciences.

== Biography ==
Sushil Kumar, born on 14 December 1940 in the Indian capital of Delhi, did his schooling at Municipal Primary School and Dayanand Anglo-Vedic Public School, both Delhi-based schools, and graduated in science from Hansraj College, Delhi in 1960. He joined the Indian Agricultural Research Institute (IARI) for his post graduate studies from where he obtained his master's degree (MSc) in 1962 under the guidance of S. Ramanujam and continued his research there, mentored by A. T. Natarajan, to secure a doctoral degree (PhD) in 1965. He did his post-doctoral research under M. S. Swaminathan, the pioneer of Indian Green Revolution, during 1965–66 and continued his research in the US at Cold Spring Harbor Laboratory with Paul Margolin from 1966 to 1968, at University of Wisconsin-Madison with Wacław Szybalski from 1968 to 1970 and at University of Toronto with C. R. Fuerst from 1970 to 1971.

Returning to India in 1971, Kumar joined the Indian Agricultural Research Institute as a geneticist and senior scientist where he served till 1989, serving as the professor of Molecular biology and Agricultural biotechnology from 1985 onward. Moving to the Council of Scientific and Industrial Research (CSIR) as a senior grade scientist in 1989, he became the director of the Central Institute of Medicinal and Aromatic Plants in 1993, superannuating in that position in 2000. During his tenure at CSIR, he also held the directorship of two subsidiaries, the Human Resource Development Group in 1997 and the National Botanical Research Institute during 1998–99. Post his official retirement, he continued his association with CSIR as an emeritus scientist from 2001 to 2005 when he moved to the National Institute for Plant Genome Research, an autonomous institute under the Department of Biotechnology as an INSA Senior Scientist in 2006, holding the position till 2010. He has been associated with the SKA Institution for Research, Education and Development since 2012 where he continues his researches.

== Legacy ==
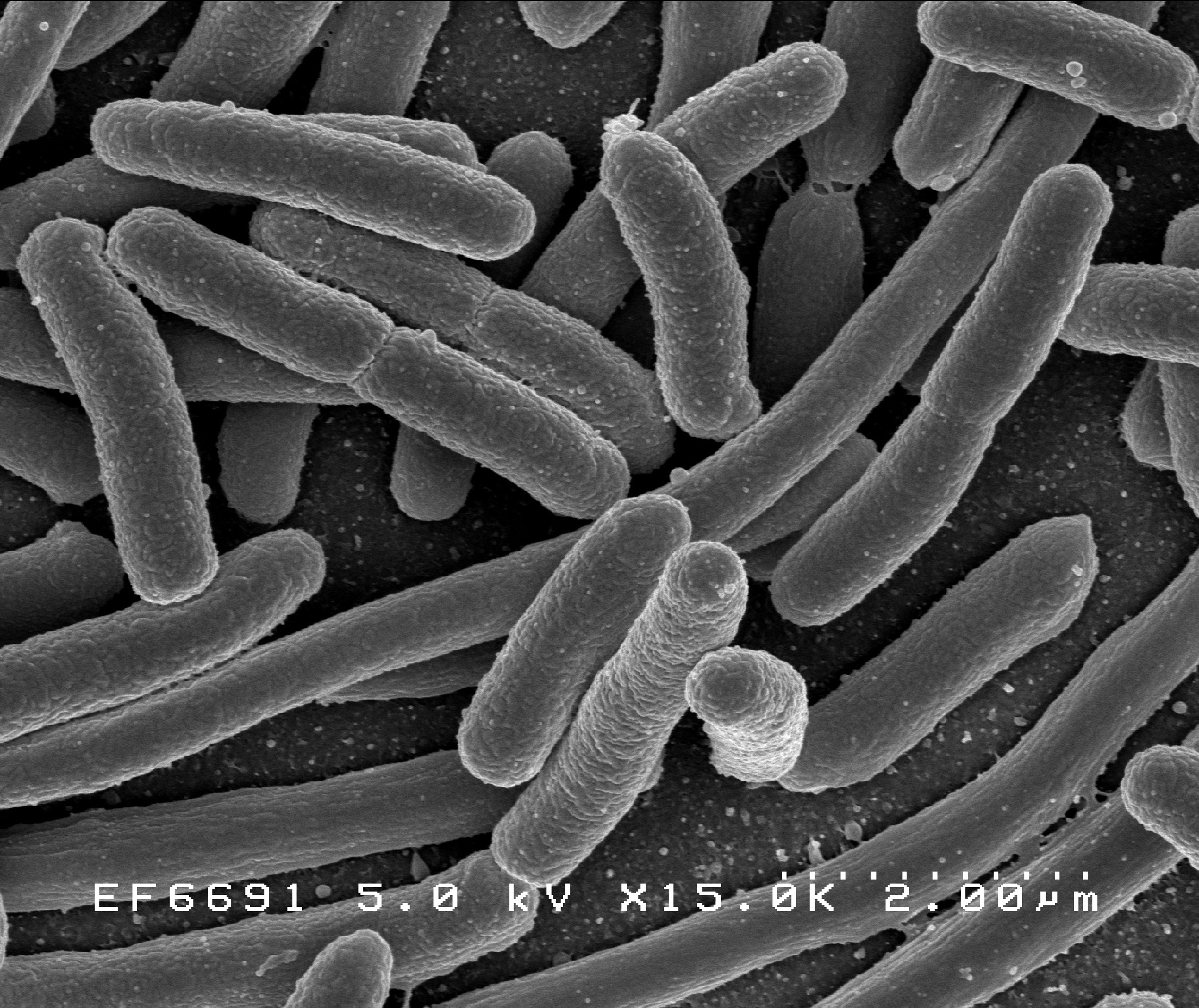
Escherichia Coli

The researches of Sushil Kumar which focused on the fields of plant and microbial genetical genomics are reported to have assisted in a wider understanding of biotechnology and crop breeding. His early researches helped in the discovery of structural arrangement of chromosomes in the interphase nucleus and later, working on Escherichia coli and its bacteriophage Lambda, he described its transcription map. He elucidated the pleiotropic functions of cyclic AMP in Escherichia coli and elaborated on the antitermination and antiparallel transcription and transcription termination sites of Lambda phage. He is known to have discovered new genes in Rhizobium, a nitrogen-fixing soil bacteria and developed its mutants which has higher nitrogen fixing capabilities, thus contributing to augmenting the cultivation of crops such as Pisum sativum (Pea), Catharanthus roseus (Madagascar periwinkle) and Triticum aestivum (Wheat). His work also helped in the genetic improvement which yielded higher levels of artemisinin in Artemisia annua (Sweet wormwood) and essential oil in Mentha arvensis (Wild mint). His researches have been documented by way of over 300 articles and 25 books and he has received 80 international and 52 Indian patents for his work.

In 1971, Kumar founded the molecular genetics laboratory of the Indian Agricultural Research Institute (Note: The laboratory grew to become the Biotechnology Centre in 1985 and the National Research Centre on Plant Biotechnology in 1993.) and later, contributed to the introduction of an academic course in molecular genetics at the institute. During his tenure at the Central Institute of Medicinal and Aromatic Plants, he established a regional field station of the institute at Uttaranchal and founded a central Genetic Resources and Biotechnology Laboratory. A former president of the Indian Society of Genetics and Plant Breeding (1994–97), he started the Journal of Medicinal and Aromatic Plant Sciences during his tenure as the president. He was associated with several other science journals such as Journal of Genetics, Indian Journal of Genetics and Plant Breeding, Indian Journal of Experimental Biology and Proceedings of Indian National Science Academy and mentored 32 doctoral scholars in their researches.

== Awards and honors ==
Sushil Kumar received the Gold Medal from the Indian Agricultural Research Institute in 1962 and the Genetics Medal of the Indian Society of Genetics and Plant Breeding in 1965. The Council of Scientific and Industrial Research awarded him the Shanti Swarup Bhatnagar Prize, one of the highest Indian science awards, in 1981. The National Academy of Sciences, India awarded him the Distinguished Scientist Award in 1986 and he received two awards in 2000, the FICCI Science Award of the Federation of Indian Chambers of Commerce and Industry and the Om Prakash Bhasin Award. The Shyam Bahadur Saksena Memorial Medal of INSA reached him in 2002 and in 2003, he delivered the Dr. B. P. Pal Memorial Lecture of the National Academy of Sciences, India. The Indian Academy of Sciences elected him as their fellow in 1981 and the National Academy of Agricultural Sciences followed suit in 1992. A year later, he was elected as a fellow by the National Academy of Sciences, India and he became an elected fellow of the Indian National Science Academy in 1995.

== See also ==
- M. S. Swaminathan
- Wacław Szybalski
