= Mallappa =

Mallappa may refer to

- Kollur Mallappa (1905 – 2004), Indian Politician from Hyderabad-Karnataka
- Kannavara Mallappa (1928 – 2020), Indian Politician from Davanagere, Karnataka
- Kuttur Mallappa, Indian Politician from Kodagu, Karnataka
- Mallappa Dhanshetty (1898 – 1931), Indian freedom fighter
