= Rajeev Ranjan Prasad =

Indian Jurist & High Court Judge (born 1966)

Judge at Patna High Court
- In office 22 May 2017 – 4 September 2028
- Nominated by: Collegium of the Supreme Court of India
- Appointed by: Pranab Mukherjee

Personal details
- Born: 5 September 1966 (age 60) Tarhari, Lakhisarai district, Bihar
- Children: 2
- Parent(s): Shri Umesh Prasad Singh (Father), Smt. Laxmi Singh (Mother)
- Education: Patna University (B.Com) Hansraj College, University of Delhi (Special Certificate Course in Commerce) Campus Law Centre, University of Delhi (LL.B)
- Occupation: Judge
- Profession: Law, Judiciary
- Website: https://patnahighcourt.gov.in/judge/MzE4-a5MCvbTHYcU=

Rajeev Ranjan Prasad (born 5 September 1966) is an Indian jurist serving as the judge of the Patna High Court. He was appointed to the position on 22 May 2017. Prior to his elevation, he practiced as an advocate at the Patna High Court, handling constitutional, civil, and financial matters.

== Early life and education ==
Rajeev Ranjan Prasad was born on 5 September 1966 in Tarhari, Lakhisarai district, Bihar, into a family with a legal background. His father, Umesh Prasad Singh, was a Senior Advocate at the Patna High Court. He completed his early education in Patna before pursuing a Bachelor of Commerce (B.Com.) from Patna University. He then enrolled in Hansraj College, University of Delhi, for a Special Certificate Course in Commerce, where he secured the first position in first division. After briefly joining the Delhi School of Economics for postgraduate studies, he decided to pursue law and obtained an LL.B. degree from the Campus Law Centre, University of Delhi, in 1991.

== Career ==
After completing his legal education, Prasad enrolled as an advocate and began practicing at the Patna High Court. His legal practice included handling cases related to corporate affairs, financial disputes, and government policies. On 22 May 2017, he was appointed as a Judge of the Patna High Court by the President of India, following a recommendation from the Collegium of the Supreme Court of India.

== Notable judgments ==
During his tenure as a judge, Justice Prasad has delivered several significant rulings:

- Bank Loan Recovery Case (2023): He ruled that banks and financial institutions cannot forcibly seize vehicles using recovery agents without following Reserve Bank of India (RBI) guidelines and due legal process.
- 1997 Murder Case Acquittal (2024): As part of a Division Bench, he upheld the acquittal of three women accused of murder, citing inconsistencies in witness testimonies and lack of medical evidence.

== See also ==
- Patna High Court
- Judiciary of India
- Supreme Court of India
