= Solapur =

City in Maharashtra, India

Solapur Sholapur
- City
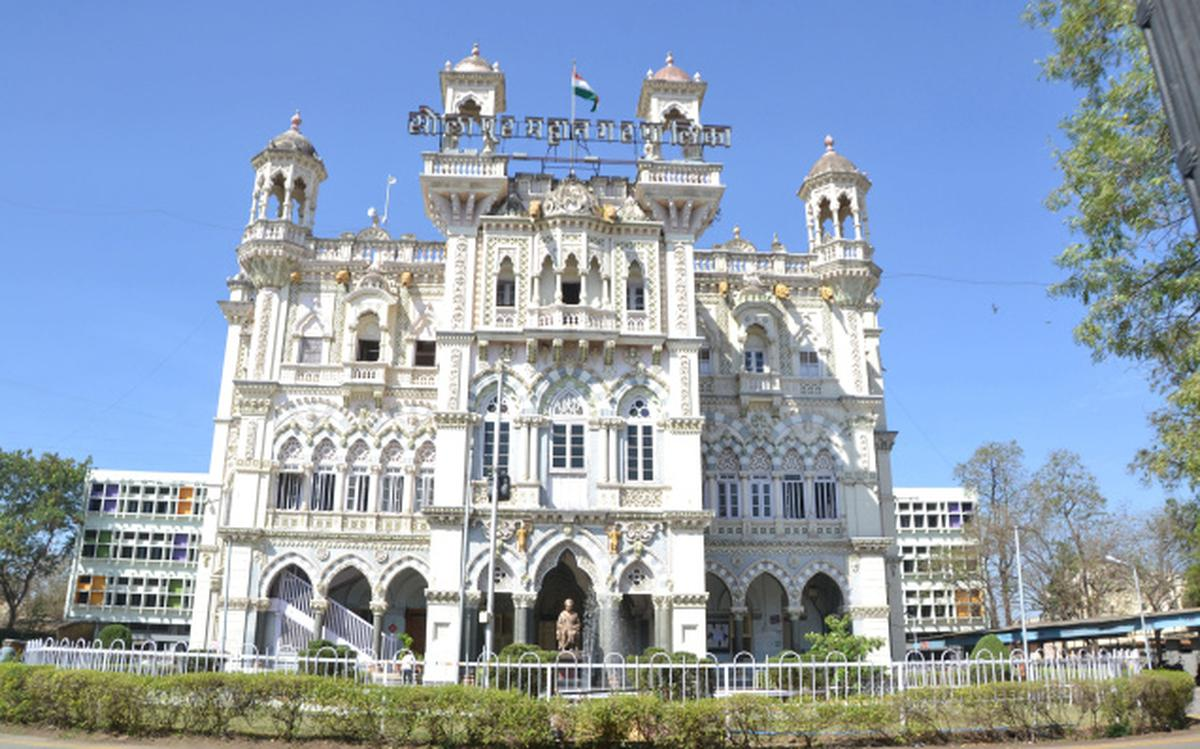
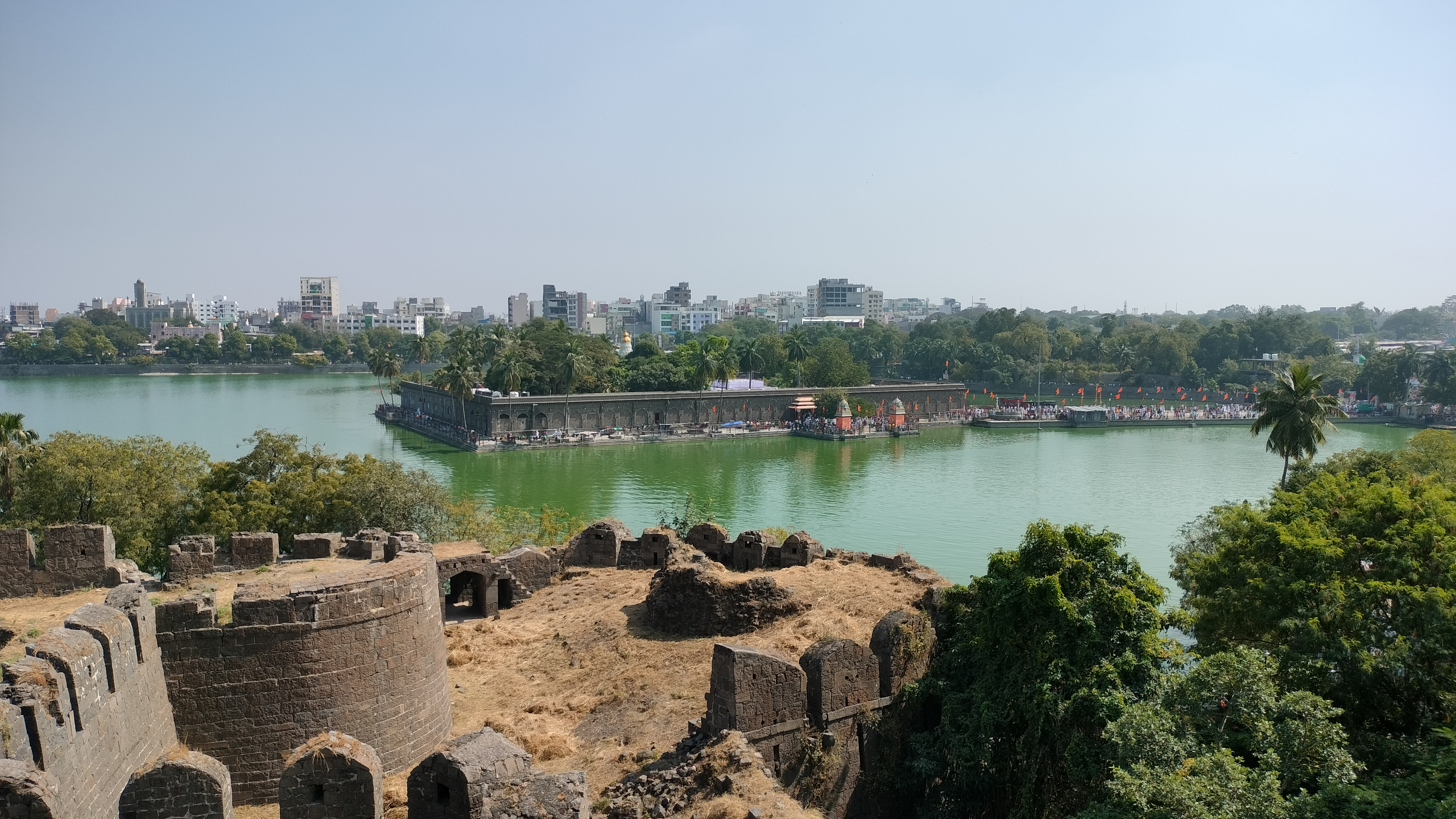
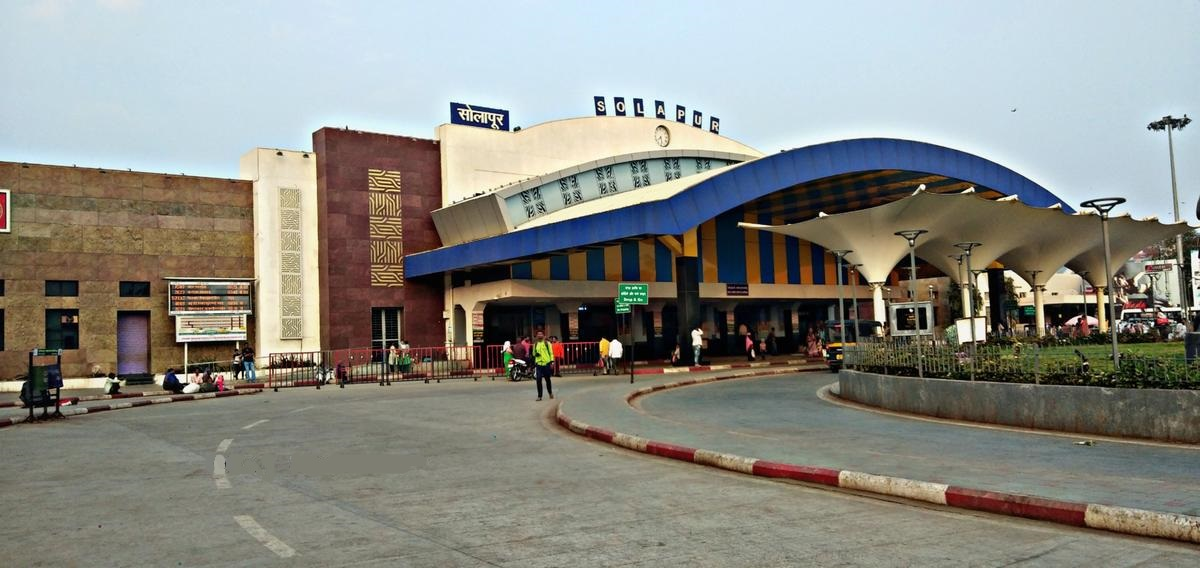
- Solapur Municipal Corporation Building, Siddheshwar Mandir View from Solapur Fort, Solapur railway station
- Nickname: Sonnalagi
- Interactive map of Solapur
- Location of Solapur in Maharashtra Solapur (India)
- Coordinates: 17°40′13″N 75°54′04″E
- Country: India
- Region: Western India
- State: Maharashtra
- District: Solapur
- Named for: Sixteen Villages

Government
  - Type: Municipal Corporation
  - Body: Solapur Municipal Corporation
  - Mayor: Vinayak Kondyal (BJP)
  - Deputy Mayor: Dnyaneshwari Devkar (BJP)
  - MLAs: Devendra Kothe (Solapur City Central); Vijay Deshmukh (Solapur City North); Subhash Deshmukh (Solapur South)

Area
  - City: 98.67 km^{2} (38.10 sq mi)
  - Metro: 178.60 km^{2} (68.96 sq mi)
- Elevation: 457 m (1,499 ft)

Population (2011)
  - City: 951,118
  - Rank: India: 49th Maharashtra: 11th
  - Density: 9,639/km^{2} (24,970/sq mi)
- Demonym: Solapurkar
- Time zone: UTC+5:30 (IST)
- PIN: 413001; 413009
- Telephone code: 0217
- Vehicle registration: MH-13 (Solapur city); MH-45 (Solapur(Akluj) ) MH-62(Solapur rural )
- Sex ratio: 52/48 ♂/♀
- Literacy Rate: 83.88%
- Gross domestic product: INR 136212.76 crores (2023-24)
- Website: solapurcorporation.gov.in

Solapur is a city located in the south-western region of the Indian state of Maharashtra, close to its border with Karnataka. Solapur is located on a major highway, rail routes between Mumbai, Pune, Bangalore and Hyderabad, with a branch line to the cities of Kalaburagi and Vijayapura in the neighbouring state of Karnataka. Solapur Airport (SSE) was inaugurated on 29 September 2024. It is classified as A1 Tier and B-1 class city by House Rent Allowance (HRA) classification by the Government of India. It is the seventh biggest Metropolis Urban Agglomeration and 11th most populated city in Maharashtra as well as 43rd largest urban agglomeration and 49th most populous city in India.

Solapur leads Maharashtra in production of beedi (a type of cigarette). Solapuri Chadars and towels are famous not only in India but also at a global level, however there has been a significant decline in their exports due to quality issues. "Solapuri chadars" are the first product in Maharashtra to get a Geographical Indication tag It has been a leading centre for cotton mills and power looms in Maharashtra. Solapur had the world's second-largest and Asia's largest spinning mill. The National Research Centre on Pomegranate (NRCP) of India is located in Solapur. and pomegranate farming is done on a large scale in Solapur city. The Science Centre in Kegaon (Solapur) is the third largest and prominent scientific association in Maharashtra. The Raichur-Solapur Power Transmission line of 765 kV power capacity suffices the power grid accessing need of the southern states of Karanataka and Telangana. The first waste-to-energy electricity plant in Maharashtra is situated in Solapur.

The Gramadevata (Chief deity) of the city is Shri Shivyogi Siddheshwar. The "Nandi-dhawaj" procession on the Hindu festival of Makar Sankranti and on account of it an annual fair locally known as Gadda Yatra attracts large crowds and is associated with the marriage of Lord Siddheshwar. Solapur has the Great Indian Bustard Sanctuary.

== Etymology ==
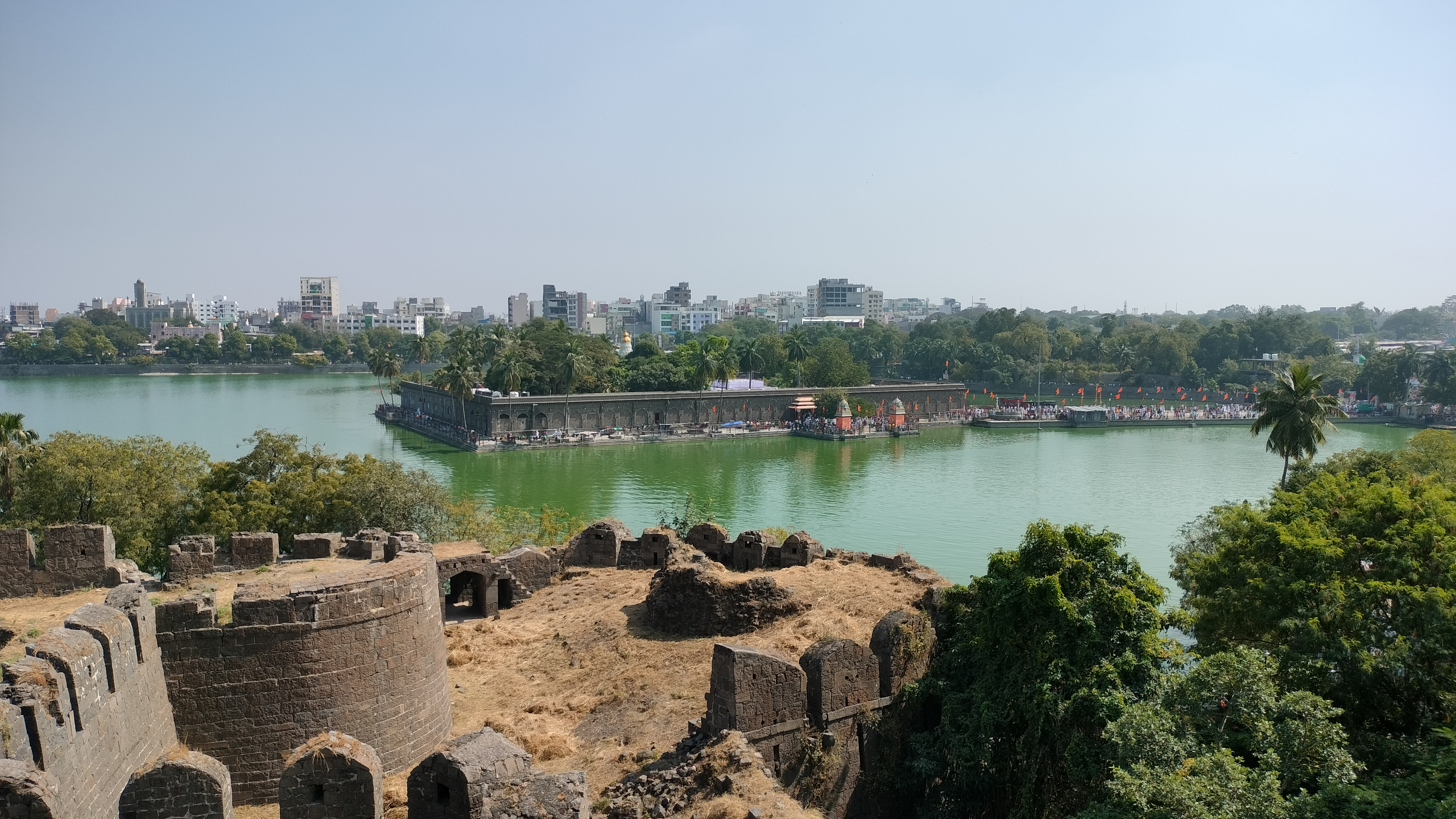
Shri Siddheshwar Temple viewed from Solapur Fort

The Solapur (anciently called sonnalage) District was ruled by various dynasties such as Andhrabhratyas, Chalukyas, Rashtrakutas, Yadavas and Bahamanis. 'Solapur' spelled in (Marathi: सोलापूर is believed to be derived from the combination of two words: Sola / सोला in Marathi means "sixteen" and "Pura / पुर" means "village".

The present city of Solapur was considered to be spread over sixteen villages viz. Aadilpur, Ahmedpur, Chapaldev, Fatehpur, Jamdarwadi, Kalajapur, Khadarpur, Khandervkiwadi, Muhammadpur, Ranapur, Sandalpur, Shaikpur, Solapur, Sonallagi, Sonapur and Vaidakwadi and all these villages are now merged with Solapur Municipal Corporation.

The inscriptions of chief deity of Solapur Shivyogi Shri. Siddheshwar of the time of the Kalachuri (Basavakalyan) suggest that the town was called "Sonnalage" which came to be pronounced as "Sonnalagi". A Sanskrit inscription dated Shake 1238, after the downfall of the Yadavas found at Kamati in Mohol shows that the town was known as Sonalipur. One of the inscriptions found in Solapur fort shows that the town was called Sonalpur. It was the main commercial hub of the Devagiri Yadavas and an important trading city. The town was known as Sonnalagi even up to the times of the Yadavas of Devagiri.

It is evident from the inscriptions of Shivayogi Lord Siddheshwar of the time of the Kalachuristis of Kalyani, that the town was called 'Sonnalage', an old Kannada name, which came to be pronounced as 'Sonnalagi'. The town was known as Sonnalagi even up to the times of Yadavas. A Sanskrit inscription dated (Sanskrit:शके १२३८) Śakē 1238, after the downfall of the Yadavas found at Kamati in Mohol shows that the town was known as Sonalipur.

== History ==
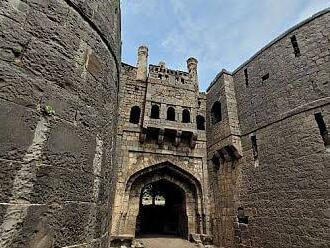
Solapur Fort

One of the inscriptions found in Solapur fort shows that the town was called Sonalpur while another inscription on the well in the fort shows that it was known as Sandalpur. Subsequently, the British rulers pronounced Solapur as Solapur and hence the name of the district. The present Solapur district was previously part of Ahmednagar, Pune and Satara districts. In 1838 it became the Sub-district of Ahmednagar. It included Barshi, Mohol, Madha, Karmala, Indi, Hippargi and Muddebihal Sub-divisions. In 1864 this Sub-district was abolished. In 1871 this district was reformed joining the Sub-divisions viz. Solapur, Barshi, Mohol, Madha and Karmala and two Subdivisions of Satara district viz. Pandharpur, Sangola and in 1875 Malshiras Sub-division was also attached. After the State reorganisation in 1956 Solapur was included in Bombay State and it became a full-fledged district of Maharashtra State in 1960.

The municipal corporation building was built by Rao Saheb Mallappa Warad. He was also one of the first to bring the farming tractor to India. It was his wish that the building should be used for some public purpose and thus the building was made the municipal council. The building is also called Indra Bhawan which means 'Abode of Indra' (Lord Indra). Mallappa Warad was also one of the ten members of 'Chamber of Merchants' under Queen Victoria.

The Solapur Municipal Council was the first municipal council to hoist the indian national flag on the Municipal Council building in 1930. Taking the spirit of Dandi March from Mahatma Gandhi, the freedom fighters of Solapur hoisted the National Flag on 6 April 1930 on the Municipal Council building. This was the first and the unique incidence of such kind throughout the country.

During the Indian independence movement, the people of Solapur enjoyed full freedom on 9–11 May 1930. However, this resulted in the executions of Mallappa Dhanshetti, Abdul Rasool Qurban Hussein, Jagannath Bhagwan Shinde and Shrikisan Laxminarayan Sarada, who were hanged by the British Government on 12 January 1931, in the prison at Pune. This resulted in the city becoming recognized as "The City of Hutatmas" literally "The City of Martyrs".

Tehsils of Solapur District. The north and south tehsils forms the city

The Padmashalis are one of the largest communities in Solapur. The rise of Moghul rule and thereafter the Britishers who came to India for doing cloth business has had a lot of impact on weaving technology. The cloth manufactured at Birmingham, England can sell at cheaper rate in India and the qualities of their cloth were much better than our hand woven cloths on Gunta Maggam (Pit-loom). Since there is no buyer for our hand woven cloths, the domestic textile industry suffered losses. The Britisher established East India Company at Calcutta and spread their business across the India. They have also ruled our country till 1947. The impact of cloth business compelled Padmashalis to move to different places in India. Maharashtra is adjacent to Telangana, Andhra Pradesh; most of them started moving in search of their livelihood. Earlier days there were no transportation available; people started walking from Telangana and stayed for days together wherever in the en route to Mumbai. In this course some of them even settled in most parts of Maharashtra like Nanded, Jalna, Aurangabad, and Nasik, Ahmednagar, Solapur, Pune and even interior parts of the villages. Their basic occupation was weaving; hence most of them have chosen weaving job in cotton mills. Gradually the strength has increased and it can be witnessed that about 400 to 500 Padmashalis could be seen in each mill in Mumbai. Most of the people in Solapur are started there Textile.

There is also one of the oldest Ganesh temples, Manacha Shri Ajoba Ganpati temple, which started celebrating the Ganesh festival from 1885.Lokmanya Tilak is inspired from this as peoples are coming and doing activities as a group, when he visited Solapur and then he started Ganesh Festival in Pune in 1893.

== Culture ==
Solapur is a city with tri-linguistic blend of Marathi, Kannada and Telugu language multi-cultural features. Most of the People follow Marathi Culture and Tradition. It also has cultural impact of neighbouring states Karnataka and Telangana.

== Demographics ==
Religions in Solapur City (2011)
Religion	Percent
Hinduism	75.73%
Islam	20.64%
Buddhism	1.62%
Jainism	1.00%
Christianity	0.73%
Other or not stated	0.28%

As per 2011 census of Solapur city, the population of Solapur in 2011 was 951,558. Solapur has a sex ratio of 978 females per 1000 males and a literacy rate of 82.80%. 11.49% of the population is under 6 years of age. Scheduled Castes and Scheduled Tribes make up 14.51% and 1.89% of the population respectively.

Language in Solapur City (2011)
1. Marathi (42.3%)
2. Telugu (17.0%)
3. Kannada (12.7%)
4. Hindi (11.9%)
5. Urdu (11.3%)
6. Vadari (1.05%)
7. Others (3.79%)

At the time of the 2011 census, 42.29% of the population spoke Marathi, 17.03% Telugu, 12.67% Kannada, 11.89% Hindi, 11.28% Urdu and 1.05% Vadari as their first language.

Solapur's population, with the inclusion of its suburbs, increased to 1,250,000 reorganized in 2012. (http://solapur.gov.in/htmldocs/1977/people_population.html, http://www.censusindia.gov.in/2011census/C-16.html)

== Geography and climate ==
Climate data for Solapur (1991–2020, extremes 1901–present)
Month	Jan	Feb	Mar	Apr	May	Jun	Jul	Aug	Sep	Oct	Nov	Dec	Year
Record high °C (°F)	36.7 (98.1)	39.5 (103.1)	43.9 (111.0)	44.9 (112.8)	46.0 (114.8)	45.6 (114.1)	38.9 (102.0)	40.0 (104.0)	38.0 (100.4)	38.5 (101.3)	36.1 (97.0)	36.3 (97.3)	46.0 (114.8)
Mean daily maximum °C (°F)	31.7 (89.1)	34.4 (93.9)	37.9 (100.2)	40.2 (104.4)	40.4 (104.7)	35.2 (95.4)	32.1 (89.8)	31.6 (88.9)	32.2 (90.0)	32.9 (91.2)	32.2 (90.0)	31.3 (88.3)	34.4 (93.9)
Daily mean °C (°F)	24.0 (75.2)	26.5 (79.7)	30.0 (86.0)	32.7 (90.9)	32.9 (91.2)	29.1 (84.4)	27.3 (81.1)	26.9 (80.4)	27.0 (80.6)	26.8 (80.2)	25.4 (77.7)	23.5 (74.3)	27.7 (81.8)
Mean daily minimum °C (°F)	16.0 (60.8)	18.2 (64.8)	21.7 (71.1)	24.6 (76.3)	25.2 (77.4)	23.4 (74.1)	22.6 (72.7)	22.0 (71.6)	22.0 (71.6)	20.7 (69.3)	18.1 (64.6)	15.6 (60.1)	20.8 (69.4)
Record low °C (°F)	4.4 (39.9)	6.1 (43.0)	12.2 (54.0)	13.9 (57.0)	16.1 (61.0)	17.2 (63.0)	16.7 (62.1)	15.0 (59.0)	15.9 (60.6)	12.4 (54.3)	7.8 (46.0)	6.7 (44.1)	4.4 (39.9)
Average rainfall mm (inches)	3.7 (0.15)	2.9 (0.11)	10.0 (0.39)	17.4 (0.69)	35.6 (1.40)	111.1 (4.37)	121.4 (4.78)	122.8 (4.83)	154.3 (6.07)	106.9 (4.21)	17.4 (0.69)	3.1 (0.12)	706.7 (27.82)
Average rainy days	0.2	0.2	1.0	1.8	2.5	6.8	7.8	8.8	8.3	5.7	1.1	0.3	44.2
Average relative humidity (%) (at 17:30 IST)	33	28	25	24	28	51	61	60	58	48	40	36	40
Source 1: India Meteorological Department
Source 2: Tokyo Climate Center (mean temperatures 1991–2020)

Solapur is located at 17.68°N 75.92°E. It has an average elevation of 458 metres (1502 feet). It is bordered by Ahmednagar district on the north; Osmanabad district on the north and northeast.

Kalaburagi district on the southeast and Bijapur Districts on the south of Karnataka State, Sangli district on the south and southwest; Satara district on the west, and Pune district on the northwest. It is situated at a distance of 410 km (250 mi) from the Maharashtra State Capital of Mumbai by road and train.

Solapur is at a distance of 245 km (152 mi) from Pune and 305 km (190 mi) from Hyderabad. Solapur is situated on the Deccan Plateau.

Solapur falls under the category of dry (arid and semiarid) climate according to the Köppen climate classification. The city experiences three distinct seasons: summer, monsoon and winter. Typical summer months are from March to May, with maximum temperatures ranging from 30 to 45 °C (86 to 113 °F). The warmest months in Solapur are April and May. The typical maximum temperatures being 40 °C (104 °F) or more. The highest temperature ever recorded is 46.0 °C (114.8 °F) in May 1988. Although summer does not end until May or even the midst of June, the city often receives locally developed heavy thundershowers in May (although humidity remains high). The monsoon lasts from June to the end of September, with moderate rainfall. The city of Solapur receives an average rainfall of 545 mm (21.5 in) per year. Winter begins in November and lasts until the end of February, with the temperatures occasionally dropping below 10 °C (50 °F). Solapur lies very close to the seismically active zone around Killari, Latur District, about 100 km (62 mi) east of the city.

Solapur has been ranked 20th best "National Clean Air City" under (Category 2 3-10L Population cities) in India.

== Civic administration ==
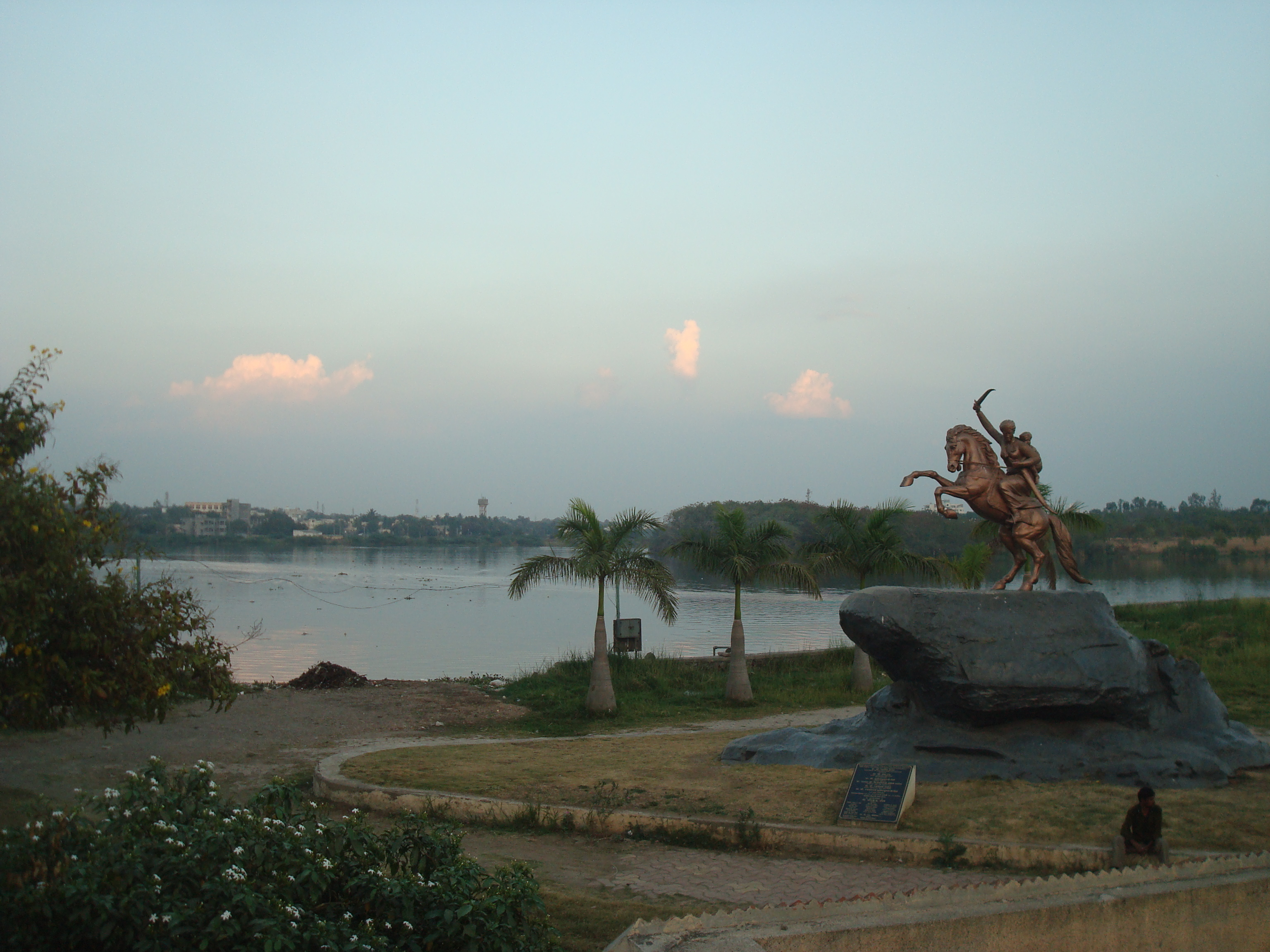
Kambar Talav (lake), also known as Sambhaji Talav (lake)

The civic administration of the city is managed by the Solapur Municipal Corporation, which was established on the Maharashtra Day of 1 May 1964 in the building constructed by Mallappa Warad in 1930. The corporation oversees the engineering works, health, sanitation, water supply, administration and taxation in the city. It is headed by a mayor who is assisted by municipal commissioner and elected representatives. The city is divided into 135 wards and 6 zones. The corporation members also known as corporators are elected by the citizens of Solapur every five years. The corporators, in turn, elect the mayor. Its activities include developing new layouts and roads, town-planning and land-acquisition. As Solapur is one of the most important city for the transportation towards south and north India, here it's essential for the State and Central Government to develop this District.

=== Municipal finance ===
According to financial data published on the CityFinance Portal of the Ministry of Housing and Urban Affairs, the Solapur Municipal Corporation reported total revenue receipts of ₹725 crore (US$87 million) and total expenditure of ₹764 crore (US$92 million) in 2022–23. Tax revenue accounted for about 39.0% of the total revenue, while the corporation received ₹308 crore in grants during the financial year.

== Sports ==
- Tennis - Annually women's professional tennis ITF Championship held at Solapur, it is known as Solapur Open women's ITF $25K Tennis tournament. It is hard Court tournament, happens at outdoor tennis courts. It is grade T2 championship. 2021 US Open championship Emma Raducanu participated in it in 2019.
- Cricket - Indira Gandhi Stadium in Solapur, formerly known as Park Stadium, hosts Ranji Trophy matches and is the home venue for Maharashtra cricket team.
- Wrestling - Indian styled wrestling is played in this town and town's wrestlers emerged as victorious in state level tournaments.

== Economy ==
Solapur is located at an important junction of the north–south railway line which provides good transportation infrastructure for trade and industry. There are a number of medium and small-scale industries found in the district, and it is one of the prime centers of the handloom and powerloom industry, cotton mills and the beedi industry. Rapier Terry Towels is now also an emerging industry in Solapur. Solapur is well known for the bed sheets produced here and has a reputation for the same. Textiles are an important aspect of the economy. As the epic growing part in the industrial sector, Sanghvi Towels are known as the parents of Rapier industries. They introduced the city how to go with the flow of changing demands of the Terry Towels market, following it many business houses have changed to Rapier Industries and now Rapier Chaddar Looms have been also introduced to the weaving sector by Bomdyal Textiles. The city is home to Precision Camshafts Limited one of the largest manufacturers in camshafts in the world. In the agricultural field, the district has a well-established market in oilseeds.

=== Agriculture ===
The major crops grown in the district include jowar, wheat and sugarcane. There is one sugar factory near the city located at hotagi.

=== Industries ===
City has MIDC located at chincholi kati. There are many industries in MIDC such as Laxmi Hydraulics (LHP), Precision camshafts, Thermax, Kirloskar Ferrous, Balaji amines etc.

=== Commercial Hub ===
City is also known for best medical facilities and hospitals, as people come from neighborhood districts such as Osmanabad, Vijaypura(KA), Kalaburagi(KA). There are many engineering and diploma colleges, known for educational hub including Government Polytechnic, WIT college.

=== Leisure Destinations ===
There are many recreational facilities/spaces in and around city for public, such as Hipparga lake, Sambhaji lake, Hotgi lake, waterpark at hipparga, Mohini waterpark, Just Bounce Entertainment Park, Shower N Tower waterpark, Mahatma Gandhi Zoo, etc.

== Tourism ==
Solapur is one of tourist destination known for Shri Siddheshwar Swami Temple, Bhuikot Fort, etc.

== Environment ==
Solapur is one of the most-polluted cities in Maharashtra due to the effluent chemicals produced as the waste products from the textile industries in its region. As many vehicles in the city utilise diesel fuel, it also generates tremendous smog emitted by sugar factories and heavy textiles industries in the city's suburb. Various efforts are being made by Maharashtra Pollution Control Board (MPCB) to reduce air pollution and its environmental effects. The city has launched a GO-GREEN scheme by planting trees in the city and developing greenery with the help of various eco-friendly people in the city. CNG will be available shortly soon in MIDC Chincholi and some major area in Solapur .

== Transport ==
=== Rail ===
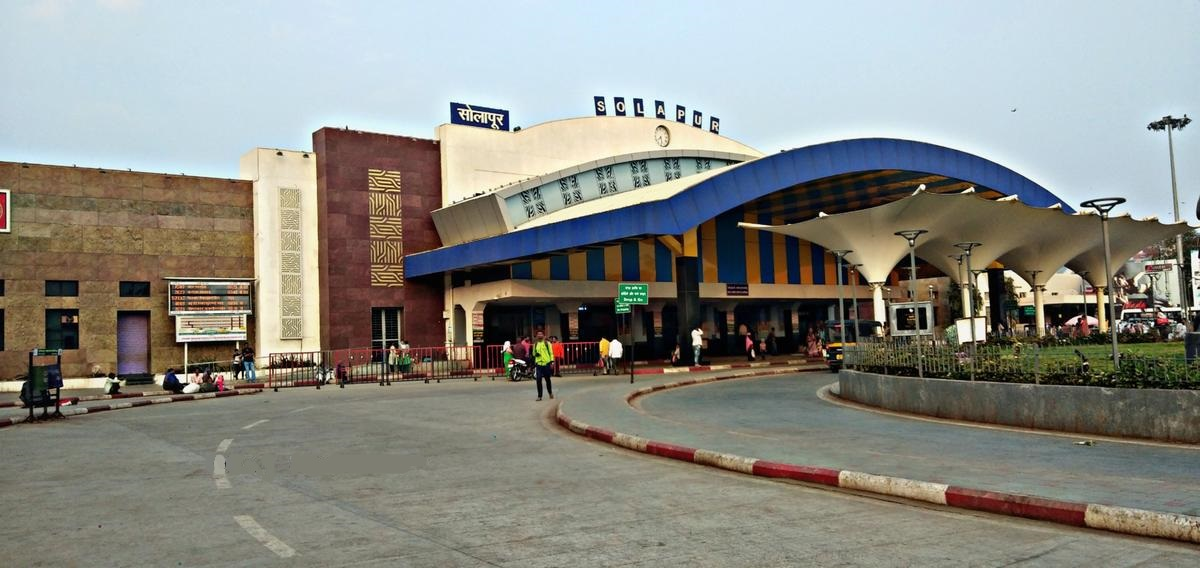
Main entrance of Solapur Railway Station

Solapur railway station is the main railway hub within the city. The Solapur Railway Division is an important division connecting South India to Western & North west India. Trains from Ahmedabad, Jaipur, New Delhi, Mumbai, Pune etc., ply to Southern states (Telangana, Karnataka, Tamil Nadu & Kerala) via Solapur.Government has decided to make solapur railway station as the high tech station in Maharashta.

Hotgi Junction and Kurduvadi Junction are two junction railway stations present in the Solapur district.

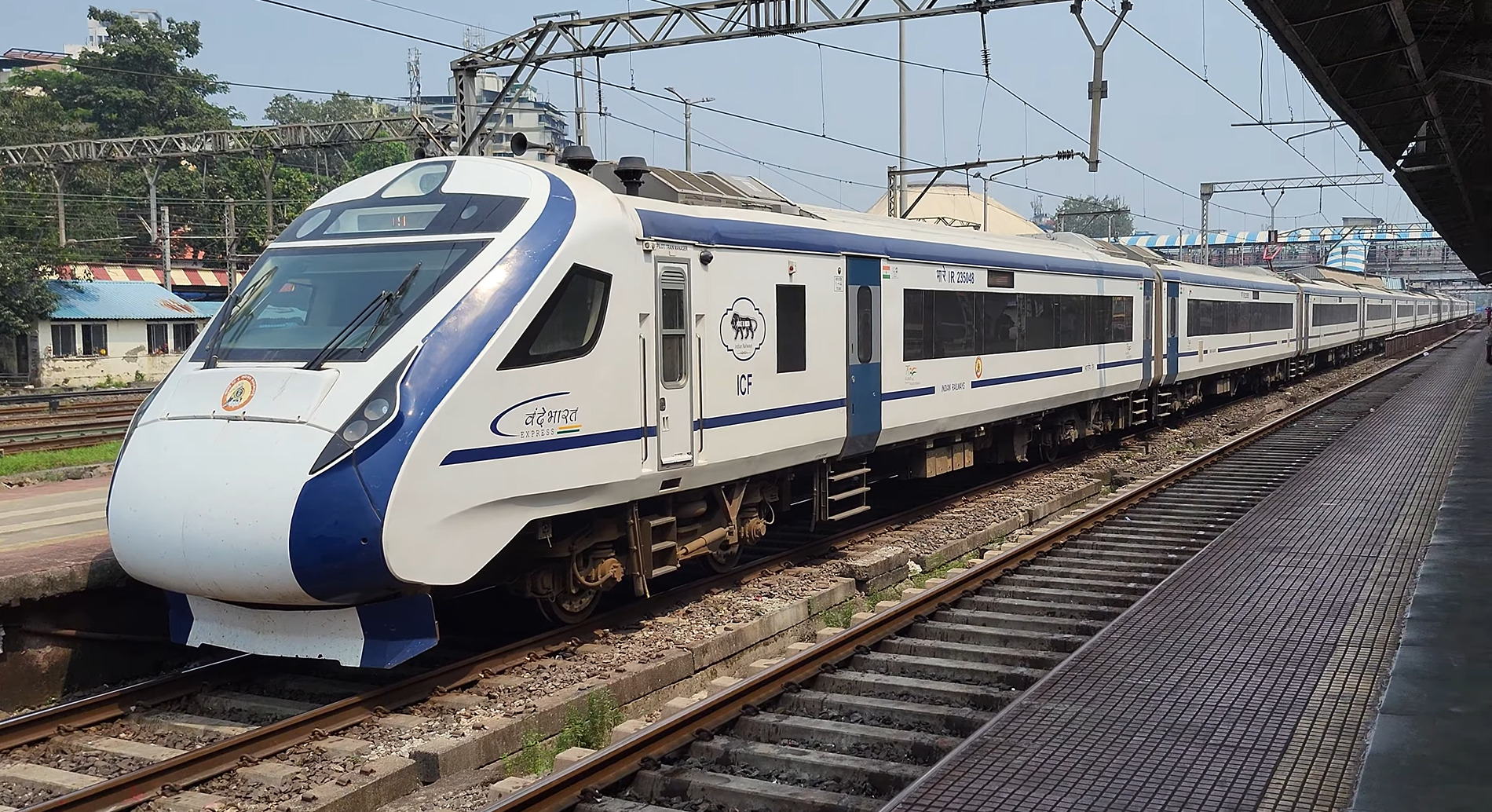
Solapur Mumbai Vande Bharat Express

=== Road ===
Solapur is well connected by road with major cities of Maharashtra as well as the adjoining State Capital of Hyderabad and important cities in Karnataka by four National Highways – NH 9 highway connecting Pune with Vijaywada via Hyderabad but the Solapur-Omerga stretch of NH65 is a bit uncomfortable as the quality of roads still remains below par/Under construction, Suryapet, NH-52 connecting Solapur to Kaithal, Mangalore, Karnataka and NH-211 connecting Solapur to Dhule. Ratnagiri-Nagpur National highway NH-204 passes through city, connecting Solapur to other important cities in Maharashtra like Nagpur, Sangli, Kolhapur and Nanded. Recently sanctioned National Highways- (Solapur - Kalaburagi) and Ratnagiri-Solapur-Nanded-Yavatmal-Nagpur. (Solapur-Bijapur) Road section in NH-13 is proposed to be improved by its four laning. The Solapur-Aurangabad national highway project is completed recently and the new four laning has reduced the time and cost in travelling from Solapur to Aurangabad.

Solapur internal city transport is managed by SMT (Solapur Municipal Transport), but the buses operated by SMT are limited to less than 25 buses.

=== Air ===
Solapur Airport (IATA code: SSE) is located to the south of Solapur city. It was inaugurated virtually on 29 September 2024 by PMO Narendra Modi. The Solapur airport has been developed at an estimated cost of Rs 65 crore to operate Code- B- type of aircraft. The Terminal Building of Solapur now has a total area of 1152 sqm. to serve 150 passengers during peak hours and 4.1 lakh passengers annually. The artworks installed inside the Terminal building glorify and showcase the rich art, architecture and culture of Solapur City. The paintings at different locations in the terminal showcasing the Lavani dance form, the images of various traditional musical instruments of Maharashtra and 'Pandharpur Wari' work displays to make the passengers informed and enchanted with the enriched cultural heritage, rooted tradition and religious beliefs of the city.

Scheduled flights operating out of Solapur Airport to cities like Mumbai to begin operating soon. With the new Airport, Solapur anticipates heightened connectivity, promising increased business opportunities and tourism growth in the region.

== Utility services ==
The electrical supply to the city is managed by the Maharashtra State Electricity Distribution Company Limited and water is supplied from the Ujjani Dam on the Bhima River. CNG will be soon available for vehicle in Solapur as well as piped natural Gas will be available for Domestic, Commercial and industrial use.

=== Radio stations in Solapur ===
In the Solapur, both the official state channel Air Solapur on a frequency of 103.4 FM and commercial stations such as Radio City (91.1 FM), Big FM (92.7 FM) and Solapur's Only Live Radio Station 95 MYFM by Dainik Bhaskar Group. are broadcast. List of radio stations.

== Notable people ==
=== History ===
- Siddheshwar (Siddarameshwara), Prominent Kannada vachanakara of 12th century. He was instrumental in saving the vachana literature from destruction.

=== Politics ===
- Vijaysinh Mohite–Patil, former Deputy Chief-Minister of Maharashtra State
- Praniti Shinde, Member of Parliament, Solapur Lok Sabha constituency, Solapur
- Sushilkumar Shinde, former Home Minister of India and Chief Minister of Maharashtra.
- Ganpatrao Deshmukh India's second longest serving legislator (MLA), Peasant's and worker's Party senior leader.
- Subhash Deshmukh, Member of Legislative Assembly, South Solapur

=== Business ===
- Ajit Gulabchand, Indian industrialist
- Walchand Hirachand, Indian industrialist and founder of Walchand group

=== Sports ===
- Salil Ankola, member of Indian cricket team in 1992 world Cup; Hindi film actor
- Anagha Deshpande, Indian women's cricket player
- Kedar Jadhav, Indian cricketer; plays for Sunrisers Hyderabad in IPL
- Kiran Navgire, Indian woman's cricket player
- Vandana Shanbagh, Arjuna award winner athlete; represented India at 1988 Olympics
- Prarthana Thombare, tennis player and an Olympian. Former No. 1 in national women's doubles.
- Polly Umrigar, cricketer who captained India in 8 test matches.

=== Arts ===
- Samita Bangargi, a TV show host and actress in Hindi movies
- Achyut Godbole, Maharashtrian Marathi and English writer
- M. F. Husain, a modern Indian painter of international acclaim and a founding member of Bombay Progressive Artists' Group
- Atul Kulkarni, Indian film actor
- Jayadevi Taayi Ligade, is an Indian writer in the Kannada language. She has written Siddarama purana in Kannada and Marathi languages.
- Nagraj Manjule, film director of Marathi movies
- Dr Jabbar Patel, theatre and film director of Marathi and Hindi movies
- Shashikala, an actress in Marathi and Hindi movies

=== Science ===
- Dwarkanath Kotnis, among the physicians dispatched to China to provide medical assistance during the Second Sino-Japanese War in 1938
