= Viresh Oberoi =

Indian businessman (born 1956)

- Born: 17 August 1956 (age 70); Delhi, India
- Education: Hans Raj College; Delhi University
- Occupation: Former CEO of mjunction

Viresh Oberoi (born 17 August 1956) is the former Managing Director and Chief Executive Officer of Mjunction Services, a joint venture between Indian steel giants Tata Steel and SAIL, founded in 2001.

== Early life and education ==
After graduating in History from Hansraj College in Delhi, Oberoi went on the complete business and management programs from elite academic institutions including, IIM Ahmedabad, India, INSEAD - CEDEP - Fontainebleau, France and Harvard Business School, Boston, USA.

== Career ==
Interviewed and selected by Russi Mody, Oberoi joined Tata Steel in 1978 as a Sales Trainee. The next twenty years saw him travelling across the country handling sales of many different product groups, manage distribution channels and build relationships in key accounts. In 1994 he was appointed the youngest Chief Sales Manager of Tata Steel.

In 1998 when the company, (then known as metaljunction) decided to revamp their core market facing processes, Oberoi was selected to head the cross functional team and implement SAP technologies in Tata Steel as Project Manager in cooperation with Arthur D. Little and IBM Global Services.

This implementation laid a strategic foundation for Tata Steel's position in the Steel Industry in India and abroad. In October 2000, he was selected to be the CEO of Tata Steel's joint venture with SAIL – metaljunction.com—that forever transformed the steel and coal supply chains in India.

Then Tata Steel MD, Dr Jamshed J. Irani appointed Oberoi from day one of the new company. However, after the company was formed, it was left to Oberoi and his team to make it work. Among several challenges, the foremost was to work on clients’ mindsets so that they make the switch from offline to online transactions.

Oberoi founded the Movement for Efficiency & Transparency (MET), a platform provided to select change agents of society to present their success stories before a select audience. The 11th edition of MET was held at Bokaro in May 2015.

== Personal life ==
Oberoi is married and he is an avid golfer and an experimental traveler. He has backpacked through Europe, Africa and large parts of Asia. In fact, his longest backpacking trip lasted three months across seven countries of Europe. Both golf and squash are his favorite pastimes. He is also passionate about wildlife and its conservation. He has won The Economic Times Leader's Challenge Tour in 2011 in golf.

== Awards and positions ==
The Indian Institute of Materials Management awarded him "The Chief Executive for the Year" in November 2012.

In 2005, Oberoi and mjunction received the Excellence Award for outstanding performance in the field of industrial development in India by the Institute of Economic Studies, New Delhi. Oberoi also received the Udyog Rattan Award as the best achiever in Indian business in the same year.

In 2006, Oberoi was again awarded by the Institute of Economic Studies, New Delhi with a gold medal and the Shartiya Shiromoni Puraskar for enhancing the image of the country abroad.

Oberoi is currently chairman of CII's National Committee on e-commerce. He also holds the position of National President of the Multiple Sclerosis Society of India (MSSI). In 2014–15, Oberoi was Chairman of the CII Eastern Region.
