= Punam Suri =

Indian educator

- Born: Poonam Suri
- Occupations: Editor Manager of The Daily Millap; President of D.A.V. College Managing Committee
- Years active: 2008-present
- Known for: D.A.V. College Managing Committee as a president
- Notable work: President of DAV CMC

Punam Suri is an Indian educator, journalist and recipient of the Padma Shri. Suri is president of the D.A.V. College Managing Committee and Chancellor of DAV University. He was formerly managing editor of The Daily Milap, an Indian newspaper.
