= D.A.V. College Managing Committee =

Non-governmental educational organisation in India

DAV College Managing Committee
- Abbreviation: DAVCMC
- Formation: 1 June 1886 (140 years ago)
- Founder: Mahatma Hansraj
- Type: Private
- Headquarters: New Delhi, India
- Location: Chitra Gupta Road, New Delhi28.643759°N 77.20803°E
- Region served: India, Fiji, Nepal, Mauritius, Singapore
- Official language: Hindi, English and other regional languages
- President: Dr. Punam Suri
- Key people: Lala Lajpat Rai, Rai Bahadur Lal Chand, Bhagat Ishwar Das, Mahatma Hansraj, Lala Dwarka Das, Rai Bahadur Durga Das
- Affiliations: CBSE, ICSE, other regional boards and Arya Samaj
- Employees: 100000+
- Website: www.davcmc.net.in

The D.A.V. College Managing Committee, commonly known as DAVCMC, is a non-governmental educational organisation in India and overseas with over 900 schools, 75 colleges and a university. It is based on the ideals of Dayananda Saraswati and Arya Samaj. The Dayanand Anglo-Vedic (DAV) education system also comprises colleges offering graduate and post-graduate degrees in various disciplines all over India.

Founded in 1890 in Lahore, British India (now Pakistan), these schools are run by the Dayanand Anglo-Vedic College Trust (DAVCT) and Management Society, also commonly known as the Dayanand Anglo-Vedic Education Society (DAVES). Today, institutional records of the D.A.V. College Trust and Management Society are part of the archives at the Nehru Memorial Museum and Library, at Teen Murti House, Delhi.

English is the primary language of instruction, with students also receiving compulsory education in Hindi and Sanskrit or a regional language. The DAV movement has grown to become the single largest non-governmental educational society in the country, managing 900+ educational institutions, apart from D.A.V. Public Schools across the country and even abroad,(~9 including Nepal, Singapore, UK, USA and colleges in Mauritius and Fiji) with an annual budget of more than INR ₹2 billion. It employs over 50,000 people and educates more than 2 million students every year.

In 2013, the Associated Chambers of Commerce and Industry of India awarded 40 institutions for its contribution to quality education. ASSOCHAM awarded DAV College Managing Committee with 'Best Chain of Schools in India' award.

== History ==
Mahatma Hansraj was the founder of the national D.A.V. College Managing Committee. In 1886 the first DAV School was established in Lahore which was subsequently upgraded to become the first DAV College. In 1886 the DAV College Trust and Management Society was established and registered.

== List of presidents ==
The first inaugural holder for the post of President was Rai Bahadur Lal Chand whose term was from 1886 until 1894, from 1896 until 1899 and from 1900 until 1902. Other office holders were Bhagat Ishwar Dass, Lala Dwarka Dass, Mahatma Hansraj, CJI Mehr Chand Mahajan, Padma Bhushan Suraj Bhan, Prof. Ved Vyasa, Darbari Lal, T. R. Tuli, G. P. Chopra and other. The current office holder is Padma Shri Dr. Punam Suri whose term is from 2011.

No	Name	Term
1	Rai Bahadur Lal Chand	1886 – 1894
2	Bhagat Ishwar Dass	1895 – 1896
(1)	Rai Bahadur Lal Chand	1896 – 1899
(2)	Bhagat Ishwar Dass	1900 – 1902
(1)	Rai Bahadur Lal Chand	1901 – 1902
(2)	Bhagat Ishwar Dass	1903 – 1906
3	Lala Dwarka Dass	1907 – 1909
4	Mahatma Hansraj	1912 – 1918
5	Rai Bahadur Durga Dass	1919 – 1923
6	Dr Bakshi Sir Tek Chand	1924 – 1930
(4)	Mahatma Hansraj	1931
7	Sain Dass	1932
8	Rai Bahadur Mukund Lal Puri	1933 – 1935
9	Chief Justice (Dr.) Mehr Chand Mahajan	1936 – 1939
10	Dewan Chand	1940 – 1943
11	Mehr Chand	1945 – 1949
12	Lala Balraj	1950 – 1953
13	Nand Lal	1954
(9)	Chief Justice (Dr.) Mehr Chand Mahajan	1955 – 1964
14	Dr. G. L. Dutta	1965 – 1971
15	Justice J. L. Kapur	1972 – 1974
16	Suraj Bhan	1975 – 1980
17	Ved Vyasa	1981 – 1991
18	Babu Darbari Lal	1995
19	T. R. Tuli	1997 – 2000
20	G. P. Chopra	2000 – 2011
21	Dr. Punam Suri	2011 – present

== University ==
- DAV University, Jalandhar
- DAV Women's University, Yamunanagar

== Colleges ==
There are more than 75 colleges across India for graduate and post-graduate programmes.

=== Professional colleges ===
Under DAV

- University of Delhi
  - PGDAV College, Delhi
  - Hansraj College, Delhi
- University of Mumbai
  - Ramanand Arya DAV College, Mumbai
- College of Education
  - Sohan Lal DAV College of Education, Ambala, Haryana
  - Dr.Ganesh Dass DAV college of Education for Women, Karnal, Haryana
  - BN Saha DAV Teacher's Training College, Giridih, Jharkhand
  - DPB Dayanand College of Education, Solapur, Maharashtra
  - DAV College of Education, Abohar, Punjab
  - DAV College of Education for Women, outside Beri Gate, Amritsar, Punjab
  - Jialal B.Ed College, Ramganj, Beawer Road, Ajmer, Rajasthan
  - MCM DAV college, Kangra, Himachal Pradesh
- Law
  - Damani Gopabai Bhairuratan (D.G.B.) Dayanand Law College, Solapur, Maharashtra
- Medical, Ayurveda, Dental, Pharmacy and Physiotherapy
  - DAV Edwardganj Hospital, Malout, Punjab
  - Dayanand Ayurvedic College, Jalandhar, GT Road, Jalandhar, Punjab
  - Mahatma Hans Raj DAV Institute of Nursing, Mahatma Hans Raj Marg, Jalandhar, Punjab
  - JN Kapoor DAV Centenary Dental College, Model Town, Yamuna Nagar, Haryana
  - MN DAV Dental College, Tatul, Solan, Himachal Pradesh
  - TDTR DAV Institute of Physiotherapy & Rehabilitation Professor Colony, Yamuna Nagar, Haryana
  - DAV Institute of Physiotherapy & Rehabilitation, GT Road, Jalandhar, Punjab
  - Km. Vimla Memorial DAV Physio Centre & Gym, Chheharta, Amritsar, Punjab
  - DAV Pharmacy College, Mahatma Hans GT Road, Jalandhar City, Punjab
- Management
  - DAV Institute of Management, NH-III, NIT, Faridabad, Haryana
  - DAV Centre for Management Development in Agriculture & Environment, N-4/16, Civil Township, Rourkela, Odisha
  - DAV School of Business Management, Unit-8, Bhubaneswar, Odisha
  - DAV Institute of Management Studies & Research, Pune, Maharashtra
- Engineering and Technology
  - NMDC DAV Polytechnic, Old Central School Building, Dantewada, Chhattisgarh
  - DAV College of Engg. & Technology, Kanina, Mohindergarh, Haryana
  - DAV Institute of Engineering & Technology Betla Road, Medininagar, Daltonganj, Palamau, Jharkhand
  - DAV Institute of Engineering & Technology, Kabir Nagar, Mahatma Hans Raj Marg, Jalandhar, Punjab
  - Mehr Chand Polytechnic College, Dayanand Nagar, GT Road, Jalandhar, Punjab
  - Mehr Chand Technical Institute, Dayanand Nagar, GT Road, Jalandhar, Punjab
  - Dayanand Junior Technical School, Dayanad Nagar, GT Road, Jalandhar, Punjab
- Industrial Training
  - NMDC Ltd. DAV Industrial Training Center, Bhansi, Dantewada, Chhattisgarh
  - NMDC - DAV ITC Nagarnagar, Jagdalpur, Bastar, Chhattisgarh
  - Dayanand Industrial Training Institute Katra Sher Singh, Amritsar, Punjab

== Schools ==
There are more than 800 schools across India. Mostly CBSC affiliated schools and study in DAV board under 8th standard with DAV publication books.

=== Number of schools by states ===
- AP: 3
- Bihar: 73.
- CG: 92.
- CHD: 3.
- DLI: 27.
- GJ: 3.
- HP: 41.
- HR: 84.
- JH: 73.
- J&K: 2.
- KT: 4.
- MH: 11.
- MN: 1.
- MP: 17.
- Odisha: 43.
- PB: 54.
- RJ: 13.
- Sikkim: 1.
- TG: 9.
- TN: 1.
- UK: 8.
- UP: 31.
- WB: 19.

=== D.A.V’s Saga of SUCCESS - The Hall of Fame ===
  - Prime Ministers - Sh. A.B. Vajpayee, Sh.I.K.Gujral, Sh. Manmohan Singh.
  - Vice Presidents - Sh. Krishna kant, Sh. Bhairon Singh Shekhawat.
  - Defence - General (retd.) V.P.Malik, Air Chief Marshal (Retd.)O.P.Mehra.
  - Space - Kalpana Chawla.
  - Science - Dr. Hargobind Khurana.
  - Performing Arts - Sh. Sunil Dutt, Shahrukh Khan, Jaspal Bhatti, Jagjit Singh, Sukhwinder Singh.
  - Sports - Sh. M.S.Dhoni, Kapil Dev, Yuvraj Singh, Mohinder Amarnath, Chetan Chauhan, Milkha Singh.

== Aided schools ==
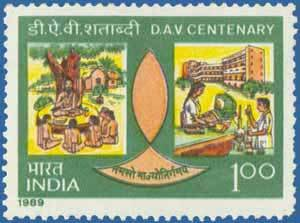
DAV Centenary Postage stamp

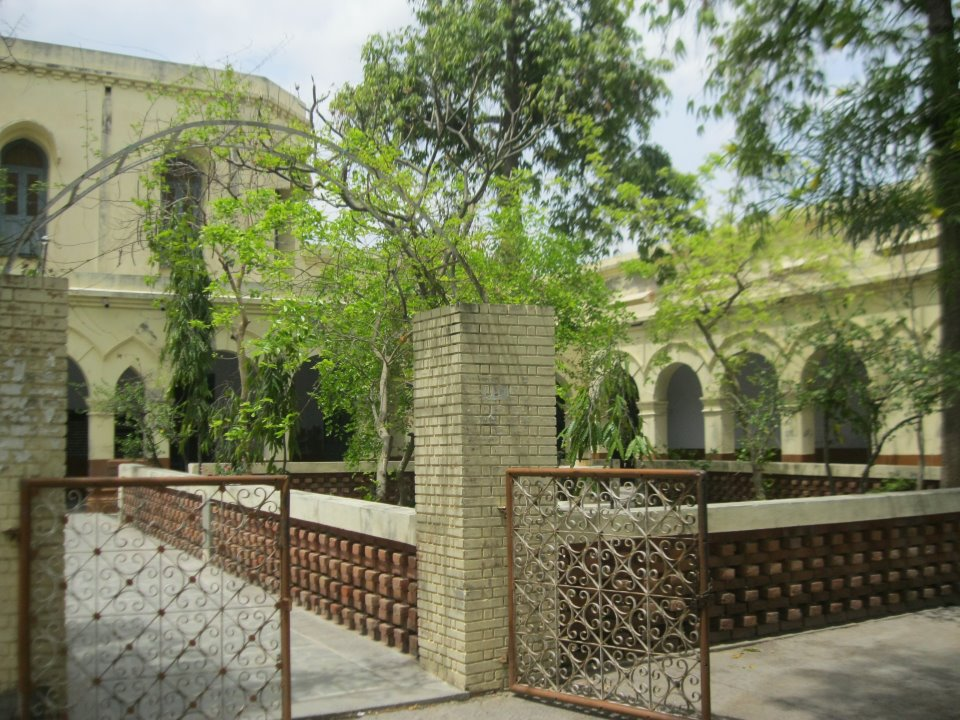
CAV High School at Hisar.

There are over 62 government-aided DAV schools across the country which are run by DAVCMC in co-operation with six states (Haryana, Himachal Pradesh, Maharashtra, New Delhi, Orissa, and Punjab) and the Chandigarh union territory governments.

== Unaided schools ==
There are more than 900 not-for-profit charitable trust-run unaided DAV schools across India and several other countries for studies up to the higher secondary level. In India, they are more in the states of Bihar, Jharkhand, Chhattisgarh, and Odisha.

== DAV institutes outside India ==
=== Colleges ===
- Fiji
  - DAV College, Ba, Ba
  - DAV College, Suva, Nabua, Suva
- Mauritius
  - D.A.V. College, Saint André
  - Dr. Jugroo Seegobin D.A.V. College, Port Louis

=== Schools ===
- Singapore
  - D.A.V. Hindi School at Singapore Arya Samaj temple, Syed Alwi Road, Little India
- Nepal
  - DAV Sushil Kedia Vishwa Bharati Higher Secondary, Kathmandu, Nepal
  - D.A.V. Dedraj Sewal Devi Todi Higher Secondary School, Biratnagar
- United Kingdom
  - Dayanand Anglo-Vedic Primary School, Birmingham
- United States of America
  - DAV Montessori School, Houston

== Related educational institutes ==
These Arya Samaj educational institutes are not under the DAV College Managing Committee.

- Gurukul Kangri Vishwavidyalaya
- GNA University
- Dayanand Industrial Training Institute Katra Sher Singh, Amritsar, Punjab
- Dayanand Model High School, Shakti Nagar, Amritsar, Punjab

== See also ==
- Akhara
- Ekal Vidyalaya
- Gurukula
