= Vineet Bajpai =

Indian entrepreneur and author

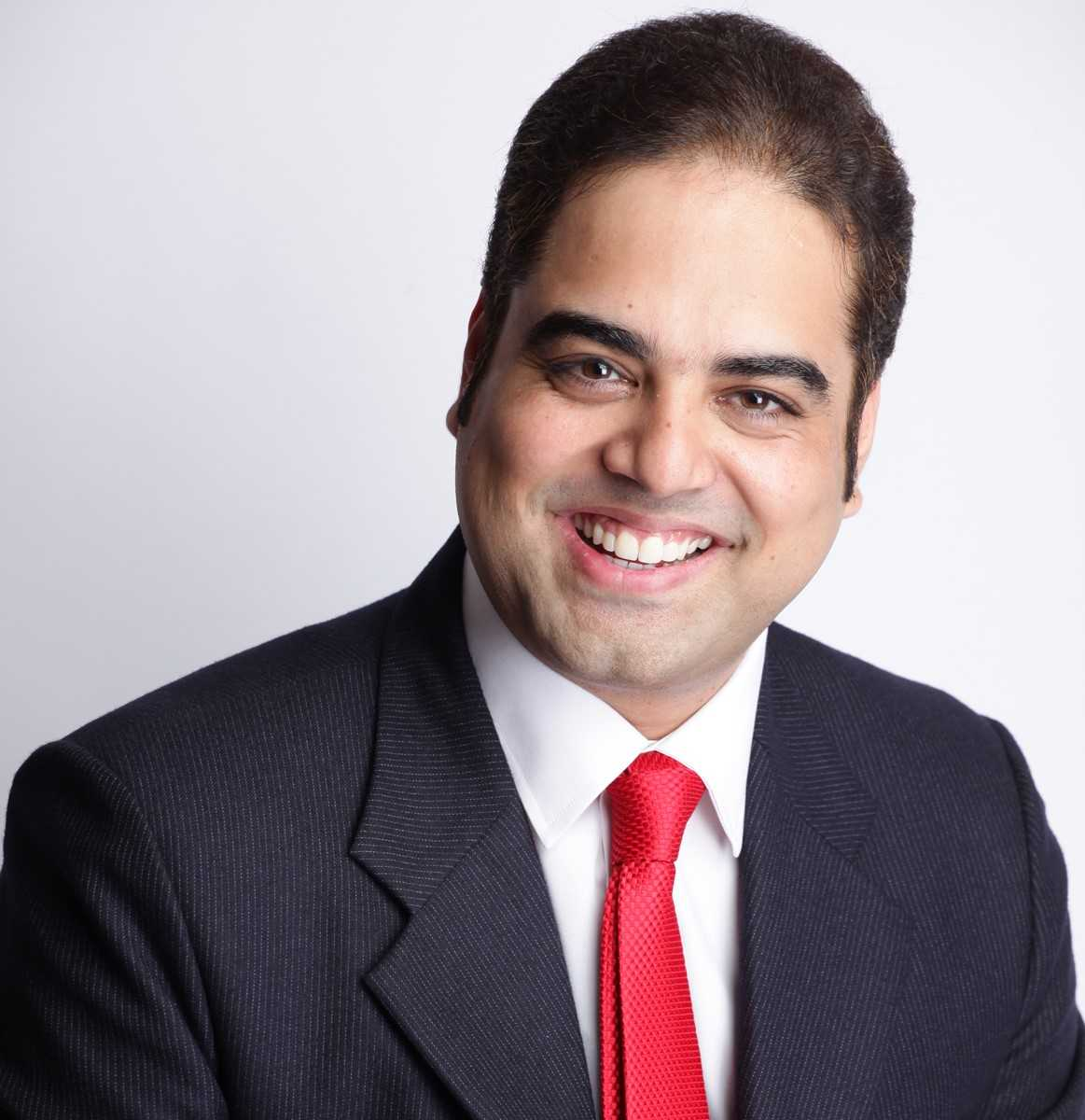
- Born: Bareilly, Uttar Pradesh, India
- Occupations: Founder and CEO of Magnon Group and Talentrack
- Website: www.vineetbajpai.com

Vineet Bajpai is an Indian entrepreneur, author, and founder of Talentrack, an online hiring platform. He is the author of nine books: Build From Scratch, The Street to the Highway, The 30 Something CEO, Harappa: Curse of the Blood River, Pralay: The Great Deluge, Kashi: Secret of the Black Temple, Mastaan: The Fallen Patriot of Delhi, 1857: The Sword of Mastaan, and Delhi: City of the Blood Gates.

== Education ==
He holds an Honours degree in Economics (1997) from Hansraj College, Delhi University and Post Graduate Diploma in Business Management (1999) from Lal Bahadur Shastri Institute of Management, New Delhi.

== Career ==
Bajpai began his career with General Electric before starting his first company Magnon Solutions, which was majority-acquired by the Omnicom Group. In March 2014, Bajpai became CEO of the TBWA Group in India until January 2016. In January 2016, he launched Talentrack — a talent-engagement platform for M&E sector. In December 2025, Bajpai was appointed CEO of Omnicom Production (India) and added to the global production leadership team.

=== Writing ===
Vineet Bajpai is a best-selling Indian author. His second book, The Street to the Highway, was published by Jaico in 2011. The 30 Something CEO, was published by Jaico in 2016. His first novel, Harappa: Curse of the Blood River, was published in June 2017. Pralay: The Great Deluge was published in January 2018, followed by Kashi: Secret of the Black Temple and Mastaan: The Fallen Patriot of Delhi. 1857: The Sword of Mastaan, was published in February 2021. Delhi: City of the Blood Gates was published in June 2023.

== Awards and recognition ==
Bajpai won the Asia Pacific Entrepreneurship Award in 2011. In 2012, he won the CNBC TV Mercedes Benz Young Turks Award. He won the Entrepreneur of the Year Award in 2016, bestowed by Entrepreneur magazine.

On 15 February 2019, Reliance Entertainment announced that it had acquired film, web-series, gaming, and merchandise rights to Bajpai's Harappa Trilogy.
