= V. K. Dadhwal =

Indian scientist and academic

- Born: 9 April 1957 (age 69); Delhi
- Education: Hansraj College; Delhi University; Indian Agricultural Research Institute
- Scientific career
- Workplaces: Space Applications Centre; Indian Institute of Remote Sensing; National Remote Sensing Centre; Indian Institute of Space Science and Technology; National Institute of Advanced Studies

Vinay Kumar Dadhwal (born 9 April 1957) is an Indian scientist and academic who primarily works in the field of remote sensing. He is known for his contribution to the development of remote sensing applications in agriculture, including crop forecasting and irrigation management. He served as the Director of Indian Institute of Space Science and Technology, Thiruvananthapuram. Dadhwal also served as the Director, National Remote Sensing Centre (NRSC), Hyderabad and the Dean, Indian Institute of Remote Sensing, a unit under Department of Space.

== Education and career ==
V. K. Dadhwal received a B.Sc. degree in botany from Hansraj College, New Delhi and master's degree from Indian Agricultural Research Institute, New Delhi in year 1978. He received his Ph.D. in plant physiology from Indian Agricultural Research Institute in 1983.

After the completion of his Ph.D., Dadhwal joined the Space Applications Centre (ISRO), Ahmedabad in year 1983 where he served as the Head, Crop Inventory and Modeling Division during 1998-2004. From 2004 to 2010 he served as the Dean at Indian Institute of Remote Sensing, Dehradun. In 2010, Dadwal joined National Remote Sensing Centre (NRSC), Hyderabad as the Associate Director and went on to become the Director, a position he held till 2016. He served as the Director of Indian Institute of Space Science and Technology, Thiruvananthapuram between the period 2016-2021.

== Awards and honors ==
Dadhwal is a science panel member of Terrestrial Carbon Observation (TCO) of Food and Agriculture Organization, Rome. He is a recipient of several awards, including Indian National Remote Sensing Award (1999), Dr. Vikram Sarabhai Award (1999), ISRO-Astronautical Society of India Award (2005), and ISRO Merit Award (2006).
