= Jagrit Anand =

Indian cricketer

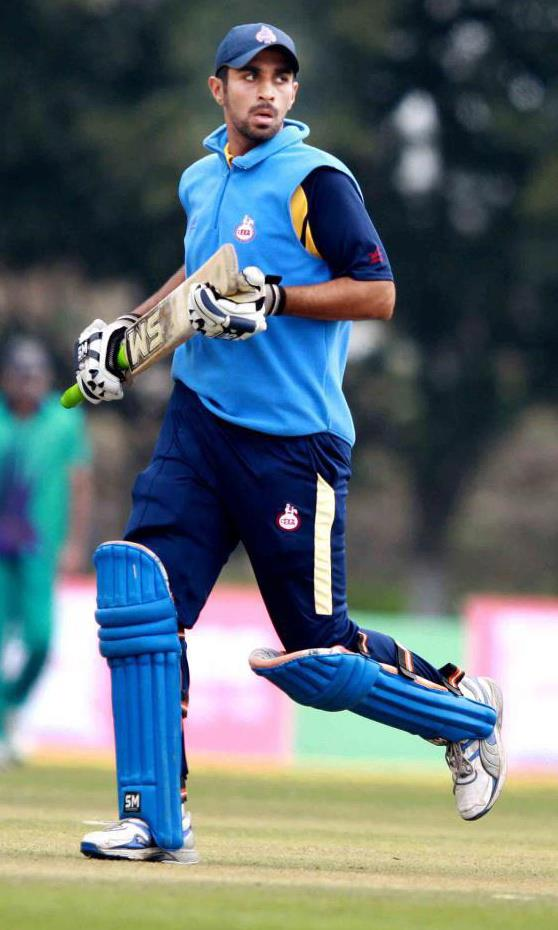
- Jagrit Anand

Personal information
- Born: 15 July 1989 (age 37); Delhi, India
- Source: ESPNcricinfo, 7 April 2016

Jagrit Anand (born 15 July 1989) is an Indian cricketer. He plays List A and Twenty20 cricket for Delhi.

Due to his consistent performances in the games he was then selected in the Delhi & District Cricket Association (DDCA) U-17 team in 2004–2005 to play the Vijay Merchant trophy conducted by BCCI, he played for two consecutive years in 2004-2005 and 2005–2006 season where DDCA won the All India Championship in 2005-2006 (Virat Kohli and Ishant Sharma were part of the same team in both the seasons).

== Early career ==
He played the All India IPSC School Tournaments for Modern School Barakhamba Road which has produced several national and international cricketers. Post his school he did his graduation from Hansraj College, Delhi University where he was selected for his excellence in Cricket.

He represented Kolkata Knightriders in their tour to Australia in September–October 2008 where he was handpicked by John Buchanan (Chief Coach) in his talent hunt program across India. In 2010 he was selected for the DDCA Under-22 team for the prestigious CK Naidu Trophy conducted by BCCI where his performances helped him get selected for Delhi Ranji Trophy team in 2011. He went on to represent the Delhi First-Class team from 2011 to 2015. He made a remarkable debut by scoring 58 runs and taking 2 wickets against Services team. In 2012-2013 he was the member of the DDCA team which won the prestigious Vijay Hazare trophy. He played a crucial role in the finals by scoring 48 runs and adding a crucial 115 runs with Unmukt Chand.

== Domestic career ==
He also represented the DDCA U-25 team in CK Naidu Trophy in 2012-13 and 2013–14. He made his career best of 150 against Jammu and Kashmir. In 2014 he was one of the top 5 fast bowlers in Indian domestic circuit.

During this period, he played several prestigious All India Tournaments such as Moin Ud Daula and J.P. Atrey representing DDCA President's XI. He was also selected to play in the Challenger Trophy in 2013, which is the most prestigious one day domestic tournament conducted by BCCI, under the captaincy of Virat Kohli. The team went on to be the Runners up.

In 2013, Jagrit represented Jamia University in the All India University Championship.

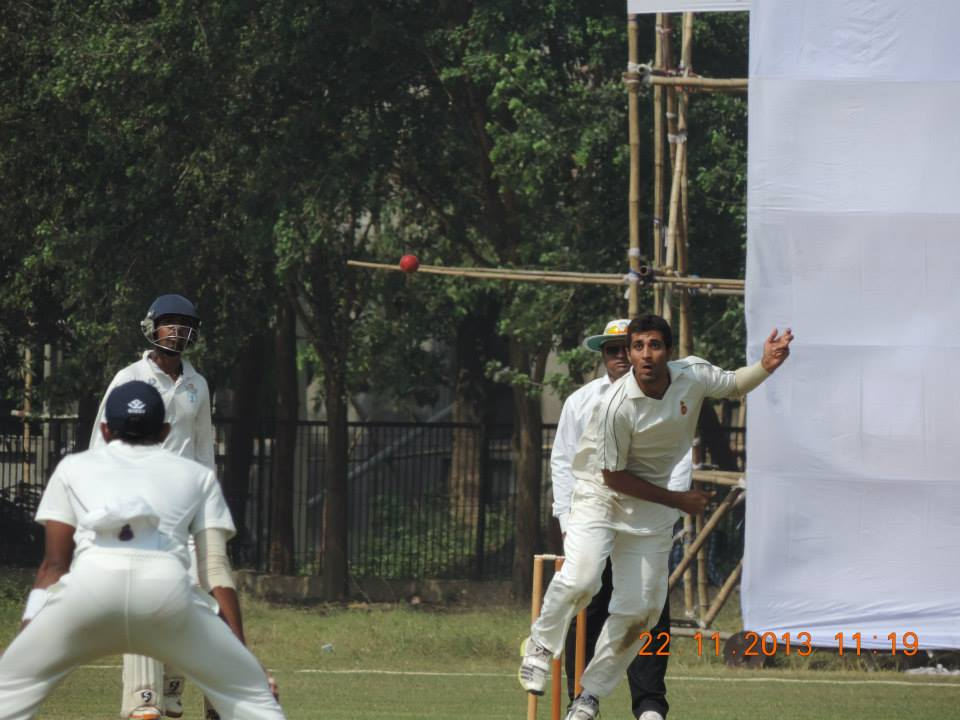

He played as a professional from Team Interface Transworld in the A division league in UAE from 2010 to 2014. In his very first tournament he won the Player of the Tournament award in Sharjah Cricket Council. He also represented the Air India team from 2011 to 2014 which is the top cricket club of India. He played for the Delhi Mughals in the Superstar T 20 league held in Dubai where top international cricketers played for different teams.

Jagrit played his first international game against England in New Delhi in 2013 for DDCA team. He then went on to play the Journey to the World Cup tournament in Nepal where he played against the Nepal and Singapore International team. He was adjudged Player of the Tournament in the series and his team, Air India, went on to win the championship.

== Professional player overseas ==
In 2017, Jagrit has been playing for the cricket clubs in USA. He has represented Somerset Cavaliers in the CLNJ and Millennium Cricket tournaments, Titans CC in Washington Cricket League, Holmdel Cricket club in the T-20 format of CLNJ and Millennium cricket league where he was the top batsman in the Millennium cricket league and Irving cricket club in the Dallas Cricket League. His teams Somerset Cavaliers, Holmdel Cricket club and Irving Cricket club went on to win the championships.
