= Ranchi Institute of Neuropsychiatry and Allied Sciences =

Medical college in Ranchi, India

Ranchi Institute of Neuropsychiatry and Allied Sciences (RINPAS) is an unaided government run medical college in Ranchi, Jharkhand. It is one of the oldest tertiary care centers in Eastern India.
