= Richard Rekhy =

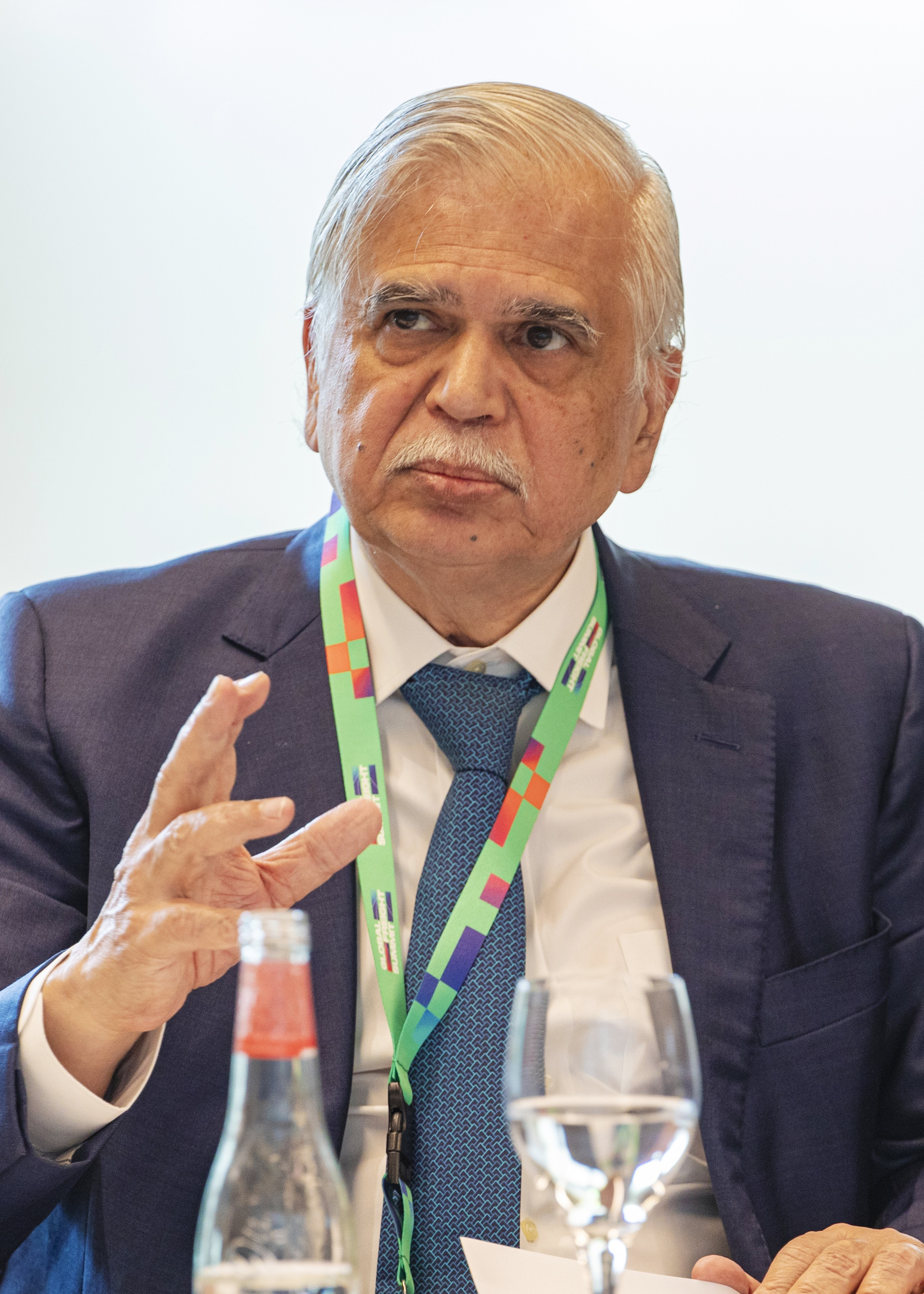
- Rekhy in 2024
- Born: India
- Education: Delhi University
- Occupation: Chief Executive Officer of KPMG in India

Richard Rekhy served as the chief executive officer of KPMG in India from October 2012 till early February 2017 after he announced his retirement in 2016.

Richard has over 28 years of multilayered and sectoral high level experience. He has served clients across advertising, oil and gas, industrial and consumer markets, and specifically in the pharmaceuticals, technology, manufacturing and retail domains. He has a detailed understanding of corporate governance, enterprise risk management, internal audit and business processes re-engineering.

Richard is on the National Council of CII and chairs their Northern Region Economic Affairs and Taxation Committee. He is a member of the National Executive Committee of CII for Corporate Governance and on the Board of the prestigious American Chambers of Commerce (AMCHAM).

Richard was recently appointed as the Chairman of Enactus India, which is an international non-profit organisation. He is also a member of the EMA and Global Board for KPMG International.

On 6 November 2016 Richard announced that he would be retiring from the firm.

Rekhy speaks at public forums and has written articles on corporate governance, risk management, leadership, and the economy. In January 2016, he gave a TEDx Talk titled 'Higher Purpose in Life'.

== Education ==
Richard qualified as a Chartered Accountant in the year 1983 and a B.Com (Hons), Accounting, taxation, Economics from Delhi University.

== Association with KPMG India ==
Position	Period
Chief Executive Officer	2012–2017
Deputy Chief Executive Officer and Head of Advisory	2009–2012
Chief Operating Officer	2006–2009
Head of the Risk Advisory Services Practice	2004–2006

== Past Major Experiences ==
Organisation	Position	Period
Ernst & Young, India	Partner	2002–2004
Arthur Andersen, India	Partner	1997–2002
RSM & Co.	Partner	1984–1997

== Retirement from KPMG ==
In October 2012, Rekhy took over as India CEO of KPMG. From the year 2014 to 2016, as many as 60 partners steadily quit the KPMG India to join PwC, Deloitte and Ernst and Young. Increasing politicisation, some conflict of interest issues and arbitrary organisational changes," were among the reasons for the brewing disaffection.
This sparked complaints by partners over Rekhy’s management style, as a result Richard Rekhy’s leadership role at KPMG India was curtailed by the KPMG Global leadership by handing over effective charge to deputy CEO Akhil Bansal.
On 6 November 2016, a Week after the global leadership made changes to the KPMG India leadership team, Richard Rekhy, the incumbent CEO of the firm, advised KPMG India Board of his decision to retire as CEO of the India firm. In a statement, by accepting his retirement, the firm said: "The India Board, after due deliberations and after recognising Richard’s stellar professional and personal contributions to the India firm over the last many years as the CEO and in his prior leadership roles, respectfully accepted Richard’s decision to retire."
