= Mansi Aggarwal =

Indian choreographer

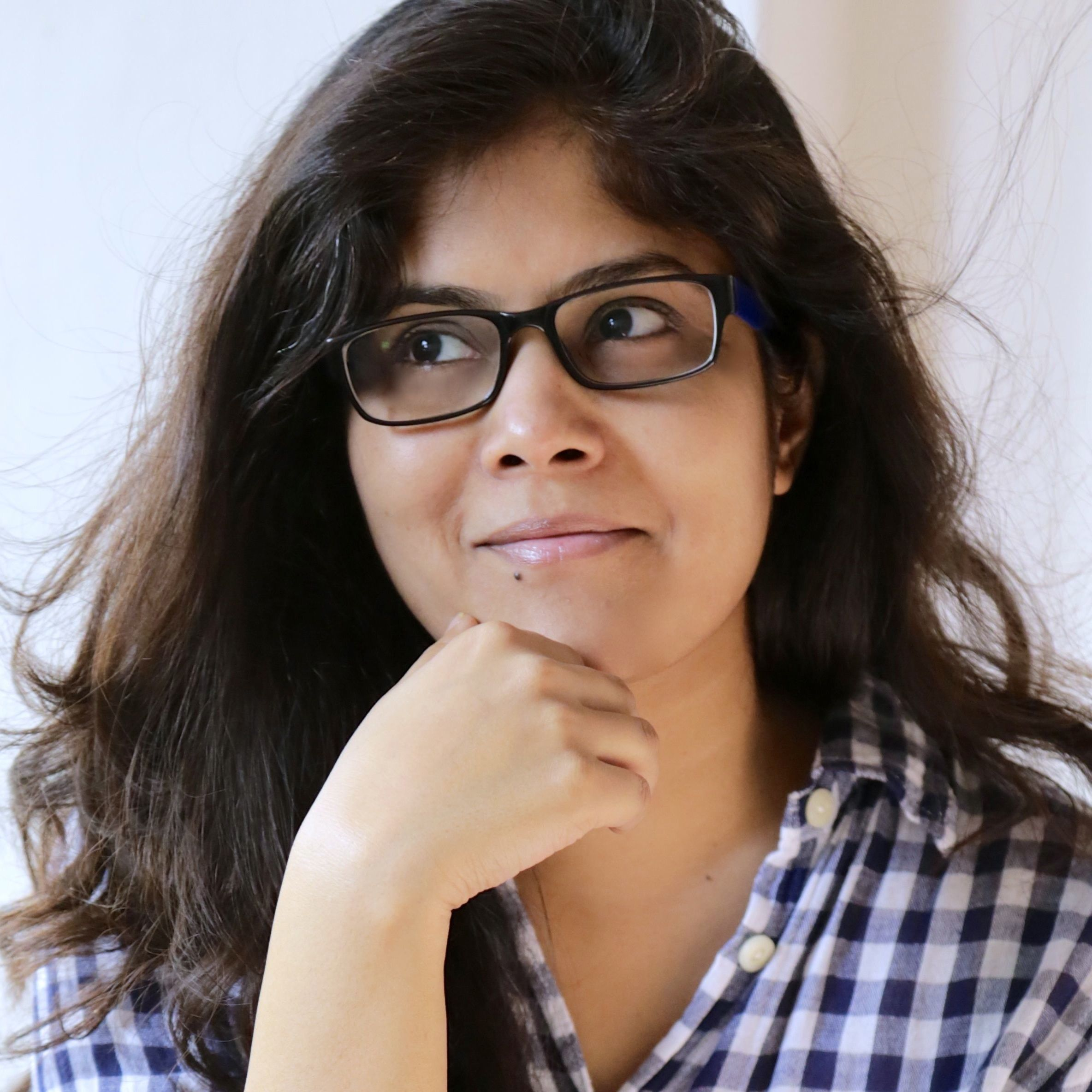
- Born: 10 June 1984 (age 42); Delhi, India
- Occupations: Filmmaker, writer, producer and choreographer
- Years active: 2008 – present
- Spouse: Arindam Bhattacharjee
- Website: https://www.mansiaggarwal.com/

Mansi Aggarwal (born 10 June 1984) is an Indian filmmaker, writer, producer and choreographer who has written, directed, produced films and choreographed songs in Indian film industry. She is best known for choreographing the song, "Bharat Mata ki Jai", from the movie Shanghai that starred actor Emraan Hashmi - the song gained a lot of popularity and became a hit in India. She has worked with path breaking actors - Priyanka Chopra in Mary Kom, Rajkumar Rao in Kai Po Che, and with Abhay Deol in the movie Dev D.

She has been nominated for the Filmfare award for the song "Bharat Mata ki Jai" from Shanghai starring the actor Emraan Hashmi, the song was loved by the audience and became popular in India. The song "Suno na Sangmarmar" from the movie Youngistaan was also nominated for Stardust and Filmfare awards.

She also choreographed commercials for big brands like Nykaa, Biba, Zandu Balm, etc. She was published as the youngest choreographer in the eminent magazine Femina. In 2018, she made her debut as a writer-director with her first short film The Handbag, which was posted on ‘Humara Movie’ YouTube channel. She came with her second film Raani, which got selected for Lift Off Global Networks, London and was also screened at the Darbhanga International Film Festival. It was a finalist at the Golden Jury International Film Festival and won the Best Actor award at the same. Raani released on Disney Hotstar and is streaming on MX Player. The films The Handbag and Raani were produced under the banner Yin Yang Films.

== Early life and career ==
Mansi was born on 10 June 1984 and raised in Delhi where she also took training in Indian classical dance, Kathak. Her Kathak training started when she was only 7 years old and she later became a Visharad (graduate) in the dance form. She studied Economics at Hansraj College in Delhi University and after finishing her graduation she opened her dance institute in Delhi—Mansi Dance Creations

Her career in Bollywood movies started when she was first spotted by the film director, Anurag Kashyap, during a dance performance in Delhi. Anurag offered her to choreograph the critically acclaimed film, Gulaal. However, the movie got delayed and Mansi shifted her focus to academics until Anurag came to her for the second time with the proposal of choreographing Abhay Deol-starrer, Dev D.

Mansi is married to cinematographer Arindam Bhattacharjee.

== Filmography ==
Mansi has choreographed the following Bollywood movies:

Year	Movie
2016	Vazandar
2015	Kaun Kitne Paani Mein
2015	Nanak Shah Fakir
2014	Mary Kom
2013	Youngistaan
2013	Mickey Virus
2013	Maazii
2013	Gippi
2013	Kai Po Che
2012	Shanghai
2009	Gulal
2009	Dev D
