= Shrikisan Laxminarayan Sarada =

- Born: 1893; Solapur, India
- Died: 12 January 1931 (aged 37–38)
- Cause of death: Execution By hanging
- Known for: Indian Independence Movement

Shrikisan Laxminarayan Sarada (1893 – 12 January 1931) was an Indian freedom fighter, a revolutionary. British Government had imposed a "Shoot at sight" order under martial law in Solapur in 1930 to suppress the freedom movement. Shrikisan Sarada along with Mallappa Dhanshetty, Abdul Rasool Qurban Hussain, and Jagannath Bhagwan Shinde defied the martial law. The Government in order to quell the freedom movement sentenced all four to death.
