= Mahatma Hansraj =

Indian educationist (1864 - 1938)

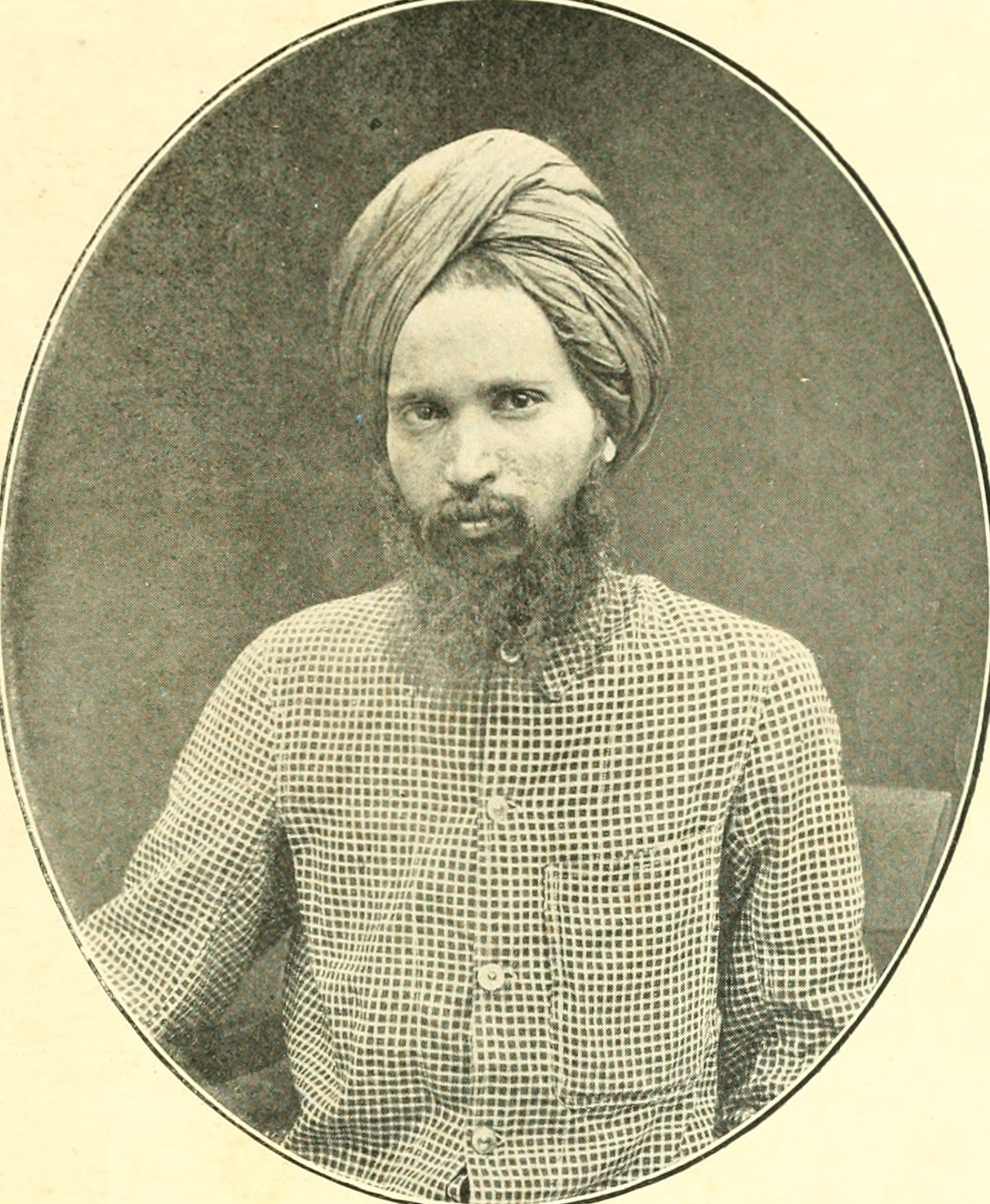
Hansraj

Hansraj (19 April 1864 – 14 November 1938) was an Indian educationist and a follower of Arya Samaj movement founder, Swami Dayanand. He founded, with Gurudatta Vidhyarthi, the Dayanand Anglo-Vedic Schools System (D.A.V.) in Lahore on 1 June 1886, where the first D.A.V. school was set up in memory of Dayanand who had died three years earlier.

He was also a compatriot of freedom fighter Lala Lajpat Rai. Hansraj served as the principal of D.A.V. College for 25 years, and committed the rest of his life in social service. A number of Dayanand Anglo-Vedic educational institutions were established. Today D.A.V. runs over 900 colleges, schools, professional and technical institutions.

== Early life and education ==
Hansraj was born in Bajwara, Hoshiarpur district, Punjab, British India into a Punjabi Hindu Khatri family on 19 April 1864. His father died before Hansraj was 19 and thereafter he was looked after and educated by his elder brother named as Mulkhraja. Subsequently his family moved to Lahore where he joined a missionary school. Meanwhile, he heard the lecture of Swami Dayanand and this changed his life course forever. He went on to complete his Bachelor of Arts (B.A.) degree with excellent marks.

== Job ==
Upon completing his B.A., instead of taking up a job, Hansraj decided to start up a school, the first D.A.V. (Dayanand Anglo-Vedic) school, along with a fellow Arya Samaji, Gurudatta Vidyarthi. Later he became the Principal of the Dayanand Anglo-Vedic College, Lahore, and president of the provincial Arya Pradeshik Pratinidhi Sabha, the D.A.V. section of Arya Samaj in Punjab. In 1893, the Arya Samaj split into two in Punjab, one section led by Lala Hans Raj and Lala Lajpat Rai retained the control over D.A.V. College, Lahore. The radical section was under the leadership of Pandit Lekh Ram and Lala Munshi Ram Vij (Swami Shraddhanand), who formed Punjab Arya Samaj and led Arya Pratinidhi Sabha. He served as the principal of D.A.V. College, Lahore for the next 25 years, and after his retirement committed the rest of his life in social service. He is credited of proposing Ashok Dharma Chakra in the middle of the Indian National Flag.

He died on 14 November 1938 in Lahore.

== Legacy ==
Today, many educational institutions are named after him, including Hans Raj Mahila Maha Vidyalaya, Jalandhar, Punjab Hans Raj College, Delhi University, where Mahatma Hans Raj College Road, is situated at the heart of the University's North campus.

== See also ==
- Arya Samajis
- Hindu reformists
