= Laxmidas Borkar =

Indian journalist (1925–1999)

Laxmidas Krishna Borkar
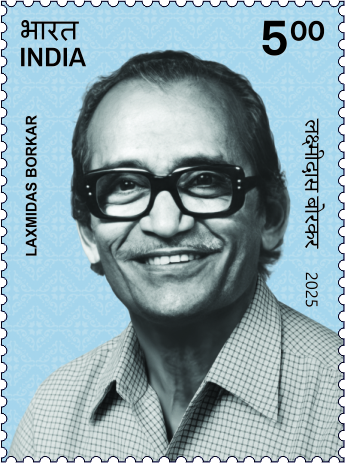
- Borkar in a 2025 stamp
- Born: 17 August 1925; Margão, Portuguese Goa
- Died: 4 December 1999 (aged 74); Mumbai, Maharashtra, India
- Occupations: Journalist, editor
- Known for: Editor of Navaprabha
- Political party: Praja Socialist Party
- Movement: Goan independence movement

Laxmidas Krishna Borkar (17 August 1925 – 4 December 1999) was an Indian independence activist, journalist, and editor. He was an active participant in the Goan independence movement. Borkar was the editor of the Marathi daily Navaprabha for 25 years.

In 2025, the Department of Posts released a postage stamp and First Day Cover to commemorate Borkar's contributions. The Laxmidas Borkar Memorial Award for Journalism is awarded to Goan journalists every year in his honour.

== Early life ==
Laxmidas Krishna Borkar was born on 17 August 1925 in Margao to Krishna Dattaram Borkar. He attended the lyceum for seven years.

== Goan independence movement ==
Borkar is credited as the person who was responsibile for escorting Ram Manohar Lohia from his hotel on 18 June 1946, as part of the events that are today celebrated as Goa Revolution Day. Borkar was also jailed five times by the Portuguese police.

Borkar's involvement in the movement continued with several key acts of protest. On 7 November 1946, he and Roque Sequeira offered satyagraha at Shiroda to protest the curbs on civil liberties. A speech he gave at the event led to a large procession towards Borim, which was met by Portuguese police gunfire, cited as the first instance of police firing on protestors in Goa. Borkar was arrested following the event.

In 1954, Borkar travelled to the International Court of Justice in The Hague to sign a representation advocating for Goa's liberation. The following year, on 18 May 1955, he joined Nath Pai in a satyagraha at Castle Rock. This act of civil disobedience was intended to disrupt railway traffic to Goa and pressure the Portuguese regime. Through these actions, Borkar became a key figure in the National Congress of Goa and the Praja Socialist Party.

== Journalism and literary career ==
Borkar began his journalism career at the daily newspaper Gomantak. In 1963, following Goa's liberation, he joined the Express Group of Newspapers as a staff correspondent in Panaji. In this role, he reported on the socio-political changes in post-liberation Goa for publications including Loksatta, The Indian Express, The Financial Express, and Screen.

In 1965, he moved to Mumbai to serve as the Chief Sub-Editor for Loksatta. On 16 September 1977, he was appointed as the editor of the Goan daily Navaprabha.

He served as the editor of Navaprabha for 25 years. His editorials were known for being "fearless and impartial" and focused on promoting Goan identity, self-respect, culture, and social reform.

In addition to his editorial work, Borkar was a founder-member of both the Goa Union of Journalists and the Goa Marathi Patrakar Sangh, organisations established to support press freedom. He was also associated with the Mumbai Marathi Patrakar Sangh.

== Death ==
Borkar died on 4 December 1999 in Mumbai.

== Legacy ==
In 2025, the Department of Posts, Government of India released a postage stamp and a first day cover to commemorate Borkar's contributions.

A road in Journalist Colony, Alto Betim, was named after him on 15 August 2024.

The Laxmidas Borkar Memorial Award for Journalism is awarded to Goan journalists every year in Borkar's honour.
