= Mallappa Dhanshetty =

Indian activist

Mallappa Dhanshetti
- Born: 1898; Solapur, Maharashtra, India
- Died: 12 January 1931 (aged 32–33); Yerwada Jail, Pune, India
- Cause of death: Execution by hanging
- Known for: Indian Independence Movement

Mallappa Dhanshetti (1898 – 12 January 1931) was an Indian freedom fighter and revolutionary. The British Government had imposed a "Shoot on sight" order under martial law in Solapur in 1930 to suppress the freedom movement. Mallappa, along with Shrikisan Laxminarayan Sarada, Abdul Rasool Qurban Hussain, and Jagannath Bhagwan Shinde, defied the martial law. In order to quell the freedom movement, the Government sentenced all four to death.

His father name Revansidhappa Dhanshetti. He worked in a private firm; took active part in the Civil Disobedience movement (1930); was a prominent and influential political worker of Sholapur. He led a large procession to protest against the arrest of Mahatma Gandhi on 8 May 1930. The police attempt at stopping it led to their resorting to firing in which several people were killed. The processionists hit back and in the ensuing clash one police constable was killed and another burnt alive. Martial Law was clamped in Sholapur and Dhanshetti was arrested along with others. He was tried for rioting and murder and was sentenced to death. He was hanged at the Yerwada Jail, Poona, on 12 January 1931.
