= Outline of Tonga =

Overview of and topical guide to Tonga

The flag of Tonga

The coat of arms of Tonga

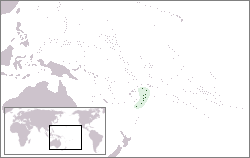
The location of Tonga

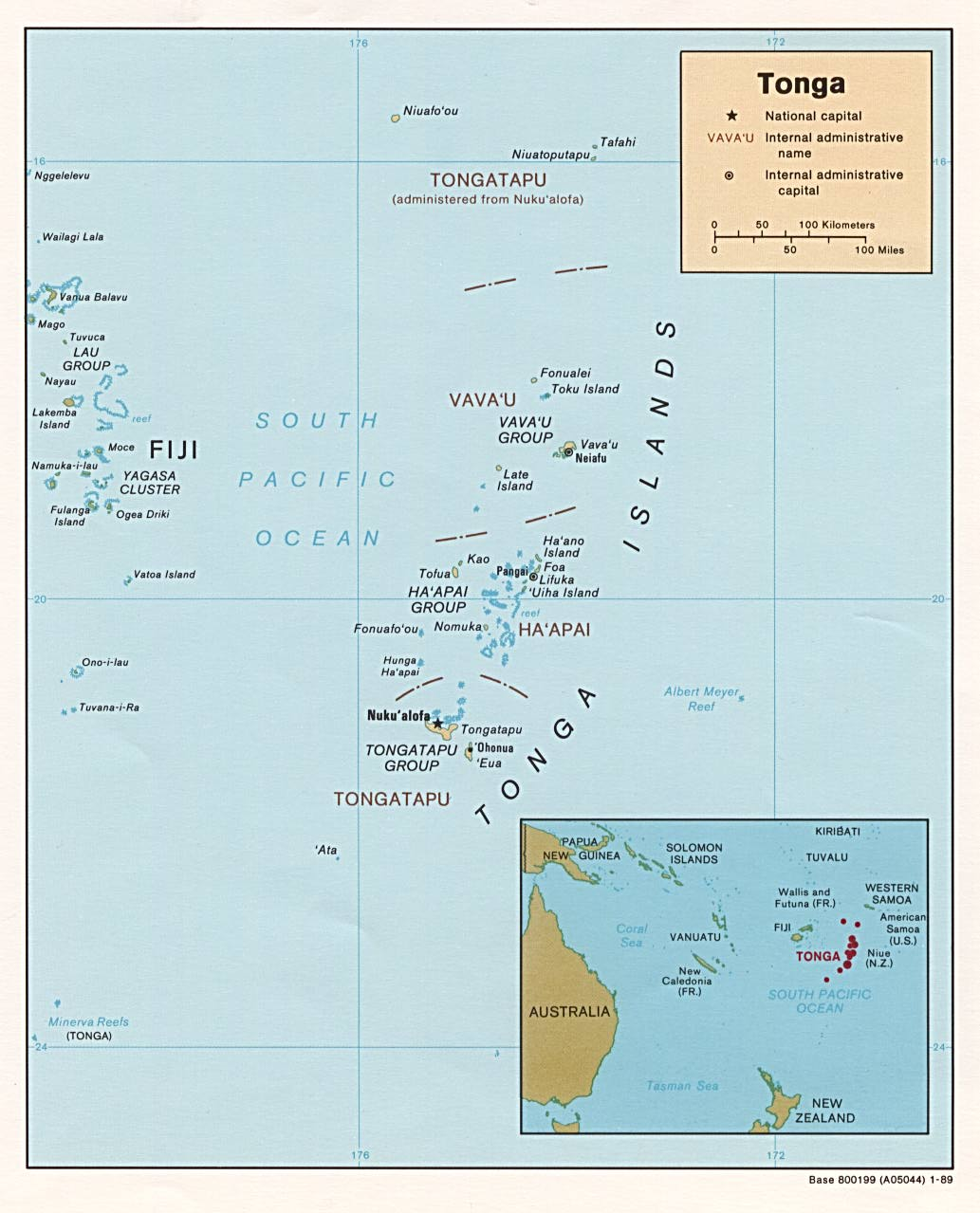
An enlargeable map of the Kingdom of Tonga

The following outline is provided as an overview of and topical guide to Tonga:

Tonga is a sovereign island nation located in the South Pacific Ocean. Tonga comprises the Tonga Archipelago of 169 islands, 36 of them inhabited, stretching over a distance of about 800 kilometres (500 mi) in a north–south line. The islands lie south of Samoa and are about one-third of the way from New Zealand to Hawaii.

Tonga is the only surviving monarchy among the island nations of the Pacific Ocean, as well as being the only island nation never to have been formally colonized.

The islands are also known as the Friendly Islands because of the friendly reception accorded to Captain Cook on his first visit in 1773. He happened to arrive at the time of the ʻinasi festival, the yearly donation of the first fruits to the Tu'i Tonga, the islands' paramount chief, and was invited to the festivities. According to the writer William Mariner, in reality the chiefs had wanted to kill Cook during the gathering, but had been unable to agree on a plan.

== General reference ==
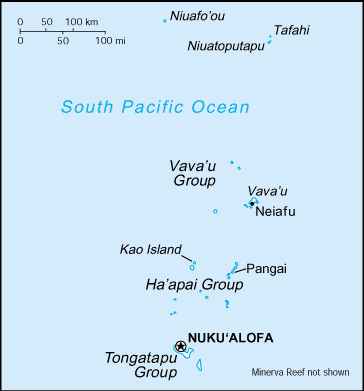
An enlargeable basic map of Tonga

- Pronunciation:
- Common English country name: Tonga
- Official English country name: The Kingdom of Tonga
- Common and official endonyms: see list
  - Official endonym: Puleʻanga Fakatuʻi ʻo Tonga (long form) Tonga (short form)
- Adjectival(s): Tongan
- Demonym(s): Tongan
- Etymology: Name of Tonga
- ISO country codes: TO, TON, 776
- ISO region codes: See ISO 3166-2:TO
- Internet country code top-level domain: .to

== Geography of Tonga ==
Geography of Tonga

- Tonga is: an island country of 169 islands, 36 of which are inhabited
- Location:
  - Southern Hemisphere and Western Hemisphere
  - Pacific Ocean
    - South Pacific Ocean
      - Oceania
        - Polynesia
  - Time zone: UTC+13
  - Extreme points of Tonga
    - High: unnamed location on Kao Island 1,033 m (3,389 ft)
    - Low: South Pacific Ocean 0 m
  - Land boundaries: none
  - Coastline: South Pacific Ocean 419 km
- Population of Tonga: 100,000 - 187th most populous country
- Area of Tonga: 748 km^{2}
- Atlas of Tonga

=== Environment of Tonga ===
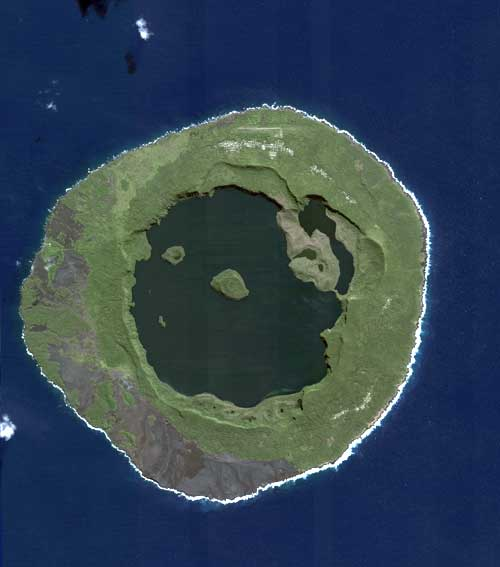
An enlargeable satellite image of the caldera island of Niuafoʻou in Tonga

- Climate of Tonga
- Renewable energy in Tonga
- Geology of Tonga
- Protected areas of Tonga
  - Biosphere reserves in Tonga
  - National parks of Tonga
- Wildlife of Tonga
  - Fauna of Tonga
    - Birds of Tonga
    - Mammals of Tonga

==== Natural geographic features of Tonga ====
- Islands of Tonga
- Lakes of Tonga
- Mountains of Tonga
  - Volcanoes in Tonga
- Rivers of Tonga
  - Waterfalls of Tonga
- Valleys of Tonga
- World Heritage Sites in Tonga: None

=== Regions of Tonga ===
Regions of Tonga

==== Ecoregions of Tonga ====
List of ecoregions in Tonga

- Tongan tropical moist forests

==== Administrative divisions of Tonga ====
Administrative divisions of Tonga

- Ha'apai
- Tongatapu
- Vava'u
- Capital of Tonga: Nukuʻalofa
- Cities of Tonga

=== Demography of Tonga ===
Demographics of Tonga

== Government and politics of Tonga ==
Politics of Tonga

- Form of government: constitutional monarchy
- Capital of Tonga: Nukuʻalofa
- Elections in Tonga
- Political parties in Tonga

=== Branches of the government of Tonga ===
Government of Tonga

==== Executive branch of the government of Tonga ====
- Head of state: King of Tonga, Tupou VI
- Head of government: Prime Minister of Tonga, Lord Tuʻivakano
- Cabinet of Tonga

==== Legislative branch of the government of Tonga ====
- Legislative Assembly of Tonga (unicameral)

==== Judicial branch of the government of Tonga ====
Court system of Tonga

- Privy Council of Tonga
- Court of Appeal of Tonga (supreme court)

=== Foreign relations of Tonga ===
Foreign relations of Tonga

- Diplomatic missions in Tonga
- Diplomatic missions of Tonga

==== International organization membership ====
The Kingdom of Tonga is a member of:

- African, Caribbean, and Pacific Group of States (ACP)
- Asian Development Bank (ADB)
- Commonwealth of Nations
- Food and Agriculture Organization (FAO)
- Group of 77 (G77)
- International Bank for Reconstruction and Development (IBRD)
- International Civil Aviation Organization (ICAO)
- International Criminal Police Organization (Interpol)
- International Development Association (IDA)
- International Federation of Red Cross and Red Crescent Societies (IFRCS)
- International Finance Corporation (IFC)
- International Fund for Agricultural Development (IFAD)
- International Hydrographic Organization (IHO)
- International Maritime Organization (IMO)
- International Mobile Satellite Organization (IMSO)
- International Monetary Fund (IMF)
- International Olympic Committee (IOC)
- International Red Cross and Red Crescent Movement (ICRM)
- International Telecommunication Union (ITU)
- International Trade Union Confederation (ITUC)
- Organisation for the Prohibition of Chemical Weapons (OPCW)
- Pacific Islands Forum (PIF)
- Secretariat of the Pacific Community (SPC)
- South Pacific Regional Trade and Economic Cooperation Agreement (Sparteca)
- United Nations (UN)
- United Nations Conference on Trade and Development (UNCTAD)
- United Nations Educational, Scientific, and Cultural Organization (UNESCO)
- United Nations Industrial Development Organization (UNIDO)
- Universal Postal Union (UPU)
- World Customs Organization (WCO)
- World Federation of Trade Unions (WFTU)
- World Health Organization (WHO)
- World Intellectual Property Organization (WIPO)
- World Meteorological Organization (WMO)
- World Trade Organization (WTO)

=== Law and order in Tonga ===
Law of Tonga

- Capital punishment in Tonga
- Constitution of Tonga
- Crime in Tonga
- Human rights in Tonga
  - LGBT rights in Tonga
  - Freedom of religion in Tonga
- Tonga Police

=== Military of Tonga ===
Military of Tonga

- His Majesty's Armed Forces
  - Command
    - Commander-in-chief: Tupou VI
    - Minister for HMAF: Siaosi Sovaleni
    - Chief of the Defense Staff: Lord Fielakepa
  - Forces
    - Tongan Land Force
      - Tongan Royal Guards
      - Royal Tongan Marines
      - Combined Logistics and Technical Support
    - Tongan Maritime Force
    - Air Wing of Tonga
    - Special forces of Tonga
- Military history of Tonga
- Military ranks of Tonga

=== Local government in Tonga ===
Local government in Tonga

== History of Tonga ==
History of Tonga

- Timeline of the history of Tonga
- Current events of Tonga
- Military history of Tonga

== Culture of Tonga ==
Culture of Tonga

- Architecture of Tonga
- Cuisine of Tonga
- Festivals in Tonga
- Languages of Tonga
- Media in Tonga
- National symbols of Tonga
  - Coat of arms of Tonga
  - Flag of Tonga
  - National anthem of Tonga
- People of Tonga
- Public holidays in Tonga
- Records of Tonga
- Religion in Tonga
  - Christianity in Tonga
  - Hinduism in Tonga
  - Islam in Tonga
  - Judaism in Tonga
  - Sikhism in Tonga
- World Heritage Sites in Tonga: None

=== Art in Tonga ===
- Art in Tonga
- Cinema of Tonga
- Literature of Tonga
- Music of Tonga
- Television in Tonga
- Theatre in Tonga

=== Sports in Tonga ===
Sports in Tonga

- Football in Tonga
- Tonga at the Olympics

== Economy and infrastructure of Tonga ==
Economy of Tonga

- Economic rank, by nominal GDP (2007): 185th (one hundred and eighty fifth)
- Agriculture in Tonga
- Banking in Tonga
  - National Bank of Tonga
- Communications in Tonga
  - Internet in Tonga
- Companies of Tonga
- Currency of Tonga: Pa'anga
  - ISO 4217: TOP
- Energy in Tonga
  - Energy policy of Tonga
  - Oil industry in Tonga
- Mining in Tonga
- Tourism in Tonga
- Transport in Tonga

== Education in Tonga ==
Education in Tonga

== Health in Tonga ==
Nuku'alofa and Neiafu have hospitals equipped with limited emergency and outpatient facilities. Elsewhere, medical facilities and medications are extremely limited. People with serious medical conditions are typically referred to New Zealand for treatment.

== Infrastructure of Tonga ==
- Health care in Tonga
- Transportation in Tonga
  - Airports in Tonga
  - Rail transport in Tonga
  - Roads in Tonga
- Water supply and sanitation in Tonga

== See also ==
Tonga

- Index of Tonga-related articles
- List of international rankings
- List of Tonga-related topics
- Member state of the Commonwealth of Nations
- Member state of the United Nations
- Outline of geography
- Outline of Oceania
