= Economy of Tonga =

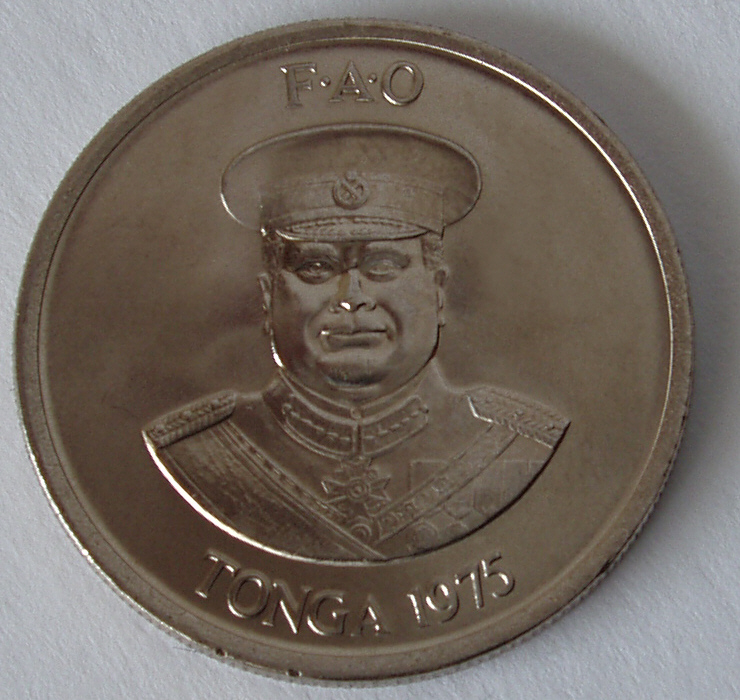
- A Tongan coin
- Currency: Tongan paʻanga (T$)
- Fiscal year: 1 July – 30 June
- Trade organisations: none

Statistics
- GDP: ▲$0.591 billion (nominal, 2023); ▲$0.816 billion (PPP, 2023)
- GDP rank: 187th (nominal) / 183rd (PPP)
- GDP growth: 4.7 (2016) 2.7% (2017); 1.5% (2018) 3.5% (2019e)
- GDP per capita: ▲$4,858 (nominal, 2018); ▲$6,148 (PPP, 2018)
- GDP by sector: agriculture: 20.4%, industry: 18.6%, services: 61% (2011 est.)
- Inflation (CPI): 2.914% (2018)
- Population below national poverty line: 16% (FY09/10)
- Labour force: ▼33,628 (2023); ▼52.2% employment rate (2022)
- Labour force by occupation: agriculture 31.8%, industry 30.6%, services 37.6% (2003 est.)
- Unemployment: 8% (FY09/10)
- Main industries: tourism, construction, fishing

External
- Exports: $62 million (f.o.b., 2010)
- Export goods: squash, fish, vanilla beans, root crops, domain names
- Main export partners: United States 22%; South Africa 17.8%; New Zealand 15.3%; Australia 13.2%; South Korea 10.6%; Hong Kong 9.7% (2021)
- Imports: $92 million (f.o.b., 2010)
- Import goods: foodstuffs, machinery and transport equipment, fuels, chemicals
- Main import partners: New Zealand 35.8%; China 20.2%; Fiji 17.7%; Australia 6.1% (2021)

Public finance
- Government debt: $50 million (2010)
- Revenue: $109.5 million (2011 est.)
- Spending: $109.5 million (2011 est.)
- Economic aid: Australia $5.5 million, New Zealand $2.3 million (FY01/02)
- All values, unless otherwise stated, are in US dollars.

Tonga's economy is characterized by a large nonmonetary sector and a heavy dependence on remittances from the half of the country's population that lives abroad, chiefly in Australia, New Zealand, and the United States. Much of the monetary sector of the economy is dominated, if not owned, by the royal family and nobles. This is particularly true of the telecommunications and satellite services. Much of small business, particularly retailing on Tongatapu, is now dominated by recent Chinese immigrants who arrived under a cash-for-passports scheme that ended in 1998.

The manufacturing sector consists of handicrafts and a few other very smallscale industries, all of which contribute only about 3% of GDP. Commercial business activities also are inconspicuous and, to a large extent, are dominated by the same large trading companies found throughout the South Pacific. In September 1974, the country's first commercial trading bank, the Bank of Tonga, opened.

Rural Tongans rely on plantation and subsistence agriculture. Coconuts, vanilla beans, and bananas are the major cash crops. The processing of coconuts into copra and desiccated coconut is the only significant industry. Pigs and poultry are the major types of livestock. Horses are kept for draft purposes, primarily by farmers working their api. More cattle are being raised, and beef imports are declining.

Tonga's development plans emphasize a growing private sector, upgrading agricultural productivity, revitalizing the squash and vanilla bean industries, developing tourism, and improving the island's communications and transportation systems. A small but growing construction sector is developing in response to the inflow of aid monies and remittances from Tongans abroad. The copra industry is plagued by world prices that have been depressed for years.

Efforts are being made to discover ways to diversify. One hope is seen in fisheries; tests have shown that sufficient skipjack tuna pass through Tongan waters to support a fishing industry. Another potential development activity is exploitation of forests, which cover 35% of the kingdom's land area but are decreasing as land is cleared. Coconut trees past their prime bearing years also provide a potential source of lumber.

The tourist industry is relatively undeveloped; however, the government recognizes that tourism can play a major role in economic development, and efforts are being made to increase this source of revenue. Cruise ships often stop in Nukuʻalofa and Vavaʻu.

According to the CIA World Factbook,

The Tongan economy's base is agriculture, which contributes 30% to GDP. Squash, coconuts, bananas, and vanilla beans are the main crops, and agricultural exports make up two-thirds of total exports. The country must import a high proportion of its food, mainly from New Zealand. The industrial sector accounts for only 10% of GDP. Tourism is the primary source of hard currency earnings. The country remains dependent on sizable external aid and remittances to offset its trade deficit. The government is emphasizing the development of the private sector, especially the encouragement of investment.

== Sectors ==
=== Agriculture ===
Agriculture in Tonga is largely based on the farming of yams, squash, and root crops. Agriculture consists of 16–29.9% of Tonga's GDP, 34% of its labour force, and about 50% of its exports. Since the 1980s, Tonga's agricultural exports expanded to include vanilla, watermelons, sugar, and legumes.

With the expansion of the archipelago's population, climate change, and competitive markets, Tonga has trouble keeping up with competitive demand.

Main agricultural products are squash, coconuts, copra, bananas, vanilla beans, cocoa, coffee, ginger, black pepper and fish

Tonga produced in 2018:

- 148 thousand tons of coconut;
- 20 thousand tons of squash;
- 6.7 thousand tons of cassava;
- 6.4 thousand tons of sweet potato;
- 6 thousand tons of vegetable;
- 4.5 thousand tons of yam;

In addition to smaller productions of other agricultural products.

=== Transport ===
Transport in Tonga includes road, air and water-based infrastructure. There are 680 km of highways in Tonga, of which 184 km are paved, and there are a number of air and seaports.

There are three harbours in Tonga: Neiafu, Nukuʻalofa and Pangai, and in terms of merchant marine, the country possesses seven ships that exceed 1,000 GT, whose masses combined total 17,760 GT. By type, there is one bulk ship, two cargo ships, two liquefied gas ships, one petroleum tanker and roll-on/roll-off ship, the MV ‘Otuanga’ofa.

By 1999 estimates, there are six airports in Tonga. Of these, only Fuaʻamotu International Airport on Tongatapu has paved runways. Of the remaining airports, one has runways exceeding length 1,524 m, two have runways longer than 914 m, with the remaining two having runways shorter than 914 m.

There was formerly a railway in Nuku'alofa, but it no longer exists.

Currently, Bajaj RE and Bajaj Qute are used in Nuku'alofa as taxi.

=== Telecommunications ===
Telecommunications in Tonga include radio, television, telephones, and the Internet.

=== Energy ===
In 2021 the Tongan government committed to a target of 70% renewable energy by 2030.

In July 2012 Tonga Power opened Tonga's first solar photovoltaic generator, the 1.32 MW Maama Mai Solar Farm on Tongatapu. This was followed by a 6MW solar farm spread across three sites on Tongatapu. A pair of 13 MW / 24 MWh grid batteries began operating on the main island in 2022. An Outer Islands Renewable Energy Project is installing solar / battery systems on nine smaller islands, and upgrading the electrical grids on 'Eua and Vava'u.

Electricity – production: 53 GW·h (2008)

Electricity – production by source:

- foclear:
  - fossil fuel: 92%
  - nuclear: 0%
- hydro: 0%
- renewables: 8% (2009)

Electricity – consumption: 38,13 GW·h (2003)

Electricity – exports: 0 kW·h (2003)

Electricity – imports: 0 kW·h (2003)

== Other data ==
Currency: 1 paʻanga (T$) = 100 seniti

Exchange rates: paʻanga (T$) per US$1 – 1.9716 (2004), 2.142 (2003), 2.1952 (2002), 2.1236 (2001), 1.6250 (November 1999), 1.4921 (1998), 1.2635 (1997), 1.2323 (1996), 1.2709 (1995)
