= Mata ʻo e Laʻa Solar Facility =

Photovoltaic power plant in Vaini, Tongatapu, Tonga

Mata ‘o e La‘a Solar Facility
- Country: Tonga
- Location: Vaini, Tongatapu
- Coordinates: 21°11′23.9″S 175°11′24.6″W
- Status: Operational
- Construction began: 2014
- Commission date: 29 May 2015
- Construction cost: US$14.7 million

Power generation
- Nameplate capacity: 1 MW

The Mata ‘o e La‘a Solar Facility or Vaini Solar Facility is a photovoltaic power plant in Vaini, Tongatapu, Tonga.

== History ==
The construction of the power plant started in 2014. It was then officially opened by King Tupou VI on 29 May 2015.

== Technical specifications ==
The power plant has an installed capacity of 1 MW. The plant is connected to Maama Mai Solar Farm through 15 km long fiber-optic cable.

== Finance ==
The power plant was constructed at a cost of US$14.7 million funded by the Japan International Cooperation Agency.

== See also ==
- Economy of Tonga
