= Tongan Air Wing =

Tonga Air Wing
- Roundel of the Tongan Air Wing
- Active: 4 May 1996
- Country: Tonga
- Branch: His Majesty's Armed Forces of Tonga
- Type: Aviation
- Role: Aerial reconnaissance Airlift; Search and rescue Support to Land and Maritime force's
- Size: 10 personnel 1 aircraft (+1 another aircraft available)
- Part of: His Majesty's Armed Forces of Tonga

Commanders
- Commander-in-Chief: HM King Tupou VI
- Minister for HMAF: Tupoutoʻa ʻUlukalala
- Chief of Defense Staff: Brigadier General Lord Fielakepa

Aircraft flown
- Transport: Citabria

The Tongan Air Wing is the aerial arm of His Majesty's Armed Forces of Tonga.

== Operations ==
The Air Wing conducts aerial reconnaissance and surveillance of the exclusive economic zone (EEZ) and the provision of airlift, search and rescue, and support to Land and Maritime Force operations.

== History ==
Tonga's first attempt to start an air wing happened in 1986, when a Victa Airtourer light aircraft was obtained. However, the aircraft was re-sold soon after. On 4 May 1996, the air wing was created successfully, with Tonga obtaining a Beech 18. In 1999, Tonga obtained a Citabria to assist with training. In 2008, a new aircraft was promised by the Chinese Ambassador to Tonga - Fan Guijin, this aircraft was a Harbin Y-12 and delivered to the Tongan Government and went to the state owned Lulutai Airlines. With the decommissioning of the Beech 18 an agreement was entered into with Lulutai Airlines that if the HMAF urgently required a aircraft for Medical or Search and Rescue tasking they could charter the Harbin Y-12 and it would be flown by the HMAF Pilot's and Tongan Air Wing crews.

== Aircraft ==
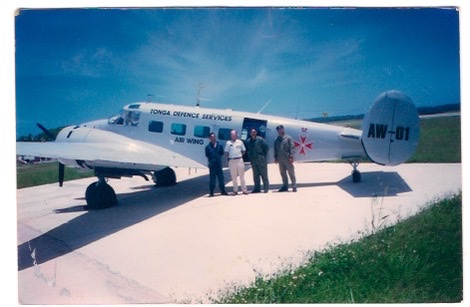
The Beech 18 aircraft on 7 May 1996.

=== Current aircraft ===
The Tongan Air Wing is not mentioned at all in the World Air Forces 2026 report by FlightGlobal. This suggests that the Tongan Air Wing is small (or nonexistent) in size.

Aircraft	Origin	Type	Variant	In service	Notes
Transport
Citabria	United States	Transport		1	
Harbin Y-12	China	Transport		1	Owned and operated by Lulutai Airlines, available to the Tongan Air Wing

=== Retired aircraft ===
Formerly operated aircraft include a Beech 18 G18S and a Victa Airtourer.
