= Maama =

Maama may refer to:

== People ==
- Maama Molitika (born 1974), Tongan rugby union player
- Maama Vaipulu (born 1989), New Zealand rugby player
- ʻAta Maama Tu’utafaiva (born 1997), Tongan athlete
- Maama Uganda, Ugandan woman known for birthing 44 children

== Other uses ==
- Maama Mai Solar Farm, power plant in Tonga
