= Transport in Tonga =

Transport in Tonga includes road, air and water-based infrastructure. There are 680 km of highways in Tonga, of which 184 km are paved, and there are a number of air and seaports.

There are three harbours in Tonga: Neiafu, Nukuʻalofa and Pangai, and in terms of merchant marine, the country possesses seven ships that exceed 1,000 GT, whose masses combined total 17,760 GT. By type, there is one bulk ship, two cargo ships, two liquefied gas ships, one petroleum tanker and roll-on/roll-off ship, the MV ‘Otuanga’ofa.

By 1999 estimates, there are six airports in Tonga. Of these, only Fuaʻamotu International Airport on Tongatapu has paved runways. Of the remaining airports, one has runways exceeding length 1,524 m, two have runways longer than 914 m, with the remaining two having runways shorter than 914 m.

There was formerly a railway in Nuku'alofa, but it no longer exists.

Currently, Bajaj RE and Bajaj Qute are used in Nuku'alofa as taxi.
