= Military history of Tonga =

The military history of Tonga extends from before European contact, through the 20th-century world wars, to the present day, with Tonga participating in World War I, World War II, and the Afghan war, among other conflicts.

== World Wars ==
Tonga participated in World War I, as part of the New Zealand Expeditionary Force.

The Tonga Defence Service (TDS) came into existence at the beginning of World War II in 1939. In 1943, New Zealand helped train two Tongan contingents of two thousand personnel who fought in the Solomon Islands Campaign. In addition, New Zealand and US troops were stationed on Tongatapu, which became a staging point for shipping.

At the end of World War II, the TDS was disbanded, but was re-formed in 1946.

== Peacekeeping Operations ==
Former Prime Minister Prince Lavaka Ata 'Ulukalala (now King Tupou VI) joined the naval arm of the Tonga Defence Service in 1982 and became Lieutenant-Commander of the defence force in 1987. From 1990 to 1995 he commanded the PPB VOEA Pangai and his time in charge included peacekeeping operations in Bougainville.

In 2002, TDS soldiers were deployed as part of a multi-national regional peacekeeping force in the Solomon Islands. In July 2004, a forty-five personnel contingent of the TDS served in the Solomon Islands. A third contingent was sent in July 2005. This contingent consisted of thirty-three TDS troops, and was expected to remain four months.

== Iraq War ==
In March 2003, military-to-military talks began between Tonga and the United States about Tonga providing personnel for the Multinational force in Iraq. Support arrangements were finalised in May 2004. Forty-five Royal Tongan Marines, led by the Chief of Defence of the Tonga Defence Services, Colonel Tau'aika 'Uta'atu, departed Tonga on 13 June 2004. From July 2004, the Royal Tonga Marines were augmenting the 1st Marine Expeditionary Forces (MEF) in the Al Anbar Province of Iraq. The Royal Marines supported the 1st Marine Division's security and stabilisation mission at Camp Blue Diamond. Tonga first served with the 1st MEF on the Solomon Island during World War II. The Royal Tongan Marines returned from Iraq in December 2004. In December 2008, the Tonga Defence Services ended their mission in the Iraq War and returned home.

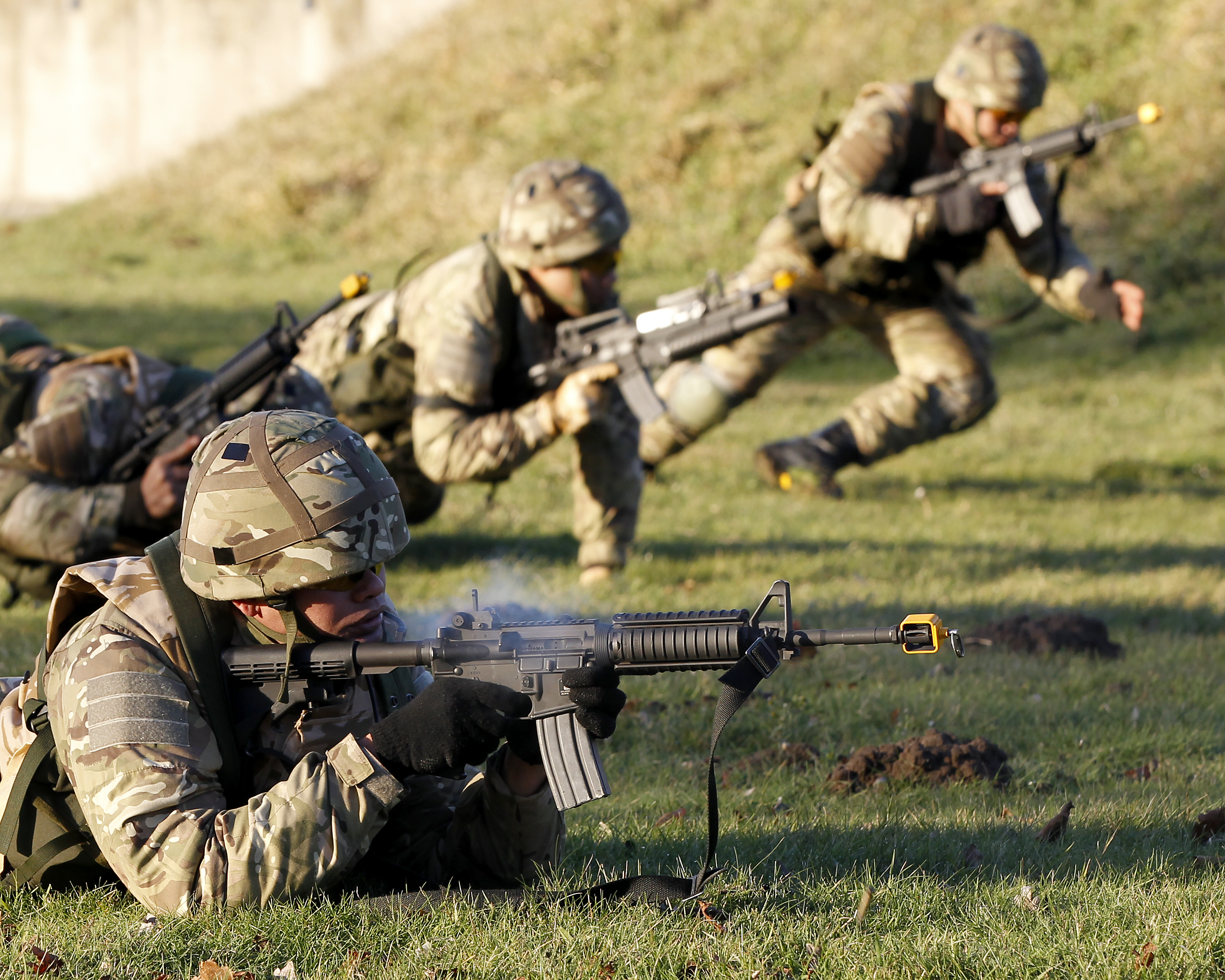
Tongan troops training in England with the Royal Air Force Regiment in 2010.

In 2006, TDS soldiers, in co-operation with local police, were deployed to deal with the Nuku'alofa riots.

== Afghan War ==
In 2010, Tongan troops began training with the RAF Regiment, in preparation for operations in Afghanistan; the first troops deployed to Afghanistan during February 2011. Tonga's military size was approximately 450 troops, half of which were sent to fight in the War in Afghanistan, serving in Camp Bastion and Camp Leatherneck. During the September 2012 Camp Bastion raid Tonga troops were in perimeter guard towers without any night-vision devices. In September 2013, Tonga Defence Services were officially renamed into His Majesty's Armed Forces (HMAF). In April 2014, the Royal Tongan Marines ended their mission supporting Operation Enduring Freedom in Afghanistan.
