= Royal Tongan Marines =

- Active: 10 March 1973
- Country: Tonga
- Branch: Tongan Land Force
- Type: Marines
- Role: Light infantry
- Size: 100 Personnel
- Part of: His Majesty's Armed Forces
- Headquarters: Taliai Military Camp Fuaʻamotu
- Mottos: Terra Marique (Latin) ("Land and Sea")

The Royal Tongan Marines is the primary light infantry force of the His Majesty's Armed Forces of Tonga, it is headquartered at Taliai Military Camp Fuaʻamotu.

The Royal Tongan Marines are trained and equip as a Light Infantry amphibious and Counter-insurgency force that can operate in jungle, littoral and urban environments

== Operational history ==
The Royal Tongan Marines' history includes cooperating with international military forces for training and operational purposes, counterinsurgency, and peacekeeping missions.

In 2002, Royal Tongan Marines were deployed with Regional Assistance Mission to Solomon Islands, then in 2004 they sent a contingent of 45, and a third contingent in 2005.

A contingent of 45 marines from the Royal Tongan Marines participated in the Iraq War. The contingent was deployed in 2003 to support operations in Al Anbar Province.

In 2006 Royal Tongan Marines were deployed to assist local police in managing civil unrest as part of the Nuku'alofa riots.

A contingent from the Royal Tongan Marines participated in the War in Afghanistan. The contingent was honoured at an awards presentation on 5 February 2008 at Al-Faw Palace.

== Unique traditions ==
Royal Tongan Marines are known for performing the traditional Sipi Tau, a Tongan war dance on formal occasions, such as transfer of authority ceremonies during deployments, and a response in kind to other war dances like the Maori Haka Peruperu performed by New Zealand Defence Force personnel.

== Organization ==
The Royal Tongan Marines consists of a headquarters, with three light infantry marine platoons.

== See also ==
- His Majesty's Armed Forces (Tonga)
- Fuaʻamotu International Airport
