= MV 'Otuanga'ofa =

Inter-island ferry

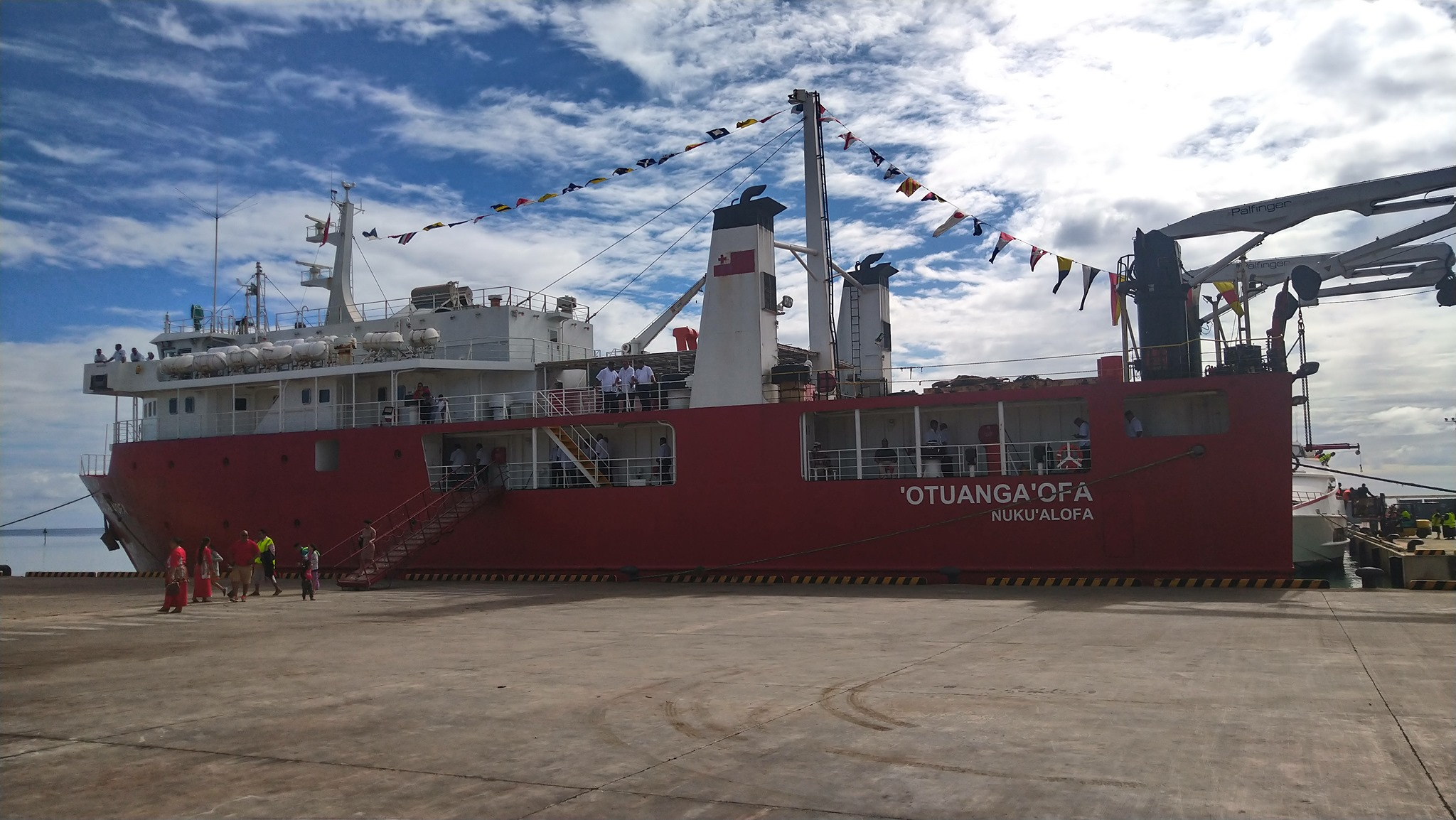
- MV ʻOtu Angaʻofa at Tongatapu, by Embassy of Japan in the Kingdom of Tonga

History

Tonga
- Name: ‘Otuanga’ofa
- Operator: Friendly Island Shipping Agency
- Completed: 2010
- Home port: Nukuʻalofa
- Identification: IMO number: 9570357
- Status: In service

General characteristics
- Type: Ferry (RORO)
- Tonnage: 1,534 GT; 564 DWT
- Length: 53 m (173 ft 11 in)
- Beam: 13.5 m (44 ft 3 in)
- Complement: 22
- Notes: 400 passengers

MV ʻOtu Angaʻofa ("friendly islands") is an inter-island ferry which has operated in Tonga since 2010. It replaced MV Princess Ashika, which had sunk on 5 August 2009, with 74 people lost at sea.

MV ʻOtu Angaʻofa was built in Japan and was paid for by the Japanese government at a cost of US$16 million. It arrived in Tonga in October 2010, and after a period of testing, entered service with the Friendly Island Shipping Agency in December 2010. It normally operates between Nukuʻalofa, Pangai, and Neiafu.

In January 2012 it collided with a stationary vessel twice at Nukuʻalofa while trying to dock. No injuries were reported, but $50,000 of damage was caused to the MV Sitka. In May 2014 it ran aground at Niuatoputapu. In July 2014 it was sent to Fiji for maintenance after cracks were found inside a ballast tank. In June 2015 the captain was fired after the ship was found to be leaking.

In September 2022 it was sent to Auckland, New Zealand for repairs. On its arrival, it was told to stay outside new Zealand waters for three weeks due to biosecurity risks. The repairs took longer than expected, and the ferry's absence caused significant disruption to the education of students in the Niua Islands, who were unable to travel to Tongatapu for the beginning of the school year. The ferry returned to Tonga in April 2023.

In November 2024, the captain of the vessel, Viliami Makahokovalu Tuputupu, was convicted of operating the vessel without a certificate of competancy and taking it to sea with excess passengers and jailed for two years. He had previously been convicted of identical offences in respect of the MV Princess Ashika disaster.
