= Capital punishment in Tonga =

Capital punishment is legal in Tonga, but has not been imposed since 1982. The country's lack of executions puts it into the category of a state abolitionist in practice, where it retains the death penalty in law but has had a formal or informal moratorium for at least ten years. Tonga's low rate of murder convictions forms part of the reason for the lack of executions, as well as its courts’ apparent unwillingness to impose the penalty unless it appears absolutely necessary to do so.

== Legislation and case law ==
In Tonga, the governing legislation regarding the death penalty is the Criminal Offences Act. This Act includes death in its list of punishments for criminal behaviour. Capital punishment may be imposed for the crimes of murder and treason. It may not be imposed on a pregnant woman. The ban on imposing the death penalty on a pregnant woman was added to the Criminal Offences Act via an amendment in 1939. If a woman convicted of murder or treason alleges that she is pregnant, the question is put to a jury as to whether they are satisfied she is indeed pregnant. The jury who decides this will, as a general rule, be the same jury who convicted her. A person under 15 years old cannot receive the death penalty for murder. However, due to the wording of the Act, it is unclear whether a person under this age may receive death as punishment for treason.

In order for the death penalty to be imposed, the King must assent. He must do so with the consent of the Privy Council of Tonga. The method of execution used is death by hanging. After the execution of the offender, a medical officer must supply a certificate of death. The requirement for a certificate of death was inserted by way of an amendment in 1958. The jury who convicted the offender, alongside a magistrate for the district in which the death sentence was executed, must hold an “inquest” into the body of the offender. The jury is to ascertain the identity of the deceased (that is, he or she is the offender they convicted). The jury must also ensure that the “sentence of death was duly executed on the offender,” meaning that in addition to a medical certificate, the jury must ascertain that the offender is dead. Those who have received the death sentence have their place of burial decided by the Tongan Privy Council – a place is chosen, and every offender executed will be buried in this place. The Tongan Privy Council is also able to make “regulations” regarding executions, for the purposes of “guarding against any abuse in the execution,” “for giving greater solemnity thereto,” and to publicise outside of the prison that an execution is taking place.

=== History ===
A mass execution was carried out in 1887 on the orders of King George Tupou I, when six men convicted of treason for attempting to assassinate premier Shirley Waldemar Baker were executed by firing squad on the small islet of Malinoa off of Nukuʻalofa. A man was hanged for murder in 1971, which was the first hanging in 16 years. There was a further execution in 1977.

The most recent executions in Tonga took place in 1982, when Haloti Sole, Livingi Sole and Fili Esau were hanged for murder. In the same year, the Tongan Parliament discussed abolishing the death penalty, but decided to retain it.

In 2004, the Tongan Legislative Assembly voted on a bill which proposed to introduce the death penalty for possession of illicit drugs. This bill was defeated by the Assembly by a vote of 10–7, indicating that the death penalty, if Tonga continues to retain it, will not spread to become an applicable sentence for other crimes. It is an indication that Tonga wishes to reserve the death penalty for the very serious crimes of murder and treason.

The issue of capital punishment was raised in 2005, when Tevita Siale Vola became the first person in Tonga to be convicted of murder in 24 years. However, Webster CJ did not impose the death penalty, on the basis that Vola's actions did not meet the threshold of "one of the rarest of rare cases where the alternative option of life imprisonment is unquestionably foreclosed." Webster CJ did not make any moral judgment on the death penalty, explaining that it was "a matter for the Government and Parliament" to decide whether the death penalty should be retained in Tonga. The judgment in R v Vola serves as an indicator that Tonga does not impose the death penalty lightly.

== International actions and other states' responses ==
=== General ===
The United Nations presented a moratorium on the death penalty in 2007. Tonga voted against this, and continued to do so in 2008, 2010, and 2012. However, more recently - in 2014 and 2016 - Tonga abstained from voting on this issue.

In the aftermath of the 2006 Nuku‘alofa riots, where several men were suspected of murder, it appeared that these men may never face trial. The Australian government, which formed part of the investigative team for the riots, refused to hand over the autopsy reports of victims for fear of the death penalty being imposed on the suspects.

=== Universal Periodic Review ===
2008 Cycle

In the course of its first Universal Periodic Review cycle in 2008, Tonga received a recommendation from Italy to abolish the death penalty. Tonga responded with a reminder that it had not imposed such a penalty since 1982, and that it welcomed “further opportunities for discussion and debate on this issue.” However, following this cycle, Tonga made no efforts towards abolition of the death penalty. Given that Tonga has ratified few international human rights treaties, it has few international obligations regarding the death penalty.

2012 Cycle

The 2012 cycle brought similar recommendations, this time from a number of States. These included recommendations from Australia, Spain, and the United Kingdom to ratify the Second Optional Protocol to the International Covenant on Civil and Political Rights, which is aimed at the abolition of the death penalty. Tonga is neither a signatory to, nor has it ratified, the ICCPR. As such, Australia and the United Kingdom's recommendations included a suggestion to ratify this Covenant as well. In its response, Tonga said that it had not considered ratifying the ICCPR. However, it referred to R v Vola as authority that the Tongan Courts are applying principles of the ICCPR despite its non-ratification status.

During the 2012 UPR cycle, Italy and Slovakia each made separate recommendations regarding the imposition of the death penalty on people under 18. Italy suggested that Tonga “explicitly prohibit” this, with Slovakia recommending the “immediate” abolition of the death penalty for juvenile offenders. Italy specifically mentioned that this would be in accordance with the Convention on the Rights of the Child and a contemporary resolution of the General Assembly of the United Nations. Tonga has ratified the CRC, which prohibits capital punishment for people aged under 18, regardless of the offence committed.

Tonga's response during this cycle brought to light its determination to retain the death penalty. Despite being an abolitionist in practice, Tonga is essentially a retentionist state as it refuses to abolish capital punishment.

=== Compared to other countries ===
Tonga joins 140 other countries which are abolitionist in law or practice. It is the only country in Oceania that retains capital punishment.
