= Chief of the Defence Staff (Tonga) =

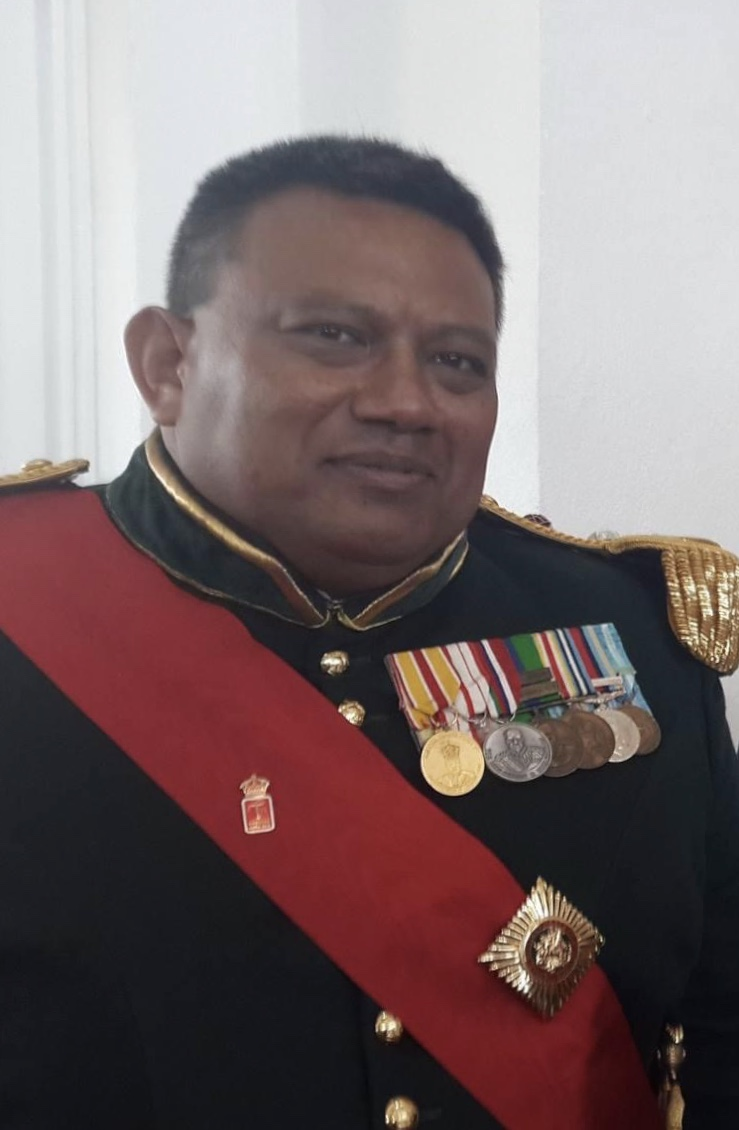
- Incumbent; Brigadier general Tupou Tongapoʻuli Aleamotuʻa since 21 December 2014
- His Majesty's Armed Forces
- Reports to: Minister for HMAF
- Formation: 1977
- First holder: Fetuʻutolu Tupou

The Chief of the Defence Staff is the professional head of the Tongan military. They are responsible for the administration and the operational control of the military.

Until 2013, commanders were called Commander of the Tongan Defence Services. In 2013, the title was changed to Chief of the Defence Staff of the HMAF.

== List of officeholders ==
No.	Portrait	Name (birth–death)	Term of office			Ref.
No.	Portrait	Name (birth–death)	Took office	Left office	Time in office	Ref.
Commander of the Tongan Defence Services
1	Ambassador Fetu'utolu Tupou in Brussels (cropped)	Colonel; Fetuʻutolu Tupou (?–2005)	1977	31 March 2000	22–23 years	
2		Brigadier general Tauʻaika ʻUtaʻatu (born 1956)	31 March 2000	5 November 2013	13 years, 219 days	
Chief of the Defence Staff of the HMAF
2		Brigadier general Tauʻaika ʻUtaʻatu (born 1956)	5 November 2013	21 December 2014	1 year, 46 days	
3		Brigadier general Tupou Tongapoʻuli Aleamotuʻa (born 1966)	21 December 2014	Incumbent	11 years, 260 days	
