= List of birds of Tonga =

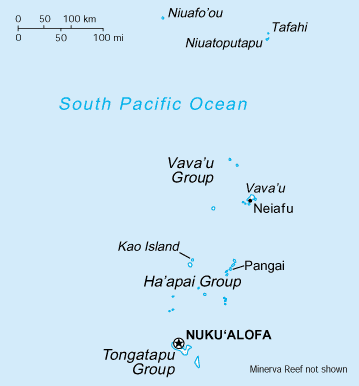
Map of Tonga

This is a list of the bird species recorded in Tonga. The avifauna of Tonga include a total of 88 species, of which two are endemic and five have been introduced by humans. Ten species are globally threatened.

This list's taxonomic treatment (designation and sequence of orders, families and species) and nomenclature (common and scientific names) follow the conventions of The Clements Checklist of Birds of the World, 2022 edition. The family accounts at the beginning of each heading reflect this taxonomy, as do the species counts found in each family account. Introduced and accidental species are included in the total counts for Tonga.

The following tags have been used to highlight several categories. The commonly occurring native species do not fall into any of these categories.

- (A) Accidental: a species that rarely or accidentally occurs in Tonga
- (Ex) Extinct: a species which no longer exists
- (E) Endemic: a species endemic to Tonga
- (I) Introduced: a species introduced to Tonga as a consequence, direct or indirect, of human actions

== Ducks, geese, and waterfowl ==
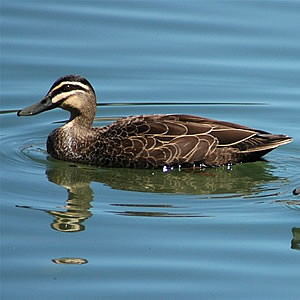
Pacific black duck

Order: Anseriformes Family: Anatidae

Anatidae includes the ducks and most duck-like waterfowl, such as geese and swans. These birds are adapted to an aquatic existence with webbed feet, flattened bills, and feathers that are excellent at shedding water due to an oily coating.

- Pacific black duck, Anas superciliosa
- Northern pintail, Anas acuta (A)

== Megapodes ==
Order: Galliformes Family: Megapodiidae

The Megapodiidae are stocky, medium-large chicken-like birds with small heads and large feet. All but the malleefowl occupy jungle habitats and most have brown or black colouring.

- Niuafoou scrubfowl, Megapodius pritchardii (E)

== Pheasants, grouse, and allies ==
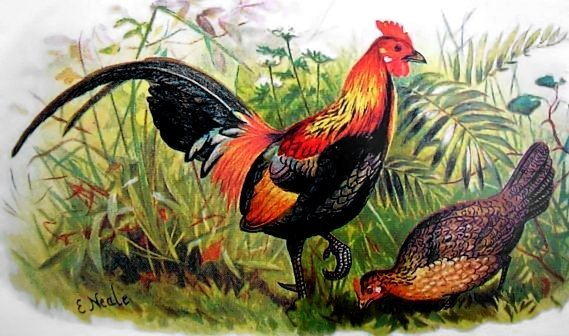
Red junglefowl

Order: Galliformes Family: Phasianidae

The Phasianidae are a family of terrestrial birds which consists of quails, partridges, snowcocks, francolins, spurfowls, tragopans, monals, pheasants, peafowls and jungle fowls. In general, they are plump (although they vary in size) and have broad, relatively short wings.

- Red junglefowl, Gallus gallus

== Pigeons and doves ==
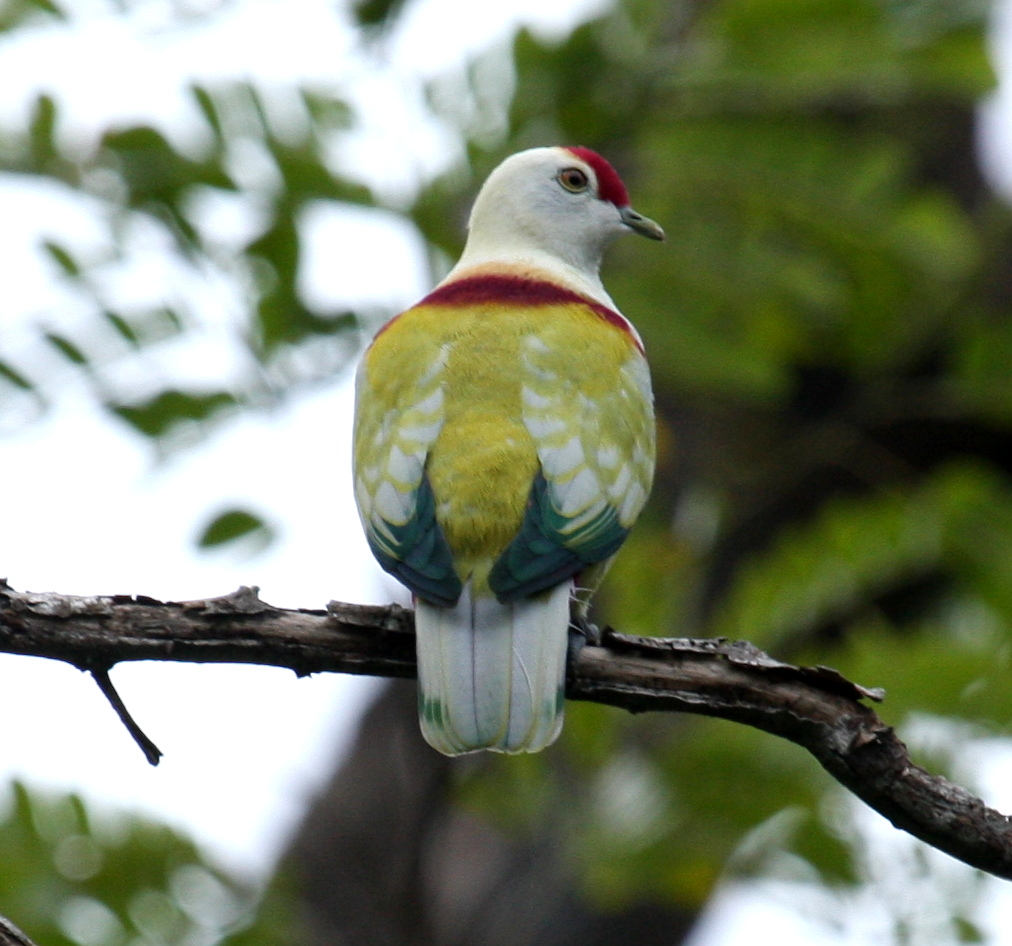
Many-colored fruit-dove

Order: Columbiformes Family: Columbidae

Pigeons and doves are stout-bodied birds with short necks and short slender bills with a fleshy cere.

- Rock pigeon, Columba livia (I)
- Shy ground dove, Alopecoenas stairi
- Many-colored fruit-dove, Ptilinopus perousii
- Crimson-crowned fruit-dove, Ptilinopus porphyraceus
- Pacific imperial-pigeon, Ducula pacifica

== Cuckoos ==
Order: Cuculiformes Family: Cuculidae

The family Cuculidae includes cuckoos, roadrunners and anis. These birds are of variable size with slender bodies, long tails and strong legs. The Old World cuckoos are brood parasites.

- Long-tailed koel, Eudynamys taitensis

== Swifts ==
Order: Caprimulgiformes Family: Apodidae

Swifts are small birds which spend the majority of their lives flying. These birds have very short legs and never settle voluntarily on the ground, perching instead only on vertical surfaces. Many swifts have long swept-back wings which resemble a crescent or boomerang.

- White-rumped swiftlet, Aerodramus spodiopygius
- Australian swiftlet, Aerodramus terraereginae

== Rails, gallinules, and coots ==
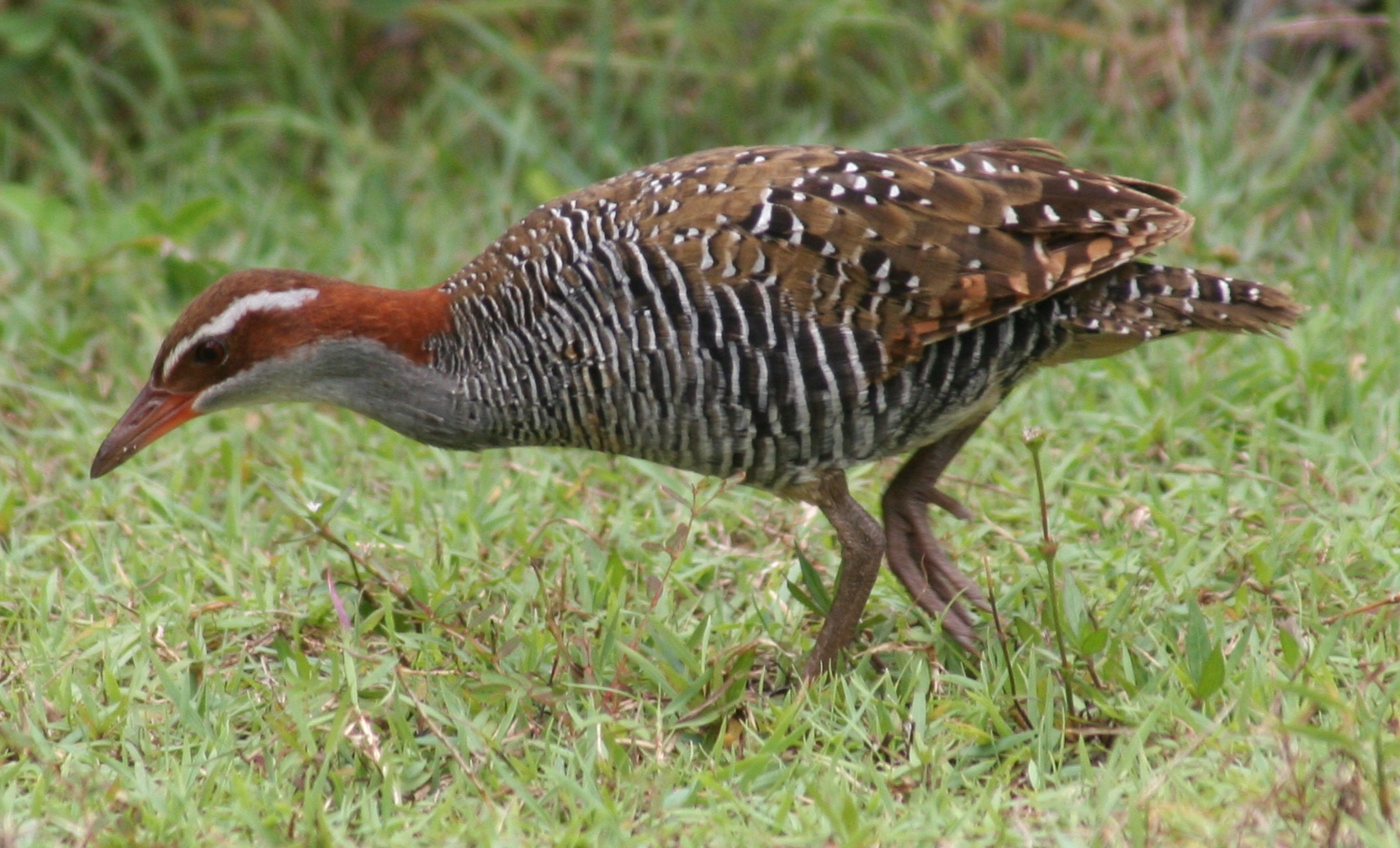
Buff-banded rail

Order: Gruiformes Family: Rallidae

Rallidae is a large family of small to medium-sized birds which includes the rails, crakes, coots and gallinules. Typically they inhabit dense vegetation in damp environments near lakes, swamps or rivers. In general they are shy and secretive birds, making them difficult to observe. Most species have strong legs and long toes which are well adapted to soft uneven surfaces. They tend to have short, rounded wings and to be weak fliers.

- Buff-banded rail, Gallirallus philippensis
- Black-backed swamphen, Porphyrio indicus
- Australasian swamphen, Porphyrio melanotus
- Spotless crake, Zapornia tabuensis

== Plovers and lapwings ==
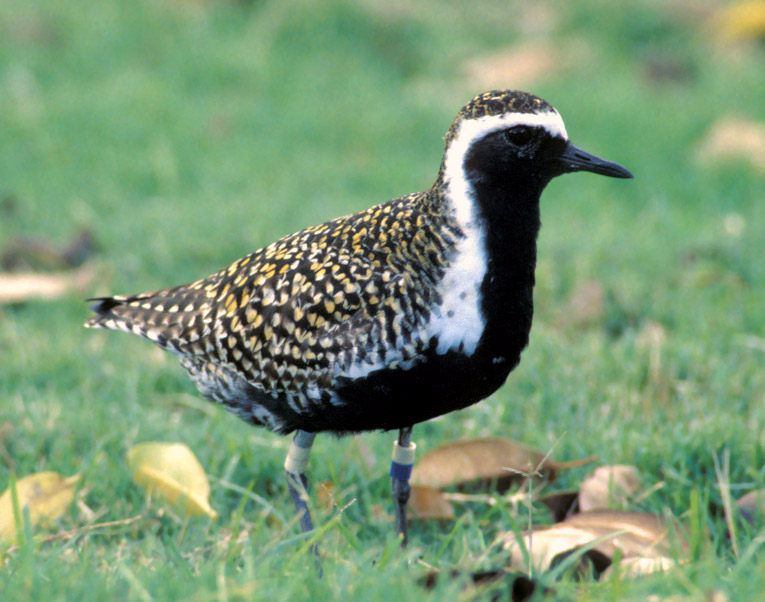
Pacific golden-plover

Order: Charadriiformes Family: Charadriidae

The family Charadriidae includes the plovers, dotterels and lapwings. They are small to medium-sized birds with compact bodies, short, thick necks and long, usually pointed, wings. They are found in open country worldwide, mostly in habitats near water.

- Black-bellied plover, Pluvialis squatarola (A)
- Pacific golden-plover, Pluvialis fulva

== Sandpipers and allies ==
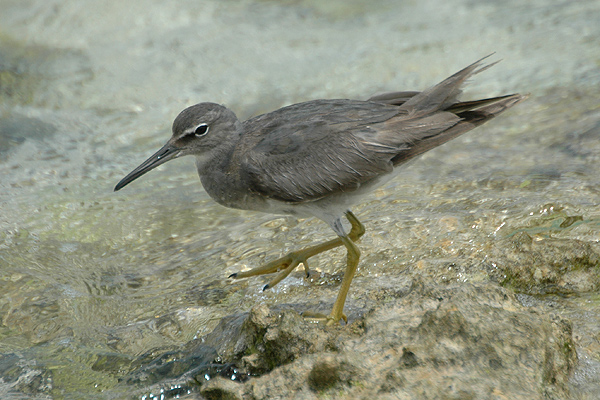
Wandering tattler

Order: Charadriiformes Family: Scolopacidae

Scolopacidae is a large diverse family of small to medium-sized shorebirds including the sandpipers, curlews, godwits, shanks, tattlers, woodcocks, snipes, dowitchers and phalaropes. The majority of these species eat small invertebrates picked out of the mud or soil. Variation in length of legs and bills enables multiple species to feed in the same habitat, particularly on the coast, without direct competition for food.

- Bristle-thighed curlew, Numenius tahitiensis
- Bar-tailed godwit, Limosa lapponica
- Ruddy turnstone, Arenaria interpres
- Sanderling, Calidris alba
- Wandering tattler, Tringa incana

== Skuas and jaegers ==
Order: Charadriiformes Family: Stercorariidae

The family Stercorariidae are, in general, medium to large birds, typically with grey or brown plumage, often with white markings on the wings. They nest on the ground in temperate and arctic regions and are long-distance migrants.

- South polar skua, Stercorarius maccormicki (A)
- Brown skua, Stercorarius antarcticus (A)
- Pomarine jaeger, Stercorarius pomarinus (A)
- Parasitic jaeger, Stercorarius parasiticus (A)

== Gulls, terns, and skimmers ==
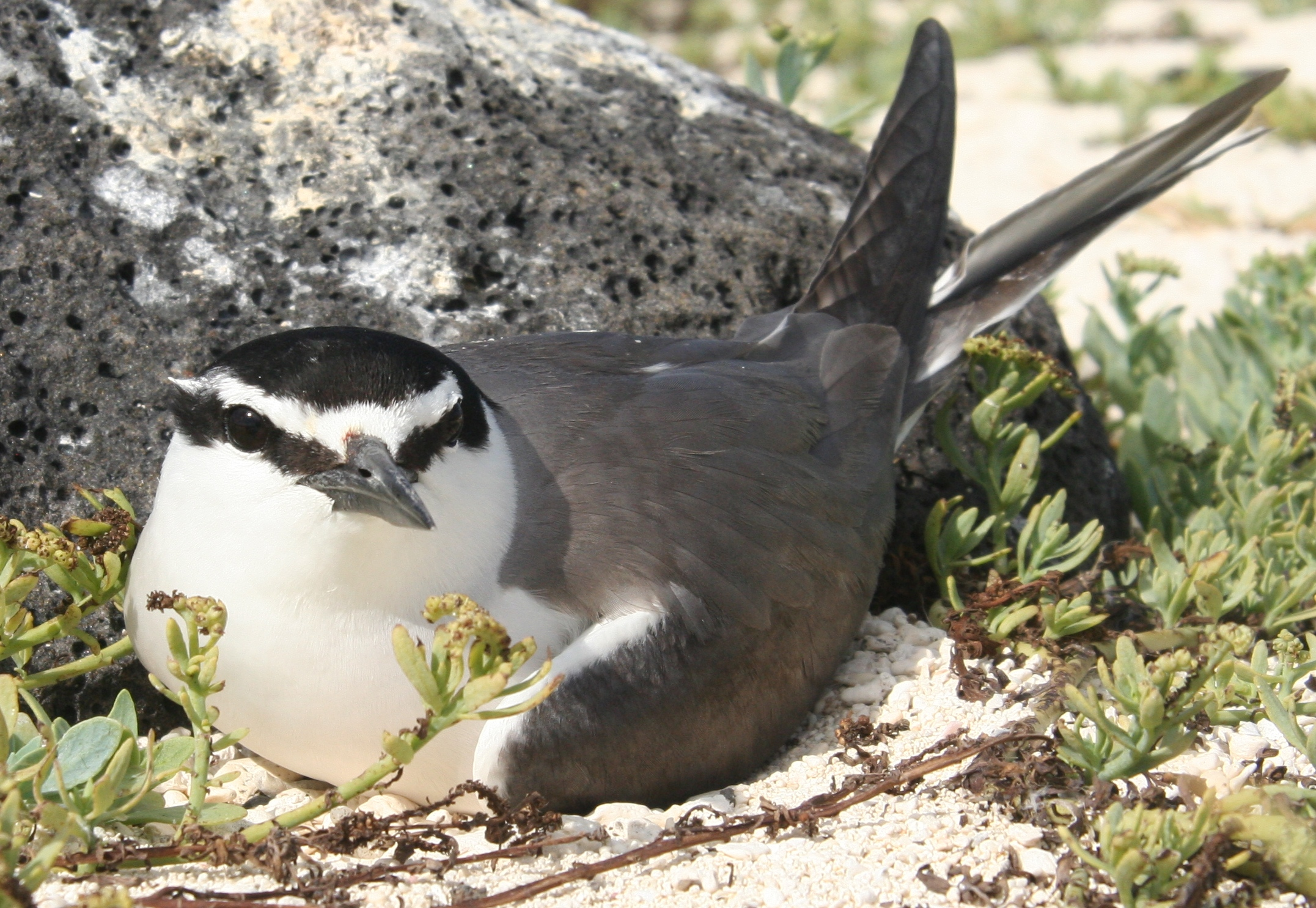
Grey-backed tern

Order: Charadriiformes Family: Laridae

Laridae is a family of medium to large seabirds, the gulls, terns, and skimmers. Gulls are typically grey or white, often with black markings on the head or wings. They have stout, longish bills and webbed feet. Terns are a group of generally medium to large seabirds typically with grey or white plumage, often with black markings on the head. Most terns hunt fish by diving but some pick insects off the surface of fresh water. Terns are generally long-lived birds, with several species known to live in excess of 30 years.

- Brown noddy, Anous stolidus
- Black noddy, Anous minutus
- Gray noddy, Anous albivitta
- Blue-gray noddy, Anous ceruleus
- White tern, Gygis alba
- Sooty tern, Onychoprion fuscatus
- Gray-backed tern, Onychoprion lunatus
- Bridled tern, Onychoprion anaethetus
- Black-naped tern, Sterna sumatrana
- Great crested tern, Thalasseus bergii

== Tropicbirds ==
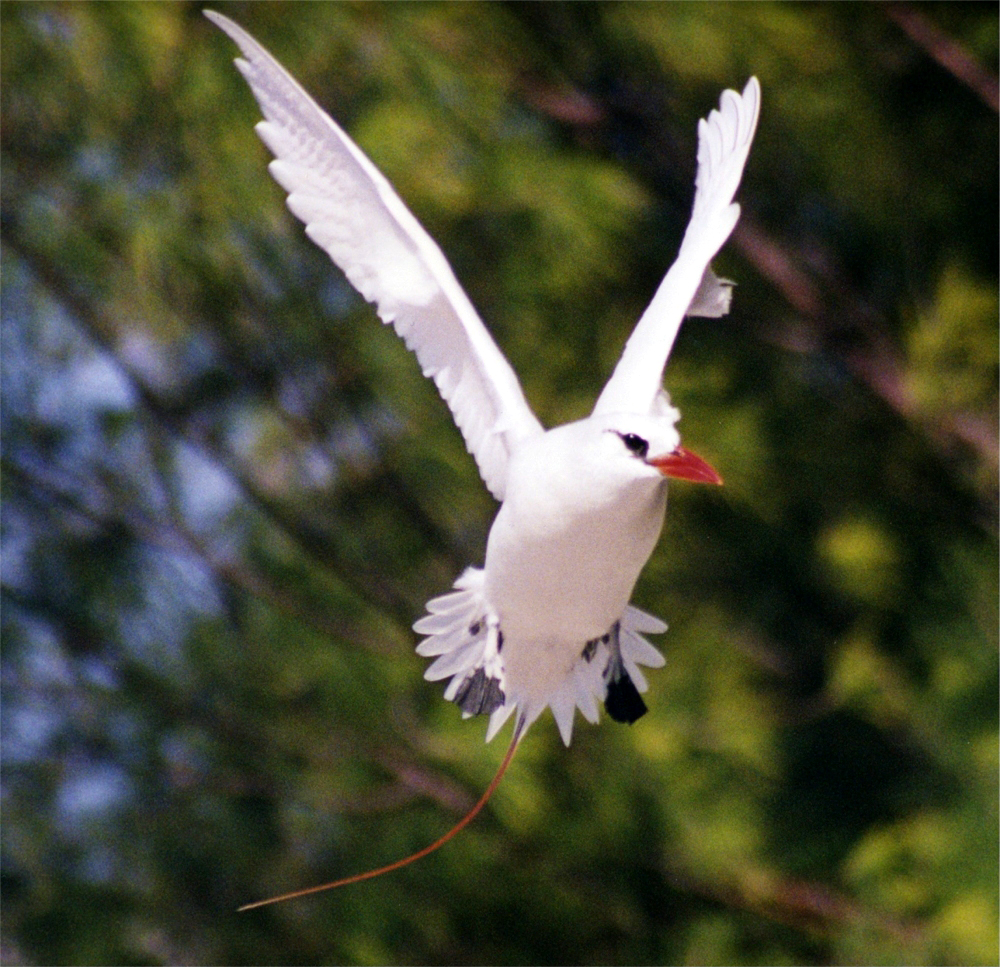
Red-tailed tropicbird

Order: Phaethontiformes Family: Phaethontidae

Tropicbirds are slender white birds of tropical oceans, with exceptionally long central tail feathers. Their heads and long wings have black markings.

- White-tailed tropicbird, Phaethon lepturus
- Red-tailed tropicbird, Phaethon rubricauda

== Albatrosses ==
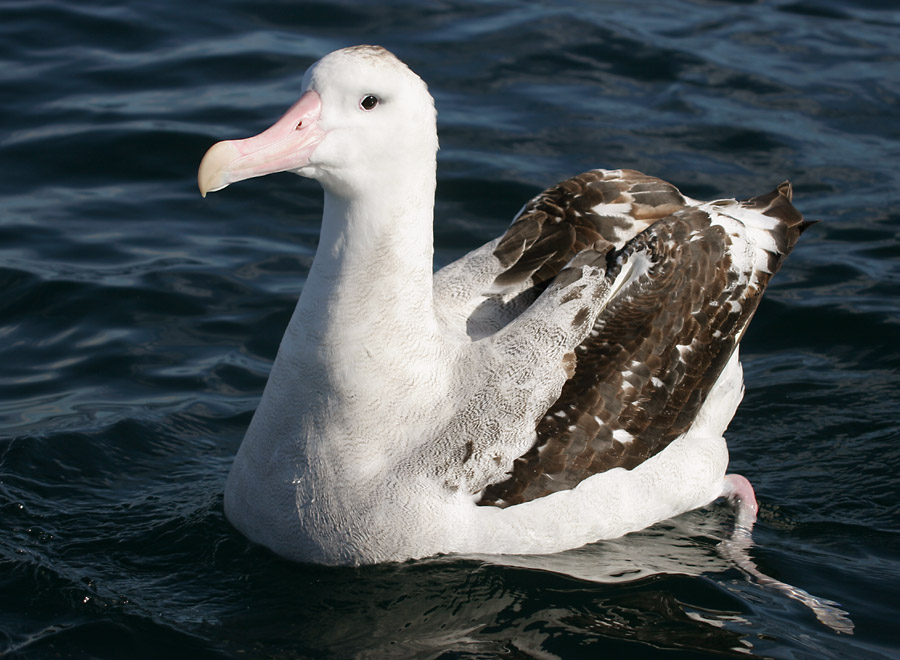
Wandering albatross

Order: Procellariiformes Family: Diomedeidae

The albatrosses are among the largest of flying birds, and the great albatrosses from the genus Diomedea have the largest wingspans of any extant birds.

- Light-mantled albatross, Phoebetria palpebrata (A)
- Wandering albatross, Diomedea exulans

== Southern storm-petrels ==
Order: Procellariiformes Family: Oceanitidae

The southern storm-petrels are relatives of the petrels and are the smallest seabirds. They feed on planktonic crustaceans and small fish picked from the surface, typically while hovering. The flight is fluttering and sometimes bat-like.

- Black-bellied storm-petrel, Fregetta tropica (A)
- Polynesian storm-petrel, Nesofregetta fuliginosa

== Shearwaters and petrels ==
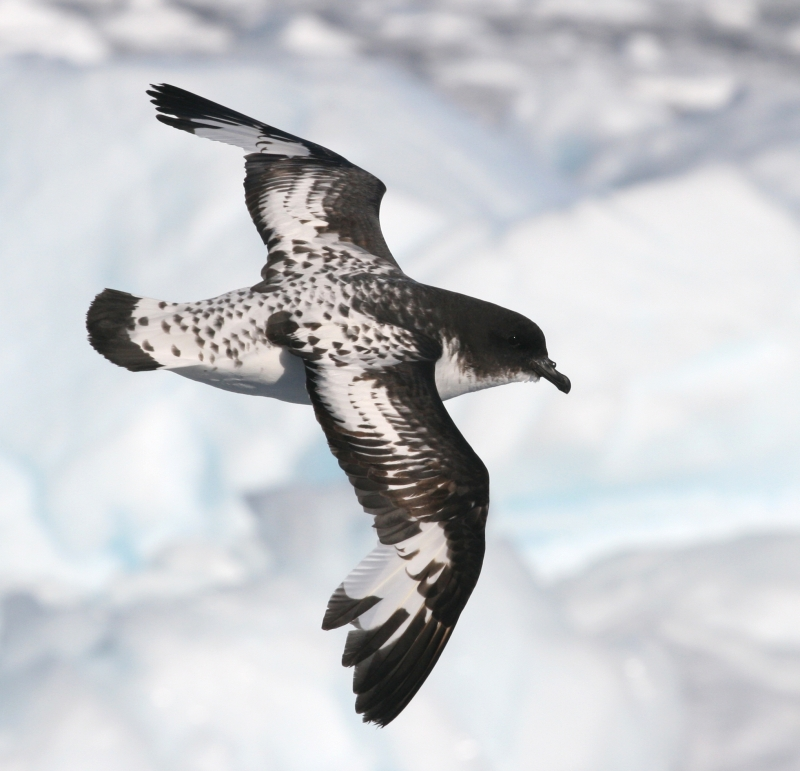
Cape petrel

Order: Procellariiformes Family: Procellariidae

The procellariids are the main group of medium-sized "true petrels", characterised by united nostrils with medium septum and a long outer functional primary.

- Southern giant-petrel, Macronectes giganteus (A)
- Cape petrel, Daption capense
- Gray-faced petrel, Pterodroma gouldi
- Kermadec petrel, Pterodroma neglecta
- Herald petrel, Pterodroma heraldica
- Mottled petrel, Pterodroma inexpectata
- White-necked petrel, Pterodroma cervicalis
- Black-winged petrel, Pterodroma nigripennis
- Cook's petrel, Pterodroma cookii (A)
- Gould's petrel, Pterodroma leucoptera (A)
- Collared petrel, Pterodroma brevipes (A)
- Stejneger's petrel, Pterodroma longirostris (A)
- Phoenix petrel, Pterodroma alba (A)
- Tahiti petrel, Pseudobulweria rostrata
- Wedge-tailed shearwater, Ardenna pacificus
- Buller's shearwater, Ardenna bulleri (A)
- Sooty shearwater, Ardenna griseus
- Short-tailed shearwater, Ardenna tenuirostris
- Christmas shearwater, Puffinus nativitatis (A)
- Tropical shearwater, Puffinus bailloni

== Frigatebirds ==
Order: Suliformes Family: Fregatidae

Frigatebirds are large seabirds usually found over tropical oceans. They are large, black-and-white or completely black, with long wings and deeply forked tails. The males have coloured inflatable throat pouches. They do not swim or walk and cannot take off from a flat surface. Having the largest wingspan-to-body-weight ratio of any bird, they are essentially aerial, able to stay aloft for more than a week.

- Lesser frigatebird, Fregata ariel
- Great frigatebird, Fregata minor

== Boobies and gannets ==
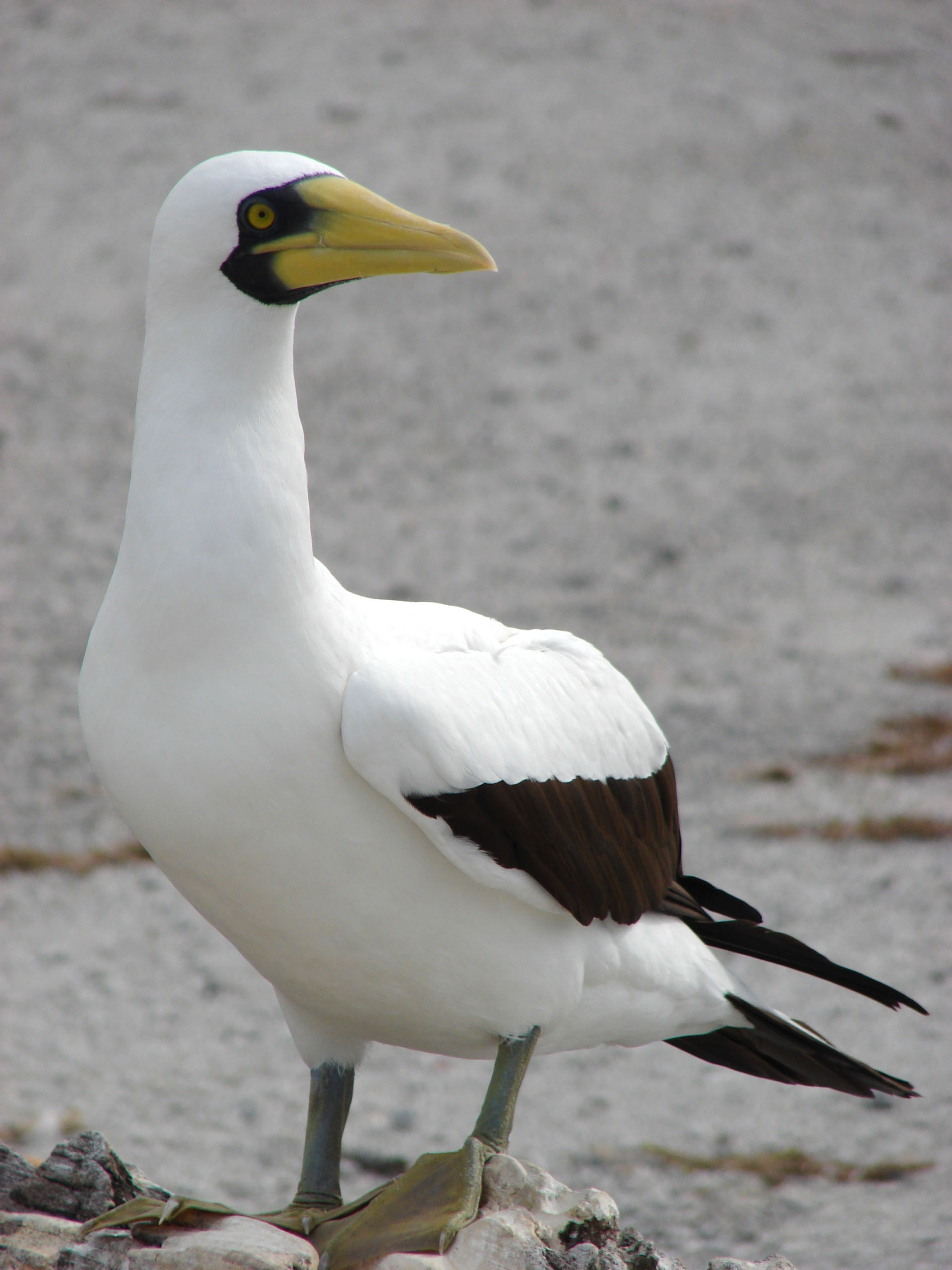
Masked booby

Order: Suliformes Family: Sulidae

The sulids comprise the gannets and boobies. Both groups are medium to large coastal seabirds that plunge-dive for fish.

- Masked booby, Sula dactylatra
- Brown booby, Sula leucogaster
- Red-footed booby, Sula sula

== Herons, egrets, and bitterns ==
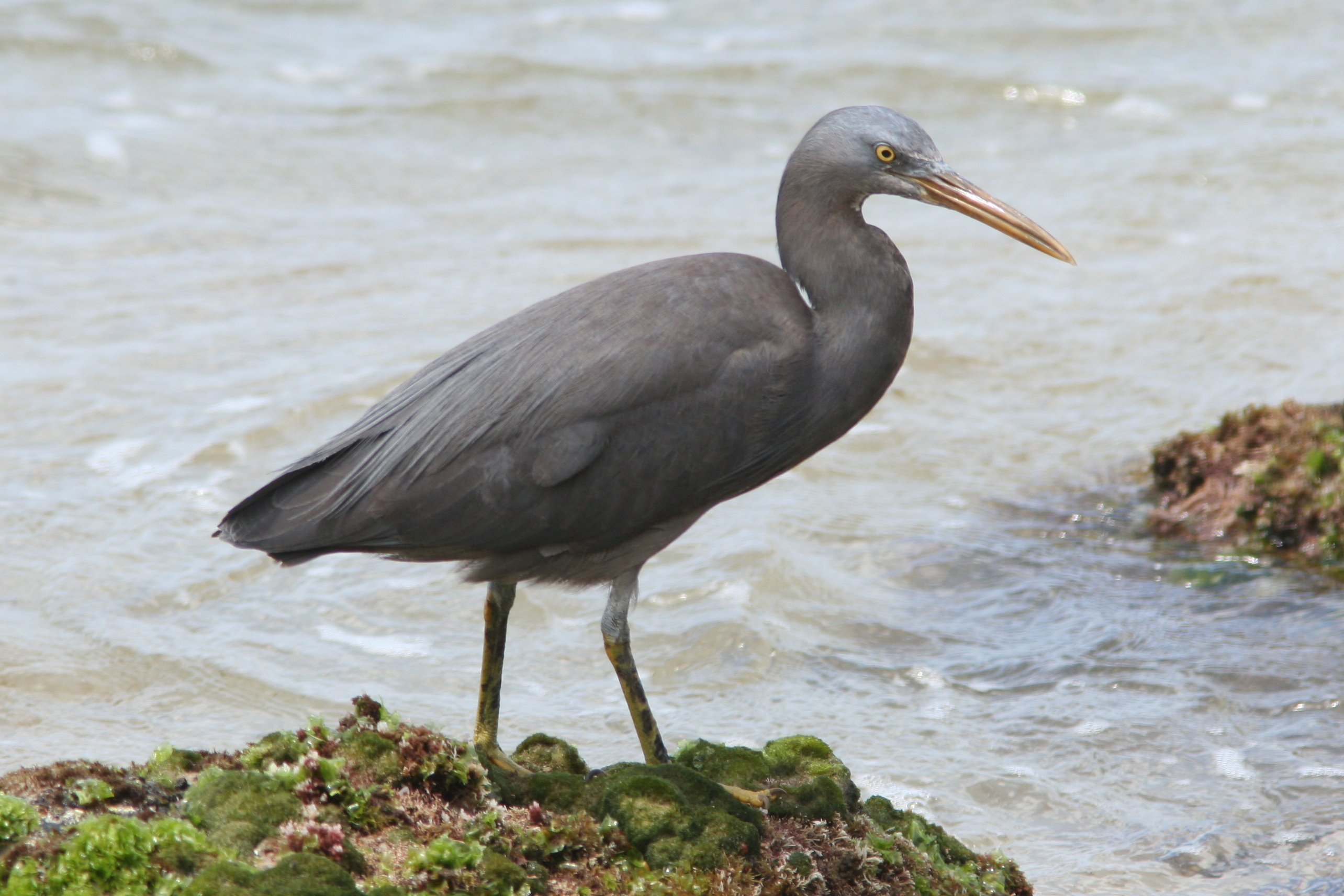
Pacific reef-egret

Order: Pelecaniformes Family: Ardeidae

The family Ardeidae contains the bitterns, herons, and egrets. Herons and egrets are medium to large wading birds with long necks and legs. Bitterns tend to be shorter necked and more wary. Members of Ardeidae fly with their necks retracted, unlike other long-necked birds such as storks, ibises and spoonbills.

- White-faced heron, Egretta novaehollandiae
- Pacific reef-heron, Egretta sacra
- Striated heron, Butorides striata (A)

== Hawks, eagles, and kites ==
Order: Accipitriformes Family: Accipitridae

Accipitridae is a family of birds of prey, which includes hawks, eagles, kites, harriers and Old World vultures. These birds have powerful hooked beaks for tearing flesh from their prey, strong legs, powerful talons and keen eyesight.

- Swamp harrier, Circus approximans

== Barn-owls ==
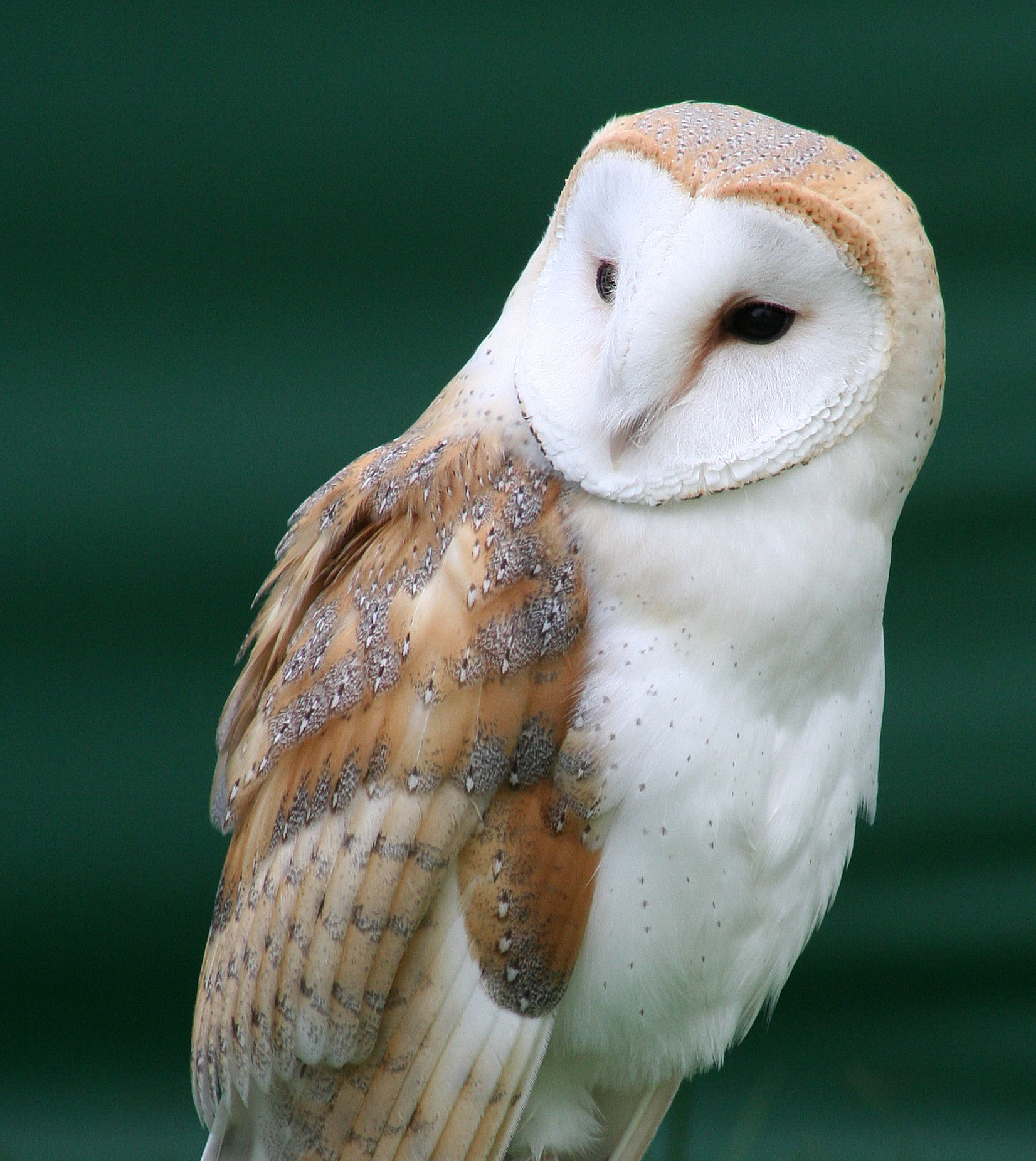
Barn owl

Order: Strigiformes Family: Tytonidae

Barn-owls are medium to large owls with large heads and characteristic heart-shaped faces. They have long strong legs with powerful talons.

- Eastern barn owl, Tyto javanica

== Kingfishers ==
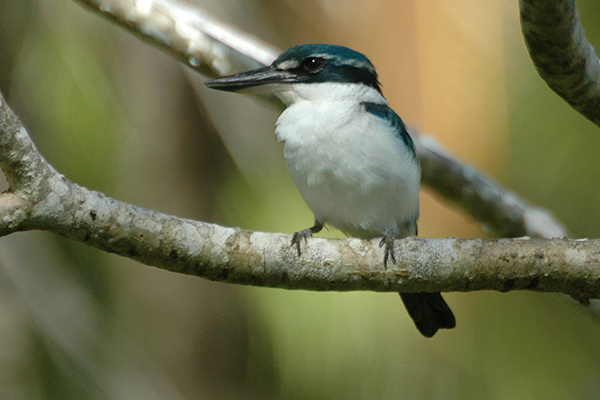
Pacific kingfisher

Order: Coraciiformes Family: Alcedinidae

Kingfishers are medium-sized birds with large heads, long, pointed bills, short legs and stubby tails.

- Pacific kingfisher, Todirhamphus sacer
- Collared kingfisher, Todirhamphus chloris

== Old World parrots ==
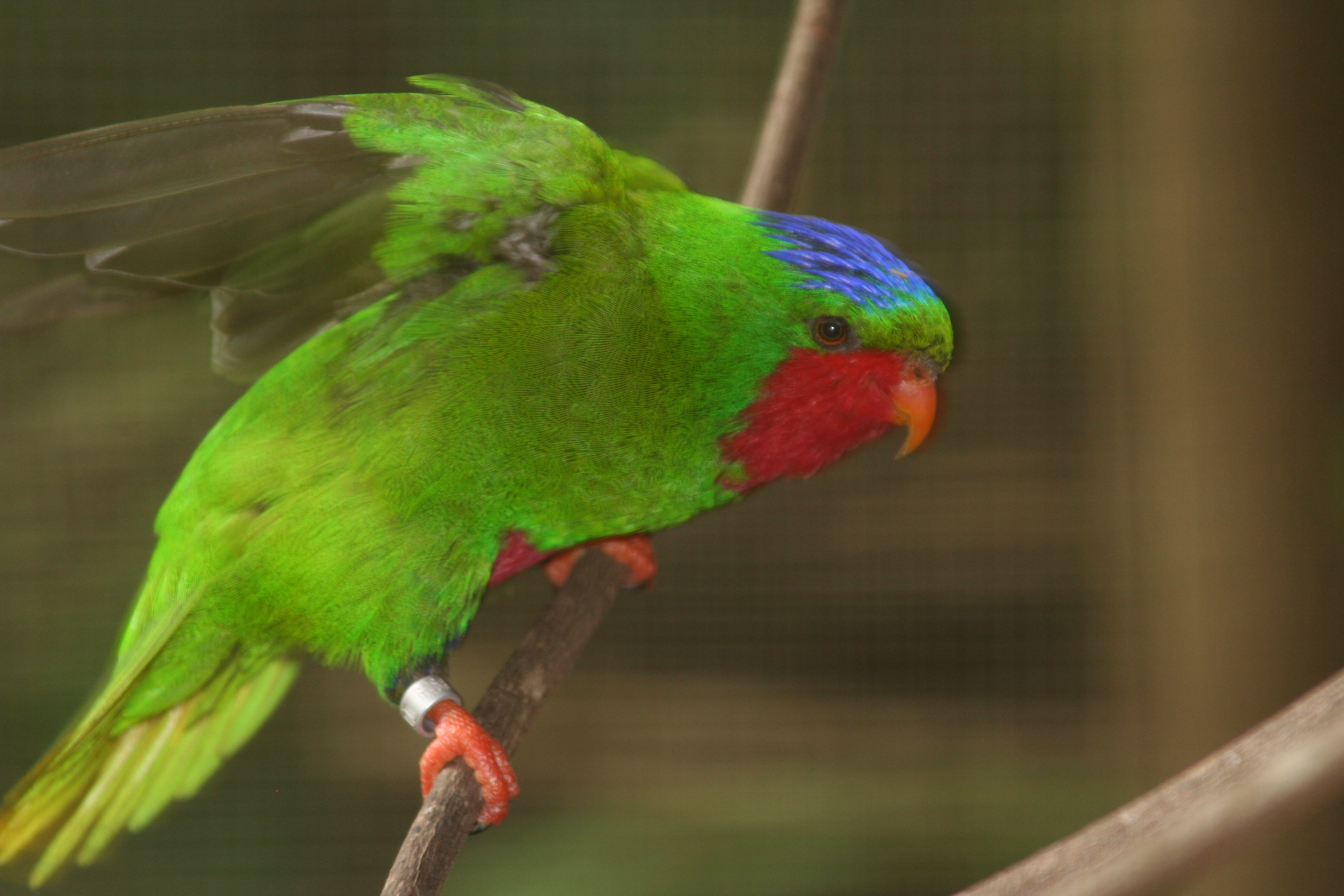
Blue-crowned lorikeet

Order: Psittaciformes Family: Psittaculidae

Characteristic features of parrots include a strong curved bill, an upright stance, strong legs, and clawed zygodactyl feet. Many parrots are vividly colored, and some are multi-colored. In size they range from 8 cm (3.1 in) to 1 m (3.3 ft) in length. Old World parrots are found from Africa east across south and southeast Asia and Oceania to Australia and New Zealand.

- Oceanic parrot, Eclectus infectus (Ex)
- Red shining-parrot, Prosopeia tabuensis (I)
- Blue-crowned lorikeet, Vini australis

== Honeyeaters ==
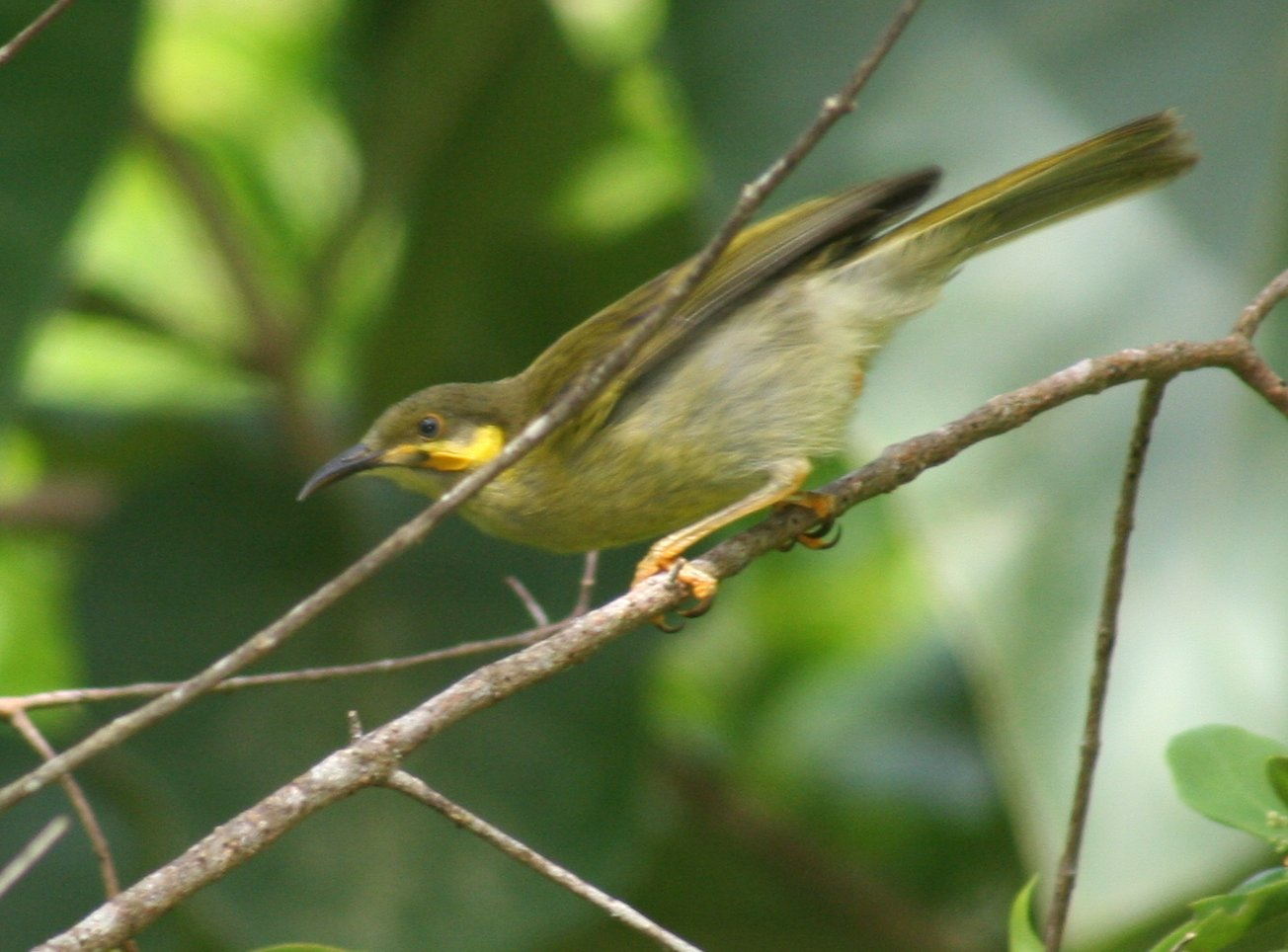
Wattled honeyeater

Order: Passeriformes Family: Meliphagidae

The honeyeaters are a large and diverse family of small to medium-sized birds most common in Australia and New Guinea. They are nectar feeders and closely resemble other nectar-feeding passerines.

- Wattled honeyeater, Foulehaio carunculata

== Cuckooshrikes ==
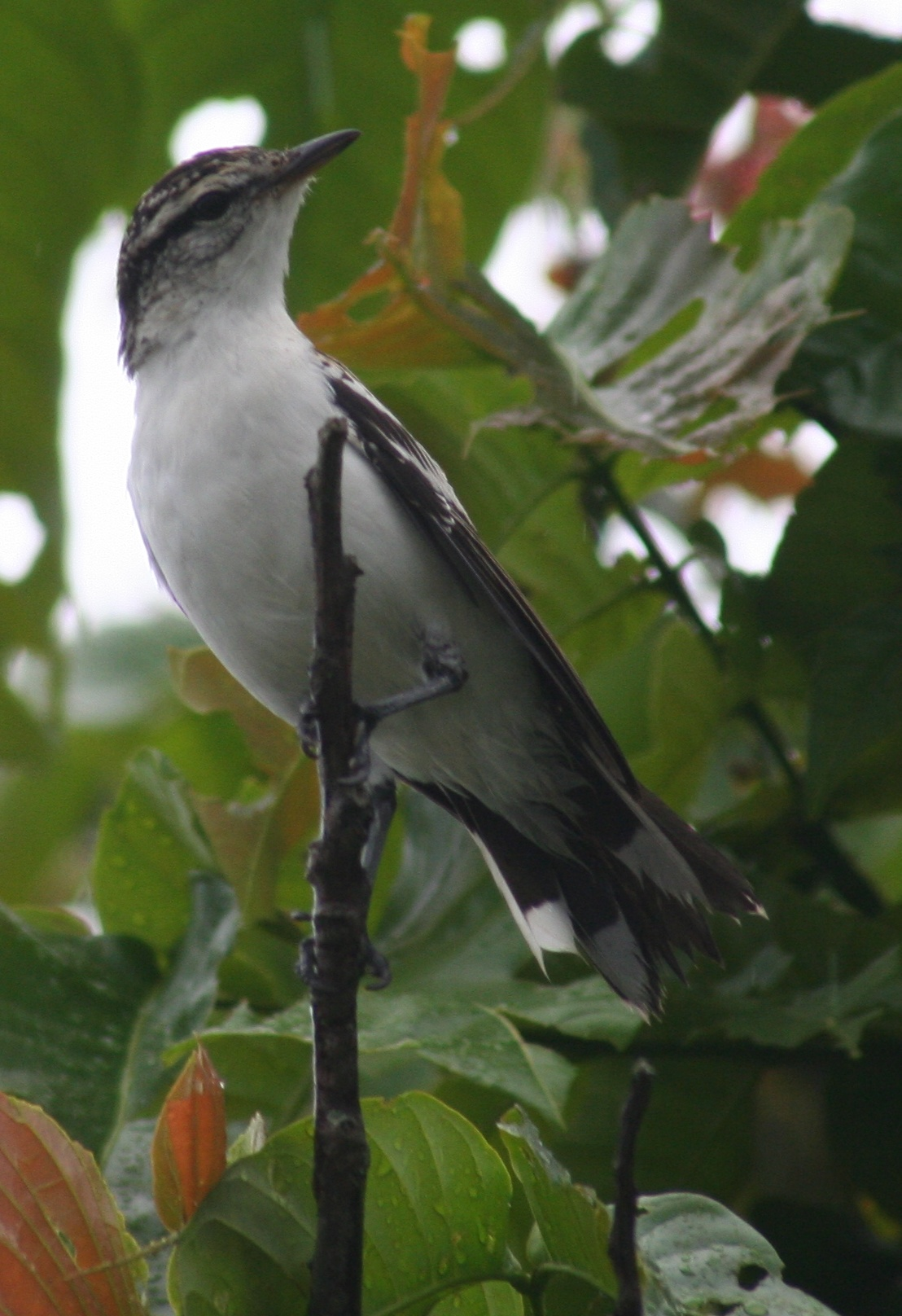
Polynesian triller

Order: Passeriformes Family: Campephagidae

The cuckooshrikes are small to medium-sized passerine birds. They are predominantly greyish with white and black, although some species are brightly coloured.

- Polynesian triller, Lalage maculosa

== Whistlers and allies ==
Order: Passeriformes Family: Pachycephalidae

The family Pachycephalidae includes the whistlers, shrikethrushes, and some of the pitohuis.

- Tongan whistler, Pachycephala jacquinoti (E)

== Monarch flycatchers ==
Order: Passeriformes Family: Monarchidae

The monarch flycatchers are small to medium-sized insectivorous passerines which hunt by flycatching.

- Fiji shrikebill, Clytorhynchus vitiensis

== Swallows ==
Order: Passeriformes Family: Hirundinidae

The family Hirundinidae is adapted to aerial feeding. They have a slender streamlined body, long pointed wings and a short bill with a wide gape. The feet are adapted to perching rather than walking, and the front toes are partially joined at the base.

- Pacific swallow, Hirundo tahitica

== Bulbuls ==
Order: Passeriformes Family: Pycnonotidae

Bulbuls are medium-sized songbirds. Some are colourful with yellow, red or orange vents, cheeks, throats or supercilia, but most are drab, with uniform olive-brown to black plumage. Some species have distinct crests.

- Red-vented bulbul, Pycnonotus cafer (I)

== Starlings ==
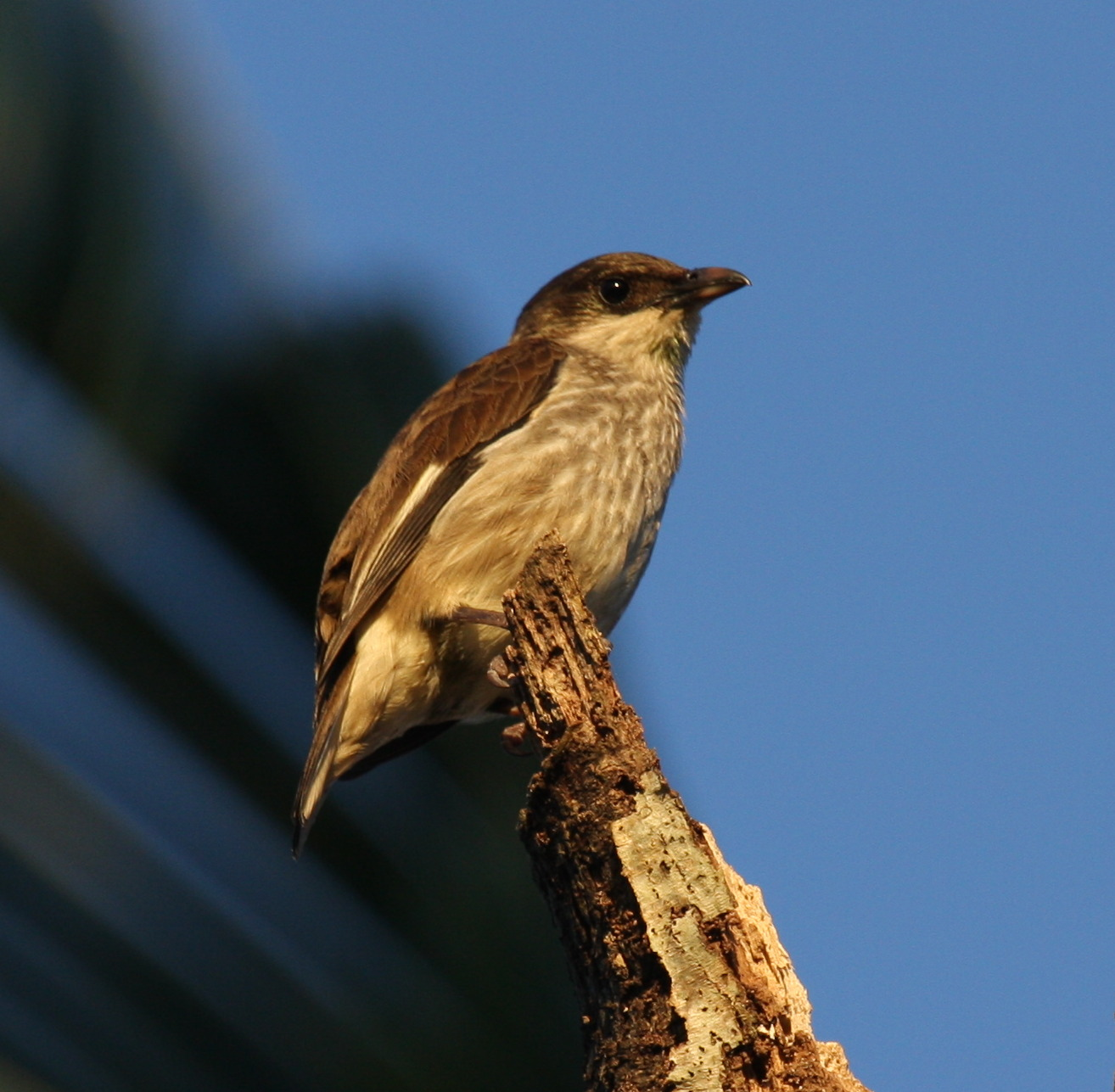
Polynesian starling

Order: Passeriformes Family: Sturnidae

Starlings are small to medium-sized passerine birds. Their flight is strong and direct and they are very gregarious. Their preferred habitat is fairly open country. They eat insects and fruit. Plumage is typically dark with a metallic sheen.

- Polynesian starling, Aplonis tabuensis
- European starling, Sturnus vulgaris (I)
- Common myna, Acridotheres tristis (A)
- Jungle myna, Acridotheres fuscus (I)

== See also ==
- List of birds
- Lists of birds by region
