= Military ranks of Tonga =

The military ranks of Tonga used by His Majesty's Armed Forces are similar to those used in other Commonwealth armed forces.

== Ceremonial ranks ==
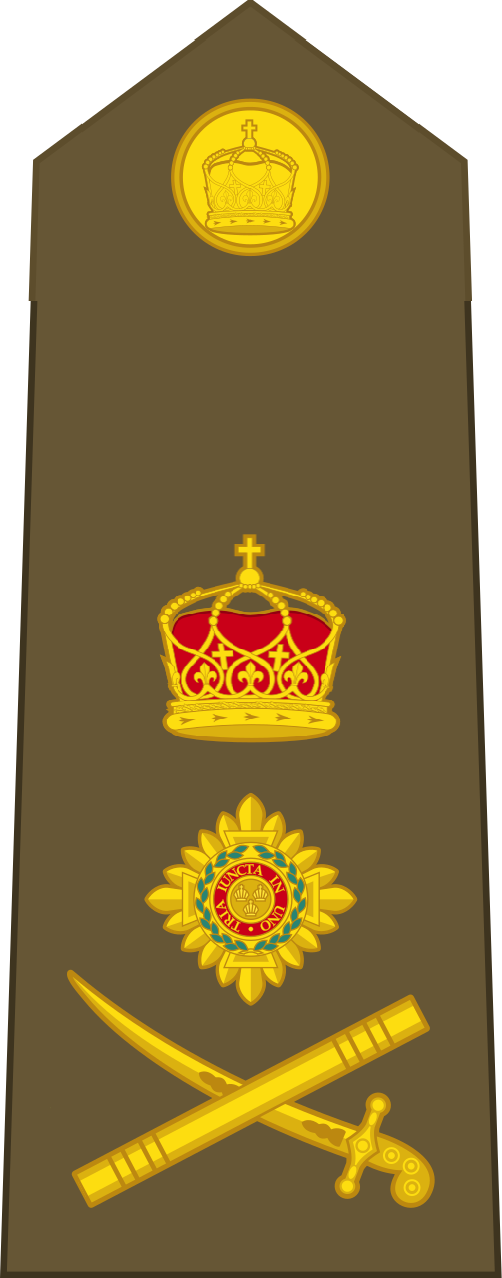
Rank group	Commander-in-chief
Tongan Land Force
Tongan Maritime Force
Name	Commander-in-chief
Tongan	Komanitā-pule

== Commissioned officer ranks ==
The rank insignia of commissioned officers.

Rank group	General / flag officers	Senior officers			Junior officers
Tongan Land Component
Tongan Land Component	Brigadier general	Colonel	Lieutenant colonel	Major	Captain	Lieutenant	Second lieutenant
Tongan Land Component	Pilikaria seniale	Kenolo	Lafitani kenolo	Mesia	Kapiteni	Lafitani	Lafitani ua
Tongan Navy
Tongan Navy	Commodore	Captain	Commander	Lieutenant commander	Lieutenant	Sub lieutenant	Midshipman
Rank group	General / flag officers	Senior officers			Junior officers

== Other ranks ==
The rank insignia of non-commissioned officers and enlisted personnel.

Rank group	Senior NCOs				Junior NCOs		Enlisted
Tongan Land Component							No insignia
Tongan Land Component	Warrant officer class 1	Warrant officer class 2	Staff sergeant	Sergeant	Corporal	Lance corporal	Private (or equivalent)
Tongan Land Component	'Ofisa Fakamafai Kalasi 1	'Ofisa Fakamafai Kalasi 2	Sitafu satini	Satini	Kopila	Lani kopila	Palaiveti
Tongan Navy							No insignia
Tongan Navy	Warrant officer class 1	Warrant officer class 2	Staff sergeant	Sergeant	Corporal	Lance corporal	Private
Tongan Navy	'Ofisa Fakamafai Kalasi 1	'Ofisa Fakamafai Kalasi 2	Sitafu satini	Satini	Kopila	Lani kopila	Palaiveti
