= Tongan Land Force =

- Country: Tonga
- Part of: His Majesty's Armed Forces of Tonga
- Headquarters: Taliai Military Camp, Tongatapu

Commanders
- Current commander: Lt Col Sione Mapakaitolo

The Tongan Land Force is the main land-based component of the His Majesty's Armed Forces of Tonga (HMAF). It is responsible for ground defence operations and includes various specialized units.

== Headquarters ==
The Tongan Land Force is headquartered at the Taliai Military Camp on the island of Tongatapu, where it coordinates its operations and training activities.

== Components ==
The Tongan Land Force comprises several key units, each with distinct roles.

=== Tongan Royal Guards ===
The Tongan Royal Guards are tasked with the security of the monarchy and participate in ceremonial events. They also maintain the Tonga Royal Corps of Musicians, which performs at state and military functions.

=== Royal Tongan Marines ===
The Royal Tongan Marines serve as the primary light infantry force of the HMAF. They are trained in amphibious warfare and play a crucial role in national defence and international peacekeeping missions.

=== Joint Logistics and Technical Support Unit ===
This unit provides logistical and technical support necessary for the operations of His Majesty's Armed Forces.

- Repair and Maintenance Workshop
- Supply Store
- Transport
- Construction Engineers
- HMAF Band
