= His Majesty's Armed Forces (Tonga) =

Military of Tonga

- Coat of arms of His Majesty's Armed Forces

- Flag of the Armed Forces
- Motto: Terra Marique (Latin) ("Land and Sea")
- Founded: 1939
- Current form: 2013
- Service branches: Land Force; Maritime Force; Air Wing
- Headquarters: Vilai Barracks, Nuku'alofa

Leadership
- Commander-in-Chief: HM King Tupou VI
- Minister for HMAF: Tupoutoʻa ʻUlukalala
- Chief of Defense Staff: Brigadier General Lord Fielakepa

Personnel
- Military age: 18
- Conscription: None
- Active personnel: 750

Expenditure
- Percent of GDP: 0.9% GDP (2006 est.)

Industry
- Foreign suppliers: Austria; Australia; Israel; Serbia; United States

Related articles
- Ranks: Military ranks of Tonga

His Majesty's Armed Forces (HMAF) is the military of Tonga. It is composed of three operational components and two support elements (logistics and training). The mission of HMAF is to "Defend the sovereignty of the Kingdom of Tonga".

The HMAF is partially supported by defence co-operation agreements with Australia, the United States, New Zealand, India, and Fiji. The co-operation aims to train HMAF personnel in leadership, academics, and trades. Support for infrastructure development is another part of the security co-operation.

Since 2001, members of HMAF have supported the coalition of the willing in Operation Iraqi Freedom, the International Security Assistance Force in Afghanistan, and the Regional Assistance Mission to Solomon Islands.

== History ==
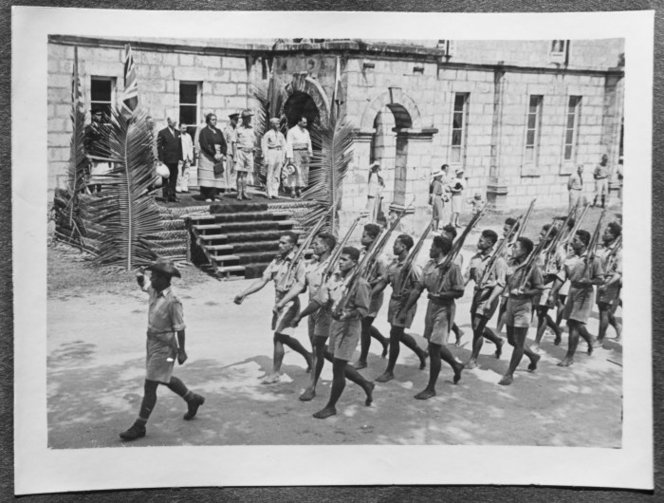
TDF during the Italian capitulation parade

The military history of Tonga extends from before European contact to the present day, with Tonga participating in World War I, World War II, and the Afghan war, among other conflicts.

== Components ==
The main elements of His Majesty's Armed Forces are:

- Joint Force HQ
- Tongan Land Force
  - Tongan Royal Guards
  - Royal Tongan Marines
- Tongan Maritime Force
- Tongan Air Wing
- Joint Logistics and Technical Support Unit
- Services Training School
- Territorial Force

=== Tongan Royal Guards ===
The Tongan Royal Guards are a company-sized infantry unit, which was established in 1860 under the reign of King George Tupou I. The Royal Guard provides security for the Tongan monarch, palaces, and members of the royal family. The unit also participates in ceremonial duties, along with the Tonga Royal Corps of Musicians, which serves as a military band for different occasions.

=== Royal Tongan Marines ===
The Royal Tongan Marine Infantry is organized as a company-sized group, with a headquarters and three infantry platoons, and is based at Fua'amotu.

=== Tongan Maritime Force ===
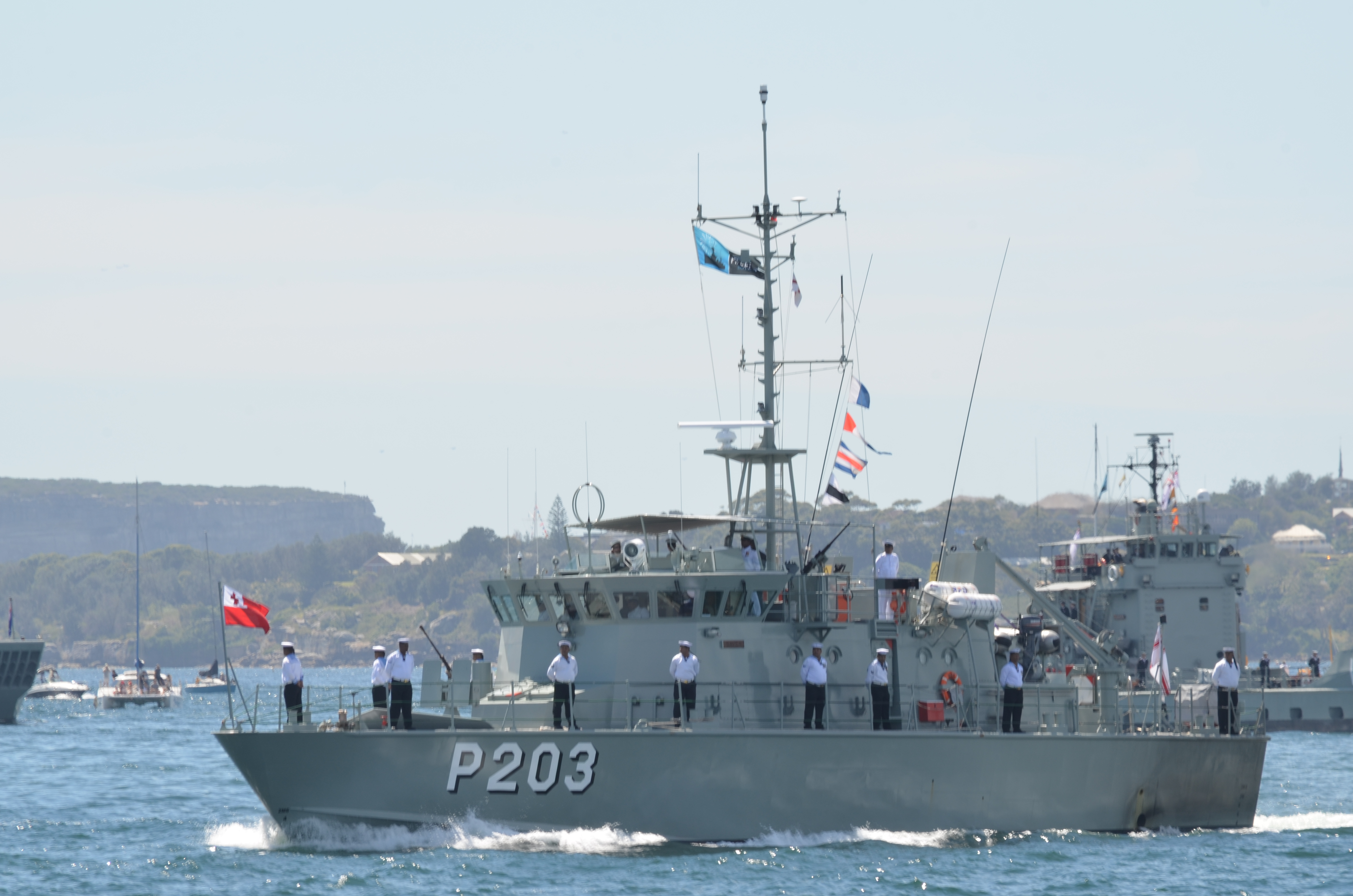
The Tongan patrol boat VOEA Savea (P203) in Sydney Harbour, 2013

The Maritime Force is equipped with two Guardian-class patrol boats, provided by Australia under the Pacific Maritime Security Program, a Landing Craft, and a motor boat serving as the royal yacht. The Tongan Maritime Force performs patrol missions, and occasionally deals with border violations at the Minerva Reef and in Tonga's restricted fishing zones.

=== Tongan Air Wing ===
On 4 May 1996 the Air Wing was created, and a Beech 18 was taken into service. In 1999 a Citabria was obtained to help with training of the Beech 18.

=== Territorial Force ===
Territorial Force is a component of HMAF alongside the Regular Force and active reserve. Its duties are outlined in the HMAF Act 1992 and HMAF Regulations 1994. The primary mission of the Territorial Force is to maintain internal order and provide support to civil authorities, including humanitarian assistance and disaster relief.

== International Defence Organisations ==
The HMAF is a member of the following international defence organisations:

- Pacific Armies Management Seminar
- Pacific Area Senior Officers Logistics Seminar
- Western Pacific Naval Symposium
- International Hydrographic Organization
- South Pacific Hydrographic Commission
- NATO Codification, where though Pacific Codification System, Tonga and Fiji are sponsored by Australia

Tonga has an agreement to share "disaster response knowledge" with the United States Nevada National Guard.

== Ranks ==
The ranks used by His Majesty's Armed Forces are similar to those used in other Commonwealth armed forces.

== Commanders ==
Until 2013, commanders were called Commander of the Tongan Defence Services. After 2013, they are now called Chief of the Defence Staff of the HMAF.

== Equipment ==
=== Small arms ===
Model	Image	Origin	Type	Calibre	Number	Notes
Handguns
Glock 17		AUT	Pistol	9×19mm Parabellum		Standard Pistol of HMAF
Submachine guns
Uzi		ISR	Sub-machine gun	9×19mm Parabellum		Donated by Israel in 1988. Used by Tongan Royal Guard and Tongan Maritime Force
Assault rifles
IMI Galil		ISR	Assault rifle	5.56×45mm		Donated by Israel in 1988. Version with all Plastic furniture and minus bipod fixture
M4A1		USA	Carbine rifle	5.56×45mm		Standard service rifle of HMAF
Grenade Launcher Attachment
M203 grenade launcher		USA	Grenade launcher	40 mm grenade	20	Used by Tongan Land Force
Sniper Rifle
M24 Sniper Weapon System		USA	Intermediate range sniper rifle.	7.62×51mm NATO	10	Standard sniper rifle of HMAF
Machine guns
M249		USA	Squad automatic weapon	5.56×45mm NATO	20	Used by Tongan Land Force
M2 Browning		USA	Heavy machine gun	12.7x99mm NATO	6	Used by Tongan Maritime Force on Guardian-class patrol boat
Zastava M55		Serbia/Tonga	20mm Cannon with Local Pattern Mount for Patrol Boat use	20 x 110mm Hispano	2 x Triple Barrel	Purchased by Tongan Government in 1990, Used by Tongan Maritime Force for adaptation as required to Patrol Boats.

=== Vehicles ===
Model	Image	Origin	Type	Number	Notes
Wheeled vehicles
Unimog U1700		Australia	Military truck	5	Five donated by Australia in 2018.
