= Telecommunications in Tonga =

Telecommunications in Tonga include radio, television, telephones, and the Internet.

== Telephone ==
Main lines in use: 11,000 (2021)

Telephones - mobile cellular: 64,000 (2021)

Telephone system:

Fixed PSTN, GSM 900

Main Island has 4G mobile.

domestic: NA
international: satellite earth station - 2 Intelsat (Pacific Ocean))

== Radio ==
Broadcast stations: AM 1 (2005), FM 5 (2005), shortwave 1 (1998)

Radios: 61,000 (1997)

== Television ==
Broadcast stations: 4 (2005)

Televisions: 2,000 (1997)

In April 2002 the Tongasat company started its own satellite telecommunication service when it obtained the Esiafi 1 (former private American Comstar D4) satellite (launched in 1981) that was moved to Tonga's own geostationary point.

== Internet ==
Internet service providers (ISPs): 2 (2005)

Country code (Top level domain): .to

Broadband internet communication is provided by the Tonga Cable System that went online in April 2018.

On 15 January 2022, following a volcanic eruption on the island of Hunga Tonga–Hunga Haʻapai, the Tonga Cable System was severed, leaving the country without Internet access. Using a satellite dish at the University of the South Pacific, the telecommunications company Digicel provided limited 2G coverage to the island of Tongatapu, as well as giving residents free SIM cards.
