= Agriculture in Tonga =

Food production in a country of Oceania

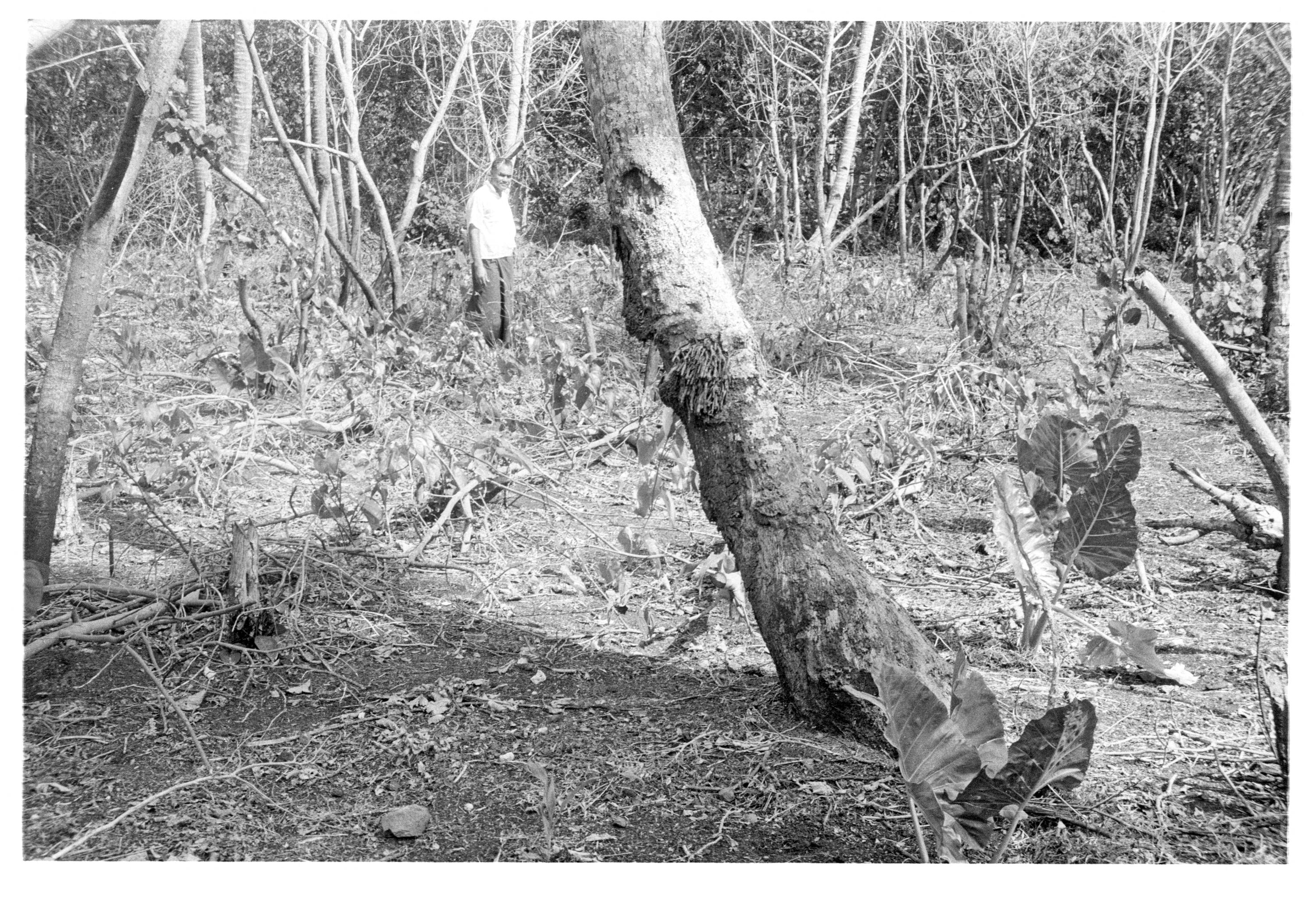
First Niuatoputapu Agricultural Farm at 'Ahofakataha - experimental yam garden

Agriculture in Tonga is largely based on the farming of yams, squash, and root crops. Agriculture consists of 16–29.9% of Tonga's GDP, 34% of its labour force, and about 50% of its exports. Since the 1980s, Tonga's agricultural exports expanded to include vanilla, watermelons, sugar, and legumes.

With the expansion of the archipelago's population, climate change, and competitive markets, Tonga has trouble keeping up with competitive demand.

== History ==
=== Traditional farming ===
In the past, Tonga had a subsistence based system of agriculture called shifting cultivation and fallowing, which eventually evolved to create a tax system that paid nobles and the monarchy in yams. Yams were considered the "'noblest crop'", and were farmed primarily for the monarchs and nobility as well as the annual common feast of Inasi. Before British and European influence in Tonga, there were no markets.

The Tongan calendar was based on the lunar cycle and the rotation of crops (the Tongan words for "year" and "crop of yams" are the same, ta'u), causing there to be 13 months in a year, approximately starting on November 6, and ending sometime between late October and early November.

In shifting cultivation and fallowing, one plot of vegetated land would undergo slashing and burning, be cultivated and have crops planted, and then be left fallow for two to four years. The cycle begins with yams, alocasia, and plantains- which are left to grow from eight to nine months to two to three years before they are harvested and have the next crops planted in their place. For the next four to six months come the sweet potatoes, which are then succeeded by xanthosoma for ten to twelve months, which is finally replaced by the hardy cassava plant for a year.

=== Modern farming ===
Following European influence, subsistence farming has been replaced by what is called "semi-permanent", or commercial farming.

Although Tonga lacks connectivity between its islands and advanced agricultural technologies, it retains its status as a prominent producer of crops for East Asian and Oceanian countries. Today, Tonga produces 60% of New Zealand's watermelon imports, and has been producing squash for Japan and South Korea since the mid-1980s, although overproduction of the crop has greatly reduced its value and thus the amount of squash produced.
