= Maama Mai Solar Farm =

Photovoltaic power plant in Nukuʻalofa, Tonga

- Country: Tonga
- Location: Nukuʻalofa
- Coordinates: 21°09′28.2″S 175°10′49.6″W
- Status: Operational
- Construction began: 2011
- Commission date: July 2012
- Construction cost: NZD $7.9 million

Power generation
- Nameplate capacity: 1.325 MW
- Annual net output: 1,880 MWh

The Maama Mai Solar Farm is a photovoltaic power plant in Nukuʻalofa, Tonga. It was the first renewable power plant in the country. The plant has an output of 1.325MW and produces 1,880 MWh of electricity per annum. The plant's name is Tongan for "let there be light".

== History ==
Funding for the plant was announced by New Zealand foreign affairs minister Murray McCully in July 2010. The plant was to be built and operated by Meridian Energy, with the electricity sold to Tonga Power. Funding of NZ$7.9 million was provided by the New Zealand Agency for International Development.

Construction of the power plant started in 2011 and completed in 2012. It was then commissioned by King Tupou VI in July 2012, making it the first renewable power plant in the country. In 2017, the power plant ownership was fully transferred to Tonga Power.

== See also ==
- Economy of Tonga
