= Tupou Tongapoʻuli Aleamotuʻa =

Tongan soldier and noble

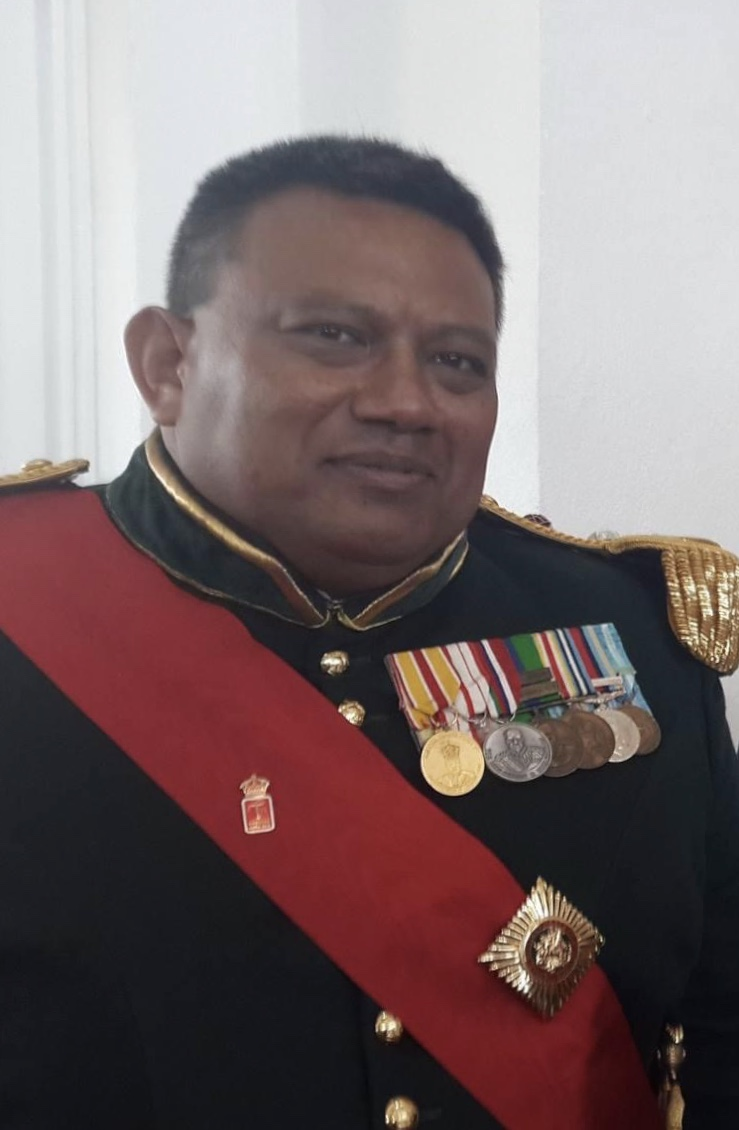
Tupou Tongapoʻuli Aleamotuʻa in 2015

Brigadier General Tupou Tongapoʻuli Aleamotuʻa (born 1966), also known as Lord Fielakepa, is a Tongan noble and former soldier. He served as Chief of Staff of His Majesty's Armed Forces from December 2014 to October 2026. From April 2021 to May 2022 he served as Acting Commissioner for the Tongan Police.

Fielakepa joined the Tongan Army in December 1986 as an officer cadet. He was a platoon commander in Tonga's Royal Guard from 1988 to 1991 before being seconded to the diplomatic services as a Military Liaison Officer. He was aide de camp to King Tāufaʻāhau Tupou IV from 1995 to 1998, and chief logistics officer of the armed forces from 1998 to 2002. In 2004 he was promoted to Commander of Land Forces. From October 2011 to May 2012 he commanded Tonga's third contingent to Afghanistan and was stationed at Camp Bastion. In 2014 he was appointed Chief of Defence Staff.

In 2015 Aleamotuʻa was appointed to the title of Lord Fielakepa by King Tupou VI in 2015 following the death of his older brother of Sosaia Tupou Aleamotuʻa. The appointment was challenged by his nephew Tupou Tongaliuaki Filoʻaulo Aleamotuʻa, and in December 2015 the Land Court ruled in the latter's favour. The decision was upheld by the Privy Council of Tonga in August 2016.

Lord Fielakepa is a member of the Privy Council of Tonga since January 2015.

The US National Defence University has admitted Brigadier Fielakepa to the university's Internation Hall of Fame.

On 1 August 2024, Lord Fielakepa was appointed an Honorary Officer of the Order of Australia for distinguished leadership of His Majesty's Armed Forces of Tonga and fostering its relationship with the Australian Defence Force.

On 21 October 2026 Fielakepa retired from the armed forces.
