= Neiafu (Vavaʻu) =

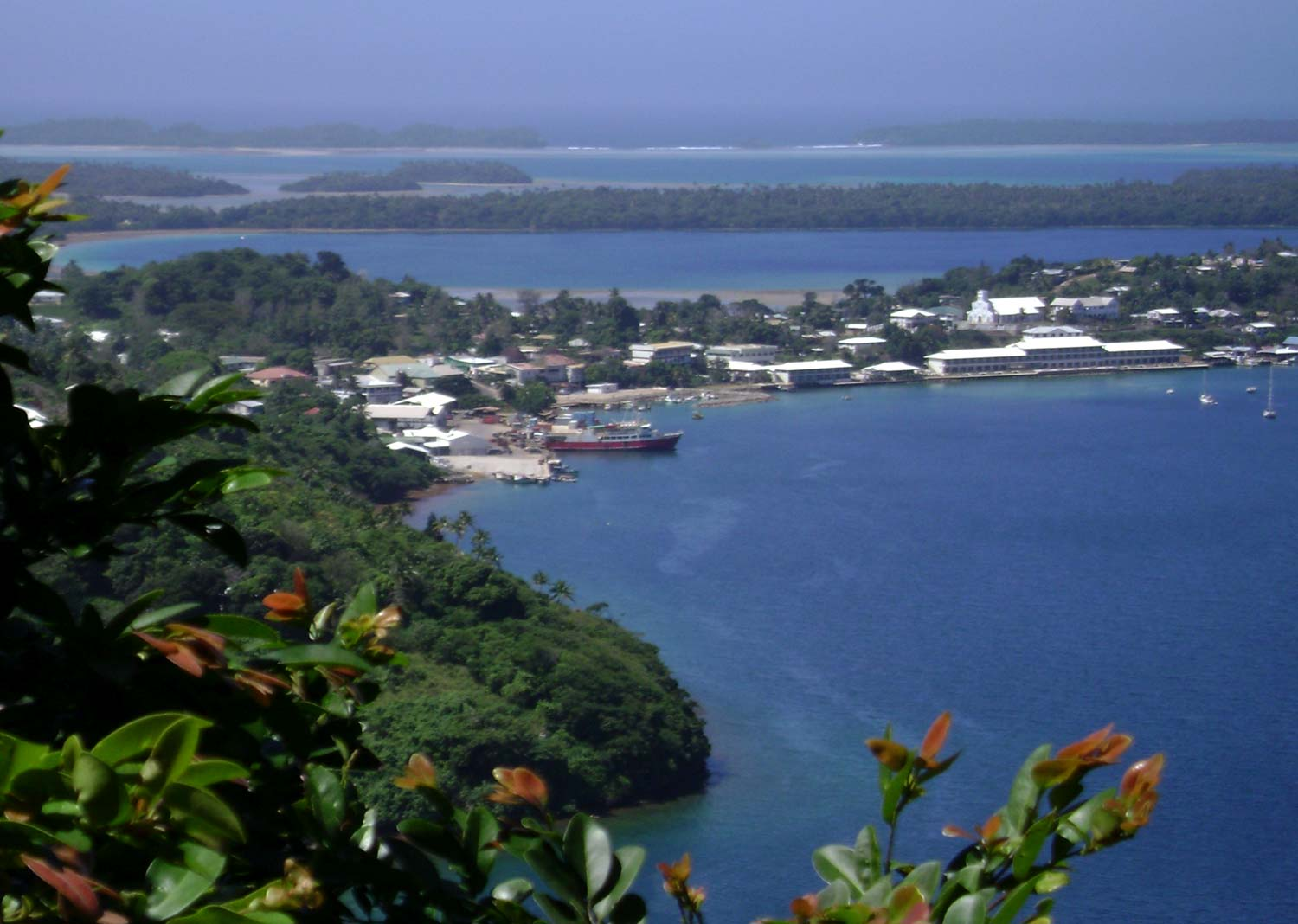
- Port of Refuge viewed from Mt. Talau

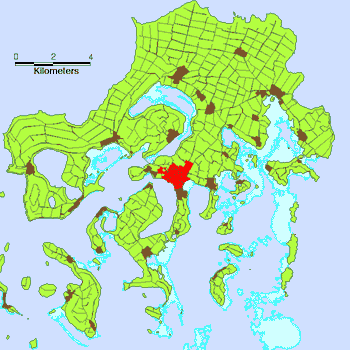
- Location of Neiafu on Vavaʻu Island

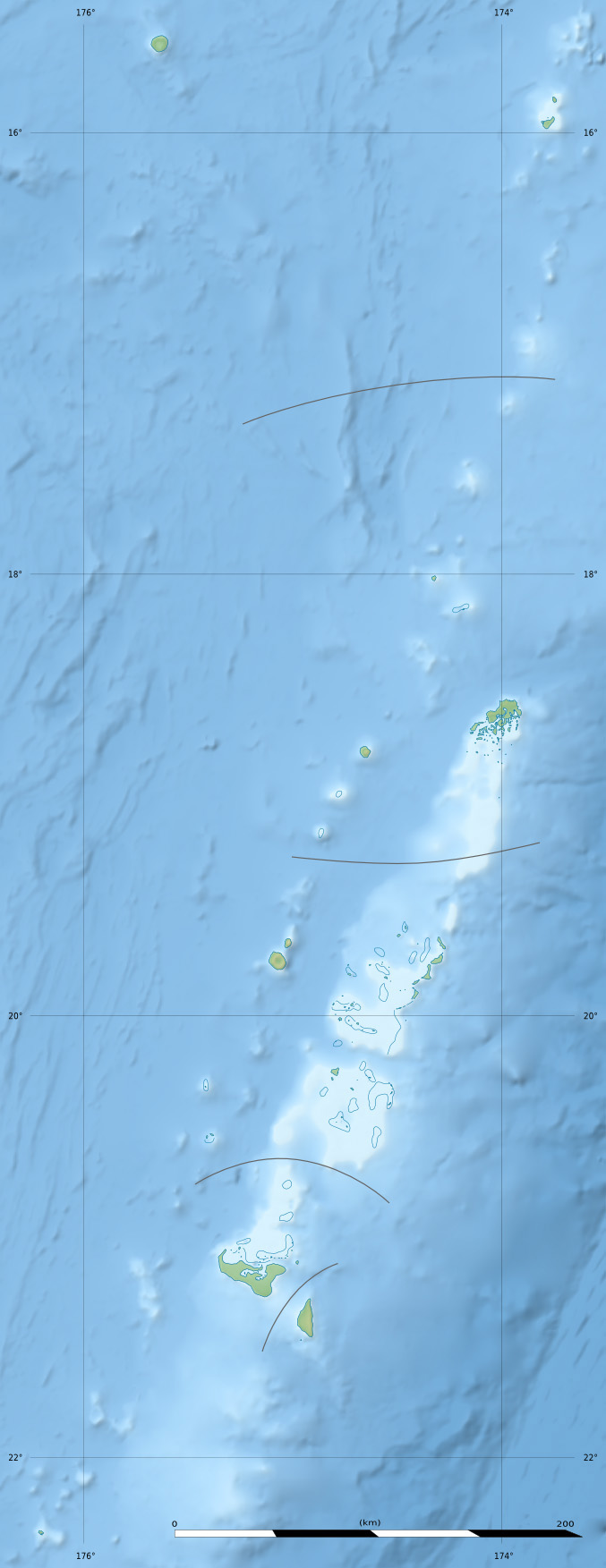
- Location within Tonga
- Coordinates: 18°39′03″S 173°58′59″W
- Country: Tonga
- Island: Vavaʻu

Population (2021)
  - Total: 3,845
- Time zone: UTC+13 (–)
- Climate: Af

Neiafu is the second-largest town in Tonga with a population of 3,845 in 2021. It is situated beside the Port of Refuge, a deep-water harbour on the south coast of Vavaʻu, the main island of the Vavaʻu archipelago in northern Tonga. To the north-west lies the 131-metre high (430 ft) Mt. Talau with its distinctive flat top.

Neiafu is the administrative centre of the Vavaʻu group and has government offices, banks, schools, a police station and a hospital. It is also an important centre for tourism with many yachts anchoring in the Port of Refuge.

In the late 19th century Neiafu was the location of a German coaling-station, established under the country's 1876 Treaty of Friendship with Tonga. The base was transferred to Britain in 1900 with the establishment of a British protectorate.

The town is powered by a 300kW solar PV farm with battery backup in the hamlet of Kāmeli.
