= List of maritime disasters in the 21st century =

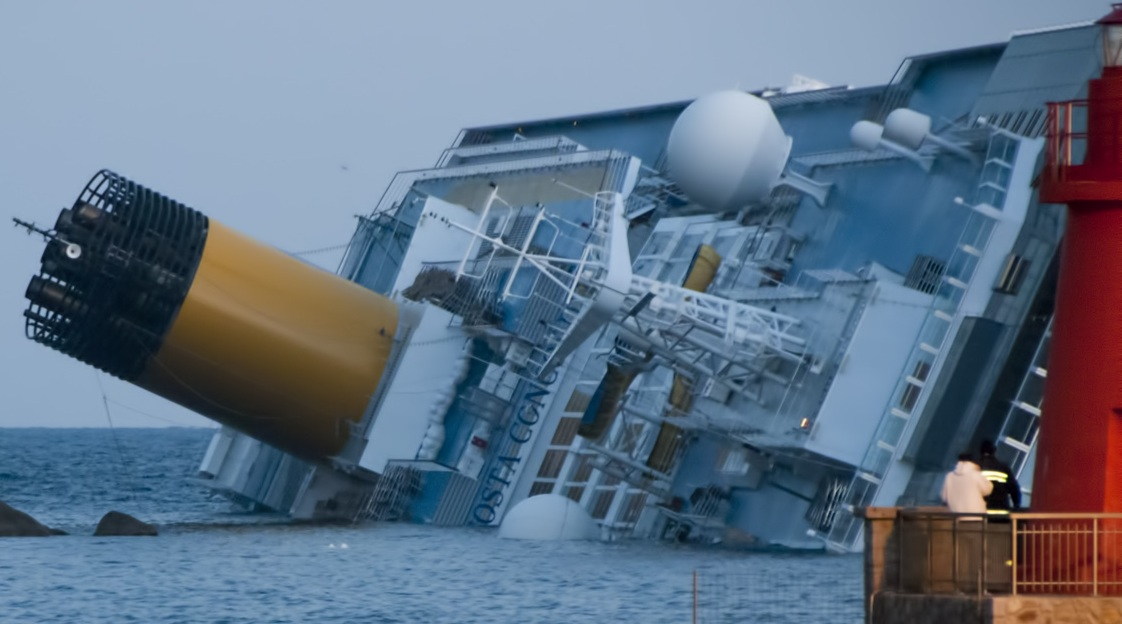
Costa Concordia aground off the Isola del Giglio.

A maritime disaster is an accident involving vessels at sea which causes significant damage, injury or loss of life. This list covers significant maritime disasters of the 21st century.

== Peacetime disasters ==
All ships are vulnerable to bad weather, faulty design or human error. Some of these disasters occurred during conflict, although the losses were unrelated to military action. The table listings are in decreasing order of the magnitude of casualties.

Year	Country	Description	Deaths	Image
2002	Senegal	Le Joola – On 26 September, the overloaded ferry capsized in rough seas with an estimated death toll of 1,864. There were only 64 survivors. The majority of passengers were Senegalese, including 854 to 923 Senegalese-French nationals on board.	1,864	
2011	Tanzania	Spice Islander I, a passenger ferry carrying at least 800 people, sank off the coast of Zanzibar on 10 September. At least 200 people have been confirmed dead.	250–1,573	
2015	Libya	Mediterranean Sea migrant shipwreck of 18 April 2015 – A 25 m (82 ft) vessel, carrying migrants and refugees bound for Europe, foundered in Libyan waters south of the Italian island of Lampedusa. The vessel reportedly capsized after its occupants rushed to draw the attention of a passing merchant ship. Initial estimates put the death toll at 800. However, further examination after the vessel was raised led to a revised estimate of 1,050–1,100. Many drowned whilst locked below deck, while 28 survivors were rescued by the Italian Coast Guard and the Maltese Navy.	1,050–1,100	
2006	Egypt	Al-Salam Boccaccio 98 – On 3 February, the roll-on/roll-off passenger ferry sank in the Red Sea en route from Duba, Saudi Arabia, to Safaga in southern Egypt. The ship was carrying 1,312 passengers and 96 crew. Of the total 1,408 on board, only 388 people survived.	1,020	
2008	Philippines	Princess of the Stars – On 21 June, the ferry capsized and sank in Typhoon Fengshen, off the coast of San Fernando, Romblon. Of the estimated 870 people aboard, only 56 survived.	814	
2003	Bangladesh	Nazreen-1 – On 8 July, the passenger ferry sank in the Meghna River. Of 750 people aboard, 220 were rescued.	530	
2015	China	Dongfang zhi Xing – On 1 June the river cruise ship capsized on an overnight voyage after being hit by a waterspout during severe weather while in the Damazhou waterway section of the Yangtze River.	442	
2002	Bangladesh	Salahuddin-2 – On the night of 3 May, the ferry sank in the Meghna River south of Dhaka, killing more than 450 people.	450	
2006	Indonesia	Senopati Nusantara – The ferry sank in a storm on 30 December. She was a scheduled passenger liner from Kumai in Central Kalimantan to Tanjung Emas port in Semarang, Central Java. About 22 nautical miles (40 km) off Mandalika island, she sank in a fierce storm in the Java Sea. At least 400–500 people are thought to have died; 224 were rescued.	400–500	
2015	Libya	Mediterranean Sea migrant shipwreck of 13 April 2015 – A vessel carrying migrants and refugees bound for Europe sank 24 hours after leaving the Libyan coast, possibly after the passengers capsized the boat trying to get the attention of an Italian rescue team. An estimated 400 people drowned, while at least 144 survivors were rescued by the Italian Coast Guard.	400	
2013	Libya	Mediterranean Sea migrant shipwreck of 3 October 2013 – An unnamed vessel carrying about 500 African migrants, primarily from Eritrea, Somalia, and Ghana, caught fire off the coast of Lampedusa, Italy, when the passengers lit blankets on fire to signal their proximity to land. Of the passengers and crew, 155 were rescued, with 359 confirmed dead by 12 October.	359	
2001	Indonesia	SIEV X – A boat carrying more than 400 asylum seekers to Australia sank on 19 October. 353 people were lost. The Australian government was criticized for not doing anything to help the survivors for three days.	353	
2014	South Korea	Sewol – The ferry capsized on 16 April. It was carrying 476 people, mostly secondary school students from Ansan's Danwon High School who were travelling from Incheon to Jeju.	304	
2014	Uganda	Lake Albert boat disaster – On 22 March, a boat carrying Congolese refugees capsized in Lake Albert, killing 251 people.	251	
2009	Indonesia	Teratai Prima – On 11 January, the ferry sank in the Makassar Strait off West Sulawesi due to stormy weather with 250 deaths.	250	
2018	Tanzania	MV Nyerere, a ferry believed to be carrying over 400 passengers, capsized in lake Victoria on September 20. 228 people died, while 41 were rescued.	228	
2009	Libya	Mediterranean Sea migrant shipwreck of 27 March 2009 – An unnamed fishing vessel, carrying migrants and refugees bound for Europe and described as unseaworthy, capsized off the coast of Tripoli in poor weather. Italian and Libyan naval vessels rescued 21 survivors, while at least 200 people drowned.	200–225	
2005	Bangladesh	Prince of Patuakhali – On 14 May, the ferry capsized and sank in deep water near Golapchipa, about 25 miles (40 km) east of Patuakhali.	200+	
2004	Bangladesh	Lighting Sun – On 23 May, the double-decker ferry capsized and sank on the Meghna river during a storm. Fifty people were rescued while 200 were reported killed in the accident. The Lighting Sun sank on the same day one kilometer away from the ferry Diganta.	200	
2009	Sierra Leone	2009 Sierra Leone ferry accident – On 8 September, a wooden Teh Teh ferry travelling from Shenge village to Tombo sank during a storm. At least 90 people to date have been confirmed, over 100 others have been listed as missing and 39 survivors rescued.	190	
2018	Indonesia	Sinking of MV Sinar Bangun – On 18 June in Lake Toba, North Sumatra, during its trip from Simanindo Harbour in Samosir Island to Tiga Ras Harbour in Simalungun Regency. The Indonesian National Transportation Safety Committee concluded that the sinking was caused by overloading. The crews' decision to load the ferry to four times its capacity, combined with improper loading of passengers and cargo, caused the ferry to be severely unstable.	3–167	
2003	Democratic Republic of the Congo	Dieu Merci – On 25 November, the ferry capsized and sank in Lake Mai-Ndombe killing 163 people on board. Over 200 people were rescued.	163	
2011	Libya	Mediterranean Sea migrant shipwreck of 6 April 2011 – An unnamed vessel that departed from Libya carrying 200–300 migrants from at least five African countries and Bangladesh sank in rough seas off the coast of Lampedusa, Italy. The Italian Coast Guard rescued 48 survivors, while at least 150 people were estimated to have drowned.	150–270	
2012	Tanzania	Skagit – A small passenger ferry sank off Zanzibar due to rough weather and overcrowding.	150	
2012	Papua New Guinea	Rabaul Queen – Overloaded ferry capsized on the morning of 2 February, due to rough conditions in the Solomon Sea. The final death toll is unknown because the exact number of passengers is unknown; estimates range from 88 to 223, with the official Commission of Inquiry estimating the dead at 146 to 165.	146–165	
2020	Senegal	A boat heading to the Canary Islands caught fire and capsized off the Senegalese coast. The boat was carrying 200 migrants.	140	
2006	Cameroon	On 23 March, an unnamed ship was sunk by a wave off the coast of Cameroon with 127 of the 150 on board killed.	127	
2011	Russia	Bulgaria – sank on 10 July in a storm on the Kuybyshev Reservoir of the Volga river near Syukeyevo, Tatarstan, while sailing from Bolgar to Kazan. Of the 201 people aboard 122 died.	122	
2013	Philippines	St. Thomas Aquinas – On 16 August, the roll-on/roll-off passenger ferry collided with the cargo ship Sulpicio Express Siete off the coast of Talisay, Cebu. It was reported that 55 were dead and 65 were missing.	120	
2012	Bangladesh	Shariatpur 1 – A double-deck ferry that capsized on 12 March, after colliding with a cargo ship on the Meghna River. At least 116 people died.	116	
2006	Djibouti	Al-Baraqua II – On 6 April, the ferry capsized in the Gulf of Tadjoura off the coast of Djibouti City. The ferry was carrying passengers from the capital to a religious festival in Tadjoura when the accident occurred shortly after departure with 116 on board being killed.	116	
2004	Philippines	SuperFerry 14 – On 27 February an Islamist terrorist attack resulted in the sinking of the ferry and the deaths of 116 people. It is regarded as the world's deadliest terrorist attack at sea.	116	
2004	Madagascar	Samson – On 7 March, the ferry was caught in Cyclone Gafilo off the Madagascan coast when it sank. Two of the 113 aboard survived.	111	
2023	Nigeria	On 12 June, a boat carrying wedding guests capsized on the Niger River in the Pategi district of Kwara State. At least 106 people were confirmed dead, while more than 100 others were rescued.	108+	
2024	Mozambique	Zico – On April 7, the vessel Zico, which had been converted from a fishing boat into a ferry, sank in the Mozambique Channel due to overcrowding. At least 100 people died of the 130 aboard.	100+	
2023	Italy	2023 Calabria migrant boat disaster – On 26 February, a boat carrying migrants sank amidst harsh weather conditions while trying to land on the coast of Steccato di Cutro, a seaside resort village near the town of Crotone in the region of Calabria in Southern Italy.	94+	
2024	Mauritania	A migrant boat heading for Europe capsized off the coast of Mauritania due to strong winds and waves. Out of the 170 people believed to be on board, 89 were declared dead, 72 are missing, and 9 were rescued.	89 (as of 5 July 2024)	
2024	Mauritania	2024 Nouakchott migrant boat disaster – A boat carrying migrants that departed from Gambia sank near Nouakchott, the capital of Mauritania, leaving 15 people dead and more than 195 missing.	15 (as of 24 July 2024)	
2024	DR Congo	On October 2, a ferry capsized and sank in Lake Kivu only 100 meters from its destination. 88 of the 276 people on board were killed.	88	
2024	DR Congo	HB la Saintet – On June 12, the ship HB la Saintet experienced engine failure and sank in the Kasai River, a tributary of the Congo River. 86 people of the 271 aboard were confirmed dead.	86	
2023	Greece	Adrianna – On June 14, a fishing boat smuggling migrants and refugees and estimated to be carrying 750 people sunk in the Ionian sea off the coast of Pylos, Messenia. The search and rescue effort by Greek authorities recovered 104 survivors and 82 bodies; it was estimated that 568 people were missing.	82+	
2018	Kiribati	MV Butiraoi – The overloaded ferry sank while traveling from Nonouti to Betio on 18 January. 81 of the 88 passengers perished.	81	
2026	Guyana	MV Barima – On 18 July, the state-owned vessel capsized and sank off the coast of Guyana. Out of at least 162 passengers and 17 crew on board, 77 were killed, 76 were rescued and more than 26 reported missing.	77	
2009	Bangladesh	Coco-4 – On 27 November, the overloaded passenger ferry partially capsized at port while passengers were disembarking. It is believed that the sudden shifting weight of the passengers caused the disaster.	75	
2009	Tonga	Princess Ashika – The ferry was traveling from Nukuʻalofa, to Ha'afeva when it sent out a mayday call just before 2300 hours on 5 August, followed by a distress beacon five minutes after the mayday call. One survivor described a "big wave" and "much water", claiming that it had happened very quickly. When it sank, the ferry had only made five voyages in its new role.	74	
2003	People's Liberation Army Navy	361 – On 16 April, the entire crew of 70 on the submarine were killed when the diesel engine failed to shut down while the boat was submerged and used up all the oxygen on board during a training exercise.	70	
2026	Philippines	MV Trisha Kerstin 3 - Sank off the waters of Basilan on January 26, while travelling from Zamboanga City to Jolo, Sulu. Approximately 65 people are confirmed to have died, 14 people are recorded as missing, and 293 survivors we recovered.	65	
2024	Central African Republic	An overloaded riverboat carrying more than 300 people capsized on the banks of Mpoko River.	66+ (as of 21 April 2024)	
2011	Libya	An unnamed ship carrying 72 people, mostly Ethiopian and Eritrean migrants, ran aground at Tripoli after drifting without fuel for 16 days. The ship had departed on 25 March in an attempt to reach Lampedusa, Italy. Last phone contact was on 26 March, and a French aircraft carrier within sight sent out reconnaissance flights overhead but did not aid the imperiled ship. Of the passengers and crew, 11 survived, with two more dying in the days following.	63	
2023	Cape Verde	2023 Cape Verde migrant boat disaster	63	
2015	Philippines	Kim Nirvana-B – On 2 July, the overloaded passenger ferry, en route to Camotes Islands from Ormoc, Leyte, capsized after making a sharp turn, killing 62 of the estimated 206 people on board.	62	
2021	DR Congo	A boat sank on the Congo River in Mai-Ndombe Province, killing at least 60 people.	60+	
2014	Bangladesh	Miraj-4 – On 15 May, the launch, while headed for Shariatpur, capsized and sank after it was caught in a storm near Doulatdia during the evening. The ferry was reported to have more passengers than the 122 person rated capacity allowed at the time of the accident. Of the estimated 150–200 on board 56 were killed.	56	
2012	Somalia	A boat carrying migrant workers from Somalia to Yemen sank on 18 December, killing 55 of the 60 people aboard.	55	
2001	Georgia	Pati – On 1 January, the cargo ship ran aground, broke in two, and sank in the Mediterranean Sea off Antalya, Turkey. The ship was carrying many illegal immigrants, about fifty of whom were killed, as well as ten crew members, four of whom died. There were a total of thirty-two survivors.	54	
2007	Malta	Malta migrant shipwreck – On 21 May, a small and crowded migrant boat was spotted some 80 nmi (150 km) south of Malta by the Maltese Air Force, and photographed while the 53 people on board were apparently trying to bail out water. Then the boat went missing. No trace of the boat or its occupants was found by the Maltese boats sent to their search and rescue, and there were no means by which they could have reached the shore during the time span in between.	53	
2021	Indonesia	Loss of KRI Nanggala – in April, the submarine was lost in sea during training with all 53 crew members.	53	
2008	Philippines	Don Dexter Cathlyn – On 4 November, the motor banca capsized and sank 30 minutes after it left Dimasalang, Masbate en route to Bulan, Sorsogon following the failure of an outrigger. Of those on board 42 were killed with 10 missing.	52	
2007	Indonesia	Levina 1 – On 22 February, the passenger ferry caught fire en route from Jakarta, to Bangka Island killing at least 51 people. Three days later, on February 25, it sank with a group of journalists and investigators on board, killing at least one more and leaving three missing.	51-52	
2009	Myanmar	Naywintun – On 17 November, the ferry, travelling between Pathein and Thetkelthaung, sank after colliding with a barge. At least 50 people reported killed.	50	
2010	Australia	2010 Christmas Island boat disaster – A boat carrying around 90 asylum seekers, mostly from Iraq and Iran, sank off the coast of Christmas Island, an Australian territory in the Indian Ocean, killing 48 people aboard; 42 survivors were rescued. The boat was later named SIEV-221.	48	
2009	Bangladesh	Bangladesh ferry accident – On 4 December, on the Daira river located in Mithamain Upazila, Kishoreganj District, a passenger ferry collided head-on with a launch. At least 47 people were killed.	47	
2009	India	Jalakanyaka – On 30 September, the double-decker passenger boat Jalakanyaka capsized and sank in Lake Thekkady, Periyar National Park, Kerala. A total of 82 people were on the boat and 45 died.	45	
2002	Philippines	Maria Carmela – On 11 April, the ferry caught fire while traveling from Masbate to Quezon. After burning for three days the ship sank off Pagbilao island in Quezon. Of those on board 44 were killed in the incident.	44	
2017	Argentina	ARA San Juan – On 15 November, the submarine sank while submerged during patrol in the South Atlantic. 44 lives were lost.	44	
2009	Vietnam	Gianh River boat accident – On 25 January, on the Gianh River near Quảng Hải Village, in the Quảng Trạch District of Quảng Bình Province. A wooden boat sank 20 meters from the shore in strong currents during windy conditions. There were reportedly over 80 people on board, yet the boat was capable of carrying only 20.	43	
2002	Azerbaijan	Mercury II – On 22 October, the cargo ship capsized and sank in the Caspian Sea with the loss of 43 of the 51 people on board.	43	
2008	Brazil	Comandante Sales – On 4 May, the passenger ferry capsized on the Solimoes River, killing 41 on board.	41	
2008	Bangladesh	Nazimuddin – On 13 May, the double-decker ferry carrying 150 passengers on board sank in the Ghorautura River, Ghoradigha, Kishoregani, 80 kilometres (43 nmi) from Dhaka, killing at least 41.	41	
2004	Bangladesh	Diganta – On 23 May, the ferry sank on the Meghna river during a storm with the loss of 40 of the 46 on board. The Diganta sank on the same day one kilometer away from the ferry Lighting Sun.	40	
2012	Hong Kong	Lamma IV – On 1 October, the ferry collided with another passenger vessel off Yung Shue Wan, Lamma Island. The day was the National Day of the People's Republic of China, and Lamma IV was headed for the commemorative firework display, scheduled to take place half an hour later. Many of the victims were the employees from Hongkong Electric Company and their relatives. It was the highest maritime death toll in Hong Kong since 1971.	39	
2022	United States	On 23 January, a boat carrying 40 migrants capsized off the coast of Fort Pierce, Florida. One survivor clinging to the boat was rescued, and one body was recovered by the Coast Guard. The remaining 38 passengers were never found.	39	
2025	Vietnam	Vịnh Xanh 58 – On 19 July, Vịnh Xanh 58 cruise ship, also known as the Wonder Sea, with registration number QN-7105, set off on a sightseeing tour in Hạ Long Bay, Vietnam, carrying 46 passengers and three crew members, and capsized due to high winds during an abrupt thunderstorm, killing at least 35 people. 10 people were rescued with non-fatal injuries, and four are still missing.	35	
2018	Indonesia	MV Lestari Maju - At noon on 3 July, a modified 10-ton cargo ship that operated domestic passenger service was deliberately grounded off the Selayar Islands. The ferry had reportedly suffered a leak on the port side of the lower deck. As the ferry began to sink, the captain decided to ground the ferry to stop the sinking and ease the rescue effort.	35	
2019	United States	On 2 September, Conception, a 75-foot diving boat, burned and sank while anchored off the coast of Santa Cruz Island, California, trapping sleeping passengers in their bunk room. 34 were presumed dead when officials called off the search for survivors.	34	
2021	Bangladesh	On 4 April, a boat capsized in the Shitalakkhya river in Narayanganj District. The boat was carrying at least 50 passengers.	34	
2009	Kiribati	Kiribati ferry accident – The sinking, on 13 July, of an inter-island ferry. The accident is believed to have killed 33 of the ship's 55 passengers and crew.	33	
2015	United States	El Faro – The United States-flagged combination roll-on/roll-off and lift-on/lift-off cargo ship was lost with all hands on 1 October, while sailing from Jacksonville, Florida, to San Juan, Puerto Rico, during Hurricane Joaquin.	33	
2023	Philippines	MV Lady Mary Joy 3 – A passenger ferry off Baluk-Baluk Island, Hadji Muhtamad, Basilan caught fire. The ship was towed and beached. 33 people died while around 200 passengers were rescued.	33	
2012	Italy	Costa Concordia – The Italian cruise ship ran aground, capsized and sank in shallow waters on 13 January off the Isola del Giglio, killing 32 people (27 passengers and 5 crewmembers) out of 3,216 passengers and 1,013 crewmembers aboard.	32	
2008	Bangladesh	Shourav – On 29 February, the ferry capsized and sank after being rammed by another ferry on the Buriganga River. All 31 people on board were killed.	31	
2009	Dubai	Demas Victory – A Dubai-based supply ship capsized 10 nautical miles (19 km) off the coast of the Qatari capital, Doha in rough seas on 30 June, at 6:30am local time. Over 30 people were accounted as missing.	30	
2014	Italy	Norman Atlantic – The Italian-owned Ro-PAX ferry, operated by the Greek company ANEK Lines, caught fire in the Adriatic Sea on 28 December. Out of 443 passengers, 56 crew and at least 6 stowaways, 25 passengers and at least three stowaways were lost at sea. Two crewmen of the Albanian tug Iliria were also killed on 30 December during the towing of the burning wreck.	30	
2019	Hungary	Hableány – On 29 May, 27 people were confirmed dead with 1 other missing when a tourist boat was struck by a floating hotel near the Margaret Bridge in Budapest.	28	
2022	China	Fu Jing 001 – On 2 July, crane vessel Fu Jing 001 broke into two parts and sank at about 190 mi (300 km) southwest of Hong Kong due to adverse weather brought by Typhoon Chaba. By 29 July, 25 crew members were confirmed dead, with 1 was still missing.	26	
2003	Tunisia	Amira-1 – On 9 January, the Tunisian cargo ship sent a distress signal about 100 kilometers from the Crimean coast. After a week of searching, the freighter was not found by Ukrainian, Turkish and Russian forces, and apart from a life jacket, life buoy and the lighthouse distress signal, no debris was found. The crew of 24 sailors was composed of 19 Tunisians, 3 Turkish and 2 Azerbaijanis. No bodies were found.	24	
2022	Thailand	HTMS Sukhothai – A corvette of the Royal Thai Navy was sunk after a storm in the Gulf of Thailand on 18 December, leaving 24 crew members dead and 5 others missing.	24	
2022	Spain	Villa de Pitanxo – On 15 February, the vessel capsized off the east coast of Canada. Three of the 24 crew members, including the captain, were rescued. The bodies of nine of the crew were recovered, the remaining 12 were never found and are presumed dead. The wreck was located in June 2023.	21	
2022	Japan	Kazu I - On 23 April, the tourist boat was operating off Hokkaido island. It went missing with 26 souls on board. Twenty people were confirmed dead, and six are still missing.	20	
2021	Liberia	Nico Ivanka - On 17 July, a cargo ship sank off the coast of Liberia with a reported twenty eight people on board. Eleven passengers and crew were rescued by the Sea Shepherd ship the MY Age of Union while the remaining seventeen were never found.	17	
2018	United States	Table Rock Lake duck boat accident – On 19 July, a duck boat operated by Ride the Ducks sank on Table Rock Lake in the Ozarks near Branson, Missouri. The amphibious vehicle sank with 31 people on board, leaving 17 dead, during high winds associated with nearby severe thunderstorms.	17	
2026	Kazakh Naval Forces	On 24 September, during a scheduled military training off the Munaily District coast of the Caspian Sea, a Kaisar-type scouting vessel has been carried off by a strong wind, leading to all 17 military personnel going missing into the sea. Out of the 17, three people made it back to shore, while 14 others drowned at sea.	14	
2024	India	On January 18, an overloaded boat capsized in Harni Lake outside Vadodara, Gujarat. Fourteen people (12 students and two teachers) drowned while 15 others were rescued.	13	
2021	United States	Seacor Power – On April 13, a 265 Class liftboat capsized in the Gulf of Mexico. 6 people were rescued from the water but 13 others were not found and are presumed to have drowned.	13	
2006	People's Liberation Army Navy	PLAN Lianjiang – On 22 June, the Type 037II Missile Boat Lianjiang of the Chinese People's Liberation Army Navy collided with a freighter near the Pearl River Estuary and sank immediately. 13 servicemen were killed.	13	
2003	United States	Andrew J. Barberi – On 23 October, the Staten Island Ferry vessel impacted a concrete maintenance pier, tearing into the main deck where passengers were waiting to disembark. 11 passengers were killed, while 70 others were injured. The pilot was found to have lost consciousness after operating the ferry under impairment from painkillers.	11	
2013	Nigeria	Jascon 4 – The tug capsized while in operation and sank; 11 crew members were killed. The cook Harrison Odjegba Okene survived in an air bubble in the wreckage and was rescued, possibly the only case someone survived in a sunken ship .	11	
2019	Luxembourg	Bourbon Rhode – The Luxembourg-registered tugboat capsized amid violent seas during Hurricane Lorenzo. Three of the 14 crew members were rescued alive while the bodies of four were recovered. The remaining seven are presumed dead.	11	
2017	United States	Destination – On 11 February, the BSAI crab vessel capsized and sank approximately 2.6 miles northwest of St. George Island off the Alaskan Coast, taking with her all six of her crew. The NTSB concluded that icing conditions and overloading of fishing gear compromised the vessel's stability.	10	
2024	Italy	Bayesian – On 19 August, the superyacht capsized and sank during a storm, when anchored off the coast of Sicily near the fishing village of Porticello. Seven people were killed, including British tech tycoon Mike Lynch and his daughter.	7	
2025	Egypt	A tourist submarine sank in the Red Sea off Hurghada, Egypt, killing 6 tourists, including 5 Russians.	6+	
2024	United States	MV Dali – On 26 March, the cargo vessel departed the Port of Baltimore in the United States, bound for Colombo, Sri Lanka. It collided with the Francis Scott Key Bridge, causing a structural failure.	6	
2025	Indonesia	The ferry KMP Tunu Pratama Jaya traveling from Banyuwangi in East Java to Bali sank in the Bali Strait, killing at least six people and leaving 29 others missing and 30 rescued.	6	
2023	United States	Titan submersible – Contact with the Titan submersible, operated by OceanGate, was lost on 18 June in the international waters of the North Atlantic ocean off the coast of Newfoundland. The submersible was on a viewing tour of the RMS Titanic. An implosion destroyed the submersible, with debris found and identified to have originated from the vessel by search and rescue personnel on 22 June. Five people were aboard.	5	
2019	United States	Scandies Rose – The 130-foot BSAI crab vessel capsized and sank near Sutwik Island, Alaska on 31 December, while en route from Kodiak to Dutch Harbor. Two of the seven crew members on board were rescued and ultimately survived, the other five were never found.	5	
2020	United States	Emmy Rose – On 23 November, the 82-foot long fishing vessel, registered at Portland, Maine, was lost in a storm at approximately 1:00 AM EST about 20 miles northeast of Provincetown, Massachusetts. The vessel was returning from a groundfish harvest with four experienced crew members aboard. No distress signal was sent, and the Coast Guard was only alerted when the vessel's emergency beacon was automatically activated. Debris and an empty life raft were both found by the Coast Guard, and a two-day search ensued, before being called off on November 25.	4	
2014	United Kingdom	Cheeki Rafiki – The UK-registered sailing vessel capsized in the north Atlantic Ocean after having lost its keel. All four crew members were never found.	4	
2019	United States	Leonardo – On 24 November, the New Bedford-registered, 57-foot scallop fishing vessel capsized and sank approximately 24 miles southwest of Martha's Vineyard, Massachusetts, after encountering rough weather and rogue waves. Of the four crew members aboard, only one was rescued after being found adrift in a life raft, and the Coast Guard suspended search efforts the following day.	3	
2021	United States	San Diego migrant vessel – On May 2, a 40-foot boat carrying 32 migrants from Mexico sank in stormy weather off the coast of San Diego. 29 of the migrants were saved by the United States Coast Guard, civilians, and other authorities. 3 migrants drowned.	3	
2026	Australia	Marine Rescue NSW vessel, recreational yacht — A yacht struck a breakwall near Ballina, New South Wales in heavy seas on the evening of 5 May. A Marine Rescue NSW vessel responded but capsized crossing the sandbar at the mouth of the Richmond River, resulting in the deaths of two of the volunteer rescuers on board, as well as the man from the yacht.	3	
2007	Greece	Sea Diamond – The ship sank on 5 April, with 1,195 passengers on board, after running aground near the island of Santorini the previous day, leaving two passengers missing and presumed dead.	2	
2006	Canada	Queen of the North – On 21 March, the RORO/passenger ferry failed to execute a planned course change and struck Gil Island while traveling through the Inside Passage from Prince Rupert to Port Hardy, both in British Columbia. The collision ripped open her hull and tore out her propellers, leaving her adrift in Wright Sound where she sank between 12:25 and 12:43 am the following morning.	2	
2020	Malaysia	MV Dayang Topaz – On 27 October, the ship sank after colliding with the Baram B oil platform, 14 nautical miles off Miri, Sarawak after one of its anchor wires snapped during adverse storm. Out of 187 personnel on the ship, 2 personnel, both Malaysian, were found dead.	2	
2025	United States	Cuauhtémoc – On Saturday evening, May 17, the Mexican Navy training ship, Cuauhtémoc, struck the Brooklyn Bridge while departing New York City. The ship's masts collided with the underside of the bridge, resulting in the loss of its topmasts and causing multiple injuries. The bridge itself did not sustain significant damage.	2	
2020	Lebanon	Orient Queen – The cruise ship was severely damaged while berthed in Beirut following a nearby ammonium nitrate explosion on August 4, before capsizing overnight on August 5.	2	
2013	Indonesia	PT Kalamur – A ship transporting employees belonging to PT Kalamur in Loa Buah, Samarinda, East Kalimantan sank in the waters of the Mahakam River on April 17, 2013. One passenger died and dozens of others are missing.	1	
2025	Indonesia	KM Gregorius Barcelona 5 – A passenger motor vessel caught fire off Talise Island, North Minahasa Regency, North Sulawesi, while sailing from Talaud Islands Harbor to Manado Harbor. A pregnant woman reportedly died.	1	
2026	Greece	On the night of 13 September, a boat carrying migrants sank 38 nautical miles off Gavdos. 51 people have been rescued, with one confirmed dead and 25 missing.	1	
2024	New Zealand	HMNZS Manawanui - On the night of 5 October, this specialist dive and hydrographic vessel for the New Zealand Navy was conducting a reef survey near the Cook Islands when it hit the reef and caught fire. All 75 people aboard were evacuated.	0	
2026	Indonesia	Virgo Transport 8 - On 13 September, 2026, the Indonesian roll-on/roll-off passenger-cargo ship that capsized and sank. The ferry had 243 passengers and crew on board. As of 29 September, 108 people have been rescued, 71 bodies have been recovered, and 64 remain missing. 135 are presumed dead.	71-135	

== Wartime disasters ==
=== Al-Qaeda insurgency in Yemen ===
Year	Country	Description	Deaths	Use	Image
2000	United States	USS Cole – On 12 October, the guided missile destroyer was damaged after being struck by a boat packed with explosives while she was being refueled in Aden harbor. Al-Qaeda claimed responsibility for the attack, which was believed to have been aided by Sudan.	19 (including the attackers)	Naval	

=== Korean conflict ===
Year	Country	Description	Deaths	Use	Image
2010	South Korea	ROKS Cheonan – On 26 March the South Korean corvette sank off the country's west coast near Baengnyeong Island in the Yellow Sea, with international investigators blaming the disaster on a North Korean torpedo.	46	Naval	

=== Myanmar civil war (2021–present) ===
Year	Country	Description	Deaths	Use	Image
2024	Myanmar	Three Landing Craft Medium - The Arakan Army announced the sinking of three junta landing craft between 7 and 8 February along the Kaladan River in Kyautaw, Rakhine State, with the estimated loss of up to 900 lives. The ships contained junta soldiers and their families who were retreating from Arakan Army's recent offensive. The survivors of the sinking were reportedly shot at and attacked with knives by villagers and soldiers, which a spokesperson for the Arkhan Army denied. This is the largest war related maritime disaster since the Chinese Civil War over 75 years before.	700-900	Naval Transportation	

=== Russo-Ukrainian War ===
Year	Country	Description	Deaths	Use	Image
2022	Ukraine	Ukrainian patrol vessel Sloviansk - On 3 March the former US Coast Guard Cutter was sunk by a Russian cruise missile near Odesa Oblast in the Black Sea; an unknown number of Ukrainian sailors are missing.	Several missing, unknown as of 11 March	Naval	
2022	Russia	Russian cruiser Moskva - On 13 April, Ukrainian officials claimed that the flagship of the Russian Black Sea Fleet had been hit by two Neptune anti-ship missiles and was on fire in rough seas. On 14 April, the Russian Ministry of Defense announced that the guided missile cruiser had sunk while being towed during stormy weather; the Russians attributed this to hull damage sustained from a munitions explosion.	Ukrainian official claims 125-300 Russian sailors killed.	Naval	

=== Iran War (2026) ===
Year	Country	Description	Deaths	Use	Image
2026	Iran	Sinking of IRIS Dena - On 4 March, 2026, the Moudge-class frigate was sunk by a US Navy submarine off the coast of Sri Lanka. At least 80 people were killed and at least 60 are missing, 32 were rescued.	104	Frigate	

== See also ==
- List of maritime disasters
- List of maritime disasters in the 18th century
- List of maritime disasters in the 19th century
- List of maritime disasters in the 20th century
- List of maritime disasters in World War I
- List of maritime disasters in World War II
- Shipwreck
- List of shipwrecks
- List of disasters
- List of accidents and disasters by death toll
- List of ships sunk by submarines by death toll
- List of RORO vessel accidents
- List of migrant vessel incidents on the Mediterranean Sea
