= 2012 =

2012 in various calendars
- Gregorian calendar: 2012; MMXII
- Ab urbe condita: 2765
- Armenian calendar: 1461; ԹՎ ՌՆԿԱ
- Assyrian calendar: 6762
- Baháʼí calendar: 168–169
- Balinese saka calendar: 1933–1934
- Bengali calendar: 1418–1419
- Berber calendar: 2962
- British Regnal year: 60 Eliz. 2 – 61 Eliz. 2
- Buddhist calendar: 2556
- Burmese calendar: 1374
- Byzantine calendar: 7520–7521
- Chinese calendar: 辛卯年 (Metal Rabbit); 4709 or 4502 — to — 壬辰年 (Water Dragon); 4710 or 4503
- Coptic calendar: 1728–1729
- Discordian calendar: 3178
- Ethiopian calendar: 2004–2005
- Hebrew calendar: 5772–5773
- Hindu calendars
- Vikram Samvat: 2068–2069
- Shaka Samvat: 1933–1934
- Kali Yuga: 5112–5113
- Holocene calendar: 12012
- Igbo calendar: 1012–1013
- Iranian calendar: 1390–1391
- Islamic calendar: 1433–1434
- Japanese calendar: Heisei 24 (平成２４年)
- Javanese calendar: 1945–1946
- Juche calendar: 101
- Julian calendar: Gregorian minus 13 days
- Korean calendar: 4345
- Minguo calendar: ROC 101 民國101年
- Nanakshahi calendar: 544
- Thai solar calendar: 2555
- Tibetan calendar: ལྕགས་མོ་ཡོས་ལོ་ (female Iron-Hare); 2138 or 1757 or 985 — to — ཆུ་ཕོ་འབྲུག་ལོ་ (male Water-Dragon); 2139 or 1758 or 986
- Unix time: 1325376000 – 1356998399

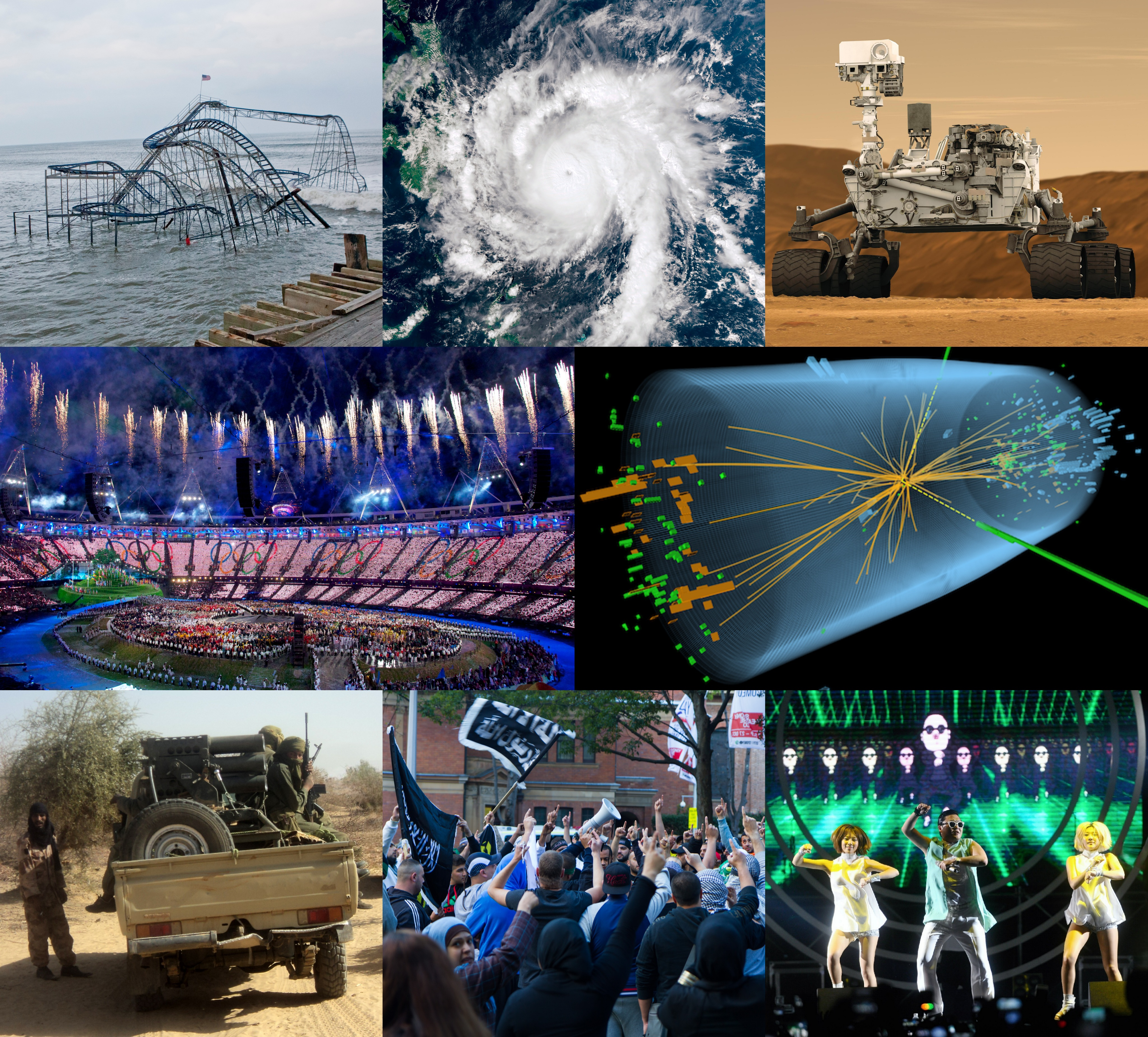
Clockwise from top-left: Damage to Casino Pier in Seaside Heights, New Jersey as a result of Hurricane Sandy; the hurricane devastated the Mid-Atlantic region, especially New York City, and killed 254; Typhoon Bopha made landfall at its highest intensity and hit Mindanao, Philippines, causing 1,901 deaths; NASA's Curiosity Rover lands on the surface of Mars; The Higgs boson, an elementary particle, is discovered by CERN and revolutionizes quantum physics; K-pop artist Psy performs his hit single "Gangnam Style", which became a cultural phenomenon in 2012; A crowd of protesters at the 2012 Sydney Anti-Islamic Film Demonstration protest against the film Innocence of Muslims; Tuareg militants, seen driving near Timbuktu, Mali during the Mali war; The 2012 Summer Olympics are held in London, United Kingdom.

2012 (MMXII) was a leap year starting on Sunday of the Gregorian calendar, the 2012th year of the Common Era (CE) and Anno Domini (AD) designations, the 12th year of the 3rd millennium and the 21st century, and the 3rd year of the 2010s decade.

2012 was designated as:

- International Year of Cooperatives
- International Year of Sustainable Energy for All

== Events ==
=== January ===
- January 4 – The Cicada 3301 internet hunt begins.
- January 12 – Peaceful protests begin in the Romanian city of Târgu Mureș, protesters expressing solidarity towards certain figures in the medical field and calling for the resignation of president Traian Băsescu. The protests would soon spread through all of the country, marking the start of a long civil unrest in Romania, lasting up to November 2015.
- January 13 – The passenger cruise ship Costa Concordia runs aground off the coast of Italy, causing 32 deaths.
- January 18 – As part of a series of protests against the Stop Online Piracy Act and the PROTECT IP Act, the English Wikipedia, along with other websites, goes dark for 24 hours, starting at midnight Eastern Standard Time (05:00 UTC).
- January 23 – Iran–European Union relations: the European Union adopts an embargo against Iran in protest of its continued effort to enrich uranium.

=== February ===
- February 1 – Egypt's deadliest football incident known as the Port Said Stadium riot is sparked after local Port Said Al Masry fans attack supporters of Cairo-based team Al Ahly SC. The massacre results in 74 deaths: 72 Al Ahly fans, 1 Al Masry fan and 1 police officer. Most of the deaths are caused by stabbing, fans thrown off the stands and a stampede.
- February 6
  - The Diamond Jubilee of Elizabeth II commemorates 60 years since the accession of Elizabeth II as Queen of the United Kingdom and other Commonwealth realms.
  - A magnitude 6.7 earthquake strike in the central Philippines island of Negros, leaving 112 people dead.
- February 19 – Iran suspends oil exports to Britain and France, following sanctions put in place by the European Union and the United States in January.
- February 21 – Greek government-debt crisis: Eurozone finance ministers reach an agreement on a second, €130-billion Greek bailout.
- February 26 – Seventeen-year-old African-American student Trayvon Martin is shot to death by neighborhood watch coordinator George Zimmerman in an altercation in Sanford, Florida.
- February 27 – Yemeni President Ali Abdullah Saleh formally transfers power to Vice President Abdrabbuh Mansur Hadi, after a year of mass protests, ending his 33-year-long reign.

=== March ===
- March 1 – Sauli Niinistö is inaugurated as the 12th President of Finland.
- March 4
  - A series of explosions is reported at a munitions dump in Brazzaville, the capital of the Republic of the Congo, with at least 250 people dead.
  - Vladimir Putin is elected President of Russia.
- March 5 – Air date of Kony 2012 (viral documentary film) on YouTube.
- March 12 – A coach carrying school pupils and teachers crashes while travelling through Sierre Tunnel on the A9 motorway in western Switzerland. Of the 52 people on board, 28 are killed, among them 22 children.
- March 13 – After 246 years since its first publication, the Encyclopædia Britannica discontinues its print edition.
- March 15 – Communist party chief of Chongqing Bo Xilai, well known for his neo-Maoist leanings and policies, is removed from his post after a large scandal involving the murder of British businessman Neil Heywood and an incident involving the Chongqing police chief Wang Lijun.
- March 22
  - The President of Mali, Amadou Toumani Touré, is ousted in a coup d'état after mutinous soldiers attack government offices.
  - Pakistan wins the 2012 Asia Cup cricket tournament.

=== April ===
- April 6 – The National Movement for the Liberation of Azawad unilaterally declares the independence of Azawad from Mali.
- April 11 -
  - Kim Jong Un was elected First Secretary of the Workers' Party of Korea, and his father, Kim Jong Il, was given the appellation "Eternal General Secretary of the Workers' Party of Korea".
  - An 8.6 earthquake strikes Indonesia triggering a small tsunami that hits the coast of Aceh.
- April 12 – Mutinous soldiers in Guinea-Bissau stage a coup d'état and take control of the capital city, Bissau. They arrest interim President Raimundo Pereira and leading presidential candidate Carlos Gomes Júnior in the midst of a presidential election campaign.
- April 13 – Kwangmyŏngsŏng-3, a North Korean Earth observation satellite, explodes shortly after launch. The United States and other countries had called the impending launch a violation of United Nations Security Council demands. The launch was planned to mark the centenary of the birth of Kim Il Sung, the founder of the republic.
- April 20 – Bhoja Air Flight 213 crashes near Rawalpindi, Pakistan, killing all 127 people on board.
- April 25 – Former Liberian President Charles Taylor is found guilty on 11 counts of aiding and abetting war crimes and crimes against humanity during the Sierra Leone Civil War.

=== May ===
- May 2 – A pastel version of The Scream, by the Norwegian painter Edvard Munch, sells for US$120 million in a New York City auction, setting a new world record for an auctioned work of art.
- May 6 – Legislative elections are held in Greece to elect all 300 members of the Hellenic Parliament and the New Democracy party led by Antonis Samaras, comes out as the largest party winning 108 out of 300 seats.
- May 12–August 12 – The 2012 World Expo takes place in Yeosu, South Korea.
- May 19 – Chelsea wins the 2011-12 UEFA Champions League held in Munich, Germany by beating the home side Bayern Munich in the final.
- May 20
  - Presidential elections were held in the Dominican Republic, Danilo Medina result as president-elect.
  - An annular solar eclipse visible from Asia and North America is the 58th solar eclipse from 73 solar eclipses of Solar Saros 128.
- May 22 – Tokyo Skytree, the tallest self-supporting tower in the world at 634 metres high, is opened to the public.
- May 22–26 – The Eurovision Song Contest 2012 takes place in Baku, Azerbaijan, and is won by Swedish entrant Loreen with the song "Euphoria".
- May 25 – Houla massacre takes place, perpetrated by the Syrian Arab Army, with 108 being killed.

=== June ===
- June 3 – Dana Air Flight 0992, on a flight from Abuja to Lagos, Nigeria, suffered a dual-engine failure during its approach to Lagos where it crashed onto buildings, killing all 153 people on board and six on the ground.
- June 5–6 – The century's second and last solar transit of Venus occurs. The next pair are predicted to occur in 2117 and 2125.
- June 6 – 2012 Middle East respiratory syndrome coronavirus outbreak first identified.
- June 8 – UEFA Euro 2012, hosted by Poland and Ukraine, begins in Warsaw, with a match between Poland and Greece, which ends 1-1.
- June 17 – Snap legislative elections are held in Greece, following failure to form a government, to elect all 300 members of the Hellenic Parliament and the New Democracy party, led by Antonis Samaras, comes out as the largest party winning 129 out of 300 seats.
- June 18 – Shenzhou 9, a Chinese spacecraft carrying three Chinese astronauts, including the first-ever female, docks manually with orbiting module Tiangong-1, making this the third country, after the United States and Russia, successfully to perform the mission.
- June 21 – The Congress of Paraguay approves the impeachment of president Fernando Lugo. He is removed from power the next day, and Vice President Federico Franco becomes the new president.
- June 24 – Lonesome George, the last known individual of the Pinta Island tortoise subspecies, dies in Galápagos National Park, thus making the subspecies extinct.
- June 30
  - Mohamed Morsi, a member of the Muslim Brotherhood, is elected 5th President of Egypt, the first elected democratically by the Egyptian people, sparking mixed reactions and protests throughout the country.
  - An extra leap second (23:59:60) is added to end of June. The last time this occurred was in 2008.

=== July ===
- July 1 – The final match of the UEFA Euro 2012 takes place in Kyiv between Spain and Italy. Spain wins 4–0, achieving victorious from the third international tournament in a row, after winning UEFA Euro 2008 and the 2010 FIFA World Cup.
- July 4
  - CERN announces the discovery of a new particle with properties consistent with the Higgs boson after experiments at the Large Hadron Collider.
  - Sport Club Corinthians Paulista wins the Copa Libertadores by beating the Boca Juniors.
- July 15 – South Korean rapper Psy releases his hit single Gangnam Style.
- July 20 – 2012 Aurora theater shooting: 12 people are killed and 58 are injured in a mass shooting at a movie theater in Aurora, Colorado. The shooter, James Holmes, opens fire on a crowd during a screening of The Dark Knight Rises.
- July 21 – Turkish adventurer Erden Eruç becomes the first person in history to complete a solo human-powered circumnavigation of the Earth.
- July 23 – The Solar storm of 2012 is an unusually large coronal mass ejection emitted by the Sun which barely misses the Earth by nine days. If it had hit, it would have caused up to US$2.6 trillion in damages to electrical equipment worldwide.
- July 27–August 12 – The 2012 Summer Olympics are held in London, England, United Kingdom.
- July 30–31 – In the worst power outage in world history, the 2012 India blackouts leave 620 million people without power.

=== August ===
- August 1 – Microsoft finishes development of Windows 8, with general availability announced for October 26.
- August 6 – Curiosity, the Mars Science Laboratory mission's rover, successfully lands on Mars.
- August 25 – The Voyager 1 space probe becomes the first human-made object to successfully exit the Solar System and enter Interstellar space, and to an extent, becoming the first Interstellar probe, pioneering Interstellar exploration.
- August 31 – Armenia severs diplomatic relations with Hungary, following the extradition to Azerbaijan and subsequent pardoning of Ramil Safarov, who was convicted of killing an Armenian soldier in Hungary in 2004. The move is also met with fierce criticism from other countries.

=== September ===
- September 4 – Windows 7 overtakes Windows XP in market share globally.
- September 7 – Canada officially cuts diplomatic ties with Iran by closing its embassy in Tehran, and orders the expulsion of Iranian diplomats from Ottawa, over support for Syria, nuclear plans and human rights abuses.
- September 11–27 – A series of terrorist attacks are directed against United States diplomatic missions worldwide, as well as diplomatic missions of Germany, Switzerland and the United Kingdom. In the US, opinions are divided over whether the attacks are a reaction to a YouTube trailer for the film Innocence of Muslims. In Libya, US ambassador J. Christopher Stevens is among those killed during attacks in Benghazi.
- September 22 – The United Kingdom informs the World Health Organization about a novel coronavirus case originating from Saudi Arabia.

=== October ===
- October 3 – Jimmy Savile sexual abuse scandal: Mark Williams-Thomas presents the ITV documentary which exposes Jimmy Savile as a paedophile. The revelations of Savile's prolific sexual abuse crimes results in widespread shock and disgust across the United Kingdom, resulting in a national scandal, a police investigation into Savile's crimes, and all television episodes featuring him being removed from syndication.
- October 4 – Racing legend Michael Schumacher announced his retirement from Formula One during the Japanese Grand Prix.
- October 14 – Austrian skydiver Felix Baumgartner becomes the first person to break the sound barrier without any machine assistance, during a record space dive out of the Red Bull Stratos helium-filled balloon from 128,000 ft (24 miles (39 km)) over Roswell, New Mexico in the United States.
- October 16 – Seven paintings worth $25 million are stolen from the Kunsthal in Rotterdam, the Netherlands.
- October 22 – November 2 – Hurricane Sandy, the largest Atlantic hurricane on record (as measured by diameter, with tropical-storm-force winds spanning 900 miles (1,400 km)), wreaks havoc, resulting in 233 total deaths and $68.7 billion (2012 USD) damage.
- October 25 – North Kalimantan is established as the 34th province of Indonesia.
- October 26 – Microsoft releases Windows 8 to the general public.
- October 28 – Jorge Lorenzo becomes the World Champion of the 2012 Grand Prix motorcycle racing season.

=== November ===
- November 6 – 2012 United States presidential election: Barack Obama is reelected President of the United States, defeating his Republican challenger Mitt Romney.
- November 13
  - Activision releases Call of Duty: Black Ops II.
  - A total solar eclipse occurs in parts of Australia and the South Pacific. It is the 45th of 72 solar eclipses of Solar Saros 133.
- November 14–21 – Israel launches Operation Pillar of Defense against the Palestinian-governed Gaza Strip, killing Hamas military chief Ahmed Jabari. In the following week 140 Palestinians and five Israelis are killed in an ensuing cycle of violence. A ceasefire between Israel and Hamas is announced by Egyptian Foreign Minister Mohamed Kamel Amr and US Secretary of State Hillary Clinton after the week-long escalation in hostilities in Southern Israel and the Gaza Strip.
- November 15 – After the 18th National Congress of the Chinese Communist Party, Xi Jinping succeeds Hu Jintao as the General Secretary of the Chinese Communist Party and becomes the top leader of China.
- November 25–December 9 – Typhoon Bopha, known as "Pablo" in the Philippines, kills at least 1,067 with around 838 people missing. The typhoon causes considerable damage in the island of Mindanao.
- November 29 – The UN General Assembly approves a motion granting Palestine non-member observer state status.

=== December ===
- December 4-6 – Egyptian protestors protest outside the presidential palace against the 2012 constitutional declaration which gave President Morsi influence over the judiciary and turns violent when Morsi supporters clashed with anti-Morsi protestors. It led to the intervention of security forces. The incident caused the deaths of at least 10, including anti-Morsi protestors and supporters of Morsi as well as hundreds of injuries.
- December 6 – The U.S. state of Washington becomes the first jurisdiction in the modern world to officially legalize the possession of cannabis for personal use.
- December 6–16 – The 2012 FIFA Club World Cup is held in Japan and won by Sport Club Corinthians Paulista.
- December 8 – The UN Climate Change Conference in Qatar agrees to extend the Kyoto Protocol until 2020.
- December 10 – The Séléka overthrows the government of the Central African Republic which leads to the outbreak of a Civil war.
- December 12
  - North Korea successfully launches satellite Kwangmyongsong-3 Unit 2.
  - December 12 would be the last time in the 21st century that the month, day and final two digits of the year are the exact same (12/12/12). The next time this will happen will be on New Year's Day in 2101 (01/01/01).
- December 14 – Sandy Hook Elementary School shooting: Adam Lanza kills his mother before driving to Sandy Hook Elementary School, shooting dead twenty students and six teachers before killing himself in Newtown, Connecticut. It becomes the deadliest school shooting at a K-12 school in U.S. history.
- December 16 – The 2012 Delhi gang rape and murder, otherwise known as the Nirbhaya case, occurred on the night of December 16, 2012. The case involved the fatal assault of a 22-year-old physiotherapy intern by a group of six men in a moving bus.
- December 17 – Spanish bank Grupo Santander announces the acquisition of the remaining 10% of Banesto it did not yet own, effectively absorbing it into Banco Santander.
- December 18 – At least 55 people drown after an overcrowded boat capsizes off the coast of Somalia.
- December 21
  - The music video for Psy's "Gangnam Style" becomes the first YouTube video to reach a billion views.
  - 2012 phenomenon: End of 13th b'ak'tun in the Mayan calendar, supposed end of the world according to new age beliefs. Festivities took place to commemorate the event in the countries that were part of the Maya civilization (Mexico, Guatemala, Honduras, and El Salvador), with main events at Chichén Itzá in Mexico and Tikal in Guatemala.
- December 28 – Japanese supercentarian Jiroemon Kimura surpasses the final age of Danish-American supercentarian Christian Mortensen of 115 years, 252 days and becomes the oldest validated man in recorded history.

== Nobel Prizes ==

- Chemistry – Robert Lefkowitz and Brian Kobilka, for studies of G-protein-coupled receptors.
- Economics – Alvin E. Roth and Lloyd Shapley, for the theory of stable allocations and the practice of market design.
- Literature – Mo Yan, who with hallucinatory realism merges folk tales, history and the contemporary.
- Peace – European Union, for over six decades contributed to the advancement of peace and reconciliation, democracy and human rights in Europe.
- Physics – Serge Haroche and David J. Wineland, for ground-breaking experimental methods that enable measuring and manipulation of individual quantum systems.
- Physiology or Medicine – John B. Gurdon and Shinya Yamanaka, for the discovery that mature cells can be reprogrammed to become pluripotent.

== New English words ==
- hot take
- escape room

== See also ==
- 2012 phenomenon
