= Steve Mbikayi Mabuluki =

Steve Mbikayi Mabuluki (born 23 January 1963) is a politician who is the Minister of Humanitarian Actions and National Solidarity under President Félix Tshisekedi in the Democratic Republic of the Congo.

== Biography ==
He was born in Kasai-Occidental.

The minister issued a statement after the 2021 Congo River disaster.

In March 2022, Steve Mbikayi Mabuluki wants a change to a presidential regime and a change in the term of office from 5 to 7 years.
