= Patterson Brothers Shipping Company =

Fiji transport company

Patterson Brothers Shipping Company LTD
- Industry: Passenger and freight shipping, freight forwarding and logistics
- Founded: 1924
- Founder: George Patterson with son’s Henry Patterson and Robert Patterson
- Headquarters: Suva, Fiji
- Number of locations: 7 Suva; Nakasi; Lautoka; Labasa; Savusavu; Nabouwalu; Levuka
- Area served: Viti Levu, Vanua Levu, Ovalau, Koro Island, Kadavu Island, Fiji
- Key people: George Patterson; Trevor Patterson; David Patterson
- Products: Ferries, passenger transportation, freight transportation, holidays, business travel
- Owner: George Patterson; Trevor Patterson; Henry Patterson
- Number of employees: 200+
- Subsidiaries: Fiji Searoad Service; Searoad Shipping; Searoad Logistics

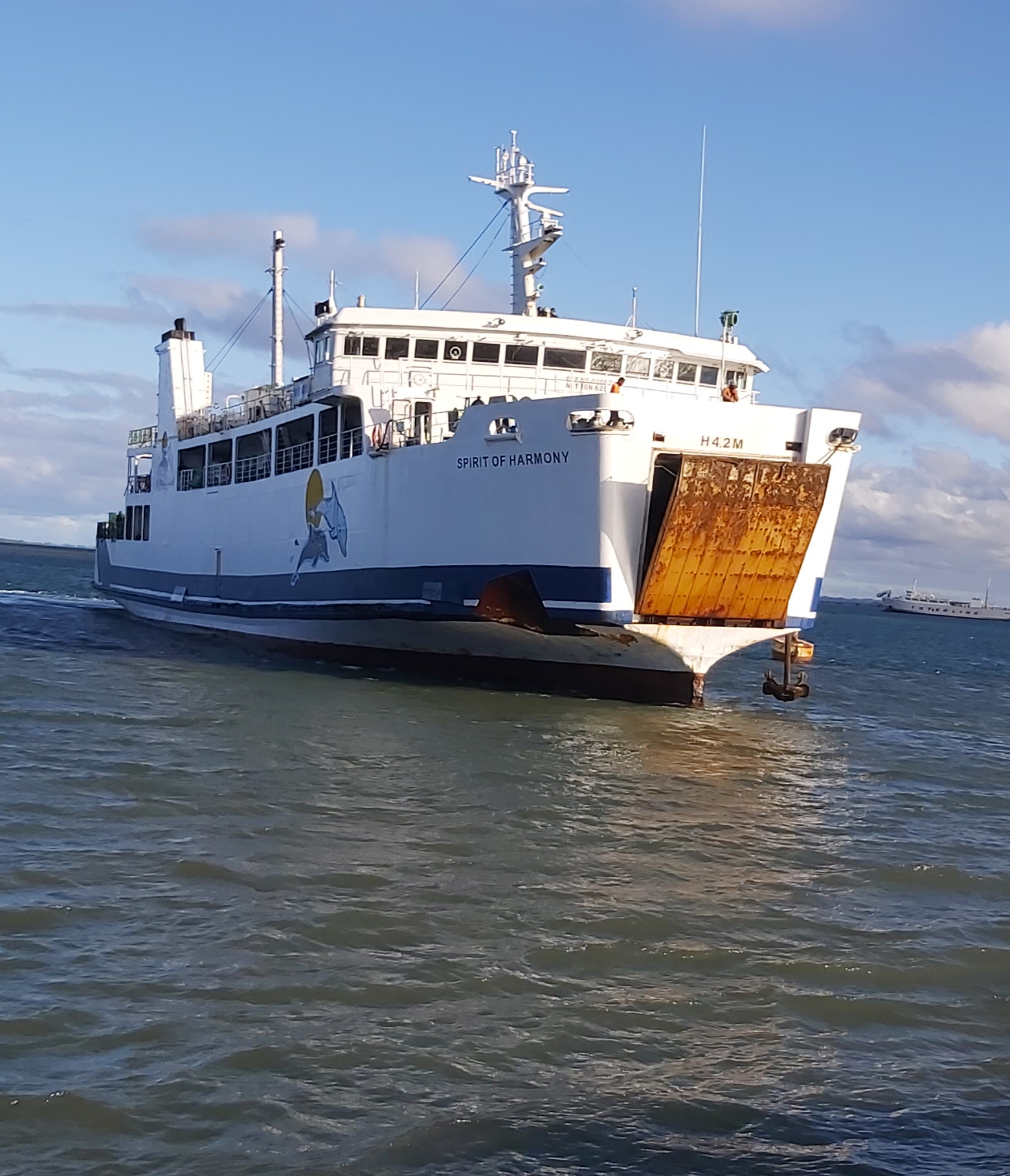
MV Spirit of Harmony at Natovi Landing

Patterson Brothers Shipping Company LTD is Fiji's longest running inter-island ferry operation bridging the gap between Viti Levu, Vanua Levu, and Ovalau daily. They also provide trips to Kadavu and Koro islands.

The company is a family run inter-island ferry operation with offices based in Suva, Nakasi, Lautoka, Labasa, Savusavu, Nabouwalu and Levuka and Agents located at Ba, Tavua, Rakiraki, Dreketi, Lekutu and Seaqaqa. The company operates roll-on/roll-off freight and passenger shipping across Fiji and trucking and logistics and freight services across the Pacific Ocean.

The integrated land and sea transportation service jointly provided by Patterson Brothers Shipping Company Ltd and Fiji Searoad Service connecting the main islands of Fiji via multi-modal transport system with Roro ferries and coach transfers.

== History ==
The company has its origins in Levuka, founded by George Patterson with his son’s Henry Patterson and Robert Patterson in 1924. Inter-island ferry operations began in 1924. By 2020, the company had more than 200 staff across Fiji.

== Area served ==
- Lautoka - Natovi - Nabouwalu - Labasa/Savusavu
- Suva - Natovi - Nabouwalu - Labasa/savusavu
- Suva - Natovi - Buresala - Levuka
- Suva - Natovi - Koro
- Suva - Vunisea - Kavala (Kadavu Island)
- Suva - Kavala - Vunisea (Kadavu Island)
- Suva - Rotuma (Franchise)
- Suva - Lau Islands (Franchise)

== Fleet ==
=== Current ===
Ship	Flag	Built	Entered service	Gross tonnage	Length	Width	Passengers	Cars	Knots
MV Spirit of Harmony (SOH)	(Fiji)	1991	2007	1,505 GT	65 m	14.5 m	450	60	17
MV Spirit of Love (SOL)	(Fiji)	2001	2013	2,305 GT	15 m	24 m	300	50	15
MV Spirit of Altruism (SOA)	(Fiji)	1972	2014	3,474 GT	74.16 m	16.8 m	600	75	14

=== Former ships ===
Ship	Years in service	Gross tonnage	Current status
AK Jubilee	1928-1947		
MV Wanderer			
MV Malahini			
MV Ovalau I	1952-1974		
MV Jubilee I	1958-1979		
MV Yatu Lau	1969-1983		
TSMV Ovalau II	1983-2003		
TSMV Jubilee II	1984-1997		
MV Princess Ashika	1989–2009	677 GT	
MV Island Navigator	1999–2008	647 GT	
