= Paul Karalus =

Former Tongan politician

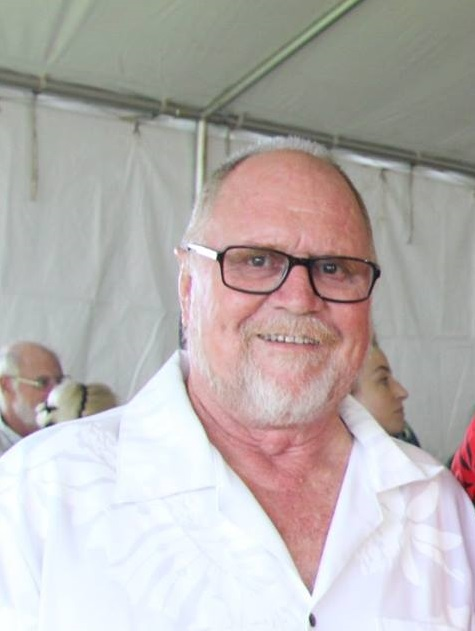
- Paul Karalus in 2017

Minister of Transport
- In office 17 May 2006 – 11 August 2009
- Prime Minister: Feleti Sevele

Paul Karalus is a former Tongan Cabinet Minister. He resigned following the MV Princess Ashika disaster.

Karalus is from Taranaki. He had worked in airline management, and as a coffee farmer and exporter before entering politics.

In May 2006 he was appointed Minister for Civil Aviation, Marine and Ports by Prime Minister Feleti Sevele. Following the 2006 Nukuʻalofa riots he was responsible for organising the rebuild of Nukuʻalofa's central business district. The funding of the rebuild via a US$50 million loan from China caused controversy and further pro-democracy protests.

On 5 August 2009 the MV Princess Ashika sank, killing 74 people. Karalus resigned six days later. During the subsequent Commission of Inquiry Karalus was criticised by officials for mishandling his portfolio and making decision swithout their advice; he in turn blamed officials for the disaster. The final report of the inquiry found that he had lied and provided false information to the government and parliament about the state of the vessel. In August 2010 he sought a judicial review of the adverse findings. The appeal was rejected. Following the conviction of Ashika's captain in a criminal trial, relatives of the victims called for Karalus' prosecution. In April 2011 he apologised for the disaster.

In September 2012 a parliamentary select committee found that the loan for the rebuilding of Nukuʻalofa was illegal and has been misspent and recommended criminal charges. Karalus and former Prime Minister Feleti Sevele later sought a judicial review of the report. The application was rejected in May 2013.

Karalus later became manager of Tonga's Air Terminal Service.

== Honours ==
National honours

- Order of Queen Sālote Tupou III, Knight Grand Cross (31 July 2008).
