= Natovi Landing =

- Port
- Location in Fiji
- Country: Fiji
- Island: Viti Levu
- Division: Central Division
- Province: Tailevu
- Time zone: UTC+12 (FJT)
  - Summer (DST): UTC+13 (FJST)

Natovi Landing is a ferry port in Tailevu Province, Fiji, linking cargo trucks to the three big islands of Fiji. Nearby Korovou is the closest drop off for travelers trekking with local buses, the post is mainly service by Patterson Brothers Shipping Company.
