= Capsizing of the Villa de Pitanxo =

2022 disaster

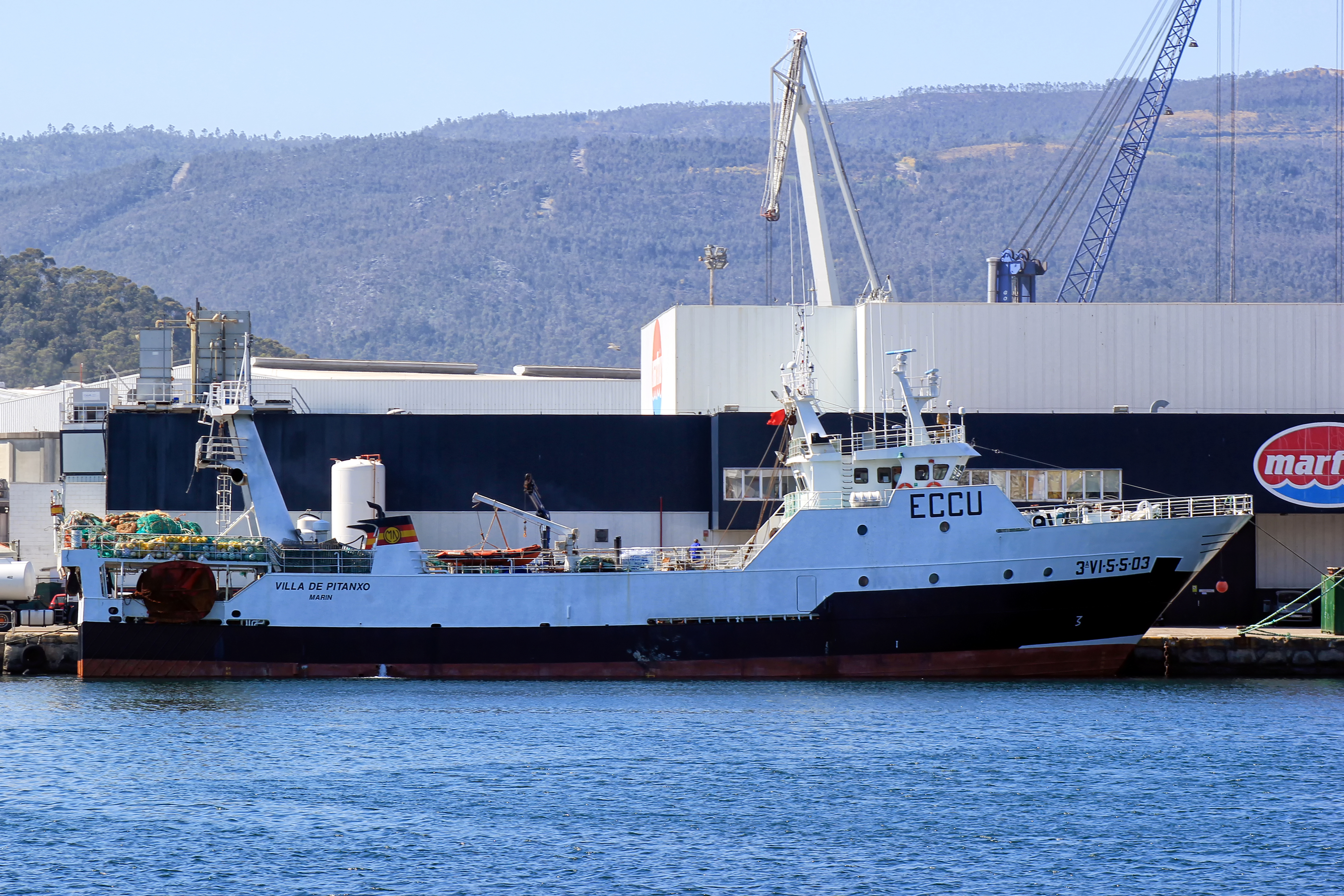

History

Spanish
- Name: Villa de Pitanxo
- Launched: 2004
- Identification: IMO number: 9098244; MMSI number: 224819000; Call Sign: ECCU
- Fate: Sank off the coast of Newfoundland and Labrador, Canada, on February 15, 2022.

General characteristics
- Class & type: Fishing vessel
- Tonnage: 825 GT
- Length: 50 m (164 ft 1 in)
- Beam: 10 m (32 ft 10 in)
- Draft: 6.8 m (22 ft 4 in)

Villa de Pitanxo was a Spanish fishing trawler that sank off the coast of Newfoundland and Labrador, Canada, on February 15, 2022. Twenty-one people died in the sinking.

== Background ==
At approximately 2:30 am, on February 15, 2022, the Villa de Pitanxo's emergency beacon was activated, initiating a search and rescue effort by the Joint Rescue Coordination Centre Halifax.

== See also ==
- Weather of 2022
- List of maritime disasters in the 21st century
