= Mpoko River =

River in the Central African Republic

Coordinates: 04°19′27″N 18°32′32″E

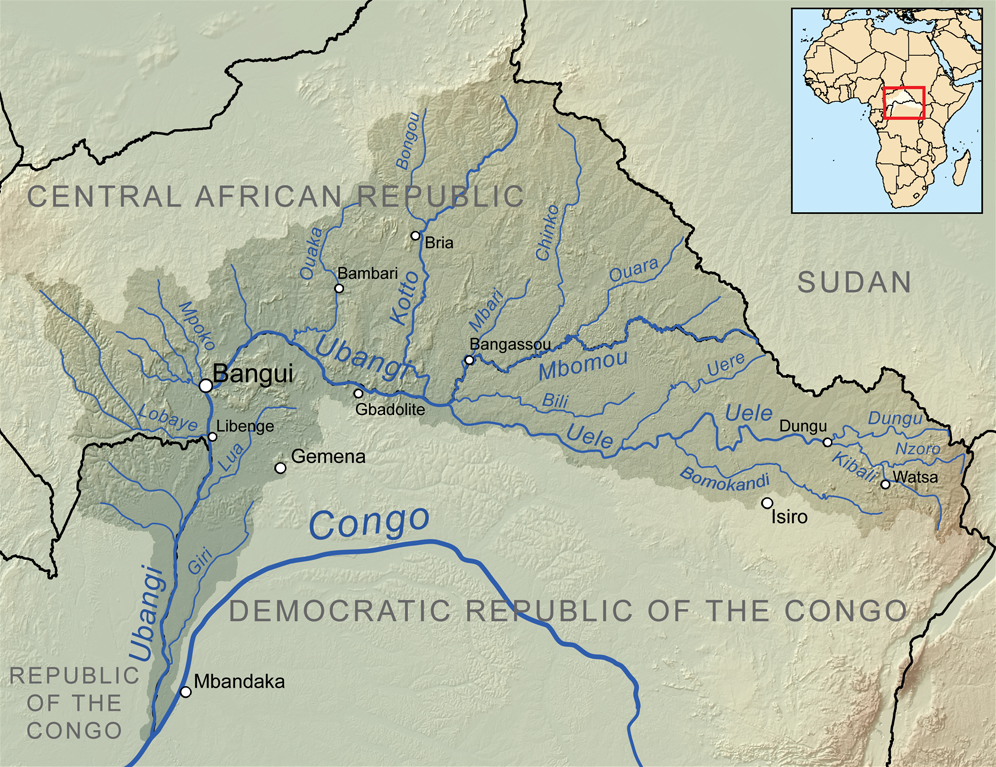
The Oubangui River basin with the Mpoko (center left)

The Mpoko River is a river in Central African Republic It is a tributary of the Oubangui River. The river is located near Bangui, the capital of the Central African Republic.

== Description ==
It is a small tributary off the Oubangui river, which is a tributary off the larger Congo River. The Mpoko River covers 23,900 km^{2} of land area and 86% savanna cover. It begins northwest of the capital, Bangui, and flows southeast to its confluence near Bangui. It drains a savanna dominated ecosystem.

== History surrounding Mpoko River ==
Starting in 1899, the French gave land commissions in the French Congo to 39 companies. The companies had to pay royalties to France and their main objective was the collection of rubber and ivory. One concessionary company called the "La Mpoko" was founded on July 10, 1899 with the intention of exploiting a concession that covered the basin of the Mpoko River and the other tributaries. Guilbrand Schiötz was appointed head of the company in Bimbo, in 1906 Gaston Guibet was appointed head. The chief of the Bouriki peoples came to Guibet with a complaint, armed company men were demanding more rubber in his village and committing violent crimes. In 1907 Guibet reported to the local judicial authorities the crimes committed by agents under La Mpoko. The agents would take women as hostages demanding certain rubber quotas and beat and kill many people for no apparent reason. Agents stationed there would often rape women while the men were away at work. Schiötz resigned and left Africa in 1907 right as Guibet began to start an investigation. The French Congo high commissioner Èmile Gentil asked Paris to shut La Mpoko down but was rejected and the minister in Paris claimed that legal procedures against the company's clients had to be completed first. On April 29, 1909 a persecutor in Brazzaville gave a verdict that relieved the company and clients of their crimes. Due to its bad reputation the La Mpoko concession was revoked in 1910 and the company was liquidated in February 1911.

A whaling boat carrying 300+ people to the funeral of village chief capsized on the banks of the Mpoko River on 19 April 2024 due to the overcapacity and the boat's poor condition.

== Turbidity ==
The Mpoko river was found to have high TSM levels (total suspended matter), around 78.0 mg ^{L−1} contrasting from the low levels ranging around 0.7–16.0 mg L^{−1} from more rainforest dominated rivers. TSM levels depict how clear the water is in a river. Due to the surrounding savanna ecosystem, the water quality of the Mpoko River is highly turbid and not recommended for drinking.
