= Sinking of MV Spice Islander I =

Maritime disaster in Tanzania

Coordinates: 5°39′36″S 39°19′12″E

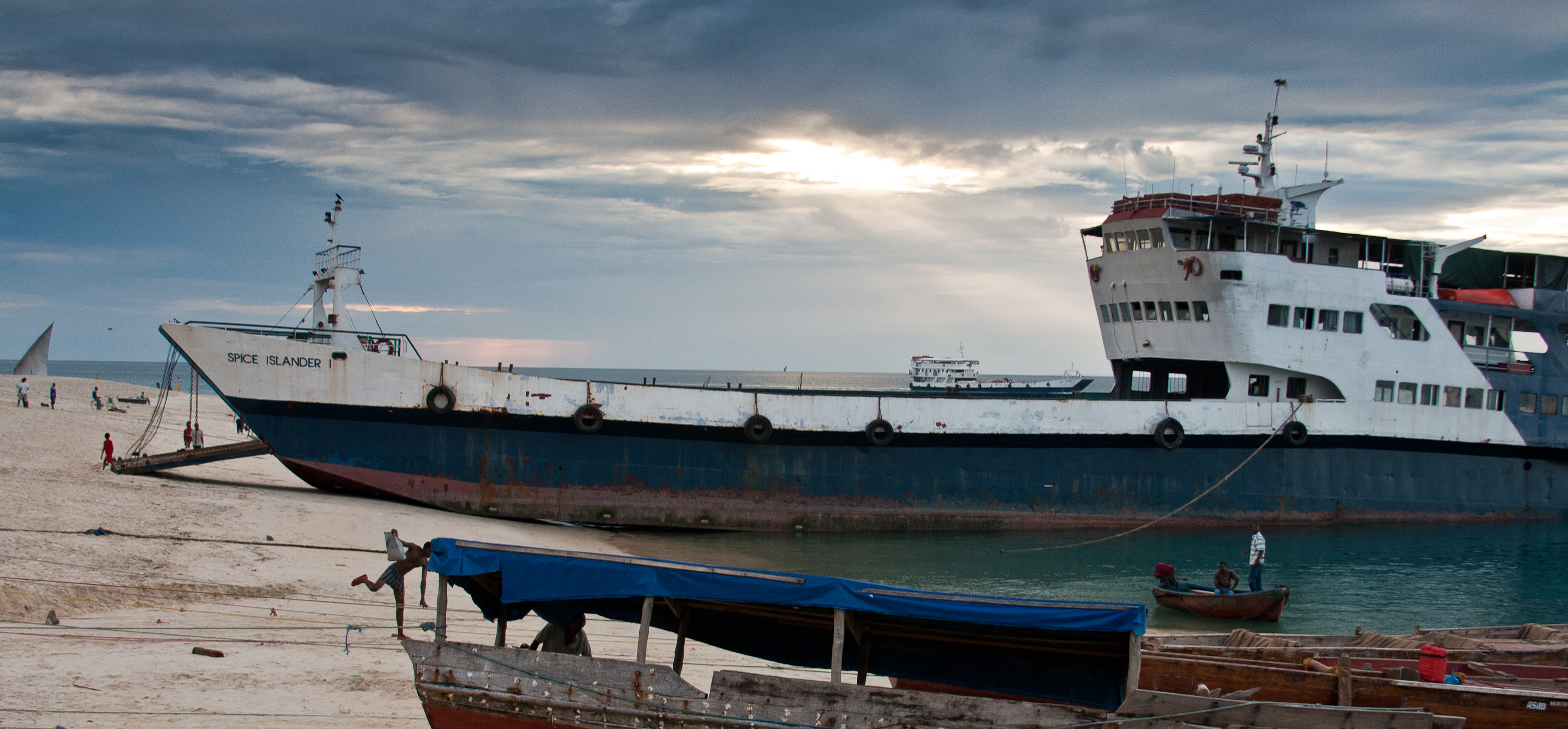
- Spice Islander I anchored in Zanzibar in 2010
- Date: September 10, 2011
- Time: c. 9:00 PM (EAT)
- Duration: c. 4 hours
- Location: Zanzibar Channel, Indian Ocean
- Type: Capsizing
- Cause: Overloading
- Participants: At least 800 on board
- Deaths: Between 200 and 1,500+
- Exact figures regarding the number of participants involved and their outcomes are unclear, with various conflicting reports on the numbers.

On 10 September 2011, Spice Islander I, a passenger ferry, reportedly carrying over 2,000 passengers, sank off the coast of Zanzibar. The ferry was travelling between Unguja and Pemba, two islands off the coast of mainland Tanzania, when it capsized. Early estimates put the death toll at around 200, but a report published by the Tanzanian government in January 2012 claimed that over 1,500 people had been killed.

== Incident ==
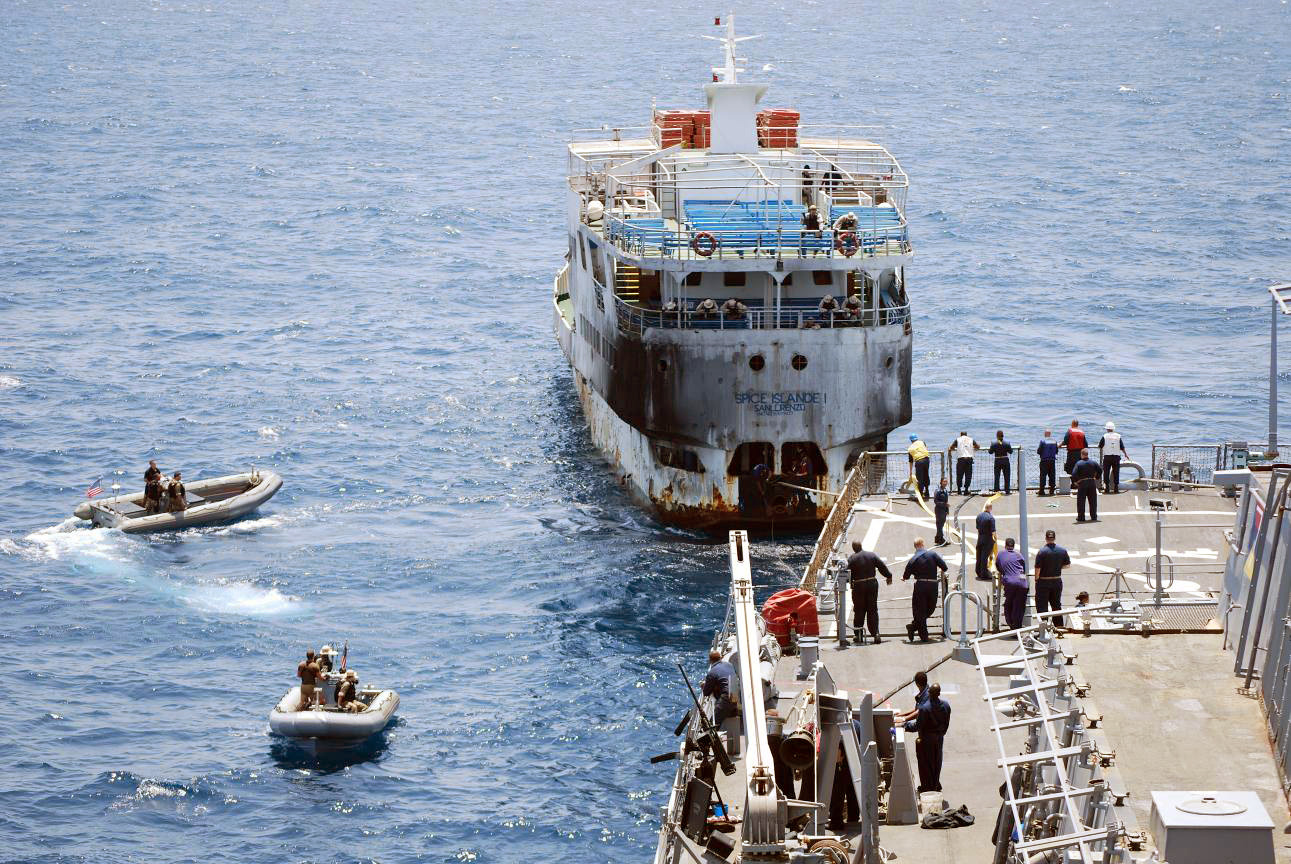
Spice Islander I, the ship involved in the accident

At 21:00 local time (19:00 UTC), MV Spice Islander I sailed from Unguja, the main island of the Zanzibar archipelago, for Pemba Island to the north. The ship's official capacity was 45 crew and 645 passengers, but it was reported to be heavily overloaded. Around four hours after departure, Spice Islander I sank between Zanzibar and Pemba. The ship is thought to have capsized after losing engine power. Of those on board, around 620 were rescued, with at least 40 of them suffering serious injuries. In addition to passengers, the ferry was believed to have been transporting cargo such as rice.

=== Death toll ===
Map showing Zanzibar Archipelago, the location of the disaster

Early news reports claimed that the ferry was carrying an estimated 800 people at the time of her sinking, and by 12 September, it was reported that over 240 bodies had been recovered. However, on 14 October, the Tanzanian government confirmed that the vessel had in fact been carrying around 3,586 passengers, of whom 2,764 were unaccounted for. In an investigative report published on 19 January 2012, these figures were revised downward, with 2,470 passengers, 203 confirmed dead, and 1,370 missing.

== Response ==
The Revolutionary Government of Zanzibar set up a center for people involved in the tragedy and called upon reserves from Zanzibar to join the effort. It also called for foreign support from African countries. The survivors were rescued by ferries and brought back to Zanzibar's main harbour, in Stone Town.

On 11 September, three days of mourning began for those who died in the incident. An investigation into the sinking was also announced; the Zanzibar minister of state, Mohamed Aboud Mohamed said: "The government will take stern measures against those found responsible for this tragedy, in accordance with the country's laws and regulations."

Eight months later, the MV Skagit, another ferry, between Dar es Salaam and Zanzibar, also sank, also with large loss of life.

== See also ==
- List of shipwrecks in 2011
- MV Bukoba, a Tanzanian ferry which sank in 1996, also with great loss of life
- Likoni Ferry, which suffered a similar disaster in 1994, in nearby Mombasa
