= Korovou =

- Village
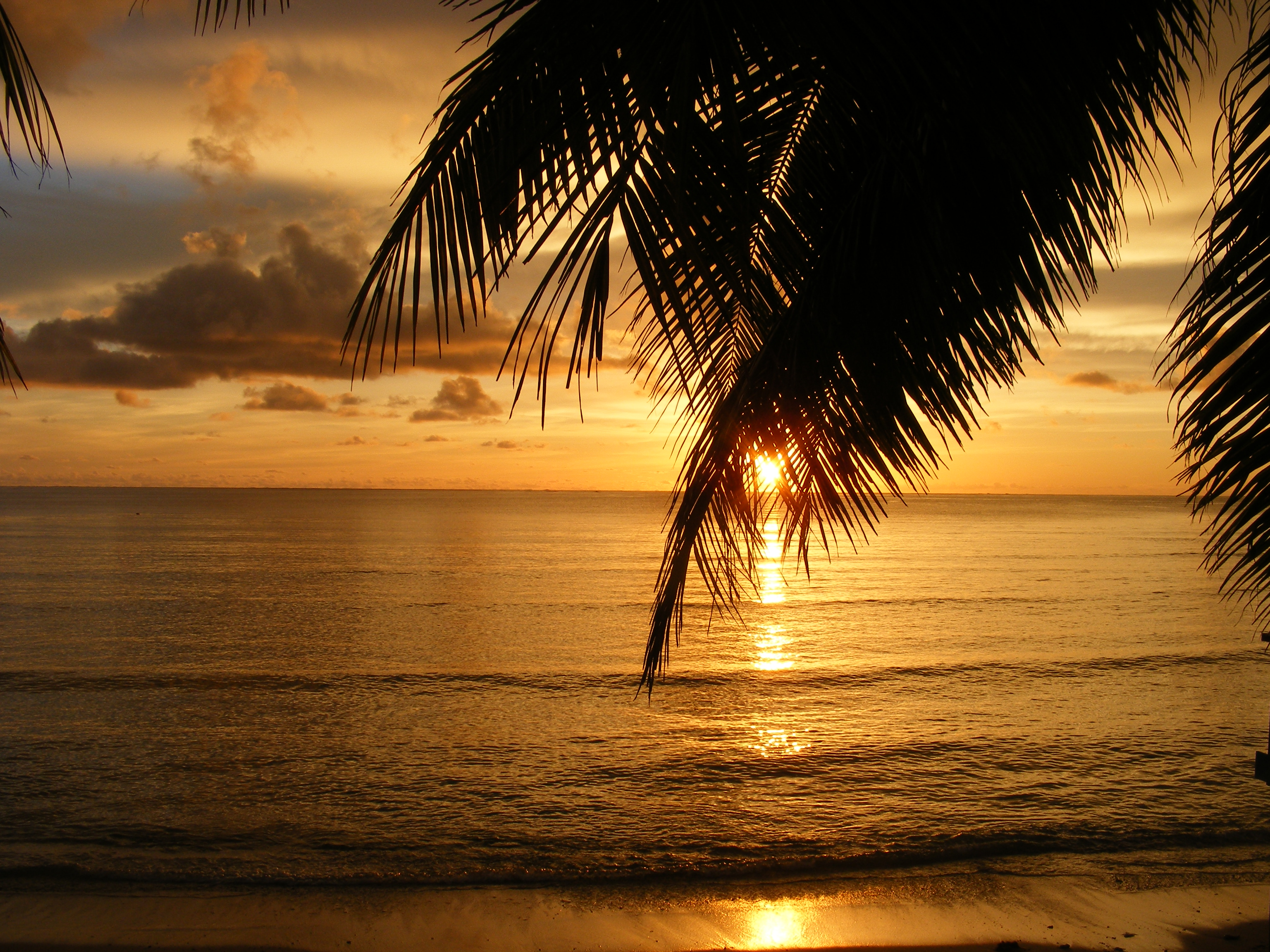

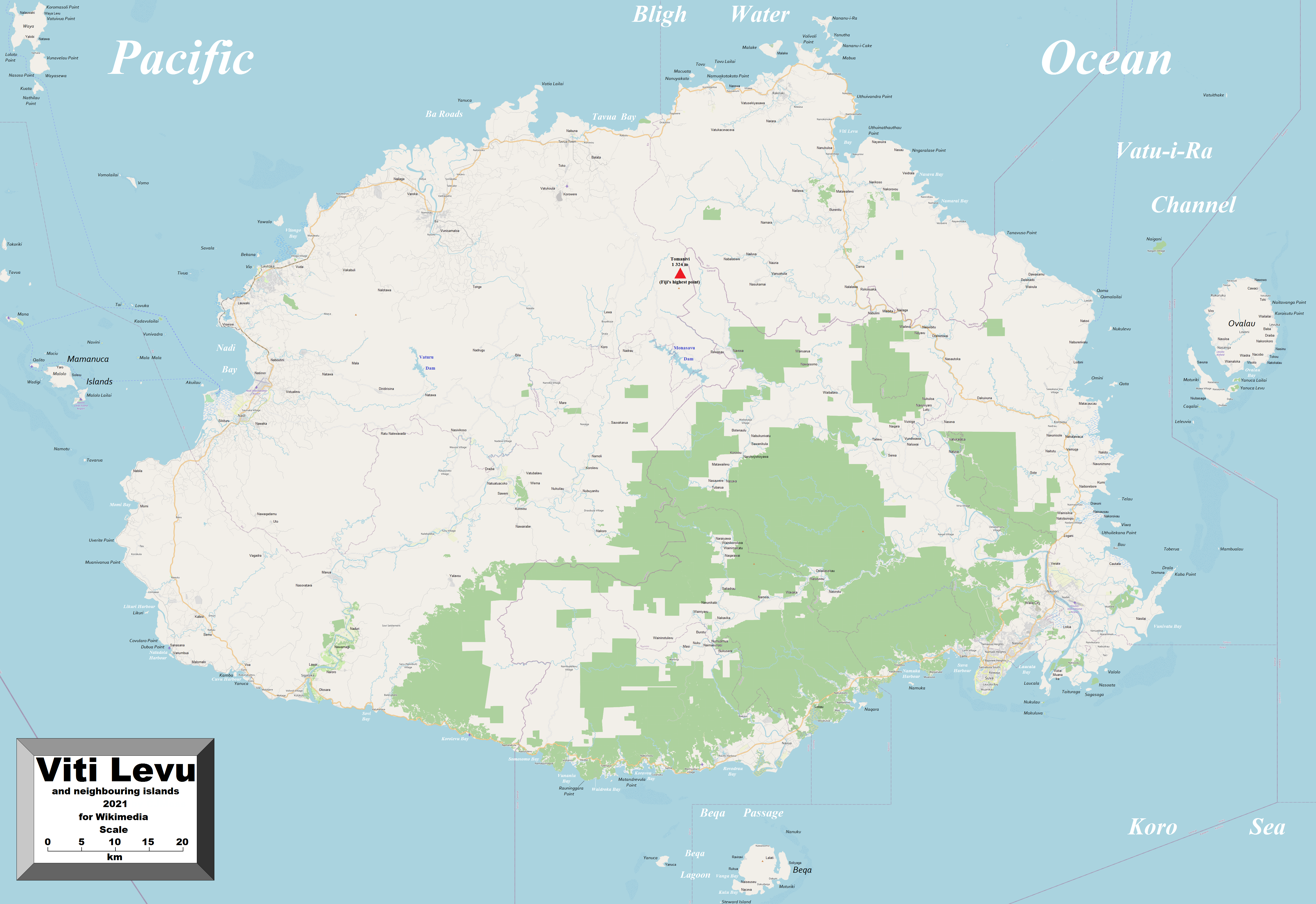
- Viti Levu with Korovou at the east coast

- Location in Fiji
- Country: Fiji
- Island: Viti Levu
- Division: Central Division
- Province: Tailevu
- Time zone: UTC+12

Korovou (Fijian pronunciation: [koroβɔu̯], literally "New Village") is a village in the Fijian Tailevu Province, 31 km from Nausori. It is considered the centre of Fiji's dairy industry, which was established at the end of the First World War by British settlers, on land donated by Fijian chiefs.

Descendants of the original settlers still operate a few of Korovou's dairy farms. Others emigrated in the late 1960s and sold their land to Indo-Fijian investors, angering local chief who claimed that land given by Fijian people should be returned to them. A compromise was eventually worked out, whereby the former landowners would have the first option to purchase any farm coming up for sale.

During the Fiji coup of 2000, supporters of insurrectionist George Speight stormed the local police station, taking 30 hostages.

Near Korovou lies Natovi Landing, a port used by ferries to Ovalau and Vanua Levu.
