= Sinking of Kim Nirvana-B =

2015 maritime incident in the Philippines

- Date: 2 July 2015
- Time: ~12:10 p.m. (PST)
- Location: 200 meters (660 ft) off Ormoc, Leyte, Philippines
- Deaths: 62
- Inquest: Coast Guard and National Police
- Accused: Ferry owner, captain, and 17 crew

The sinking of Kim Nirvana-B occurred on the morning of 2 July 2015, en route from Ormoc to Pilar in Ponson Island, among the Camotes Islands. It was reported that the ship, a motorized bangka, was overloaded with passengers and cargo that led to it capsizing after making a sharp turn.

Kim Nirvana-B was rated to carry 178 passengers and 16 crew members, but had at least 220 people on board at the time of the accident. Witnesses also reported that a large number of sacks of cement, rice and fertilizer were in the cargo area of the ship. Multiple murder charges were laid against the ferry's owner, captain and 17 crew members following the accident.

In July 2015, the Maritime Industry Authority reported that calculations show overloading was not the cause of the ship's sinking and instead cited the "negligent operations of the captain".

== See also ==
- List of maritime disasters in the Philippines
- List of maritime disasters in the 21st century
