= 2021 Congo River disaster =

Ship sinking

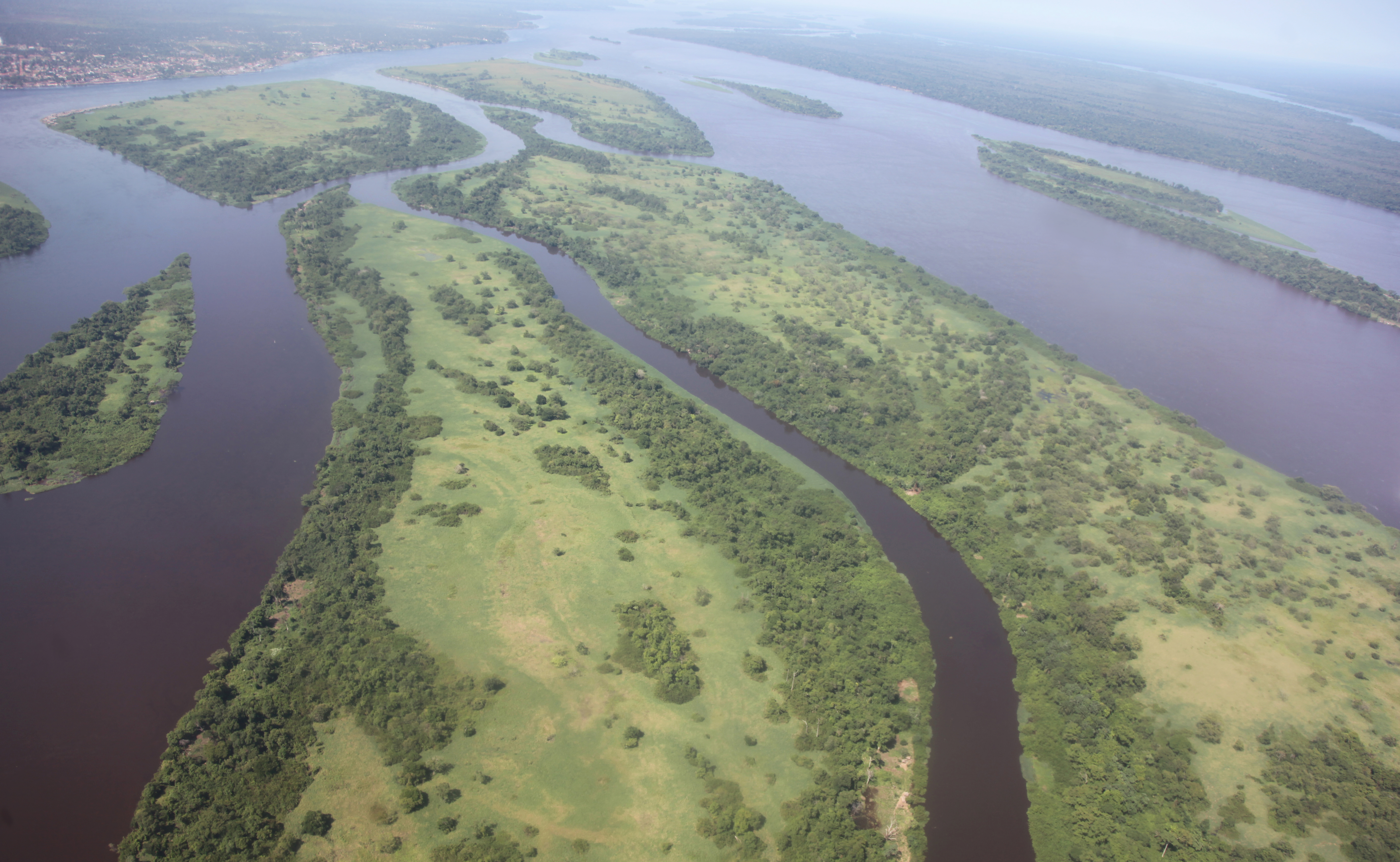
- Congo River
- Date: 15 February 2021
- Location: Democratic Republic of the Congo
- Type: Ship sunk
- Deaths: 60+
- Missing: 200+

On 15 February 2021, a ship sank in the Congo River in Mai-Ndombe province, near Kinshasa in the Democratic Republic of the Congo killing at least 60 people.

== Events ==
An overloaded barge sank at around 20:00 local time near the village of Longola Ekoti in the province of Mai-Ndombe. The boat was travelling 700 km along the Congo River, from Kinshasa to Mbandaka City, and over 700 people were on board. Only 300 people survived, while 60 were killed and the remaining passengers were unaccounted for.

Minister for Humanitarian Actions Steve Mbikayi Mabuluki told Al-Jazeera that the primary reason for the incident was that the vessel had too many passengers and too much cargo on board. He told the media that "night navigation also played a role” – something that is prohibited in the DRC. Meanwhile, according to locals, the boat hit a rock.

In the days that followed, Mbikayi offered condolences to the families affected while also calling for sanctions against the transport companies involved. President Félix Tshisekedi subsequently announced that life jackets were mandatory for all passengers.

The event coincided with the appointment of the new Prime Minister Jean-Michel Sama Lukonde.

== See also ==
- 2024 Bangui river disaster
