= International Year of Cooperatives =

2012 was designated as the International Year of Cooperatives by the United Nations General Assembly on 18 December 2009.

The designation has honored the use of cooperative organizations to contribute to socio-economic development across the world. It officially launched on 31 October 2011 with the theme "Cooperative Enterprises Build a Better World". United Nations Secretary-General Ban Ki-moon was invited to speak at the November 2011 summit of the International Cooperative Alliance to celebrate the designation.

2025 was designated as the second International Year of Cooperatives by the United Nations General Assembly on June 19, 2024, with the theme “Cooperatives Build a Better World.”
