= MV Princess Ashika =

Tongan inter-island ferry which sank in 2009

Coordinates: 20°24′S 174°56′W

- Princess Ashika pierside at Natovi Landing on 31 August 2008

History
- Name: Olive Maru No. 1
- Builder: Shikoku Dockyard, Takamatsu, Japan
- Yard number: 757
- Laid down: June 1972
- Completed: 27 September 1972
- Identification: IMO number: 7234002

- Name: Princess Ashika
- Owner: North West Shipping (1985–1989); Patterson Brothers Shipping Company (1989–2009)
- Christened: 1985

- Name: Princess Ashika
- Owner: Shipping Corporation of Polynesia Ltd
- In service: 7 July 2009
- Identification: Call sign 3DSD
- Fate: Sank 5 August 2009

General characteristics
- Type: Ferry (RORO)
- Tonnage: 690 GT; 223 DWT
- Length: 50.5 m (165 ft 8 in)
- Beam: 13.2 m (43 ft 4 in)
- Crew: 30
- Princess Ashika sank approximately 86 km northeast of Nukuʻalofa.

MV Princess Ashika was an inter-island ferry which operated in the South Pacific kingdom of Tonga. This motorised vessel (MV) was built in 1972, and began sailing the Tongan route on 7 July 2009 only to sink less than a month later on 5 August. Official figures released by Operation Ashika on 19 August 2009, confirmed that 54 men were rescued, and 74 people were lost at sea. These include two bodies recovered and 72 missing (68 passengers and 4 crew), including five foreign nationals. Two of the missing passengers remain unidentified.

Tonga's transportation minister, Paul Karalus, resigned six days after the tragedy. The ship was replaced in October 2010 by the MV ‘Otuanga’ofa, which after a period of testing, entered service in December 2010.

== History ==
The ferry was laid down in June 1972 and completed on 27 September 1972 at the Shikoku Dockyard in Takamatsu, Japan, and was named MV Olive Maru No. 1. In 1985, she was renamed MV Princess Ashika after the only daughter of a Fijian operator named Raj Naidu who operated a shipping company named North West Shipping and who imported the ship to Fiji in 1985 from Nagasaki, Japan. In 1989 and after the initial coup era in Fiji, Mr Naidu sold the ship to the Patterson Brothers Shipping Company who continued to operate this ship for the following 20 years prior to it being sold to the Tongan government. Due to concerns by the Tongan government over the physical status and safety of the existing inter-island ferry, the MV Olovaha, the Princess Ashika was ordered from Fiji to replace the Olovaha at which time it was purchased by Shipping Corporation of Polynesia Ltd. The use of the Princess Ashika was intended to be a stop-gap measure until a new boat funded by a NZD$35 million grant from Japan was to replace it in 2011. Shipping Corporation of Polynesia Ltd had stated less than two months before the disaster that the ship was in "good" condition and that it had been well maintained.

=== Sinking ===
The ferry was travelling from the capital of Tonga, Nukuʻalofa, to Ha'afeva when it sent out a mayday call just before 2300 hours on 5 August 2009, followed by a distress beacon. The distress beacon was sent five minutes after the mayday call. One survivor described a "big wave" and "much water", claiming that it had happened very quickly. When it sank, the ferry had only made five voyages in its new role.

A P-3 Orion plane from the Royal New Zealand Air Force located a trail of wreckage 86 kilometres (53 mi) northeast of Nukuʻalofa. When darkness fell, search boats ceased searching for fear of sailing over survivors in the water.

Due to the possibility that stowaways may have been onboard it is impossible to confirm a precise number of passengers. One 48-year-old British national was killed, according to the Foreign & Commonwealth Office. He was resident in New Zealand at the time of his death. There were said to be around ten Europeans on board the ferry.

An ROV operated from HMNZS Manawanui returned photos of the wreck on 18 August 2009.

=== Unseaworthiness ===
John Jonesse, managing director of the Shipping Corporation of Polynesia Ltd. inspected the ship in Fiji before it was brought to Tonga. Princess Ashika was inspected by government surveyors and approved for inter-island ferry services. However, one surveyor who inspected the vessel found that it was unseaworthy.

After the sinking of the vessel on its first domestic service, Captain Maka Tuputupu admitted that he had been pressured by the government to go to sea without delaying the voyage to conduct necessary repairs. The Tongan port chief also stated in a letter to the Prime Minister that the vessel was not seaworthy even though the former ship owner stated that it was "still in running condition." The captain stated that the ship sank in less than one metre swell while others confirmed serious problems with the vessel.

In November 2009, the purchasing committee set up to advise the Government on whether it should purchase large assets, said money had already changed hands by the time it was asked if the ferry should be bought.

=== Reaction to sinking ===
- New Zealand Prime Minister John Key spoke of his concern during the Pacific Islands Forum which was occurring in Cairns, Australia at the same time. New Zealand Minister of Foreign Affairs Murray McCully said he was "deeply concerned" and compared it to a preceding sinking in Kiribati. The country may offer ferry services.
- A communiqué issued by the French Ministry of Foreign and European Affairs stated that France was "extremely shocked" to hear of the sinking, and extended sincere condolences to the families and friends of the victims.

=== Royal Commission of Enquiry ===
Hearings of the Royal Commission of enquiry started in October 2009; the commission was presided by Tongan Supreme Court Justice Warwick Andrew. The Royal Commission was required to enquire and report upon :

1. The facts about the disaster and the accompanying search, rescue and recovery of the disaster victims;
2. The cause of the disaster;
3. Evidence leading to any criminal act contributing to the disaster;
4. Evidence leading to any civil responsibility for the disaster;
5. The reasons why the loss of lives attained such magnitude;
6. Present proposals for any measures that would help to prevent the future occurrence of a similar disaster, or may assist in future search, rescue and recovery of disaster victims.

At an early hearing of the Royal Commission, former general manager and Director of SCP, marine engineer Mosese Fakatou, presented 37 slides showing holes and heavy corrosion in the sides and floor of Princess Ashika. Mr Fakatou had been instructed by P&I insurers British Marine to conduct a Loss Prevention Survey, however, delays in carrying out the survey meant that the survey was written up on 6 and 7 August, after the vessel had sunk.

The inquiry later found that Princess Ashika had not been surveyed prior to being purchased by the Tongan government and that unfavourable surveys by the Fiji Marine Board were not brought to the attention of the Tongan authorities. A survey was conducted by Tongan Ministry of Transport surveyors on arrival of the vessel in Tonga, however, despite their subsequent claims that they considered the vessel to be totally unseaworthy, they failed to stop operations of the vessel.

== See also ==
- 2009 Kiribati ferry accident
- List of maritime disasters
