= 2009 Kiribati ferry accident =

Maritime incident in Kiribati

The 2009 Kiribati ferry accident was the sinking, on 13 July 2009, of an inter-island ferry in the south Pacific nation of Kiribati. The accident is believed to have killed 33 of the ship's 55 passengers and crew.

The ferry was a 56-foot-long (17 m) double-hulled wood catamaran en route between Tarawa and the outlying island of Maiana. It capsized when the captain attempted to turn around to rescue a crew member who had been swept overboard in high seas. The Royal New Zealand Air Force sent a C130 aircraft to aid in air-sea rescue and recovery operations; it aided in recovering twenty survivors, and seven bodies, before calling off the search. A further eighteen bodies were not recovered.

== See also ==
- MV Princess Ashika, a ferry which capsized in Tonga a month later
- List of maritime disasters
- MV Butiraoi, an I-Kiribati ferry travelling between Nonouti and Betio which sank in January 2018.
