= Spice Islander I =

Ferry that sank off Zanzibar in 2011

Coordinates: 5°39′23″S 39°28′27″E

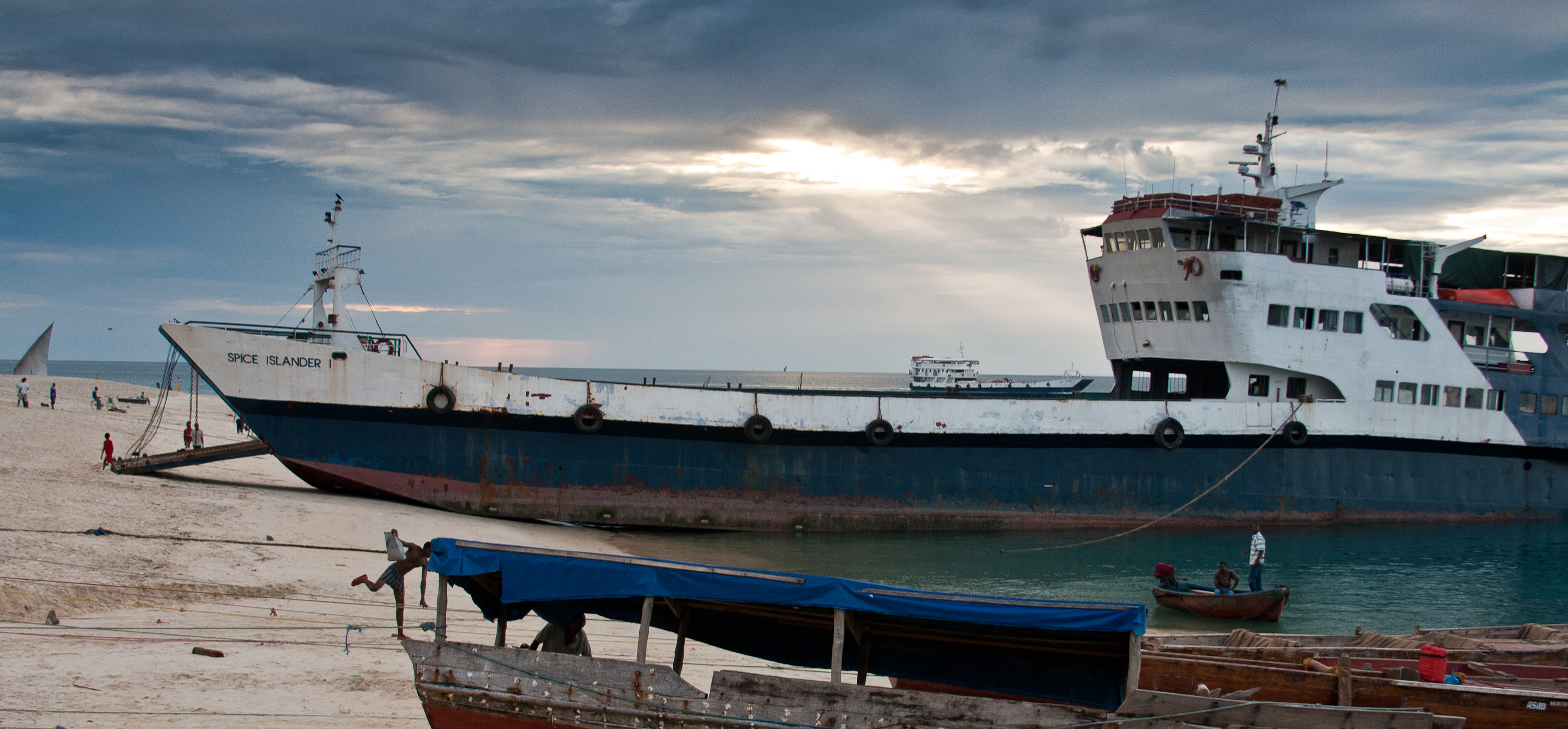
- Spice Islander I in Stone Town 2010

History
- Name: Marianna (1967–1988); Apostolos P (1988–2007); Spice Islander I (2007–2011)
- Owner: Thelogos P Naftiliaki (−1988); Apostolos Shipping (1988–1999); Saronikos Ferries (1999–2005); Hellenic Seaways (2005–2007); Makame Hasnuu (2007–2011)
- Port of registry: Piraeus, Greece (1967–2007); San Lorenzo, Honduras (2007– ); Zanzibar, Tanzania ( –2011)
- Way number: 456
- Launched: 1967
- Completed: 1967
- Out of service: 10 September 2011 (sank)
- Identification: IMO number: 8329907; Call sign HQWZ7
- Fate: Sank

General characteristics
- Class & type: Marry
- Tonnage: 836 GRT; 663 NRT; 225 DWT
- Length: 60.00 metres (196.85 ft)
- Beam: 11.40 metres (37.4 ft)
- Installed power: 2 Poyaud 12VUD25 diesel engines
- Propulsion: Screw propeller
- Capacity: 645 passengers
- Crew: 45 crew

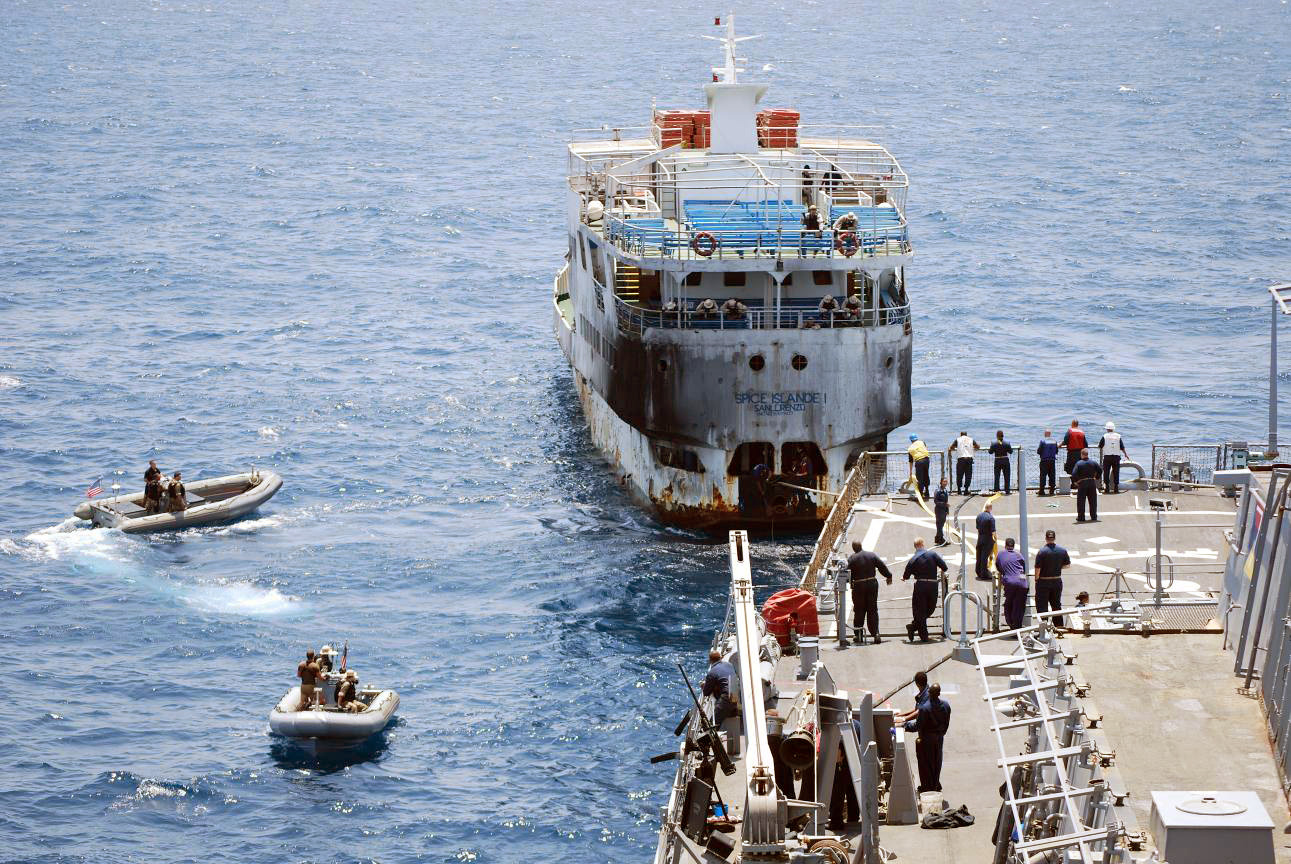
Spice Islander I under tow by USS Stout in 2007

Spice Islander I was a 836 GRT Ro-Ro ferry which was built in Greece in 1967 as Marianna. She was renamed Apostolos P following a sale in 1988. She was sold to a Honduran company in 2007 and renamed Spice Islander I. On 10 September 2011, she sank, resulting in the deaths of 1,573 people, many of whom were never recovered.

== Description ==
The ship was 60.00 metres (196.85 ft) long, with a beam of 11.40 metres (37.4 ft). She was assessed at 836 GRT, 663 NRT, 225 DWT. The ship was propelled by two Poyaud 12VUD25 diesel engines, of 1,560 horsepower (1,160 kW).

== History ==
Built in 1967 as Marianna for an unknown owner, she was later sold to Theologos P. Naftiliaki of Piraeus, Greece. In 1988, Marianna was sold to Apostolos Shipping and renamed Apostolos P. She was later sold to Saronikos Ferries and placed in service on the Piraeus – Aegina – Agistri route.

In 2005, Apostolos P was registered to Hellenic Seaways. In 2007, she was sold to Makame Hasnuu of Zanzibar, Tanzania, and renamed Spice Islander I.

On 25 September 2007, Spice Islander I was off the coast of Somalia when she experienced engine problems due to contaminated fuel. After the alarm had been raised via Kenya, USS Stout from Combined Task Force 150 was sent to her aid. The ship was on a voyage from Oman to Tanzania and was not carrying any passengers. USS James E. Williams also responded. Stout provided the ship with 7,800 US gallons (30,000 L; 6,500 imp gal) of fuel and supplied the ten crew with food and water. After her engines were restarted, she resumed her voyage to Tanzania.

== Loss ==
At 21:00 local time (19:00 UTC) on 9 September 2011, Spice Islander I set sail from Unguja for Pemba Island. She was reported to have been carrying an excess of 800 passengers. Her capacity was 45 crew and 654 passengers. At around 01:00, (local time) on 10 September (23:00, 9 September UTC) Spice Islander I sank between Zanzibar and Pemba. Of those on board, 620 were rescued. Only 240 bodies were recovered, and the death toll was placed at 2,976; however, this estimate was revised downward in January 2012 to 1,573.
