= 2009 Sierra Leone ferry accident =

Maritime disaster in Sierra Leone

Coordinates: 7°56′06″N 12°58′12″W

The accident occurred off the coast of Sierra Leone (pictured).

The 2009 Sierra Leone ferry accident occurred on 8 September 2009 off the coast of Sierra Leone, when a wooden Teh Teh ferry travelling from Shenge village to Tombo sank during a storm. At least 90 people to date have been confirmed dead, and over 100 others have been listed as "missing". So far, only 39 survivors have been rescued. Several of the passengers were children who had been on holiday, though the official passenger manifest did not include them. An attempted rescue operation ended on 11 September. The sinking is the worst such accident in Sierra Leone since 2002, when a boatful of refugees capsized. The Xinhua News Agency in China has likened the disaster to other major marine accidents in recent years.

Sierra Leone's police initially indicated there were only 150 people on the ferry when it sank; however, it has since been determined that there were far more aboard. There were actually about 200 passengers who had booked passage on the stricken boat; moreover, the captain allowed extra passengers to board, placing the true figure in doubt. Sierra Leone's transport ministry has suggested there may have been 300 people on board.

== Rescue ==
A survivor alerted authorities to the incident after arriving onshore aboard a 20-litre plastic container. After launching a rescue mission, the initial search party found the ferry afloat. Relatives of those on board flocked to Tombo to hear what had happened to their loved ones, with several "bitterly criticis(ing)" the lengthy delays at rescue attempts. Musu Conteh, whose child went missing in the shipwreck, claimed a search did not get underway for 10 hours. Several of the rescued were described as being in "serious condition". One of the survivors, Alimamy Bangura, said the ferry had been "tossed around like a piece of paper". Another survivor, Sam Kelfala, said "the heavy weight of drums of palm oil and other goods trapped many of the people".

The 90 corpses which were recovered were all buried. Thirty of them were unrecognisable and were placed in a mass grave. Attempts have been made to recover more corpses from the sea.

Further survivors were not expected to be found due to sea turbulence and currents, which would have hampered efforts to swim ashore. However, search-and-rescue efforts persisted for several days, with local fishermen assisting the navy. Many corpses have been washed up on the shoreline. 120 bodies were buried on 12 September 2009.

== Cause ==
Severe weather and overloading have been blamed for the sinking. The boat did not carry lifejackets, and was built to hold only sixty passengers. Edible palm oil was also being carried on board, as well as kolanuts and rice bags. The captain, Thaim Bundu, was said to have "ignored warnings" about dangerous conditions. One survivor, an Alfred Smith, said Bundu was "wholly responsible", while another survivor, Bintu Sinneh, claimed the captain was arrogant in the face of concerns from passengers. Bundu perished in the sinking.

== Reaction ==
Sierra Leone's President, Ernest Bai Koroma, was said to be "very sad" in the wake of the tragedy. Ibrahim Ben Kargbo, Sierra Leone's Information Minister, said the shipwreck would be "thoroughly investigated". International assistance has been offered.
