= Al-Baraqua II =

Ferry sinking in Djibouti

Coordinates: 11°36′N 43°08′E

History
- Name: Al-Baraqua II
- Fate: Sunk off Djibouti City

General characteristics
- Type: Ferry

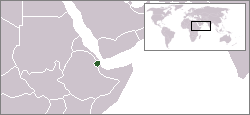
Location of Djibouti.

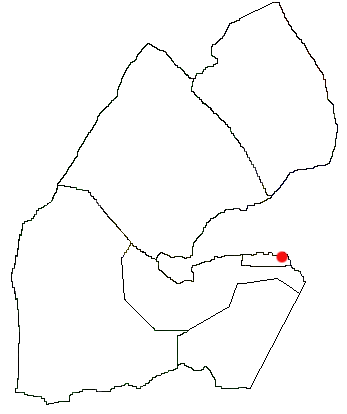
Location of Djibouti City, Djibouti

The al-Baraqua II was a ferry which capsized on April 6, 2006, in the Gulf of Tadjoura off the coast of Djibouti's capital of Djibouti City. The ferry was carrying passengers from the capital to a religious festival in Tadjoura when the accident occurred, shortly after departure. As of April 11, the death toll stood at 113 with many still missing.

Djibouti president Ismail Omar Guelleh ordered an investigation into the sinking. Early reports suggest the ferry may have been overcrowded. About 200 people were believed to be on board the ferry when she capsized.
