= Cheeki Rafiki =

Sailing yacht

History

United Kingdom
- Name: Cheeki Rafiki
- Owner: Fast Sailing Ltd
- Operator: Stormforce Coaching
- Port of registry: (United Kingdom of Great Britain and Ireland) Shoreham-by-Sea, UK
- Route: Antigua to Southampton
- Ordered: 2006
- Builder: Bénéteau
- Launched: December 2006
- In service: December 2006 - May 2014
- Fate: Capsized 16 May 2014; Sank on or after 20 May 2014

General characteristics
- Class & type: Sailing yacht Bénéteau First 40.7
- Tonnage: approx 15.54 gross (est.)
- Length: 11.92 m
- Beam: 3.78 m
- Draught: 2.4 m
- Decks: 1
- Propulsion: 1 Diesel Engine
- Sail plan: Sloop, sail area 74.89 m^{2}
- Capacity: 12

Cheeki Rafiki was a Bénéteau First 40.7 sailing yacht. The yacht lost her keel in the Atlantic Ocean about 720 nautical miles (1,330 km; 830 mi) southeast of Nova Scotia, Canada, and subsequently capsized. Rescue services found her upturned hull before it sank but the crew – four English men – were never found. Her sinking on May 16, 2014 resulted in an extended debate over the safety of modern sailing boats.

== The yacht ==
Cheeki Rafiki was a Bénéteau First 40.7, which had been built in 2006 at Bénéteau's shipyard in Saint-Hilaire-de-Riez, France. She had been delivered to the customer in December 2006, who planned to enter her in charter regattas around Great Britain. In 2011, Stormforce Coaching took over the management of the yacht, but not her ownership. Subsequently, they entered the yacht twice into the Atlantic Rally for Cruisers (ARC), in 2011 and 2013. After each of these crossings, she stayed in the Caribbean Sea for a few months. The disaster happened during the journey home in early 2014.

Central to the later investigation was the construction of the hull and especially the link between the hull and the so-called "matrix", an inner layer that was embedded in the lower part of the hull to give it the necessary stability and stiffness. The keel was secured to the hull by ten bolts; nine of them 24mm in diameter and one 14mm. They were laminated into the keel, and put through the outer hull, the matrix, and a steel washer, and then secured with nuts. The building process and the construction fulfilled the CE-seaworthiness Classification of category A (ocean), in the version valid at the time of building. Additionally, the construction process had been surveyed by Bureau Veritas.

== The accident ==
Last known position of the Cheeki Rafiki

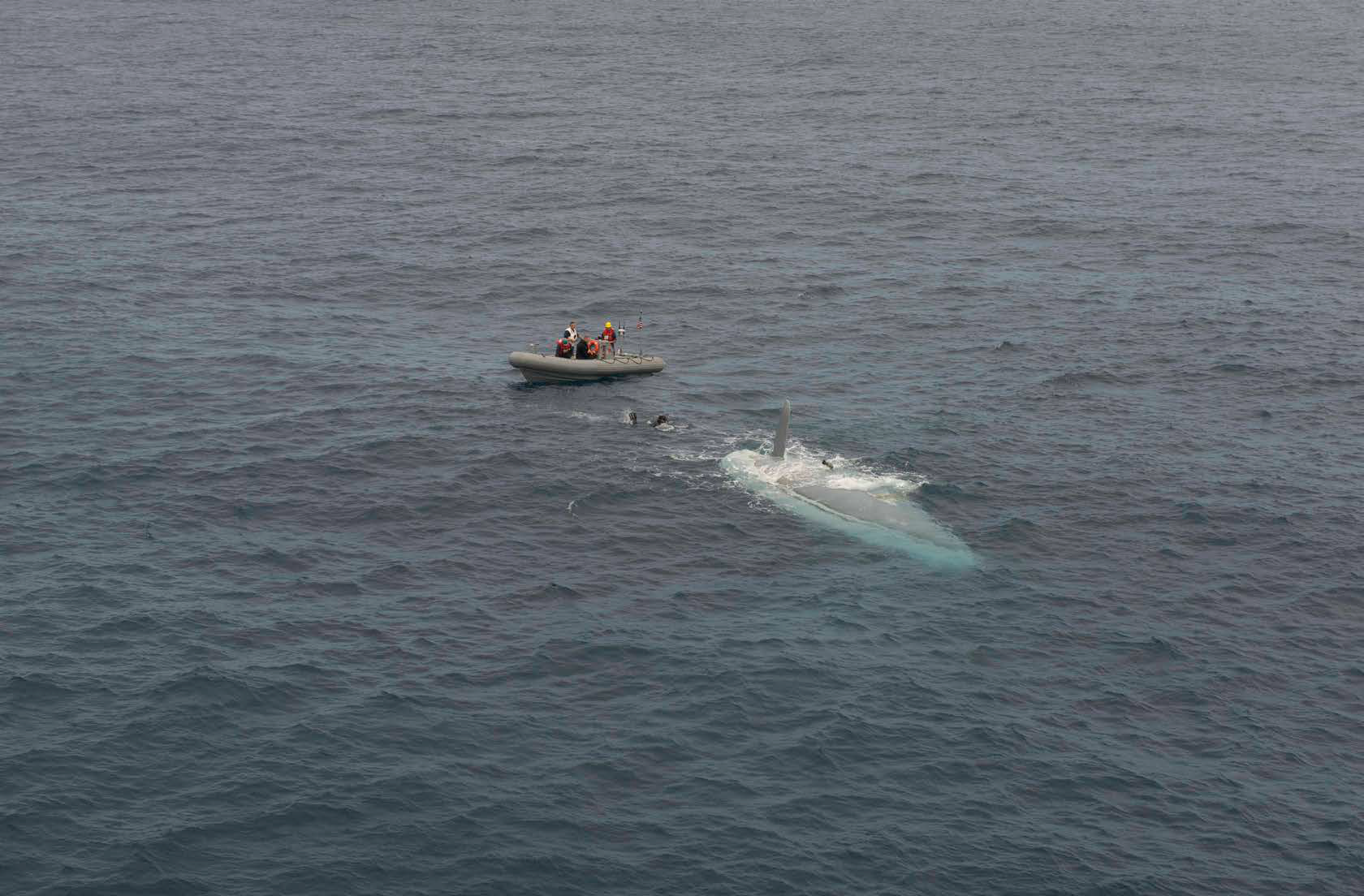
USS Oscar Austin sends a diver to the upturned hull of Cheeki Rafiki

Cheeki Rafiki had participated in the Antigua Sailing Week event in spring 2014 and was supposed to return to Southampton, England afterwards, to be available as charter yacht the following season. She left Antigua on May, 4 with a crew of four men on board. The voyage was expected to take about 30 days. During the voyage, the skipper exchanged emails with the director of Stormforce over satellite phone, especially about route suggestions and weather reports. Initially, there was not much wind, but it was constantly increasing after May 10. On May 16, the wind blew with Force 7 and a considerable sea had built up. The skipper reported to shore that the ship was taking on significant amounts of water for no apparent reason. A later phone call was incomprehensible, such that the director called MRCC Falmouth for help. A search-and-rescue operation was started. RCC Boston, responsible for the area in question, sent out a HC-130 Long Range Surveillance Aircraft. They were looking for a disabled yacht and persons in the water, since two PLB devices had sent emergency signals. The aircraft crew identified only debris at the expected position.

On May 17, more than 24 hours after the last contact with the ship, the container vessel Maersk Kure identified Cheeki Rafiki's hull, upside-down. The keel was missing, but the rudder was still in place. Due to bad weather conditions, the wreck could not be investigated further. Only about one week later could a ship of the United States Navy send a diver to the still-floating wreck. This confirmed the life raft was still secured to its storage location; the crew had not had the time to bring it out. Consequently, the search was terminated, because any hope of finding the crew alive was in vain. The maximum time somebody can survive in water of 16 °C (61 °F) is about 15.5 hours.

== Investigation ==
The accident resulted in heated discussion amongst yachtsmen over the safety of sailboats and particularly over the construction and dimensioning of the connection between keel and hull, which had obviously failed in this case, but is of utmost importance for a sailing vessel. There were speculations whether the shipyard had fallen below the margins for required hull stability to cut costs as a measure to win customers in the highly competitive market for affordable yachts. The report of the British Marine Accident Investigation Branch showed that the construction did satisfy the relevant construction specifications available at the time of construction. It even almost passed the revised ones at the time of the accident.

Furthermore, the crew could also not be blamed for the accident, because they were competent and the skipper was in the possession of all required certificates for such a voyage. At the time of the accident, the wind blew with force 7, which is rough but still completely within the limits for which such boats are constructed. The accident investigation report points out though, that it's unclear whether the ship was even allowed to set to sea under applicable laws. This because, as a professionally skippered boat, there are extensive rules concerning equipment, crewing and yearly safety inspections. The latter was overdue, but the operator was intending to postpone the inspection until the boat was back in England, so that he could avoid the costs of having to fly an inspector to the Caribbean.

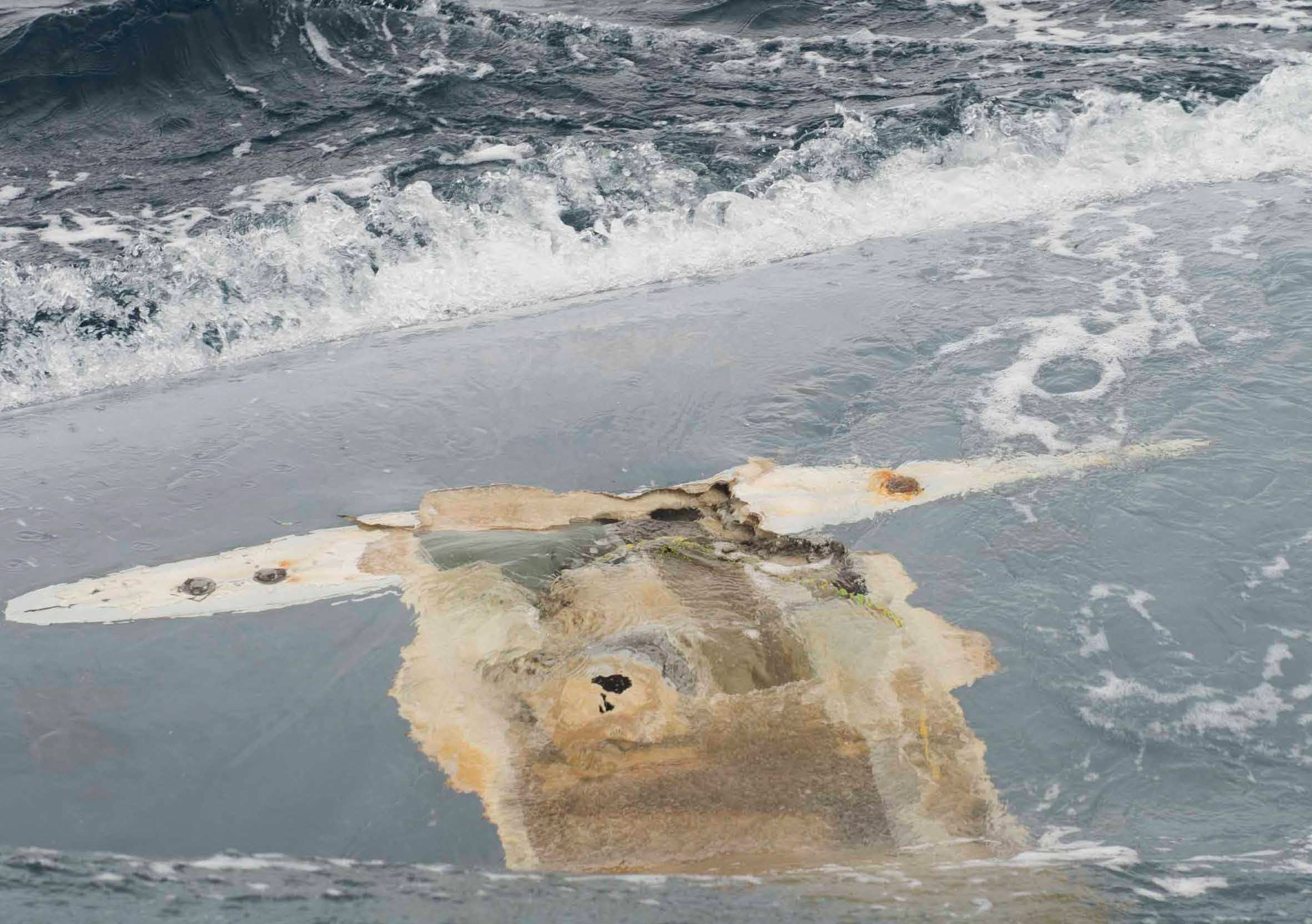
Close up picture of Cheeki Rafiki's hull, where the keel had been. It is visible that the inner hull has separated from the outer and that the bolts including the washers are completely missing.

The investigation report then tries to evaluate why the keel actually separated, even though technically, computationally and based on the weather at the place of incident there was no obvious reason for this. The wreck of the Cheeki Rafiki was not available for investigation, as it has not been found yet. So the MAIB had to find their conclusions from the few pictures of the rescue crews, the history of the boat and reports from sister ships. It was known that she had had a few groundings prior to the accident – experts investigated by the MAIB said that this was not uncommon for ships participating in races. The connection between hull, matrix and keel had been repaired several times already. Even experts are not normally capable of telling how such a repair would be properly done and how to tell that it was acceptably fixed. The recommendation from the manufacturer to remove the keel completely was considered best practice, its cost-effectiveness was questioned though.

The report concludes that the most probable cause for the accident was a failure of the glued link between the "matrix" (inner skeleton) and the outer hull. Similar damages could be observed in sister ships which were involved in groundings, too. Different repair yards said that they could only hardly determine the severity of such damages. Also, a skipper cannot easily determine whether a "light" grounding had caused any damage. The report states that "Almost all [yacht owners and professional yacht skippers asked] agreed that groundings can occur when racing, and that if, in their opinion, it was a ‘light’ grounding, no inspection for damage was necessary", while at the same time, there are several definitions for a "light grounding":

- a grounding where the vessel did not stop;
- where the vessel only ‘bounced’ over the bottom;
- where no person was knocked off their feet as a result of the grounding;
- where the vessel grounded at slow speed; and
- where the vessel grounded on a soft bottom e.g. sand.

It is assumed that the structural damages in the hull of Cheeki Rafiki had not been sufficiently repaired after the previous groundings, such that the stability of the glued hull was compromised. It couldn't withstand the force of the increasing waves. The pictures show that the layers of the hull had separated. Some bolts could also have failed due to corrosion.

The extensive report gives many recommendations for improvements. However, it does not ask for increased stability requirements for keel-to-hull constructions.

== Prosecution ==
Shortly after the report was published operating company Stormforce and its director Douglas Innes were charged, with Innes facing four counts of manslaughter by gross negligence. He was accused of insufficient maintenance to cut costs. The yacht was, according to the Crown Prosecution Service, not seaworthy for an ocean passage, as several bolts of the keel were corroded or broken even before the voyage: "A number of keel bolts had broken, causing it to detach from the hull. Many were broken and it had been like that for months. The yacht was therefore unsound, broken, and unsafe before the men left from Antigua." Innes pleaded not guilty.

The jury at Winchester Crown Court acquitted Innes of manslaughter, but they did find him and the company guilty of unsafe operation of the vessel and of failing to fulfill the requirements of the Merchant Shipping Act. On May 11, 2018 Innes received a suspended sentence whilst his bankrupt firm Stormforce was fined £50,000.

== Sources ==
- Report on the investigation of the loss of the yacht Cheeki Rafiki and its four crew in the Atlantic Ocean, approximately 720 miles east-south-east of Nova Scotia, Canada on 16 May 2014; Marine Accident Investigation Branch (MAIB) Report 8/2015 Report (PDF), with Annexes (PDF, english).
- Lessons from Losses At Sea: “Cheeki Rafiki” Report Misses An Opportunity to Make Boats Safer; Attainable Adventure Cruising; Juni 2016.
