= MV Butiraoi =

Kiribati ferry that sunk in 2018

MV Butiraoi, prior to sinking

Betio and Nonouti in relation to other islands of the South Pacific

The MV Butiraoi was a 17.5-metre (57 ft) wooden catamaran that operated as a ferry in Kiribati. On 18 January 2018, it left the island of Nonouti carrying 88 passengers. Bound for Betio, the ferry was planned to make the 240-kilometre (150 mi) voyage in two days. According to survivors, the overloaded ferry broke in half and sank.

The ferry was reported missing on the 19th. On 26 January, Kiribati notified authorities in Fiji and New Zealand who, along with multiple fishing vessels, searched the areas surrounding the ferry's planned path. Australia and the US joined in the aerial search in the days that followed. Two days later, a Royal New Zealand Air Force Orion patrol plane spotted a wooden dinghy containing seven passengers of the Butiraoi, who were then rescued by a nearby fishing vessel. The aerial search was called off on 1 February, with some fishing vessels continuing the search. No further passengers were found.

== Investigation ==
The ship's owner, Kirennang Tokiteba, in an interview with Michael Morrah, blamed the captain for running the ship aground a few days prior to the sinking, damaging the ship's propeller shaft. A survey done to assess the damage to the ship had found several problems with the ship, and stated that the ship was not to carry passengers. Tokiteba told Morrah that the captain defied those orders, boarding 88 people, including 5 crew members, despite the fact that during normal operations, the ship's maximum capacity was 69 passengers. The ship was also carrying 35-tonne (34-long-ton; 39-short-ton) of coconuts, well in excess of cargo limits.

The Kiribati maritime director was placed in charge of completing the official report, initially expected for late February to early March. However, on 14 March 2018, the Kiribati government asked for help from New Zealand, who sent over three investigators from the New Zealand Transport Accident Investigation Commission.

== Obstruction of foreign journalists ==
Following the sinking, the Kiribati government was criticised for purposefully obstructing foreign journalists who came to report on the incident. A team from the Australian Broadcasting Corporation was told by the Kiribati government they were not welcome and Newshub journalist Michael Morrah had his passport confiscated upon his arrival in the country. Morrah's team, after recording interviews with survivors, was interrogated by immigration officials and forced to delete the footage of the interview.

== See also ==
- 2009 Kiribati ferry accident A similar accident taking place nine years previously, that involved an Kiribati ferry.
