= December 2012 Gulf of Aden migrant boat disaster =

Gulf of Aden migrant boat disaster
- Date: December 18, 2012
- Location: Off Bosasso, Somalia
- Participants: Somali and Ethiopian migrants
- Outcome: Boat sank
- Deaths: 55

The December 2012 Gulf of Aden migrant boat disaster occurred on 18 December 2012, in the Gulf of Aden off the northern coast of Somalia, when a boat carrying 60 people to Yemen capsized shortly after leaving the port of Bosaso, killing 55 people.

The vessel was carrying workers from Ethiopia and Somalia, who were said to be looking for work in the frankincense trade in Yemen, according to an official at the United Nations refugee agency. Survivors said that the boat began having trouble almost immediately after it left from Bosaso, and it sank just fifteen minutes after its departure. Of the 60 people on board, 23 bodies had been recovered by 20 December, with 32 people still missing and presumed dead. The remaining passengers, five Somali men, survived the sinking and swam to land. Among the dead were more than a dozen women and at least one child.

According to the International Organization for Migration, passengers appeared to have suffered wounds while on board; a survivor said that crew on board the boat had beaten passengers to keep them seated. The UN refugee agency said that the sinking brought the total number of people either missing or confirmed dead in the Gulf of Aden between Somalia and Yemen to 150 during 2012.
