= 2024 Bangui river disaster =

Riverboat capsize in Bangui, Central African Republic

- Date: 19 April 2024
- Location: Bangui, Central African Republic
- Type: Capsizing
- Deaths: 70+ (as of 24 April 2024)
- Injuries: 10+

On 19 April 2024, a riverboat carrying around 300 people en route to a funeral capsized in the Mpoko River, Bangui, Central African Republic.

== Reactions ==
President Faustin-Archange Touadéra announced three days of national mourning from April 22 to 25. During the three-day mourning period, the flag was flown at half-mast.
