= List of shipwrecks in 2009 =

The list of shipwrecks in 2009 includes ships sunk, foundered, grounded, or otherwise lost during 2009.

table of contents
2009
Jan	Feb	Mar	Apr
May	Jun	Jul	Aug
Sep	Oct	Nov	Dec

== January ==
=== 2 January ===
List of shipwrecks: 2 January 2009
Ship	State	Description
Lian Senggigi	Indonesia	The ferry sank near Klungkung, Bali, all were rescued.

=== 3 January ===
List of shipwrecks: 3 January 2009
Ship	State	Description
Patriot	United States	The 62-foot (19 m) fishing trawler capsized and sank in the Atlantic Ocean in 100 feet (30 m) of water in the Stellwagen Bank National Marine Sanctuary (42°24′N 70°27′W). Both crew members died.
Unnamed ferry	Nepal	A ferry capsized on the Koshi River in Nepal with two people killed, eight reported missing, and forty rescued.

=== 4 January ===
List of shipwrecks: 4 January 2009
Ship	State	Description
American Way	United States	After her propulsion failed, the 38.6-foot (11.8 m) fishing vessel drifted onto rocks on the coast of Aghiyuk Island (56°10′N 156°47′W) at the north end of the Semidi Islands southwest of Alaska's Kodiak Island. Her crew of two abandoned ship in a life raft and reached the island, from which a United States Coast Guard Sikorsky HH-60 Jayhawk helicopter rescued them. American Way broke up on the rocks and sank.

=== 11 January ===
List of shipwrecks: 11 January 2009
Ship	State	Description
Teratai Prima	Indonesia	The cargo ship capsized during a cyclone en route from Sulawesi to Kalimantan. The ship had over 300 people on board when it happened. There were 42 survivors including the captain, and at least 200 people were missing.

=== 18 January ===
List of shipwrecks: 18 January 2009
Ship	State	Description
Polar Mist	Chile	The former fishing vessel, carrying 9.5 tonnes of gold bullion, from Puerto de Punta Quilla, Santa Cruz Province, Argentina, to Punta Arenas, Chile, sank 40 nautical miles (74 km) off Punta Loyola in tow of tug Beagle (Chile) after the crew had abandoned her on 16 January in bad weather. The cargo was later recovered.

=== 20 January ===
List of shipwrecks: 20 January 2009
Ship	State	Description
Taube	Germany	The 8.25-metre (27 ft 1 in) sailing yacht capsized due to heavy swells at the mouth of Sebou River, Morocco (34°16′N 06°41′W) later sinking with the loss of six of seven crew.

=== 25 January ===
List of shipwrecks: 25 January 2009
Ship	State	Description
Unnamed boat	Vietnam	A boat sank near Quảng Hải in the Gianh River with the loss of at least 42 lives.

=== 30 January ===
List of shipwrecks: 30 January 2009
Ship	State	Description
Bay Tide	United States	The retired 110-foot (33.5 m) tug was scuttled as an artificial reef in the North Atlantic Ocean off the coast of Delaware at 38°40.540′N 074°43.957′W.
Crazy Horse	United States	The retired 77-foot (23.5 m) fishing trawler was scuttled as an artificial reef in the North Atlantic Ocean off the coast of Delaware at 38°40.540′N 074°43.957′W.

== February ==
=== 5 February ===
List of shipwrecks: 5 February 2009
Ship	State	Description
USS Port Royal	United States Navy	USS Port Royal The Ticonderoga-class guided-missile cruiser ran aground off Oahu, Hawaii. The ship was refloated on 9 February and returned to service after repairs were carried out.

=== 10 February ===
List of shipwrecks: 10 February 2009
Ship	State	Description
Kashimir	Malta	The tanker carrying condensate, and Sima Saman (Singapore), a container ship, collided near Jebel Ali, Dubai; both ships caught fire. The fire on Kashimir was extinguished, but ship badly damaged.

=== 11 February ===
List of shipwrecks: 11 February 2009
Ship	State	Description
Addarwa	United Kingdom	The ship foundered off the Isle of Portland, Dorset.

=== 15 February ===
List of shipwrecks: 15 February 2009
Ship	State	Description
New Star	Sierra Leone	The ship was fired upon by a Russian Coast Guard vessel after leaving Nakhodka without permission. All sixteen crewmembers took to liferafts, but eight were later washed out to sea. New Star later sank.

=== 19 February ===
List of shipwrecks: 19 February 2009
Ship	State	Description
ML Happy	Bangladesh	The ferry sank near Barisal City, Bangladesh, At least 39 people died in the sinking.

=== 22 February ===
List of shipwrecks: 22 February 2009
Ship	State	Description
Monte Galineiro	Spain	The fishing vessel caught fire and sank 400 nautical miles (740 km) from Newfoundland.

=== 25 February ===
List of shipwrecks: 25 February 2009
Ship	State	Description
Icy Mist	United States	After her engine room began flooding during a gale, the 58-foot (17.7 m) fishing vessel was wrecked without loss of life on the northwestern coast of Akutan Island in the Aleutian Islands, 0.5 nautical miles (0.9 km; 0.6 mi) from Hog Island and Unalaska Island. Her crew of four abandoned ship, reached the beach, and was rescued by a United States Coast Guard helicopter.

=== 26 February ===
List of shipwrecks: 26 February 2009
Ship	State	Description
Maxim Gorkiy	Bahamas	The retired cruise ship was beached at Alang, India, for scrapping. She was scrapped where she lay over the next seven months.

== March ==
=== 10 March ===
List of shipwrecks: 10 March 2009
Ship	State	Description
Orchid Pia	South Korea	The cargo ship carrying iron coils, sank after colliding with MV Cygnus Ace (Panama), a car carrier, 120 kilometres (65 nmi) south of Tokyo. Sixteen crewmembers missing.

=== 20 March ===
List of shipwrecks: 20 March 2009
Ship	State	Description
USS Hartford	United States Navy	USS Hartford. USS Hartford and USS New Orleans collision: The Los Angeles-class submarine collided with USS New Orleans (United States Navy) in the Strait of Hormuz. She was under repair until February 2011.

=== 24 March ===
List of shipwrecks: 24 March 2009
Ship	State	Description
Lady Mary	United States	The 71-foot (21.6 m) fishing trawler and scallop dredger sank in 210 feet (64 m) of water in the Atlantic Ocean 65 miles (105 km; 56 nmi) off Cape May, New Jersey, at 40°25.641′N 073°51.135′W with a loss of six lives when her lazarette flooded during a storm. There was one survivor.

=== 27 March ===
List of shipwrecks: 27 March 2009
Ship	State	Description
Unnamed fishing vessel	Libya	A fishing vessel carrying 250 migrants capsized and sank; 21 survivors were rescued. Two other boats with a similar number of migrants aboard were also reported as missing.

=== Unknown date ===
List of shipwrecks: Unknown date 2009
Ship	State	Description
Lynx Effect	United Kingdom	The ship sank in The Solent off Gosport, Hampshire.

== April ==
=== 16 April ===
List of shipwrecks: 16 April 2009
Ship	State	Description
Unnamed boat (SIEV 36)	Indonesia	The boat, carrying illegal immigrants and designated "Suspected Illegal Entry Vessel 36" by Australian authorities, exploded and sank off Ashmore Reef off Australia after the patrol vessel HMAS Albany (Royal Australian Navy) intercepted her. Five people were killed.

=== 17 April ===
List of shipwrecks: 17 April 2009
Ship	State	Description
Seafarer	United States	The 58-foot (18 m) purse seiner rolled on her side and sank in Clarence Strait in the Alexander Archipelago in Southeast Alaska near Narrow Point (55°47′30″N 132°28′30″W), about 7 nautical miles (13 km; 8.1 mi) north of Thorne Bay, Alaska. Her crew of five abandoned ship in a skiff and was rescued by the United States Coast Guard.

=== 25 April ===
List of shipwrecks: 25 April 2009
Ship	State	Description
Princess Taiping	Taiwan	The replica junk sank after being hit by the cargo ship Champion Express.

=== 29 April ===
List of shipwrecks: 29 April 2009
Ship	State	Description
USS Conolly	United States Navy	USS Conolly being sunk. The Spruance-class destroyer was sunk as a target off the coast of Florida.
The Essence	United States	The yacht was in a collision with a cargo ship and sank with the loss of one of her three crewmembers.

== May ==
=== 6 May ===
List of shipwrecks: 6 May 2009
Ship	State	Description
USNS Spica	United States Navy	The inactivated combat stores ship was sunk as a target.

=== 8 May ===
List of shipwrecks: 8 May 2009
Ship	State	Description
Goliath	United Kingdom	The crane barge was beached at Kingsdown after developing a leak and being refused permission to dock at Dover Harbour. The barge was refloated on 9 May.

=== 11 May ===
List of shipwrecks: 11 May 2009
Ship	State	Description
Petrozavodsk	Russia	The cargo ship ran aground at Bear Island in the Barents Sea.

=== 22 May ===
List of shipwrecks: 22 May 2009
Ship	State	Description
Liberty	Russia	The cargo ship foundered south of Cyprus.

=== 27 May ===
List of shipwrecks: 27 May 2009
Ship	State	Description
USNS General Hoyt S. Vandenberg	United States Navy	The decommissioned General G. O. Squier-class transport was scuttled in the Florida Keys to form an artificial reef in the Florida Keys National Marine Sanctuary .

== June ==
=== 6 June ===
List of shipwrecks: 6 June 2009
Ship	State	Description
Miss Lourdies	Haiti	The cargo ship was scuttled off Florida, United States as an artificial reef.

=== 14 June ===
List of shipwrecks: 14 June 2009
Ship	State	Description
IJsselstroom	Netherlands	The tug capsized and sank off Peterhead, Aberdeenshire, United Kingdom.

=== 30 June ===
List of shipwrecks: 30 June 2009
Ship	State	Description
Demas Victory	Saint Vincent and the Grenadines	The supply ship capsized and sank off Doha, Qatar with the loss of 30 lives.

== July ==
=== 13 July ===
List of shipwrecks: 13 July 2009
Ship	State	Description
Unnamed ferry	Kiribati	A ferry capsized and sank between Tarawa and Maiana, with the loss of 33 lives.

=== 26 July ===
List of shipwrecks: 26 July 2009
Ship	State	Description
Unnamed boat	Haiti	A migrant boat capsized and sank near the Turks and Caicos Islands with the loss of about 70 lives.

=== 31 July ===
List of shipwrecks: 31 July 2009
Ship	State	Description
Langeland	Norway	The cargo ship sank due to stormy weather off the west coast of Sweden, and the missing six-person crew are presumed to have drowned.

== August ==
=== 3 August ===
List of shipwrecks: 3 August 2009
Ship	State	Description
Frieda Marie	United States	The 77-foot (23.5 m), 78-foot (23.8 m), or 85-foot (25.9 m) (sources disagree) fishing trawler – a shrimper – ran aground off Assateague Island near Chincoteague Inlet on the Eastern Shore of Virginia. All three people on board survived. She was refloated about two months later but was declared a total loss. She was scuttled as an artificial reef on 16 January 2010.

=== 6 August ===
List of shipwrecks: 6 August 2009
Ship	State	Description
Princess Ashika	Tonga	The ferry sank 86 kilometres (46 nmi) north west of Nuku'alofa. Official figures released by Operation Ashika on 19 August 2009, confirmed that 54 men were rescued, and 74 persons were lost at sea. These include two bodies recovered and 72 missing (68 passengers and 4 crew), including five foreign nationals. Two of the missing passengers remain unidentified.

=== 8 August ===
List of shipwrecks: 8 August 2009
Ship	State	Description
Patty J	United States	The wreck of Patty J. The 59-foot (18.0 m) fishing vessel rolled over and sank after running aground on a reef just outside Square Cove (57°58′40″N 134°45′45″W) near Juneau, Alaska. All five members of her crew abandoned ship in a skiff and another fishing vessel rescued them. The wreck later was dismantled and removed.

=== 12 August ===
List of shipwrecks: 12 August 2009
Ship	State	Description
Antigua	United Kingdom	The ship sank in The Wash.

=== 15 August ===
List of shipwrecks: 15 August 2009
Ship	State	Description
Vigilant	United States	The 58-foot (17.7 m) fishing tender was stranded and lost near the southwest entrance to Chugach Bay, Alaska. After efforts to refloat her failed, the fishing vessel North Star (United States) transported her two-man crew to Homer, Alaska.

=== 16 August ===
List of shipwrecks: 16 August 2009
Ship	State	Description
ORP Bryza	Poland	The former Polish Navy ship was scuttled in the Baltic Sea off the coast of Poland.

=== 20 August ===
List of shipwrecks: 20 August 2009
Ship	State	Description
Formosa Product Brick	Taiwan	The tanker was involved in a collision with a Greek ship in the Malacca Strait and set afire. Nine crew were reported missing. The fire was extinguished.

=== 25 August ===
List of shipwrecks: 25 August 2009
Ship	State	Description
P31	Maritime Squadron of the Armed Forces of Malta	The Kondor I-class patrol boat was scuttled near Comino as an artificial reef.

=== 26 August ===
List of shipwrecks: 26 August 2009
Ship	State	Description
Gulser Ana	Turkey	The bulk carrier ran aground at Cape Vohimena, Madagascar, and was wrecked.

== September ==
=== 5 September ===
List of shipwrecks: 5 September 2009
Ship	State	Description
Ilinden	Macedonia	The tourist ferry Ilinden capsized and sank on Lake Ohrid to the border of Albania and Macedonia. The boat had 70 people on board when it happened. The ferry turned sharply and went down in 30 seconds and decreased visibility at a depth of 20 metres (66 ft) near the beach. 22 were reported dead, including the captain.

=== 6 September ===
List of shipwrecks: 6 September 2009
Ship	State	Description
Algoport	Canada	The cargo ship broke in half and sank in heavy seas while under tow to China for conversion. the tow encountered rough seas from Tropical Storm Dujuan. There were no injuries, loss of life or environmental issues reported from the foundering.
SuperFerry 9	Philippines	The ferry sank off the Zamboanga peninsula, of 866 people on board, at least 10 lives were lost.

=== 8 September ===
List of shipwrecks: 8 September 2009
Ship	State	Description
Seli 1	Panama	The Turkish bulk carrier, operated by TEB Maritime of Istanbul, was en route to Gibraltar when it was driven aground off Bloubergstrand near Table Bay in South Africa by strong westerly winds shortly after midnight on 8 September 2009, having reported engine failure and a snapped anchor chain.

=== 9 September ===
List of shipwrecks: 9 September 2009
Ship	State	Description
Teh Teh	Sierra Leone	The ferry sank with at least 260 people on board and a majority of these were young people going back to school after school holidays. At least 40 people have been rescued by the police and 120 bodies were recovered until 12 September, most of them were found on the shoreline. About 100 people was listed missing. The accident took place 12 kilometres (7.5 mi) outside Sierra Leone's capital Freetown. The cause of the accident was that the ship's engines stopped during a severe storm and the boat capsized.

=== 10 September ===
List of shipwrecks: 10 September 2009
Ship	State	Description
Unknown ferry	Sierra Leone	A ferry suddenly sank off the coastal village of Longsheng southeast of the capital, Freetown in a Sierra Leone river. It was reported that 300 people were on board. At least 40 people were rescued and at least 16 deceased were recovered. Others were still reported missing, mostly schoolchildren on their way to school. The incident occurred on 10 September and was reported to have been very rapid. The boat sank in a few minutes in strong winds and heavy rain and there were no life jackets on board..

=== 15 September ===
List of shipwrecks: 15 September 2009
Ship	State	Description
Agios Dimitrios 1	Panama	The container ship was driven ashore and wrecked on Gaolan Island, China.

=== 30 September ===
List of shipwrecks: 30 September 2009
Ship	State	Description
Jalakanyaka	India	The passenger boat sank in Lake Thekaddy with the loss of 45 lives.

== October ==
=== 4 October ===
List of shipwrecks: 4 October 2009
Ship	State	Description
HMAS Canberra	Royal Australian Navy	Th decommissioned Adelaide-class guided-missile frigate was sunk as a dive wreck in Bass Strait 2 nautical miles (3.7 km) off Ocean Grove, Victoria, Australia.

=== 11 October ===
List of shipwrecks: 11 October 2009
Ship	State	Description
Rascal	United States	The 36-foot (11 m) fishing vessel was wrecked on Saint Lazaria Island (56°59′15″N 135°42′00″W) in Southeast Alaska west of Sitka, Alaska. A United States Coast Guard rescued the only person on board.
Shockwave	Australia	The racing yacht sank off Port Kembla, Australia with loss of two lives.

=== 24 October ===
List of shipwrecks: 24 October 2009
Ship	State	Description
Marko Polo	Croatia	A ferry owned by the Croatian company Jadrolinija, ran aground on the small island of Sit. No one was injured.

=== 30 October ===
List of shipwrecks: 30 October 2009
Ship	State	Description
Carley Renee	United States	The 69-gross ton, 59.2-foot (18.0 m) cod-fishing vessel capsized in the Aleutian Islands approximately 22 nautical miles (41 km; 25 mi) east of Unalaska Island. Wearing survival suits, all four members of her crew abandoned ship in a life raft and were rescued by the fishing vessel Guardian (United States). The overturned Carley Renee grounded on Egg Island. During salvage efforts, she sank in 720 feet (220 m) of water near Sedanka Pass.

== November ==
=== 2 November ===
List of shipwrecks: 2 November 2009
Ship	State	Description
		The November 2009 Indian Ocean migrant boat disaster occurred in the early hours of 2 November 2009, when a boat carrying about forty Sri Lankan asylum seekers sank in the Indian Ocean at a distance of some 350 nautical miles (650 km) north-west of the Cocos (Keeling) Islands.

=== 13 November ===
List of shipwrecks: 13 November 2009
Ship	State	Description
Ariake	Japan	Ariake, February 2010 A ferry travelling from Tokyo, ran aground in high winds off Kumano, Mie Prefecture, Japan. All 21 crew and 7 passengers were rescued.

=== 17 November ===
List of shipwrecks: 17 November 2009
Ship	State	Description
Naywintun	Myanmar	A ferry travelling between Pathein and Thetkelthaung sank after colliding with a barge. At least 50 people reported killed.

=== 21 November ===
List of shipwrecks: 21 November 2009
Ship	State	Description
S. Gabriel	Germany	The 100.6-metre (330 ft 1 in) cargo ship ran aground 5 nautical miles (9.3 km; 5.8 mi) east of Ponta Delgada, the Azores (37°43′N 25°32′W). Refloated on 7 December 2009 and taken to Ponta Delgada where she was declared a constructive total loss.

=== 22 November ===
List of shipwrecks: 22 November 2009
Ship	State	Description
Dumai Express 10	Indonesia	A ferry operating between Bantam Island and Dumai capsized and sank with 291 people on board, comprising 251 adult passengers, 25 children and 15 crew members, killing at least 30 people. The waves were up to 6 metres (20 ft) high and washed over the deck so water ran down and sunk the vessel.

=== 28 November ===
List of shipwrecks: 28 November 2009
Ship	State	Description
Coco-4	Bangladesh	The ferry capsized at Lalmohan, Bhola Island, killing at least 75 people.

== December ==
=== 4 December ===
List of shipwrecks: 4 December 2009
Ship	State	Description
Unnamed ferry	Bangladesh	An unnamed ferry collided with a launch in fog. At least 47 reported killed, with 8 people unaccounted for when the search was called off.

=== 5 December ===
List of shipwrecks: 5 December 2009
Ship	State	Description
Two ferries	Egypt	Two unidentified ferries collided on the River Nile in Egypt. One was cut in two and sank, the other capsized.

=== 10 December ===
List of shipwrecks: 10 December 2009
Ship	State	Description
New Jersey	United States	The motor ferry, part of the Cape May-Lewes Ferry fleet, ran aground on a sandbar in the Delaware Bay off the coast of New Jersey near the mouth of the Cape May Canal during an unusually low tide. She suffered no structural damage and a rising tide refloated her.

=== 16 December ===
List of shipwrecks: 16 December 2009
Ship	State	Description
Karim Junior	Togo	The cargo ship came ashore in a storm at Tenes, Algeria and broke in two with the loss of eight of her nine crew.

=== 17 December ===
List of shipwrecks: 17 December 2009
Ship	State	Description
Danny F II	Panama	The cargo ship capsized and sank 11 nautical miles (20 km) off Tripoli, Lebanon.

=== 20 December ===
List of shipwrecks: 20 December 2009
Ship	State	Description
Etoile des Ondes	United Kingdom	The fishing vessel sank after a collision with Alam Pintar (Singapore) resulting in the death of one crew member. Nearby ships did not respond to distress signals issued by the crew of Etoile des Ondes.

=== 23 December ===
List of shipwrecks: 23 December 2009
Ship	State	Description
Catalyn V	Philippines	The ferry collided with a fishing boat in Manila Bay. Both vessels sank with the loss of 27 lives.
