= 2009 in Bangladesh =

- Centuries: 20th; 21st
- Decades: 1980s; 1990s; 2000s; 2010s; 2020s
- See also: Other events of 2009; List of years in Bangladesh

2009 (MMIX) was a common year starting on Thursday of the Gregorian calendar, the 2009th year of the Common Era (CE) and Anno Domini (AD) designations, the 9th year of the 3rd millennium and the 21st century, and the 10th and last year of the 2000s decade.

The year 2009 was the 38th year after the independence of Bangladesh. It was also the first year of the second term of the government of Sheikh Hasina.

== Incumbents ==
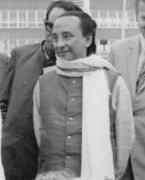
Zillur
Rahman

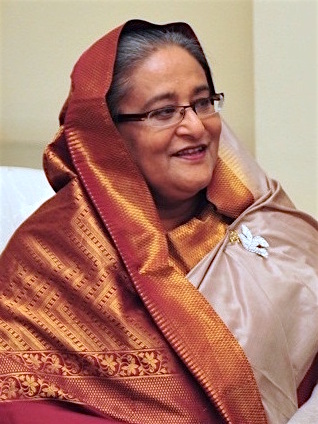
Sheikh
Hasina

- President: Iajuddin Ahmed (until 12 February), Zillur Rahman (starting 6 February)
- Prime Minister: Fakhruddin Ahmed (acting) (until 6 January), Sheikh Hasina (starting 6 January)
- Chief Justice: Md. Ruhul Amin (until 23 December), Md. Tafazzul Islam (starting 23 December)

== Demography ==
Demographic Indicators for Bangladesh in 2009
Population, total	145,924,795
Population density (per km^{2})	1121.0
Population growth (annual %)	1.1%
Male to Female Ratio (every 100 Female)	103.7
Urban population (% of total)	29.7%
Birth rate, crude (per 1,000 people)	21.6
Death rate, crude (per 1,000 people)	5.8
Mortality rate, under 5 (per 1,000 live births)	52
Life expectancy at birth, total (years)	69.5
Fertility rate, total (births per woman)	2.4

== Climate ==
Climate data for Bangladesh in 2009
Month	Jan	Feb	Mar	Apr	May	Jun	Jul	Aug	Sep	Oct	Nov	Dec	Year
Daily mean °C (°F)	20.2 (68.4)	22.6 (72.7)	26.2 (79.2)	29.2 (84.6)	28.5 (83.3)	29.2 (84.6)	28.5 (83.3)	28.5 (83.3)	29.0 (84.2)	27.3 (81.1)	24.3 (75.7)	20.1 (68.2)	26.1 (79.0)
Average precipitation mm (inches)	1.1 (0.04)	20.4 (0.80)	19.9 (0.78)	230.9 (9.09)	256.9 (10.11)	217.5 (8.56)	511.1 (20.12)	268.0 (10.55)	260.3 (10.25)	119.3 (4.70)	60.2 (2.37)	2.9 (0.11)	1,968.5 (77.48)
Source: Climatic Research Unit (CRU) of University of East Anglia (UEA)

== Economy ==
Key Economic Indicators for Bangladesh in 2009
National Income
	Current US$	Current BDT	% of GDP
GDP	$102.5 billion	BDT7.1 trillion	
GDP growth (annual %)	5.0%		
GDP per capita	$702.3	BDT48,317	
Agriculture, value added	$17.5 billion	BDT1.2 trillion	17.1%
Industry, value added	$25.9 billion	BDT1.8 trillion	25.3%
Services, etc., value added	$54.6 billion	BDT3.8 trillion	53.3%
Balance of Payment
	Current US$	Current BDT	% of GDP
Current account balance	$3.6 billion		3.5%
Imports of goods and services	$23.1 billion	BDT1.6 trillion	23.2%
Exports of goods and services	$17,047.5 million	BDT1.2 trillion	16.9%
Foreign direct investment, net inflows	$901.3 million		0.9%
Personal remittances, received	$10,520.7 million		10.3%
Total reserves (includes gold) at year end	$10,341.5 million		
Total reserves in months of imports	5.1		

Note: For 2009, the average official exchange rate for BDT was 69.04 per US$.

== Events ==
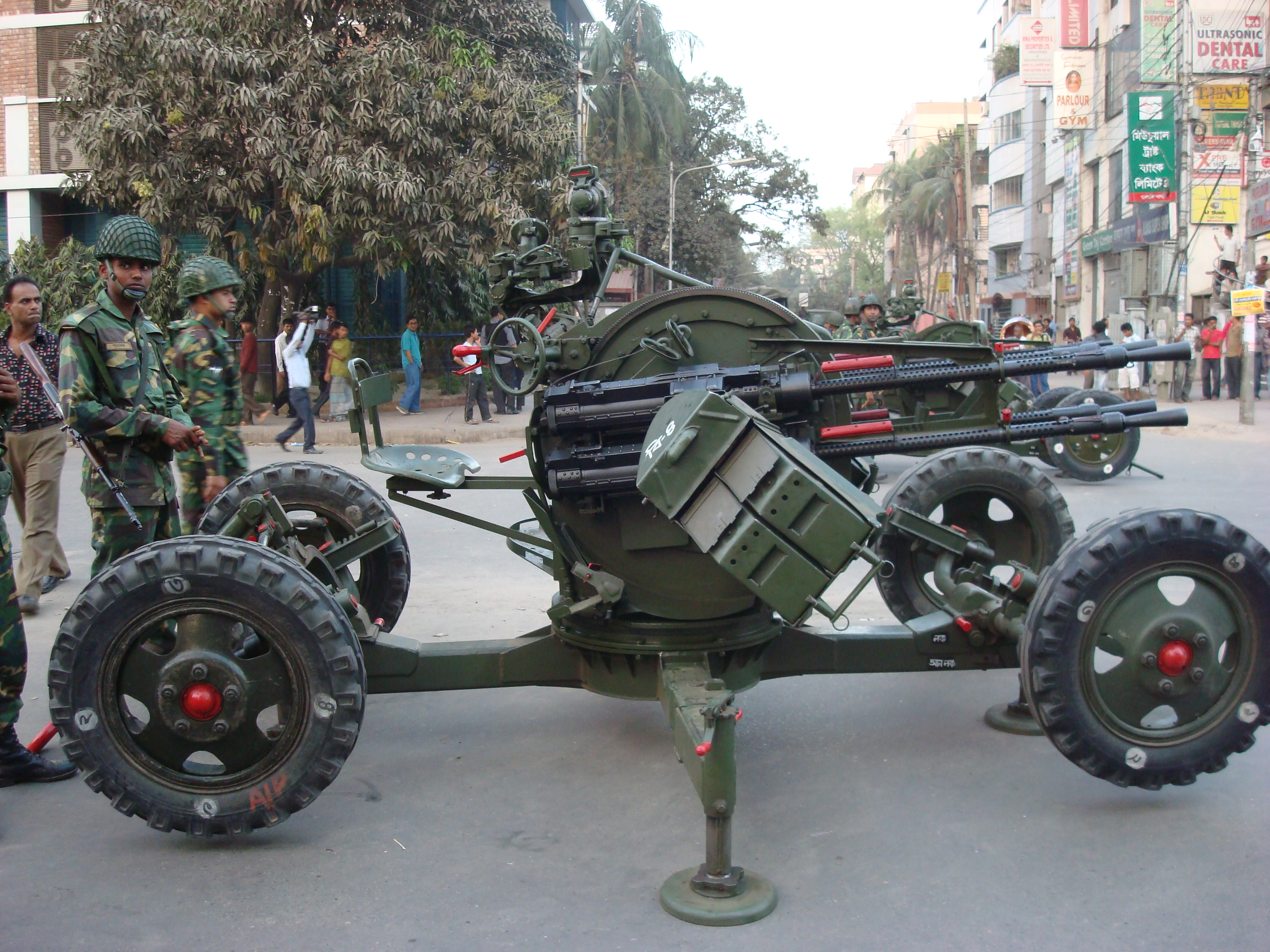
14.5 ADMG Cannon of Bangladesh Army positioned over Satmasjid Road, near Dhanmondi 8A road, pointing towards Pilkhana on 25 February 2009.

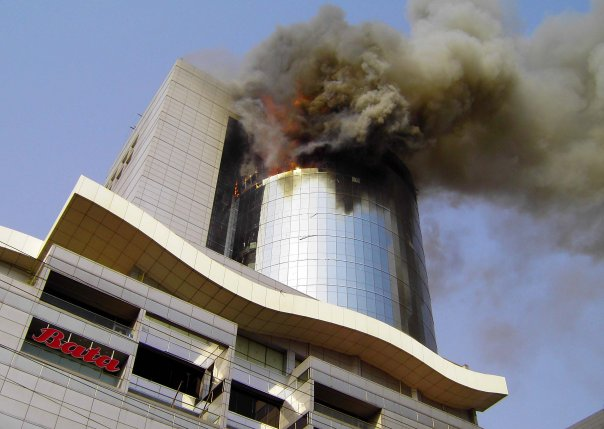
Fire at Bashundhara city shopping mall on 13 March 2009.

- 19 February - ML Happy sinks near Barisal City. At least 39 people died in the sinking.
- 25 February – Mutiny is staged by Bangladesh Rifles, a paramilitary force at BDR HQ, Pilkhana, Dhaka. The rebelling BDR soldiers take over the BDR headquarters in Pilkhana, killing the BDR Director-General Shakil Ahmed along with 56 other army officers and 17 civilians. They also fire on civilians, hold many of their officers and their families hostage, vandalise property and loot valuables. By the second day, unrest spreads to 12 other towns and cities. The mutiny ends as the mutineers surrender their arms and release the hostages after discussions and negotiations with the government.
- 13 March – A fire at Bashundhara City shopping mall kills 7 and injures 50 more. The blaze started around 1:30 pm, after Friday prayers, on one of the top floors. Most of the offices were empty, as Friday is the first day of the weekend in Bangladesh. A security guard died as he jumped off the top of the building to escape the fire. Seventeen others were injured. The chief security officer of the building was rescued from the rooftop by a Bangladesh Air Force Bell-212 helicopter.
- 17 April - Police arrest 31 suspected Hizb ut-Tahrir members for planning terrorism.
- 25 May – Cyclone Aila ravages the south-west coast.
- 27 November - A ferry named MV Coco-4 sinks near Bhola Island, killing 75 people, out of more than a thousand on board, with several dozen more reported missing.
- 4 December - Another ferry sinks in the Daira River, in Mithamain Upazila, Kishoreganj District, killing at least 47 people.

=== Awards and recognitions ===
==== International recognition ====
- 1 May - Bangladeshi attorney and environmentalist Rizwana Hasan was awarded the Goldman Environmental Prize in 2009.
- 12 August – Muhammad Yunus, founder of Grameen Bank, was awarded the Presidential Medal of Freedom by US President Barack Obama.

==== Independence Day Award ====
Recipients	Area	Note
Abdul Gaffar Choudhury	literature	
Abdul Matin	culture	
Professor A M Harun-or Rashid	science and technology	
Ivy Rahman	social welfare	posthumous

==== Ekushey Padak ====
1. Burhanuddin Khan Jahangir (education)
2. Syed Anwar Husain (research)
3. Mahbub Ul Alam Choudhury (language movement)
4. Ashraf Uz Zaman Khan (journalism)
5. Begum Bilkis Nasir Uddin (journalism)
6. Manik Chandra Saha (journalism)
7. Humayun Kabir Balu (journalism)
8. Selina Hossain (literature)
9. Shamsuzzaman Khan (research)
10. Qazi Kholiquzzaman Ahmad (poverty reduction)
11. Mohammad Rafi Khan (social service)
12. Monsur Ul Karim (fine arts)
13. Ramendu Majumdar (theatre)

=== Sports ===
- Kabaddi:
  - Bangladesh won the bronze medal in Kabaddi in the Asian Indoor Games.
- Football:
  - Bangladesh hosted the SAFF Championship from 4 to 13 December. Bangladesh lost to India in the semi-finals.
  - Abahani Limited Dhaka defended the B. League title.
  - Dhaka Mohammedan Sporting Club won the inaugural Bangladesh Super Cup and received prize money of Tk 1.20 crore.
- Cricket:

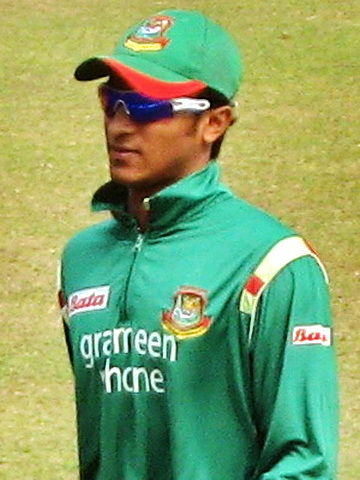
Shakib in the 3rd and the final ODI against Zimbabwe in January 2009

  - The Bangladesh cricket team started the year with an on-going Test series against Sri Lanka. They lost their first test match of the year.
  - After the test series, Sri Lanka and Zimbabwe joined host Bangladesh in a tri-series. Bangladesh became runner-up while Sri Lanka became champion. Shakib Al Hasan from Bangladesh was judged the Player of the Series.
  - The Bangladesh cricket team toured the West Indies during the 2009 international season, from 3 July 2009 to 2 August 2009. The tour consisted of a two-Test series, a three-ODI series, and one Twenty20 International. Due to industrial action between the West Indies Cricket Board and the West Indies Players' Association, the West Indies fielded a weak team that was missing its entire First XI during the series. Bangladesh easily accounted for the weakened West Indian team, winning the Test series 2–0 and the ODI series 3–0. In the Test series, Bangladesh recorded only its second and third Test wins ever, its first and second Test wins as the touring side, its first series win as the touring side, and its first Test series whitewash. In the ODI series, it was also Bangladesh's first series win as the touring side against a Test nation, and its first series whitewash against a Test nation. The West Indies won the Twenty20 match.
  - Later, the Bangladesh cricket team toured Zimbabwe. They played five One Day Internationals against Zimbabwe and won the series 4–1.
  - The Zimbabwe Cricket Team again toured Bangladesh from 27 October to 5 November. The tour consisted of 5 ODIs. Bangladesh won the series 4–1.

== Deaths ==
- 25 February – Md Shawkat Imam, army colonel (b. 1961)
- 16 April – Husne Ara Kamal, academic, philanthropist, and social worker (b. 1934)
- 9 May – M. A. Wazed Miah, nuclear scientist and husband of Prime Minister Sheikh Hasina (b. 1942)
- 5 June – M. A. Sattar, industrialist and politician (b. 1925)
- 17 June – Gaziul Haque, language activist and author (b. 1929)
- 12 September – Shah Abdul Karim, baul musician (b. 1916)
- 3 December – Swadesh Bose, economist (b. 1928)

== See also ==
- 2000s in Bangladesh
- List of Bangladeshi films of 2009
- Timeline of Bangladeshi history
