= Cochinchina =

Historical name for various regions of Vietnam

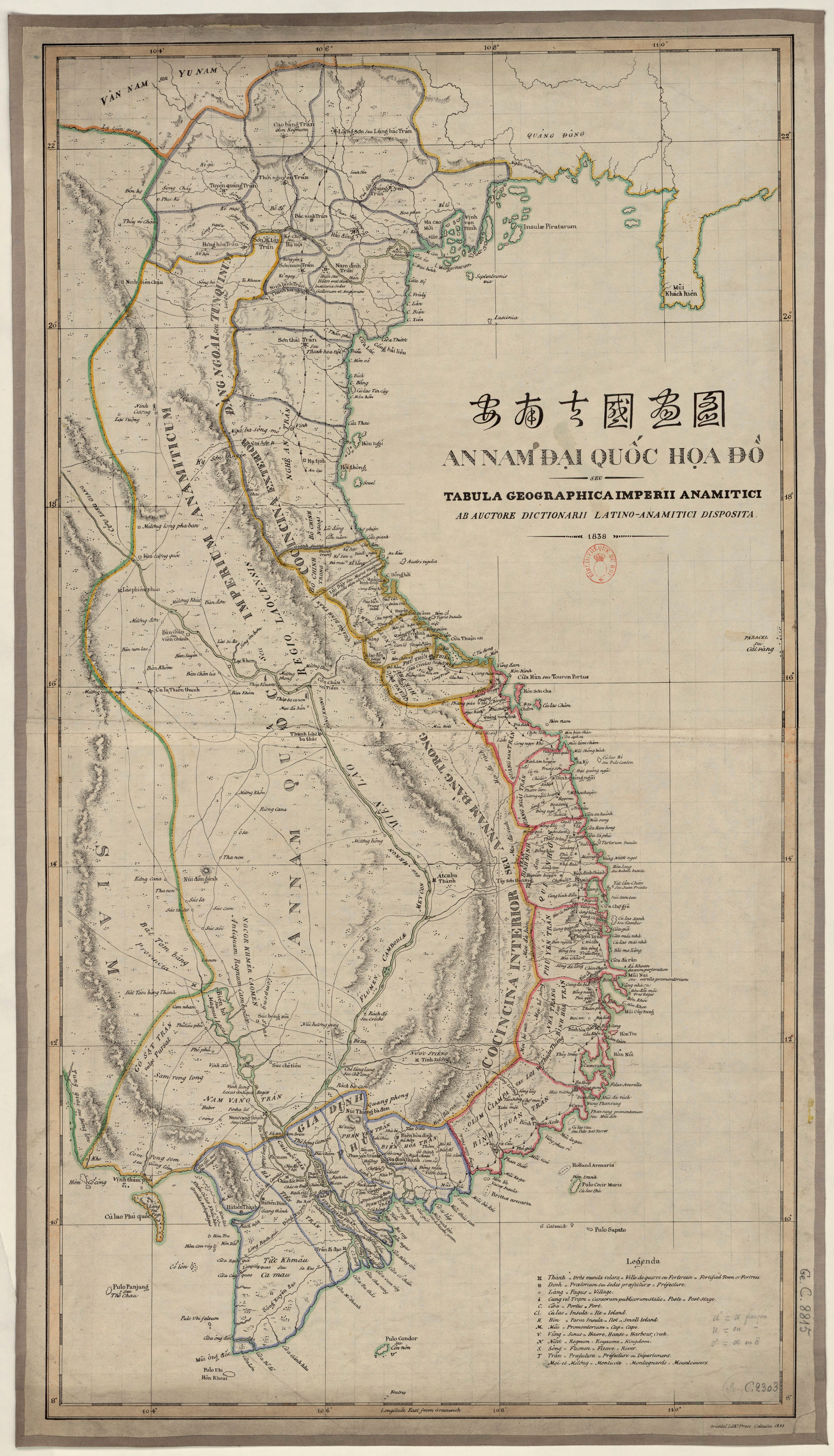
An 1838 map of Cochinchina by Jean-Louis Taberd

Cochinchina or Cochin-China (/ˌkoʊtʃɪnˈtʃaɪnə/, UK also /ˌkɒtʃ-/; Vietnamese: Đàng Trong (17th–18th centuries), Việt Nam (1802–1831), Đại Nam (1831–1862), Nam Kỳ (1862–1945); Khmer: កូសាំងស៊ីន, romanized: Kosăngsin; French: Cochinchine) is a historical exonym for part of Vietnam, depending on the contexts, usually for Southern Vietnam. Sometimes it referred to the whole of Vietnam, but it was commonly used to refer to the region south of the Gianh River.

In the 17th and 18th centuries, Vietnam was divided between the Trịnh lords to the north and the Nguyễn lords to the south. The two domains bordered each other on the Son River. The northern section was called Tonkin by Europeans, and the southern part, Đàng Trong, was called Cochinchina by most Europeans and Quinam by the Dutch.

Jean-Louis Taberd, in his 1838 map, called Tonkin as "Cocincina exterior" (Đàng Ngoài) and "Cochin China" (Note: Jean-Louis Taberd was likely among the first to explain the meaning of "Cochin China" in his 1837 scientific article; see quotation in Notes on Vietnam History.) as "Cocincina interior" (Đàng Trong). In this classic 1838 map, the Gianh River is north of "Lũy Sầy" (an incorrect pronunciation and spelling of "Lũy Thầy" (Note: "Lũy Thầy" means the "Defense Wall (Lũy) by the Teacher (Thầy)," which was annotated in German as "Alter Grenzwall" meaning "Old border wall" in the 1867 map by Adolf Bastian. See Notes on Vietnam History, for more details.)) demarcating "Cocincina exterior" (or "Outer Annam") from "Cocincina interior" (or "Inner Annam"). A small river immediately north of "Lũy Sầy", drawn but not annotated, was likely the Son River, a tributary to the Gianh River.

Lower Cochinchina (Basse-Cochinchine), whose principal city is Saigon, is the newest territory of the Vietnamese people in the movement of Nam tiến (Southward expansion). This region was also the first part of Vietnam to be colonized by the French. Inaugurated as the French Cochinchina in 1862, this colonial administrative unit reached its full extent from 1867 and was a constituent territory of French Indochina from 1887 until early 1945. So during the French colonial period, the label Cochinchina moved further south, and came to refer exclusively to the southernmost part of Vietnam. Beside the French colony of Cochinchina, the two other parts of Vietnam at the time were the French protectorates of Annam (Central Vietnam) and Tonkin (Northern Vietnam). South Vietnam (also called Nam Việt) was reorganized from the State of Vietnam after the Geneva Conference in 1954 by combining Lower Cochinchina with the southern part of Annam, the former protectorate.

== Background ==
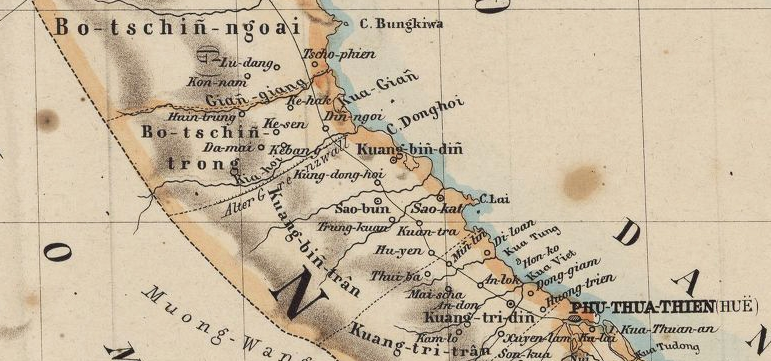
Lũy Thầy (The Defense Wall of Đàng Trong) or in German "Alter Grenzwall" (Old Border Wall) by Adolf Bastian.

The conquest of the south of present-day Vietnam was a long process of territorial acquisition by the Vietnamese. It is called Nam tiến (English meaning "South[ern] Advance") by Vietnamese historians. Vietnam (then known as Đại Việt) greatly expanded its territory in 1470 under the emperor Lê Thánh Tông, at the expense of Champa. The next two hundred years was a time of territorial consolidation and civil war with only gradual expansion southwards.

In 1516, Portuguese traders sailing from Malacca landed in Da Nang, Đại Việt, and established a presence there. They named the area "Cochin-China", borrowing the first part from the Malay Kuchi, Kochi, Kuci, or Koci (unrelated to Indian or Japanese cities of Kochi), which referred to all of Vietnam. They appended the "China" specifier to distinguish the area from the city and the princely state of Cochin in India, their first headquarters in the Malabar Coast.

As a result of a civil war that started in 1520, the Emperor of China sent a commission to study the political status of Annam in 1536. As a consequence of the delivered report, he declared war against the Mạc dynasty. The nominal ruler of the Mạc died at the very time that the Chinese armies passed the frontiers of the kingdom in 1537, and his father, Mạc Đăng Dung (the real power in any case), hurried to submit to the Imperial will, and declared himself to be a vassal of China. The Chinese declared that both the Lê dynasty and the Mạc had a right to part of the lands and so they recognised the Lê rule in the southern part of Vietnam while at the same time recognising the Mạc rule in the northern part, which was called Tunquin (i.e. Tonkin). This was to be a feudatory state of China under the government of the Mạc.

However, this arrangement did not last long. In 1592, Trịnh Tùng, leading the Royal (Trịnh) army, conquered nearly all of the Mạc territory and moved the Lê kings back to the original capital of Hanoi. The Mạc only held on to a tiny part of north Vietnam until 1677, when Trịnh Tạc conquered the last Mạc lands.

== Cochinchina Kingdom of the Nguyen lords (1600–1774) ==
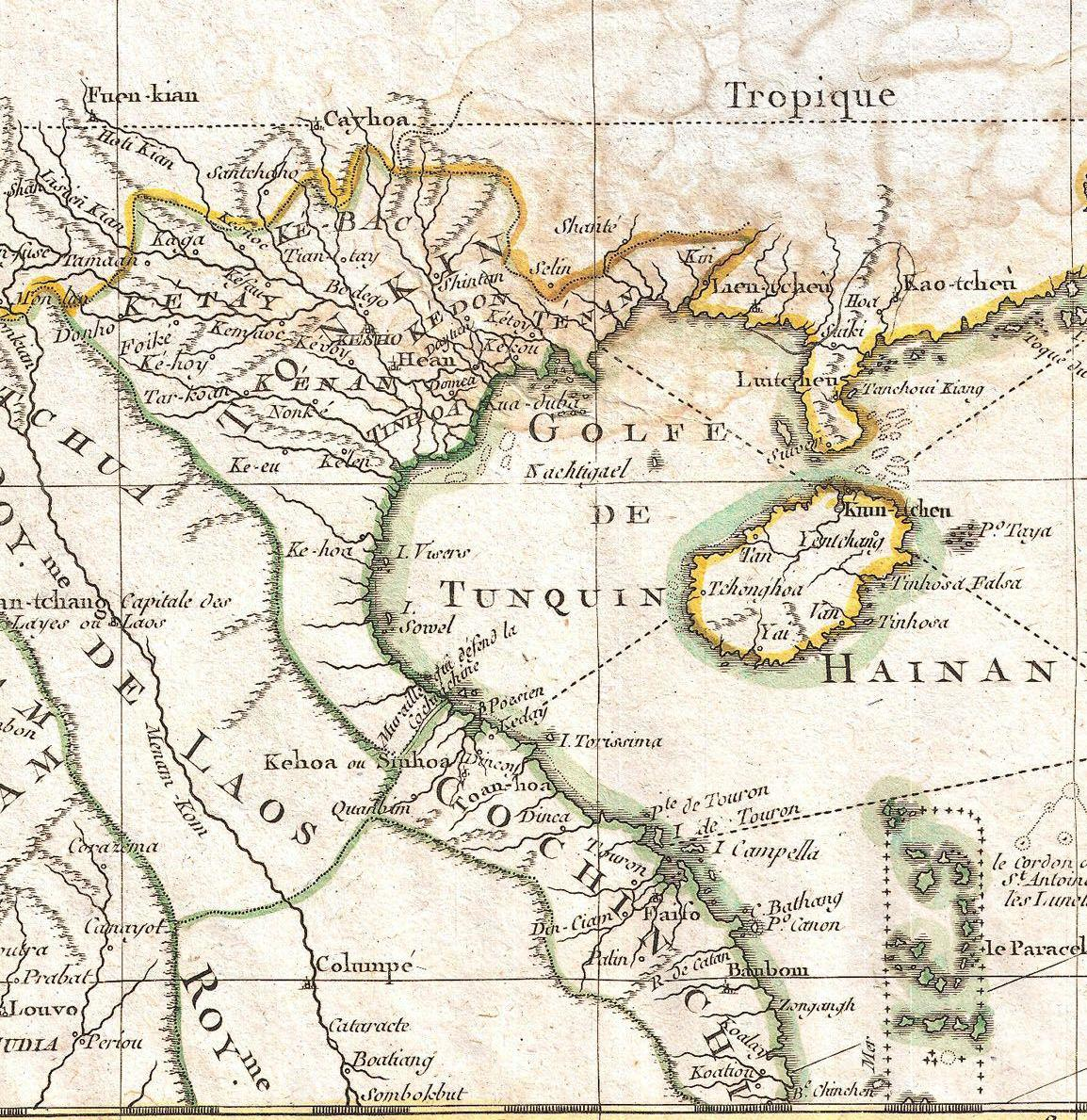
1771 Map of Tonkin and Cochinchina by Rigobert Bonne (1727–1794).

In 1600 after returning from Tonkin, lord Nguyễn Hoàng built his own government in the two southern provinces of Thuận Hóa and Quảng Nam, today in central Vietnam. In 1623, lord Nguyễn Phúc Nguyên established a trading community at Saigon, then called Prey Nakor, with the consent of the king of Cambodia, Chey Chettha II. Over the next 50 years, Vietnamese control slowly expanded in this area but only gradually as the Nguyễn were fighting a protracted civil war with the Trịnh lords in the north.

With the end of the war with the Trịnh, the Nguyễn were able to devote more effort (and military force) to conquest of the south. First, the remaining Champa territories were taken; next, the areas around the Mekong river were placed under Vietnamese control. At least three wars were fought between the Nguyễn lords and the Cambodian kings in the period 1715 to 1770 with the Vietnamese gaining more territory with each war. The wars all involved the much more powerful Siamese kings who fought on behalf of their vassals, the Cambodians.

During the late 18th century emerged the Tây Sơn Rebellion, coming out from the Nguyễn domain. In 1774, the Trịnh army captured the capital Phú Xuân of the Nguyễn realm, whose leaders then had to flee to Lower Cochinchina. The three brothers of Tây Sơn, former peasants, however, soon succeeded in conquering first the lands of the Nguyễn and then the lands of the Trịnh, briefly unifying Vietnam.

== Cochinchina Empire of the Nguyễn (1802–1862) ==
Final unification of Vietnam came under Nguyễn Phúc Ánh, a tenacious member of the Nguyễn noble family who fought for 25 years against the Tây Sơn and ultimately conquered the entire country in 1802. He ruled all of Vietnam under the name Gia Long. His son Minh Mạng reigned from 14 February 1820 until 20 January 1841 what was known to the British as Cochin China and to the Americans as hyphenated Cochin-China. In hopes of negotiating commercial treaties, the British in 1822 sent East India Company agent John Crawfurd, and the Americans in 1833 sent diplomatist Edmund Roberts, who returned in 1836. Neither envoy was fully cognizant of conditions within the country, and neither succeeded.

Gia Long's successors (see the Nguyễn dynasty for details) repelled the Siamese from Cambodia and even annexed Phnom Penh and surrounding territory in the war between 1831 and 1834, but were forced to relinquish these conquests in the war between 1841 and 1845.

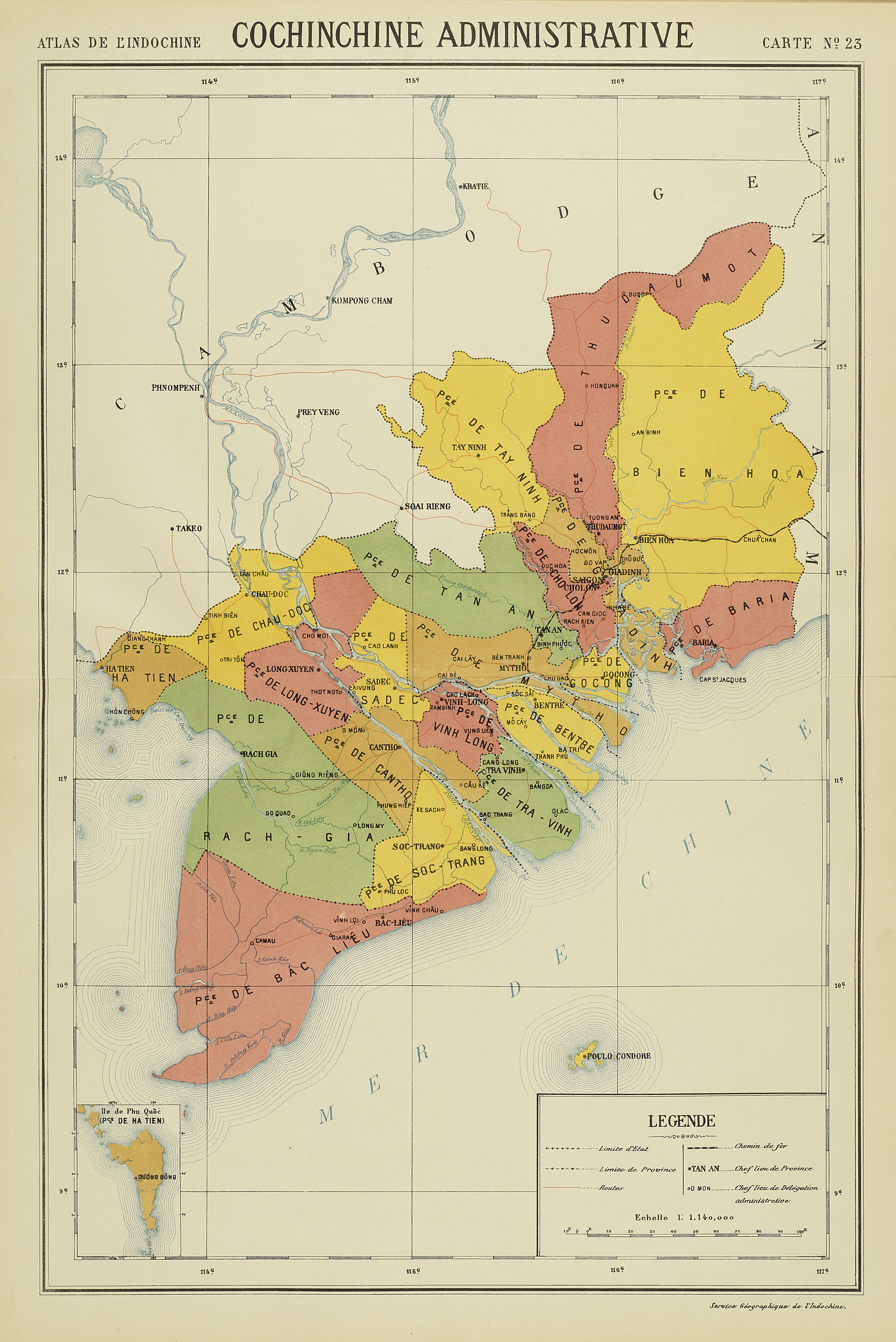
Map of French Cochinchina.

== Colonial Cochinchina: 1862–1945 ==
=== French conquest ===
For a series of complex reasons, the Second French Empire of Napoleon III, with the help of Spanish troops arriving from the Spanish East Indies, attacked Đà Nẵng (Tourane) of Nguyen Dynasty Vietnam in September 1858. Unable to occupy Đà Nẵng, the alliance moved to Lower Cochinchina in the South. On 17 February 1859, they captured Saigon. Later on, the French defeated the Nguyễn army at the Battle of Ky Hoa in 1861. The Vietnamese government was forced to cede the three southern Vietnamese provinces of Biên Hòa, Gia Định and Định Tường to France in the June 1862 Treaty of Saigon.

In 1867, French Admiral Pierre de la Grandière forced the Vietnamese to surrender three additional provinces, Châu Đốc, Hà Tiên and Vĩnh Long. With these three additions all of southern Vietnam and the Mekong Delta fell under French control.

=== French colony ===
In 1871 all the territories ceded to the French in southern Vietnam were incorporated as colony of Cochinchina, with Admiral Dupré as its first governor. As a result, the name "Cochinchina" came to refer exclusively to the southern third of Vietnam. (In Catholic ecclesiastical contexts Cochinchina still related to the older meaning of Đàng Trong until 1924 when the three Apostolic Vicariates of Northern, Eastern, and Western Cochinchina were renamed to Apostolic Vicariates of Huế, Qui Nhơn, and Saïgon).

In 1887, the colony became a confederal member of the Union of French Indochina. Unlike the protectorates of Annam (central Vietnam) and Tonkin (northern Vietnam), Cochinchina was ruled directly by the French, both de jure and de facto, and was represented by a deputy in the National Assembly in Paris. Within Indochina, Cochinchina was the territory with the greatest European presence. At its height, in 1940, it was estimated at 16,550 people, the vast majority living in Saigon.

The French authorities dispossessed Vietnamese landowners and peasants to ensure European control of the expansion of rice and rubber production. As they expanded in response to the increased rubber demand after the First World War, the European plantations recruited, as indentured labour, workers from "the overcrowded villages of the Red River Delta in Tonkin and the coastal lowlands of Annam". These migrants brought south the influence of the Communist Party of Nguyen Ai Quoc (Ho Chi Minh), and of other underground nationalist parties (the Tan Viet and Việt Nam Quốc Dân Đảng – VNQDD). At the same time, the local peasantry were driven into debt servitude, and into plantation labour, by land and poll taxes. Such conditions contributed to the 1916 Cochinchina uprising, and to widespread agrarian and labor unrest in 1930-32.

In 1936 the formation in France of the Popular Front government led by Leon Blum was accompanied by promises of colonial reform. Failure to deliver, helped generate further unrest culminating in the summer of 1937 in general dock and transport strikes. The left anti-colonial forces split between the Moscow-oriented Communist Party and their Trotskyist left opposition and, following the French declaration of war against Germany in September 1939 was suppressed. Under the slogan "Land to the Tillers, Freedom for the workers and independence for Vietnam", in November 1940 the Communist Party in Cochinchina instigated a widespread insurrection. Fighting in the Mekong Delta continued until the end of the year.

== Southern Resistance War and incorporation into South Vietnam, 1945–1955 ==
Cochinchina was occupied by Japan during World War II (1941–45). After the Japanese surrender in August 1945, the Communist-front Viet Minh had declared a provisional government (a Southern Administrative Committee) in Saigon. In Saigon, the violence of a French restoration assisted by British and surrendered Japanese troops, triggered a general uprising on September 23. In the course of what became known as the Southern Resistance War (Nam Bộ kháng chiến) the Viet Minh defeated rival resistance forces but, by the end of 1945, had been pushed out of Saigon and major urban centres into the countryside.

After 1945, the status of Cochinchina was a subject of discord between France and Ho Chi Minh's Viet Minh. In 1946, the French proclaimed Cochinchina an "autonomous republic", which was one of the causes of the First Indochina War. In 1948, Cochinchina was renamed as the Provisional Government of Southern Vietnam. It was merged the next year with the Provisional Central Government of Vietnam, and the State of Vietnam, with former emperor Bảo Đại as head of state, was then officially established.

After the First Indochina War and temporary partition of Vietnam agreed at Geneva, with French and American patronage Cochinchina was merged in 1955 with Annam south of the 17th parallel to form the Republic of Vietnam, "South Vietnam", under the presidency of Ngo Dinh Diem.

== Gallery ==
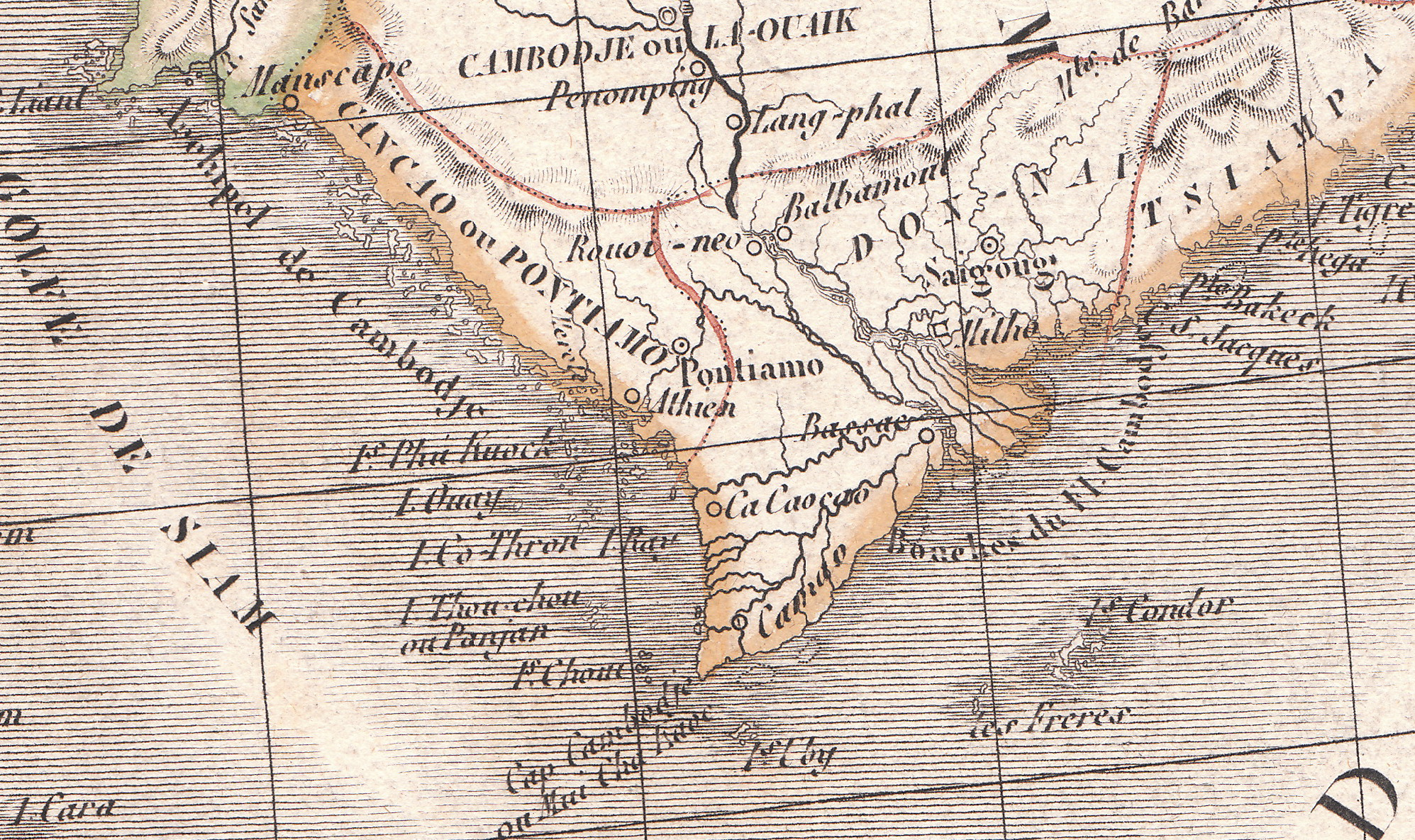
Cochinchina in 1829 under Nguyễn Dynasty

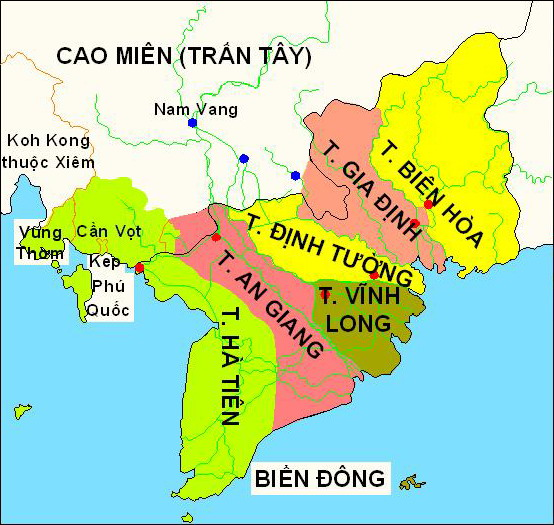
Cochinchina in 1832–1841

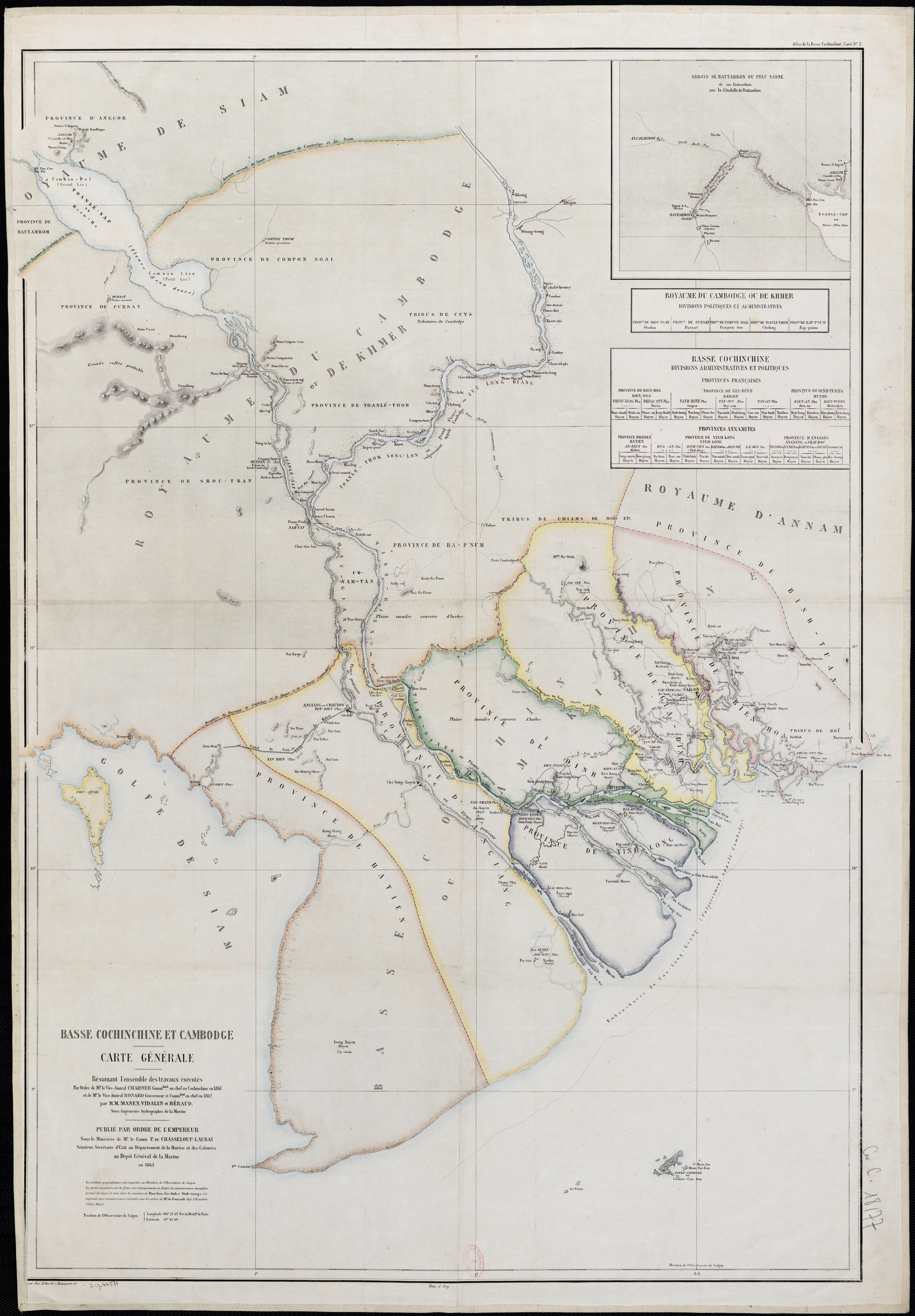
The six provinces of Lower Cochinchina in 1863

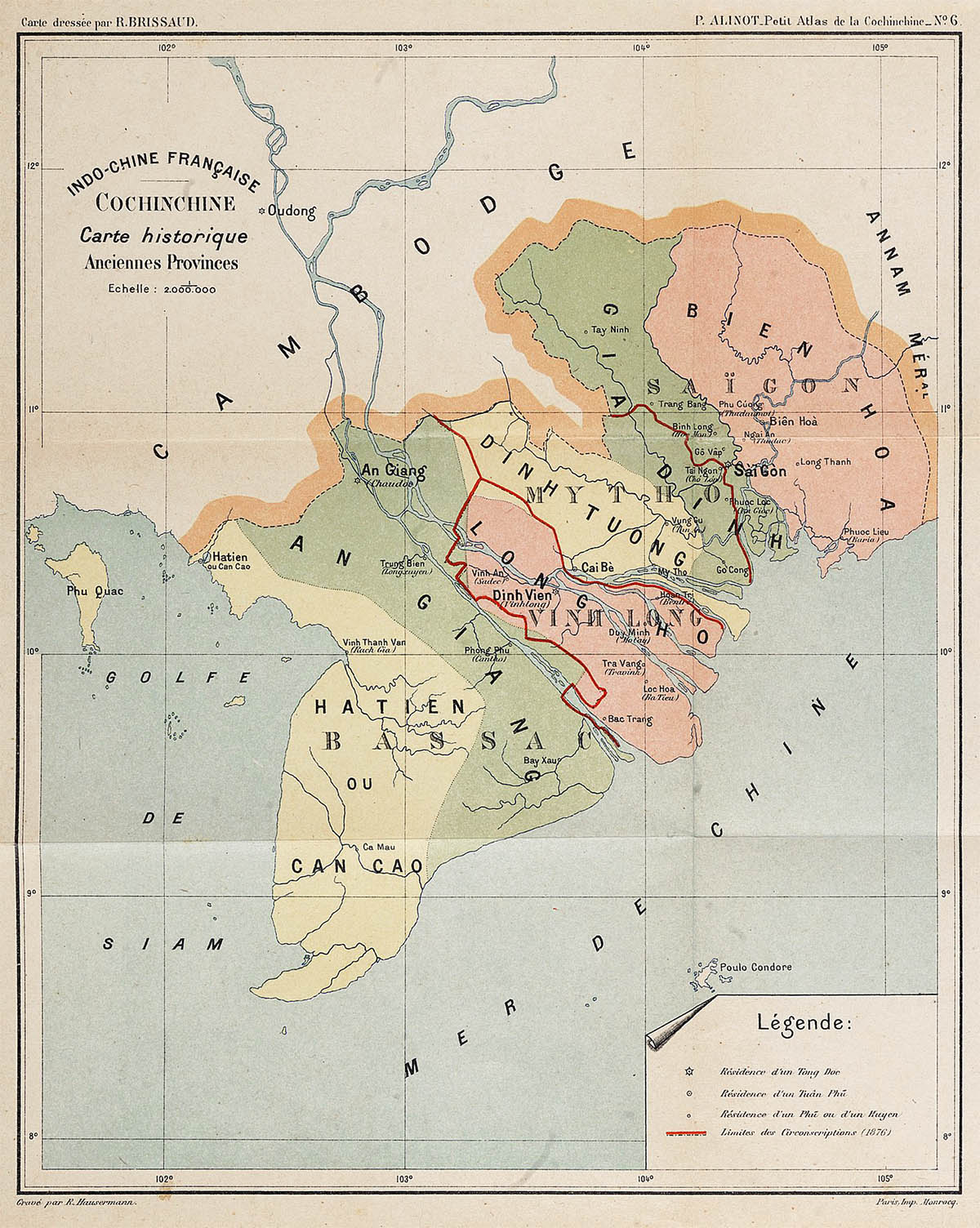
Cochinchina in 1876

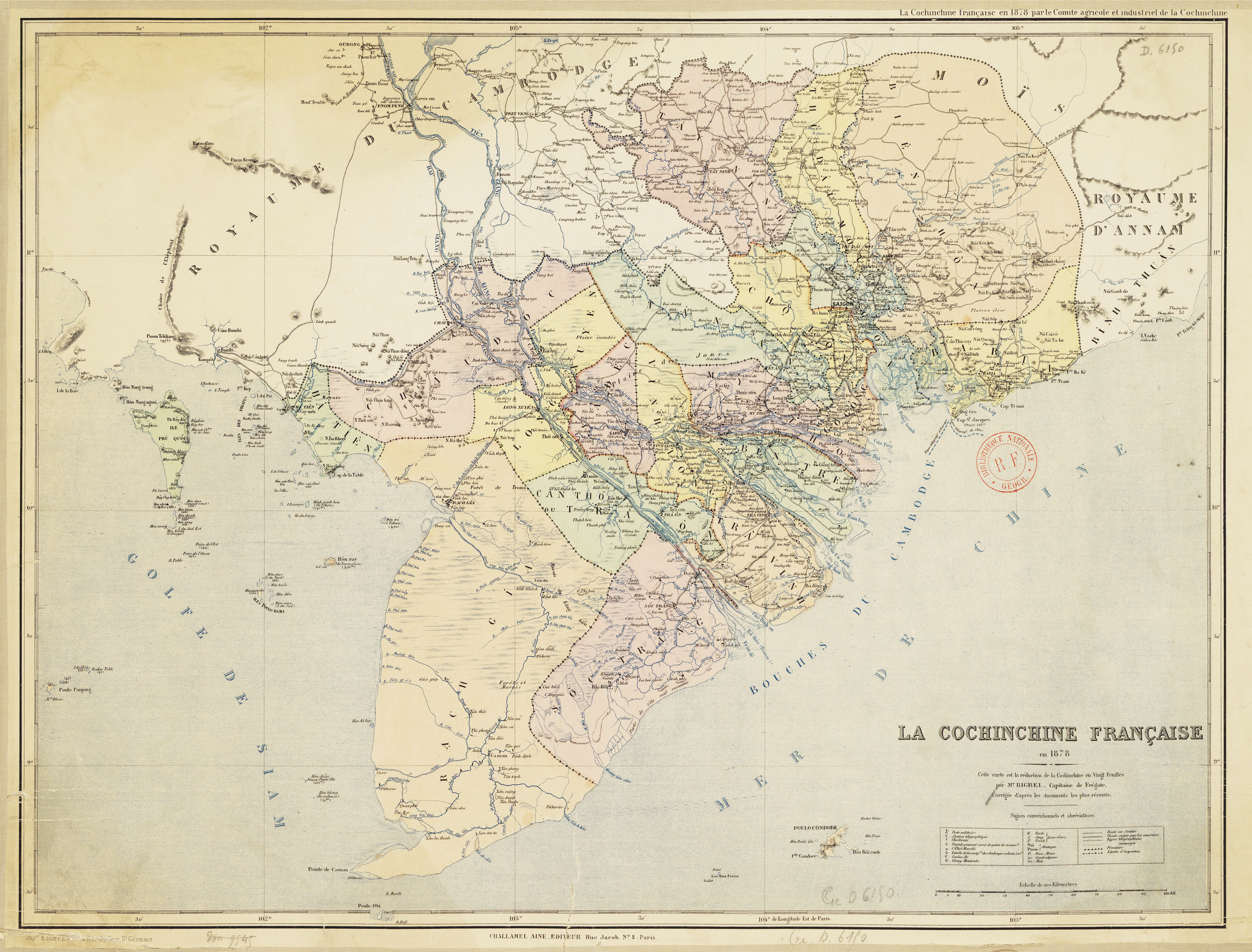
Cochinchina in 1878

Cochinchina in 1882

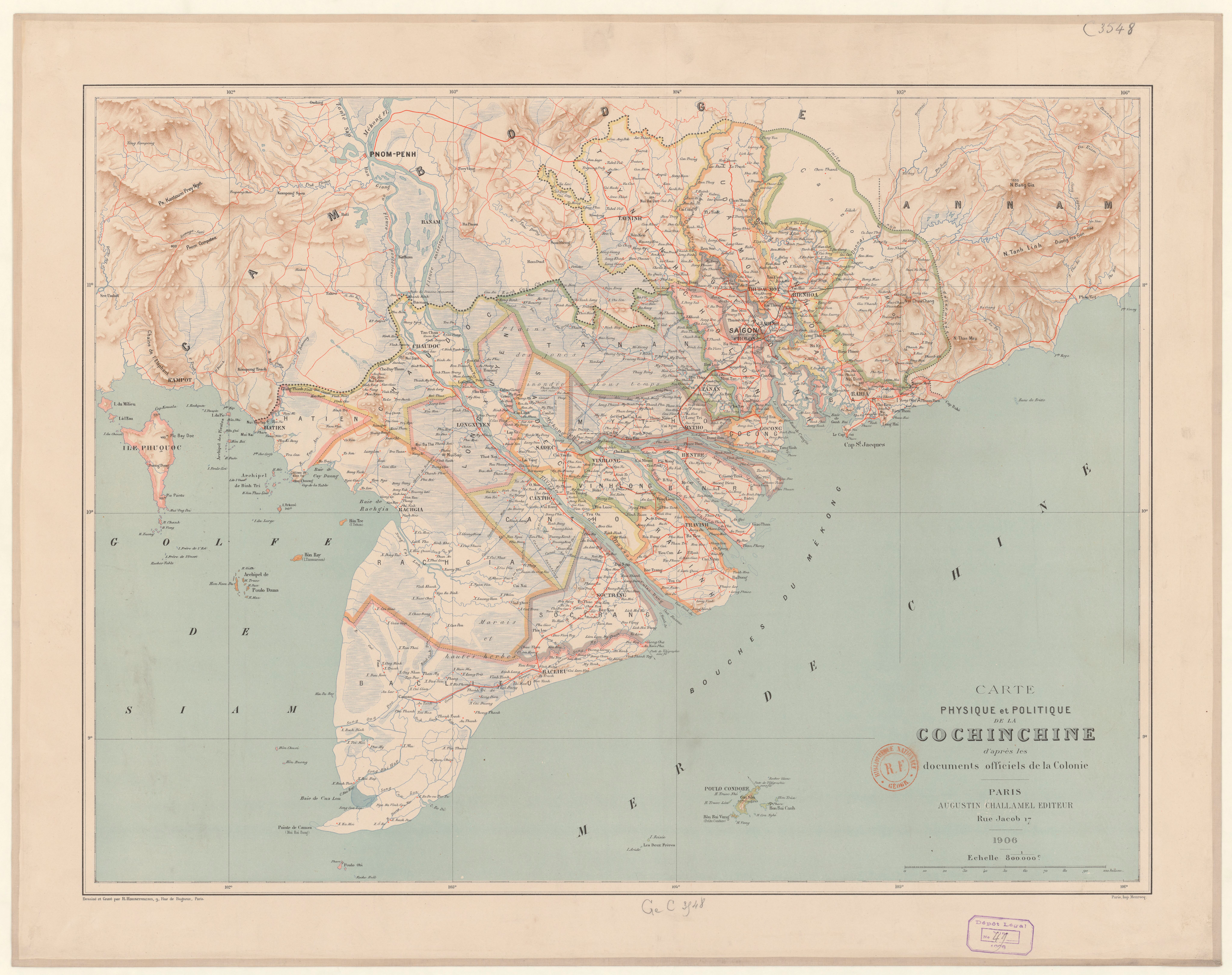
Cochinchina in 1906

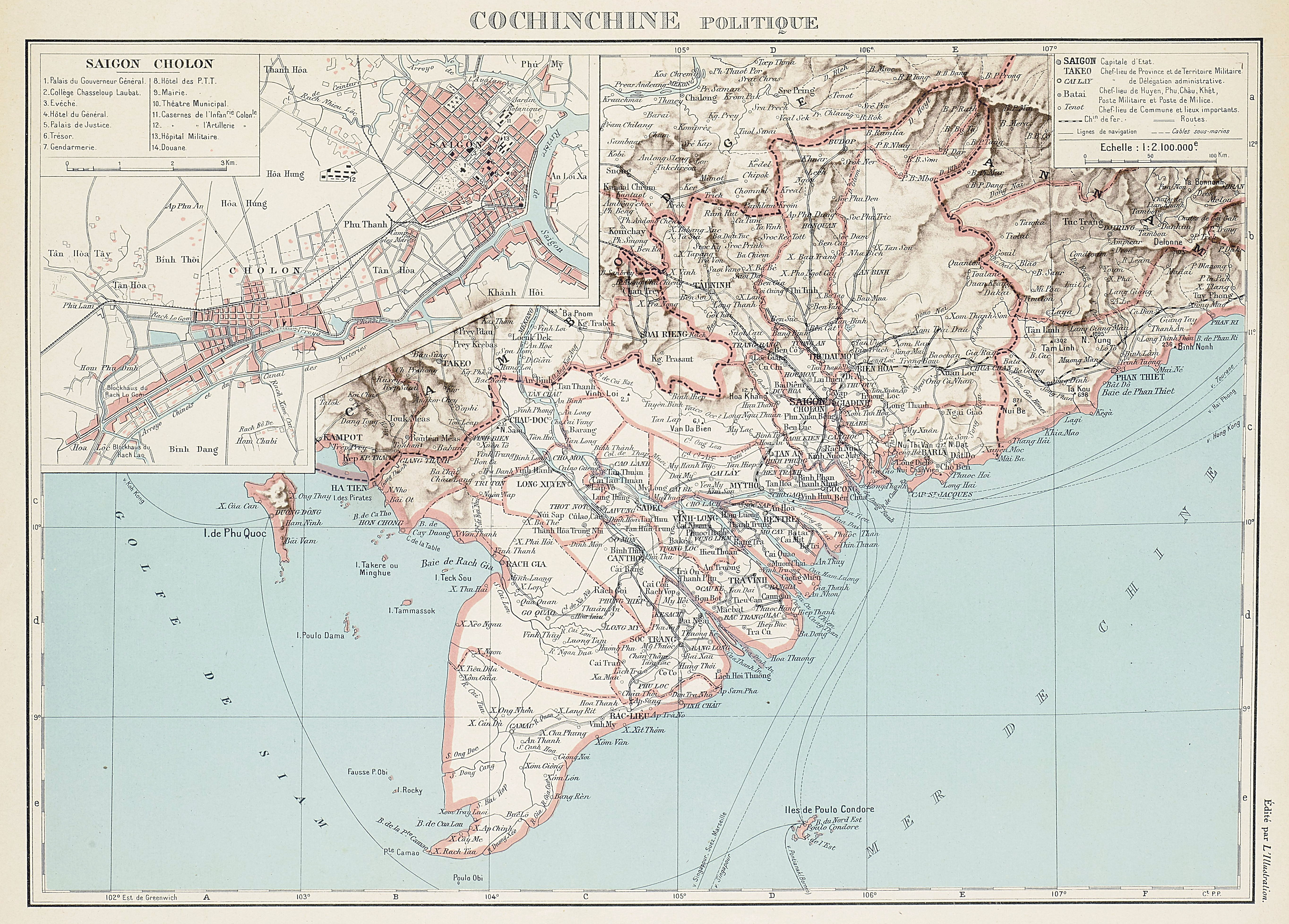
Cochinchina in 1929

== See also ==
- Tonkin
- Southern Vietnam
- South Vietnam
- Mekong Delta
- Kampuchea Krom
- Names of Vietnam
