= Langeland (surname) =

Langeland is a Norwegian surname. Notable people with the surname include:

- Arne Langeland (born 1928), Norwegian jurist, civil servant, and diplomat
- Hallgeir H. Langeland (born 1955), Norwegian politician for the Socialist Left Party
- Henrik Langeland, (born 1972), Norwegian novelist
- Kjeld Langeland (1920–1973), Norwegian politician for the Conservative Party
- Knud Langeland (1813–1886), American newspaper editor and politician
- Kurt-Arne Langeland (born 1969), Norwegian politician
- Olav Rasmussen Langeland (1904–1981), Norwegian politician for the Centre Party
- Oliver H. Langeland (1887–1958), Norwegian military officer and civil servant
- Rasmus Olsen Langeland (1873–1954), Norwegian Minister of Labour 1931-1933
- Sinikka Langeland (born 1961), Norwegian traditional folk singer

== See also ==
- Langeland (disambiguation)
