= Langeland (disambiguation) =

Langeland is a Danish island.

Langeland may also refer to:

== People ==
- Abel, Lord of Langeland (1252–1279), son of King Abel of Denmark
- Eric Longlegs, Lord of Langeland (1272–1310), son of Eric I, Duke of Schleswig
- Langeland (surname), Norwegian surname

== Places ==
- Langeland Municipality, consisting mainly of the island of Langeland
- Langeland (Bad Driburg), a district of Bad Driburg, Germany

== Ships ==
- HDMS Langeland (1808), a ship transferred to Norwegian ports from Denmark
- MV Langeland, a Norwegian cargo ship

== See also ==
- Langelands Festival, a family festival in Denmark
