= Charles Alfred Kellett =

Charles Alfred Kellett (25 November 1818 in Plymouth, Devonshire – 10 January 1869) was a British Master Mariner famous for having sailed the Chinese junk Keying from China, around the Cape of Good Hope to the United States and England between 1846 and 1848.

Charles Kellett served on HMS Spey between September 1833 and November 1839 as Boy and Seaman. He later served as Mate, Chief Mate and Master on several ships including the Psyche, Emily Jane, Will o'the wisp and Corcyra.

He married Louisa Jane in 1840 in Liverpool, Lancashire, England.

He sailed the Keying from Hong Kong to London in 1847/48 and then onto the United States. The voyage was very hard, and an amazing feat of sailing. In honour of the event, Queen Victoria had a number of medals struck to commemorate the event. The Keying was a much visited vessel in New York and Boston where she put in for supplies after a difficult voyage, and she created a great stir in London when she eventually docked. There is little mention of Charles by name in the documents surrounding the voyage – he is merely "Captain Kellett", but a Bill passed in the US House of Representatives uses his name in full when declaring that all costs relating to the "Keying" be waived.

On 17 September 1853, he departed England aboard the Northfleet with his wife to return to Auckland in New Zealand on 2 February 1854. He later settled in Fort William, Bengal, India where he died on 10 January 1869. He was succeeded by his son Sydney Stanford Kellett and two twin children Charles Kellett and Louisa Kellett.
