= Keying (ship) =

Chinese trading junk that sailed to Europe

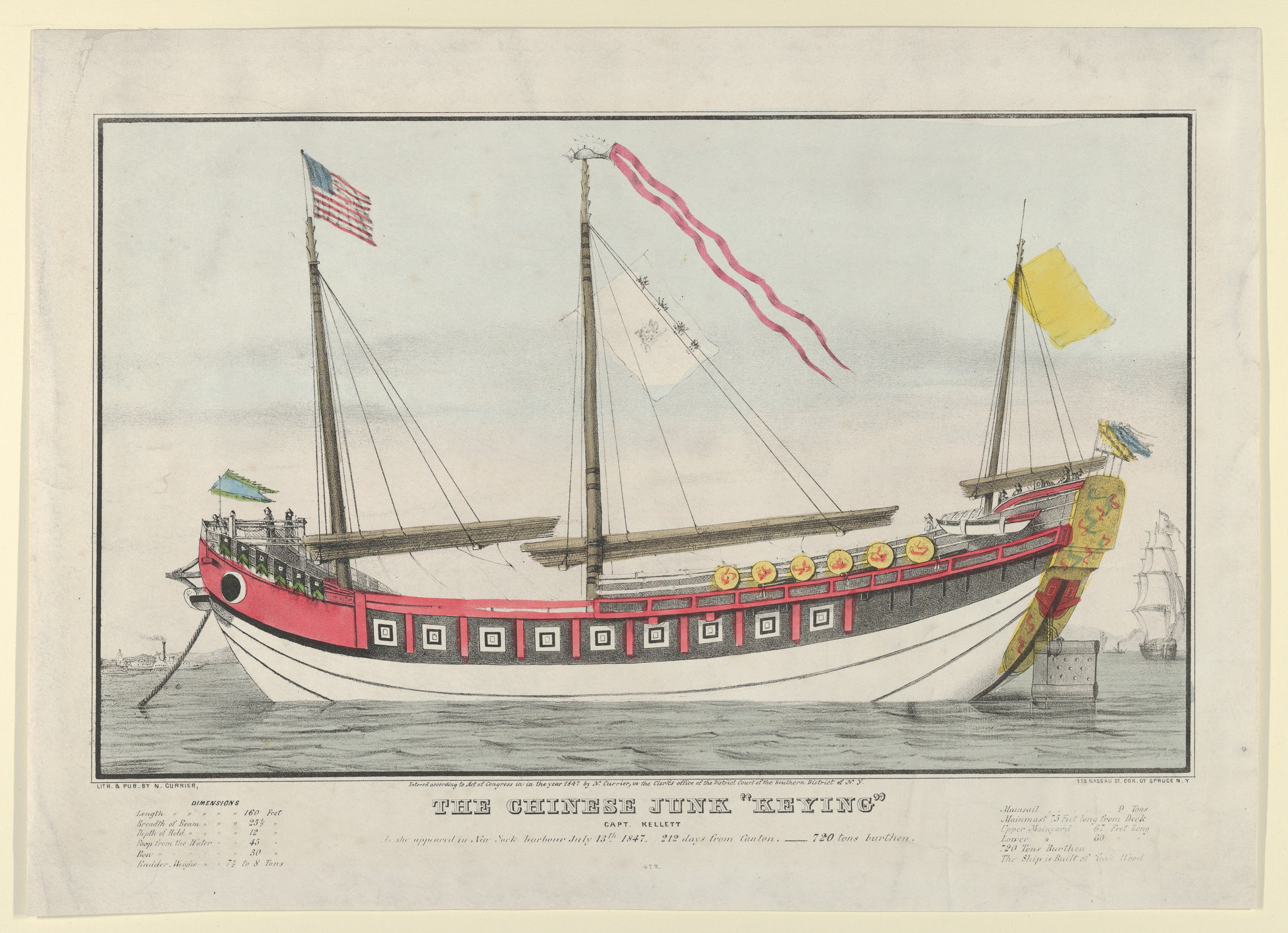
- "Keying" in New York harbour, July 13th, 1847.

History
- Name: Keying
- Fate: Broken up

General characteristics
- Class & type: Junk
- Tons burthen: 700–800 tons
- Length: 160 feet (48.77 m)
- Beam: 33 feet (10.06 m)
- Depth of hold: 16 feet (4.88 m)
- Propulsion: Three-masted junk rig
- Complement: 42
- Armament: 20 cannons
- Notes: Chinese teak used for the construction

Keying
- Traditional Chinese: 耆英
Transcriptions
Yue: Cantonese
- Yale Romanization: Kèih yīng
- Jyutping: Kei^{4} jing^{1}

Keying (Chinese: 耆英, p Qíyīng) was a three-masted, 800-ton Fuzhou Chinese trading junk which sailed from China around the Cape of Good Hope to the United States and Britain between 1846 and 1848. Her voyage was significant as it was one of the earliest instances of a Chinese sailing vessel making a transoceanic journey to the Western world. It served as a cultural exchange and offered Western audiences a glimpse into Chinese maritime traditions and craftsmanship.

== History and voyages ==
Keying had been purchased in August 1846 in secrecy by British businessmen in Hong Kong, defying a Chinese law prohibiting the sale of Chinese ships to foreigners. She was renamed after the Manchu official Keying. Keying was manned by 12 British and 30 Chinese sailors (the latter all Cantonese). She was commanded by Captain Charles Alfred Kellett, also British.

=== Hong Kong ===
Keying left Hong Kong in December 1846. Before her departure she was visited by Sir John Davis, the Governor of Hong Kong; Admiral Sir Thomas Cochrane, and officers of the fleet, the Commander-in-Chief and most of the principal residents of the Colony.

=== Cape of Good Hope and St Helena ===
She rounded the Cape of Good Hope in March 1847, 114 days out, having been delayed by strong westerly gales, and a severe hurricane.

After 17 days at sea she anchored at St Helena in April 1847.

=== New York ===
Keying in 1848. This depiction exaggerates the curvature of the hull.

She remained at St Helena for some time before taking course to Sandy Hooks and then arriving in New York City in July 1847. The Keying was the first ship from China to visit New York. She moored off the Battery on the southern tip of Manhattan and was received with great fanfare. No less than seven thousand visitors went on board of her every day. She remained in New York for several months. The Chinese crew of Keying were understandably angry as they had signed on only for an eight-month voyage to Singapore and Batavia (now Jakarta). Twenty-six of them left Keying and returned to Canton on board the Candace, which sailed 6 October 1847.

P. T. Barnum had a copy of Keying built in Hoboken (Barnum claimed he had it towed from China), and exhibited it with a crew which may have included some of the Keying Chinese. However the Brooklyn Eagle described Barnum's crew as "one third white and two thirds negroes or mulattoes", so probably no real Keying crew were present.

=== Boston ===
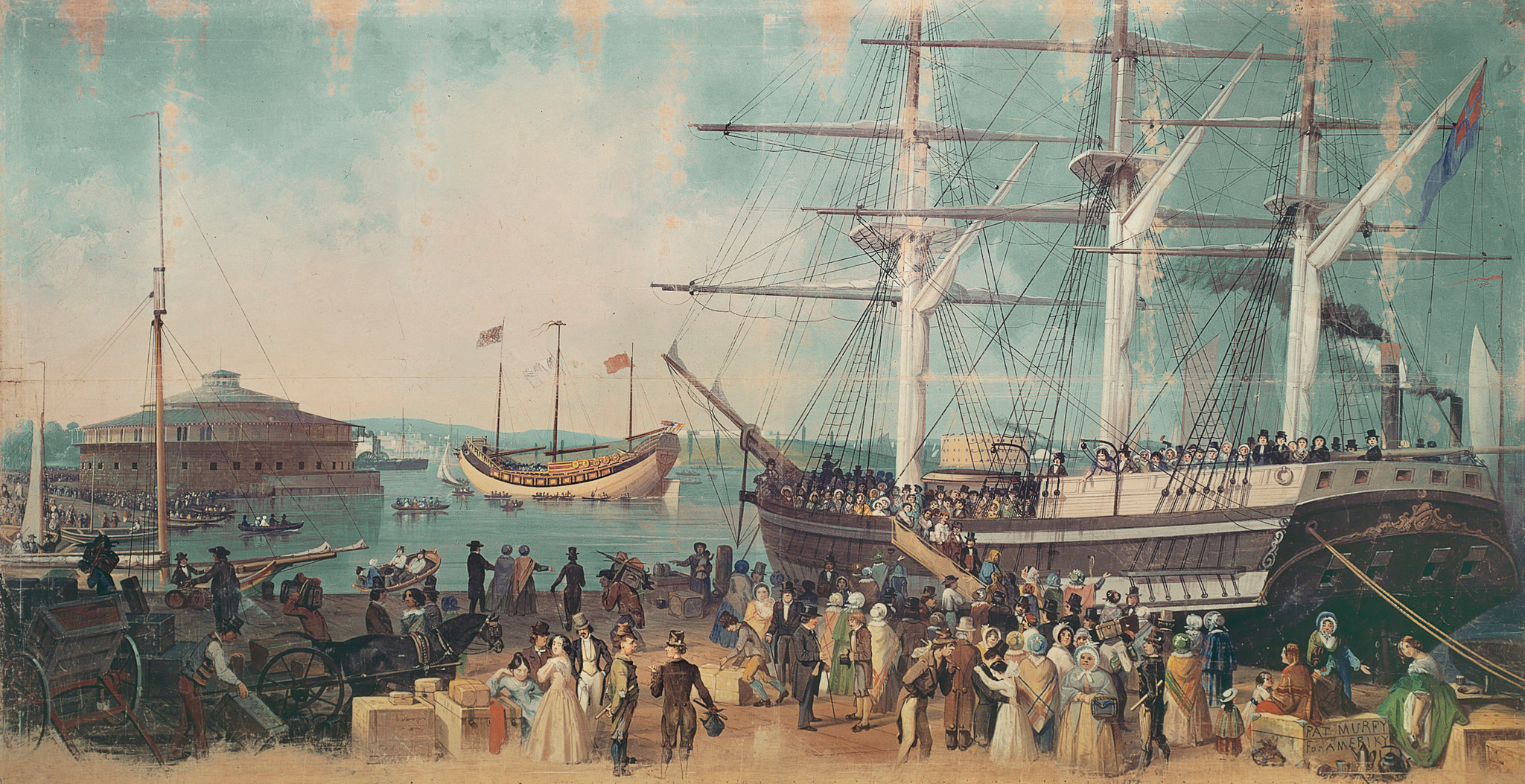
"The Bay and Harbor of New York" by Samuel Waugh (1814–1885), depicting the Junk Keying moored in New York Harbor in 1847 (watercolor on canvas, c. 1853–1855, Museum of the City of New York).

Keying also moored in Boston on 18 November 1847, by the Charles River Bridge, according to the Boston Evening Transcript of 1847. She was visited by many people, with as many as four to five thousand on Thanksgiving Day.

=== British visit ===
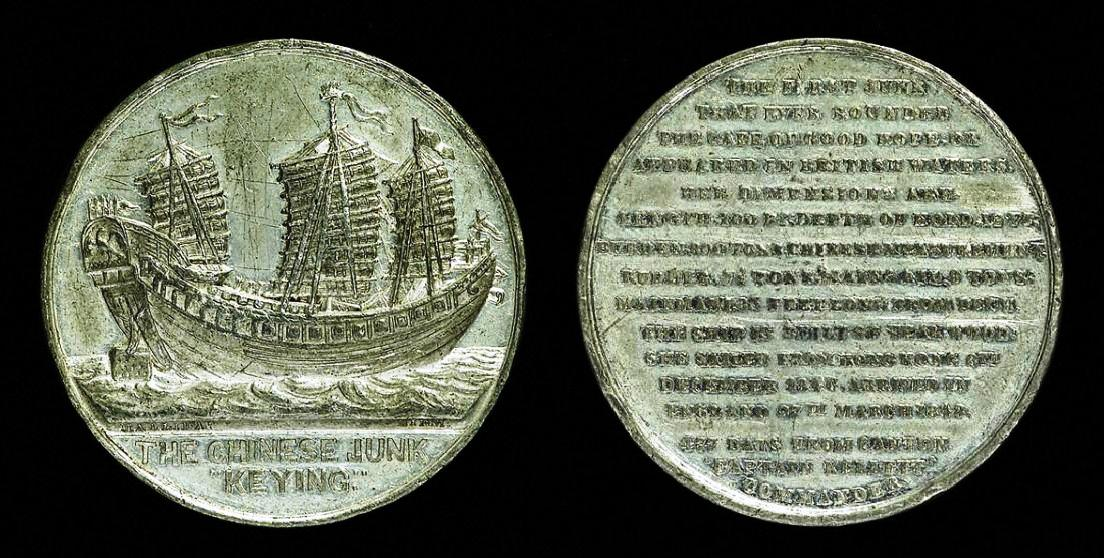
The medal made for the arrival of the Junk Keying in Britain.

Keying next sailed on 17 February 1848 for Britain. A storm on 28 February wrecked her two boats, ripped the foresail, and disabled the hardwood ironbound rudder, which was hung in the Chinese manner without gudgeons or pintles. During the repair of the rudder the second mate drowned.

Keying was fast, as was noted by the press:

The Keying next visited Boston, whence she sailed direct for London on 17 February last, and arrived in St Aubin's Bay, on 15 March, having performed the voyage, from land to land, in 21 days — a short period even for the American packet-ships. (Illustrated London News, 1848)

Keying reached Britain in March 1848, and a medal was made in honor of her arrival. The obverse of the medal gives the following account:

The first junk that ever rounded the Cape of Good Hope, or appeared in British waters. Her dimensions are length 160ft. Depth of hold: 12ft. Burden: 800 tons Chinese measurement. Rudder 7½ tons, mainsail 9 tons. Mainmast 85ft long from deck. The ship is built of teak wood. She sailed from Hong Kong 6 December 1846, arrived in England 27 March 1848, 477 days from Canton. "Captain Kellet", commander.

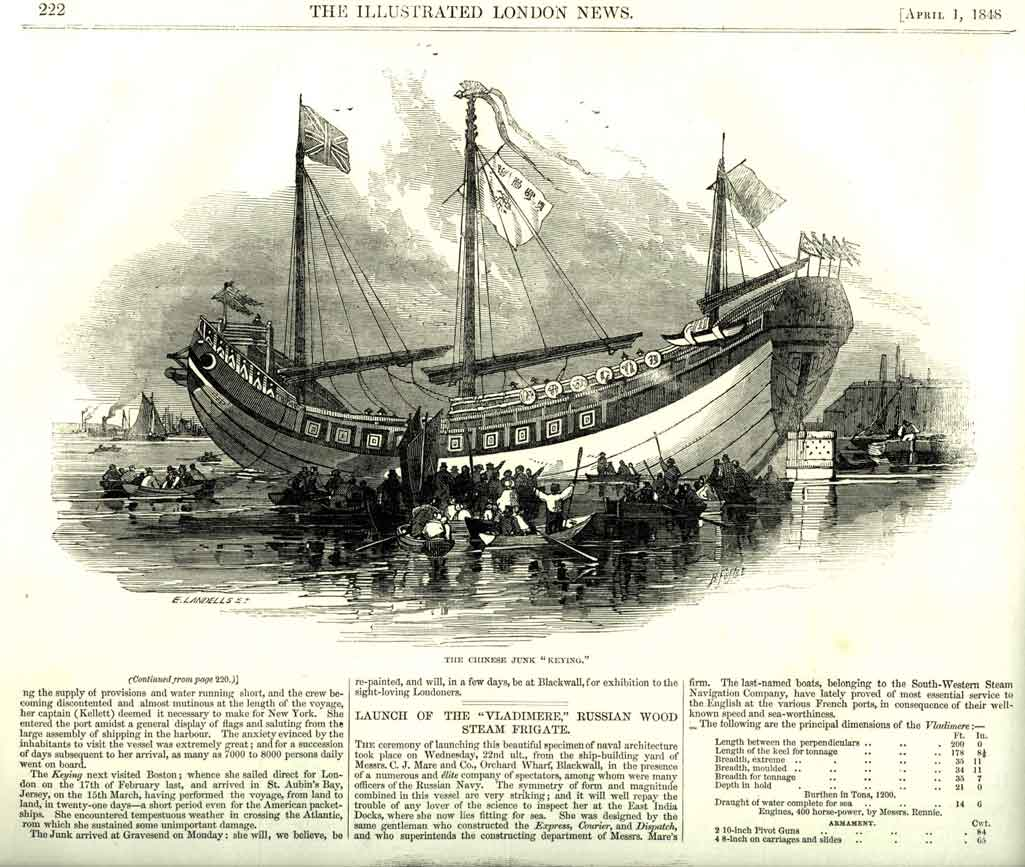
Illustrated London News article, 1 April 1848.

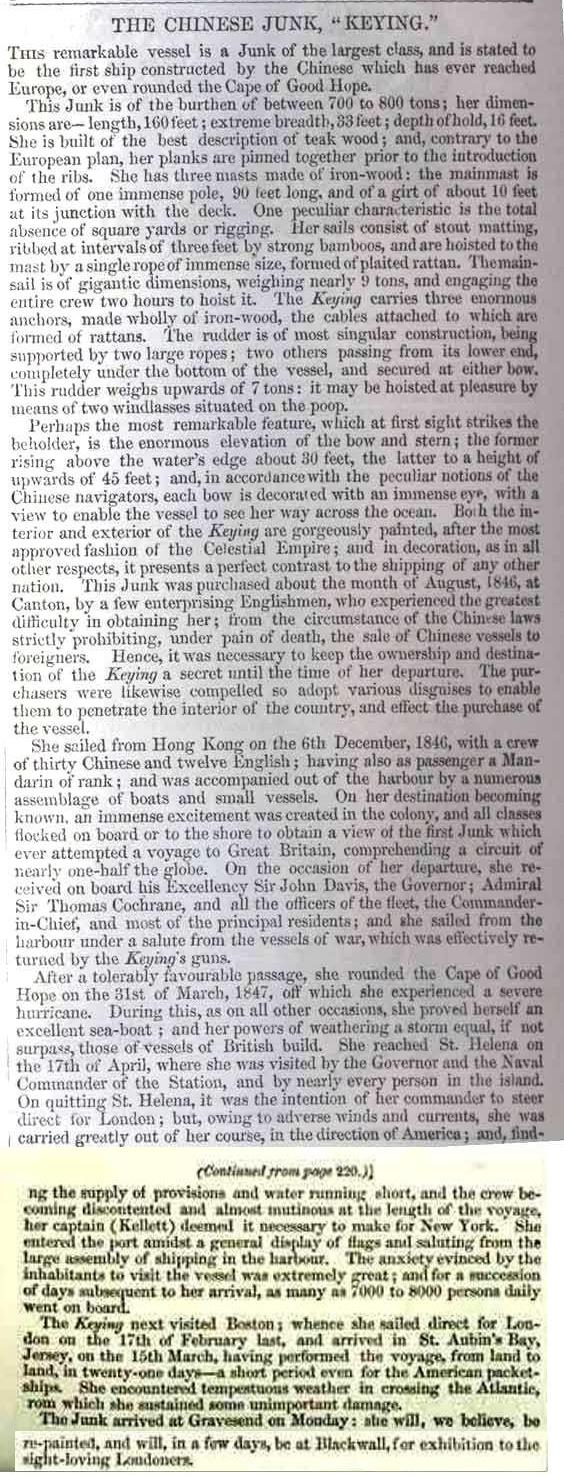
Illustrated London News, 1848, full article.

Keying was praised by the British as excellent in seaworthiness, and practically superior to their own:

She proved herself an excellent sea-boat; and her powers of weathering a storm equal, if not surpass, those of vessels of British build. (Illustrated London News, 1848)

She lay in the Thames at Blackwall. A multitude visited the ship, including Queen Victoria and other members of the royal family.

The Illustrated London News of 29 July 1848 described the visits to the Keying as follows:

The ROYAL CHINESE JUNK "KEYING" manned by a Chinese Crew. Visitors received by a Mandarin of rank and Chinese Artist of celebrity. Grand Saloon, gorgeously furnished in the most approved style of the Celestial Empire. Collection of Chinese Curiosities, &c. The "Keying" is now open for Exhibition, from Ten to six, in the East India Docks, adjoining the Railway and Steam-boat Pier, Blackwall.—Admission, One Shilling.

ADMISSION, ONE SHILLING.—During the limited period which the ROYAL CHINESE JUNK will remain in London, the charge for admission will be reduced to One Shilling. This most interesting Exhibition, which has been justly called "the greatest novelty in Europe," has been visited by her Majesty the Queen, all the Royal Family, and an immense number of persons, including nearly all the nobility and foreigners of distinction in London. Junk Tickets, including fare and admission, are issued by the Blackwall and Eastern Counties Railways. Omnibuses direct, and conveyance also by Steam-boat from all the Piers between Westminster and Woolwich; fare 4d. Catalogues obtainable only on board, price 6d.

The Times also reported Keying's visit:

There is not a more interesting Exhibition in the vicinity of London than the Chinese Junk: one step across the entrance, and you are in the Chinese world; you have quitted the Thames for the vicinity of Canton.

=== Specifications ===
Keying's specifications was recorded differently between British and American sources.

	American	British
Weight (burthen)	720 tonnes (1,587,328 lb)	700 to 800 tonnes (1,500,000 to 1,800,000 lb)
Length	160 feet (48.77 m)	160 feet (48.77 m)
Breadth	25.5 feet (7.77 m)	33 feet (10.06 m)
Depth of hold	12 feet (3.66 m)	16 feet (4.88 m)
Bow height	30 feet (9.14 m)	About 30 feet (9.14 m)
Poop height	45 feet (13.72 m)	More than 45 feet (13.72 m)
Rudder weight	7.5 to 8 tonnes (17,000 to 18,000 lb)	More than 7 tonnes (15,432 lb)
Mainmast height	75 feet (22.86 m) from deck	90 feet (27.43 m)
Mainsail weight	9 tonnes (19,842 lb)	Nearly 9 tonnes (19,842 lb)

=== Sale and final fate ===
The Keying was sold to Messrs Crippin & Forster of Rock Ferry, Cheshire and towed from London to the river Mersey by the steam tug Shannon, arriving 14 May 1853. It was moored at the Rock Ferry slipway for public exhibition. On 29 September 1853, Keying was preparing to leave for foreign ports in three weeks. But instead it was dismantled "for research" at the shipyard of Redhead, Harling, and Brown.

The Plymouth and Devonport weekly journal for Thursday, 6 December 1855 reported

The Chinese junk once a most popular attractive exhibition, is now rotting neglected and uncared for on the shore at Tranmere Ferry opposite Liverpool.

== Commemoration ==
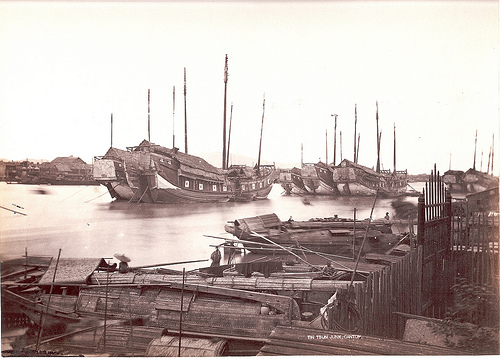
Large trading junks moored off the waterfront of Guangzhou towards the end of the 19th. Albumen print

A large-scale model of the Keying is on display at the Hong Kong Maritime Museum, at Central Ferry Pier 8. This model was based on contemporary reports and images allied to a comprehensive analysis of traditional Fuzhou junk lines. The model was constructed on a 1 to 12 scale. The model was also intentionally aged to look like a vessel that had seen service prior to is famous journey.

The model is thought by some to be incorrect: the shape of the hull lacks the great curvature which is clearly and consistently shown in some of the many contemporary illustrations of the original vessel. However, the Currier print made at the time (part of the exhibit) does not show this. The exaggerations of other renditions probably resulted from western artists' being confused by the unfamiliar style of Keying's hull, particularly the high 'wings' either side of the bow, typical of the Fuzhou style, and the similarly elevated bulwarks of the poop deck.

The actual sheerline of Fuzhou junks is not so extreme. Much of the confusion with respect to the Keying may come from reported bow and stern heights above the waterline that may have been for the tops of 'wings' and 'poop', not of the weather deck at bow and stern. The exaggerated measurements in most contemporary reports suggest it was the former, not the latter.

The museum model unquestionably fits the accounts of Keying's sea-keeping qualities better than a model with the bizarrely exaggerated curvatures shown in other contemporary illustrations. Such curvature was unknown in similar vessels: the acutely distorted waterlines that would result when heeled would have rendered the vessel unmanageable.

These large trading junks moored off the waterfront of Guangzhou towards the end of the 19th century would have been broadly similar to the Keying and give us a better idea of how she may really have appeared than the contemporary images of her by western artists.

== See also ==
- Tek Sing, a larger Chinese junk sunk in Indonesia during the 19th century
- Princess Taiping, a modern replica of a Ming-dynasty junk that sailed from Taiwan to San Francisco and (almost) back in 2009
