= MV Demas Victory =

Oil and gas rig supply ship that sank in the Persian Gulf in June 2009

- Map of Qatar where the ship sank offshore in the Persian Gulf.

History

St. Vincent & The Grenadines
- Name: Demas Victory
- Owner: Demas Marine Inc.
- Operator: Midgulf Offshore Ship Chartering LLC
- Laid down: 1979
- In service: January 2005
- Fate: Capsized in Persian Gulf, 30 June 2009

General characteristics

MV Demas Victory was a Dubai-based supply ship which sailed to offshore oil and gas platforms. It capsized 10 nautical miles off the coast of the Qatari capital city of Doha on Tuesday 30 June 2009 at 6:30 a.m. local time. The disaster resulted in over 30 missing of the 35 reported to be on board. Only five were rescued, and six bodies recovered. It was feared that many of the passengers were sleeping in their cabins, and those on deck were rescued.

== Last voyage ==
On 30 June 2009, the captain put in a request to re-enter Doha Port, and entered the channel of Doha's harbour; however, officials advised that the ship remain at anchor due to the rough conditions. The ship capsized within three minutes around this time following a huge wave and strong wind.

At the time of its sinking, the MV Demas Victory was carrying two caterers, nine crew members, and two dozen employees of the charterer HBK Power Cleaning - twelve from Nepal, eleven from India and one from Bangladesh. Midgulf Offshore Ship Chartering LLC had been operating the ship since January 2005.

== See also ==
- Maritime disasters
- List of shipwrecks in 2009
