= Son River (Vietnam) =

Tributary of Gianh River in Vietnam

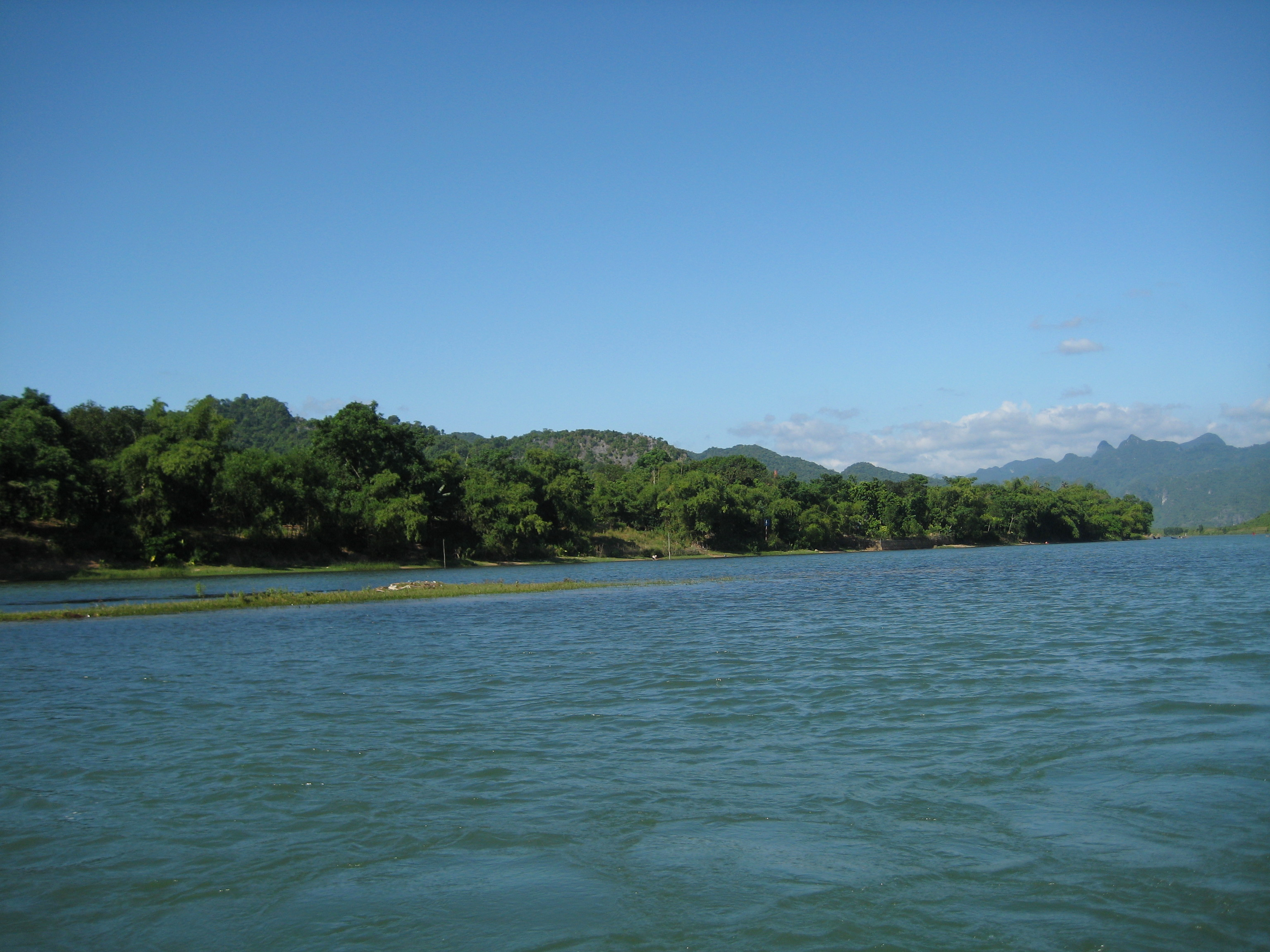
Son River near Phong Nha-Kẻ Bàng

Son River or Troc River (Vietnamese: Sông Son or sông Tróc) (lit. Lipstick River, because its water is red in flooding season) is a tributary of Gianh River in Quảng Bình Province, North Central Coast region, Vietnam. This river runs in the territory of Quảng Bình Province. The upstream of this river with the length of 7729 m runs underground in limestone mountains of Phong Nha-Kẻ Bàng National Park. Son River makes confluence with Gianh River near Ba Đồn town of Quảng Trạch District before emptying into South China Sea.
