= 2009 Gianh River boat accident =

Maritime incident in Vietnam

Coordinates: 17°45′25″N 106°22′53″E

The 2009 Gianh River boat accident occurred on 25 January 2009 on the Gianh River near Quảng Hải Village, in the Quảng Trạch District of Quảng Bình Province in Vietnam. A wooden boat sank 20 meters from the shore in strong currents during windy conditions. There were reportedly over 80 people on board, yet the boat was capable of carrying only 20. The accident caused 42 deaths and five people were missing. The Prime Minister of Vietnam sent his condolences to the victims' families. The government of Quảng Bình Province decided to cancel the fireworks supposed to take place at midnight the same day, on the eve of Tết, the New Year Day in Vietnam.

== Background ==
On January 25, 2009, approximately 40 people drowned when an overloaded ferry sank in the Gianh River early in the morning. According to witnesses, the small ferry was carrying about 80 people, though it was only meant to carry 20. Most of the victims were women and children, including 3 women that were pregnant. At least 36 passengers survived, a few by swimming to shore and others being rescued, but several are still missing. According to Luong Ngoc Binh, provincial communist party chief, "The waves on the river were big, the wind was strong and it was cold, so it was very difficult for people to survive." The boat was crowded because people were trying to cross the river to get to the market. They were rushing to buy things for the Lunar New Year festivities.

The tragedy happened on the eve of the Tet Lunar New Year, the biggest annual festival in Vietnam. It was supposed to reunite families for celebration meals and to pray for good luck in the year ahead. According to Phan Lam Phuong, the governor of Quang Binh, “It’s a tragedy for the province, it should have been time to celebrate the Lunar New Year.” The provincial government decided to cancel the Lunar New Year fireworks show. It was one of the worst ferry accidents in Quang Binh province.

According to Vietnamese News Agency, following the event, the Ministry of Transport suggested that the Chairman of Quang Binh region determine who was to blame for the tragedy. Some families of the victims were upset that the construction of a bridge was supposed to be finished two years before the accident. The bridge was to be constructed around one kilometer from the accident site and might have prevented the tragedy. Phan Thanh Ha, provincial police chief of Quang Binh said, “Authorities will give 10 million dong ($600) to the families of each victim.”

Gianh River is a river located in the Quang Binh region of Vietnam's North Central Coast. It is the biggest river in Quang Binh, so the residents call it the mother river. Gianh River's water can be clear and still, but its average steepness is 19.2%. So, throughout the flood season from September to November, the stream is brutal. According to the magazine Vietnam Heritage, “Quang Binh people say only those who have witnessed the crest of its floods know its power and ferocity.” The river may be dangerous when it comes to flooding, and in 2009, 40 people died due to a boat capsizing.
