= Mohammad Shawkat Imam =

Bangladesh Army colonel (1961–2009)

- মোহাম্মদ শাওকাত ইমাম
- Born: 20 May 1961; Tangail, East Pakistan, Pakistan
- Died: 25 February 2009 (aged 47); Pilkhana, Dhaka, Bangladesh
- Cause of death: Assassination
- Alma mater: Military Training Bangladesh Military Academy
- Spouse: Nuzhat Ahsan
- Children: 1
- Military career
- Allegiance: Bangladesh
- Branch: Bangladesh Army; Bangladesh Rifles
- Service years: 1984–2009
- Rank: Colonel
- Unit: Regiment of Artillery
- Commands: Sector Commander of BDR; CO of 5th Air Defence Artillery Regiment; CO of 23rd Rifles Battalion
- Conflicts: UNAMSIL; Bangladesh Rifles Revolt †

Mohammad Shawkat Imam was a colonel in the Bangladesh Army. He held numerous posts, including commander of UN peacekeeping operations. He was the sector commander of Bangladesh Rifles in Teknaf when he was killed in the 2009 Bangladesh Rifles Mutiny.

== Early life ==
Imam was born on 20 May 1961, in Tangail, East Pakistan (now Bangladesh).

== Career ==
Imam completed the Bangladesh Public Service Commission course. He served as commander of the Bangladesh Rifles battalion 23. After the pro-democracy protests in Myanmar in 2007, the Junta deported Bangladeshi monks. Colonel Shawkat Imam was in charge of the area at the time. Colonel Sakhawat was the Bangladesh Rifles (BDR) sector commander of Khagrachhari.

== Personal life ==
Imam married Nuzhat Ahsan, and had one daughter, Sumera Azreen.

== Death ==
Imam was killed in the 2009 Bangladesh Rifles Mutiny. He was buried with full state honours along with the other officers killed in the mutiny at the National Parade Square. Imam was buried in the Bangladesh Army Graveyard in Banani, Dhaka on 2 March 2009.
