= Kurt-Arne Langeland =

Norwegian politician

Kurt-Arne Langeland (born 25 August 1969) is a Norwegian politician for the Christian Democratic Party.

He served as a deputy representative to the Parliament of Norway from Hordaland during the terms 1993–1997 and 1997–2001. In total he met during 197 days of parliamentary session. Ahead of the 1997 election he was put forward by the nomination committee of Hordaland Christian Democratic Party as the third candidate on the election ballot, which was regarded as a good chance for a seat in Parliament. However, but at the nomination meeting he was edged out by Ingebrigt Sørfonn. As the Christian Democratic Party performed well in 1997 and achieved its highest vote tally ever, Langeland became first deputy throughout the term.

Langeland hails from Fjell Municipality and was also a member of Hordaland county council.
