= Princess Taiping (sailing vessel) =

Replica Chinese junk

Coordinates: 24°51′N 122°20′E

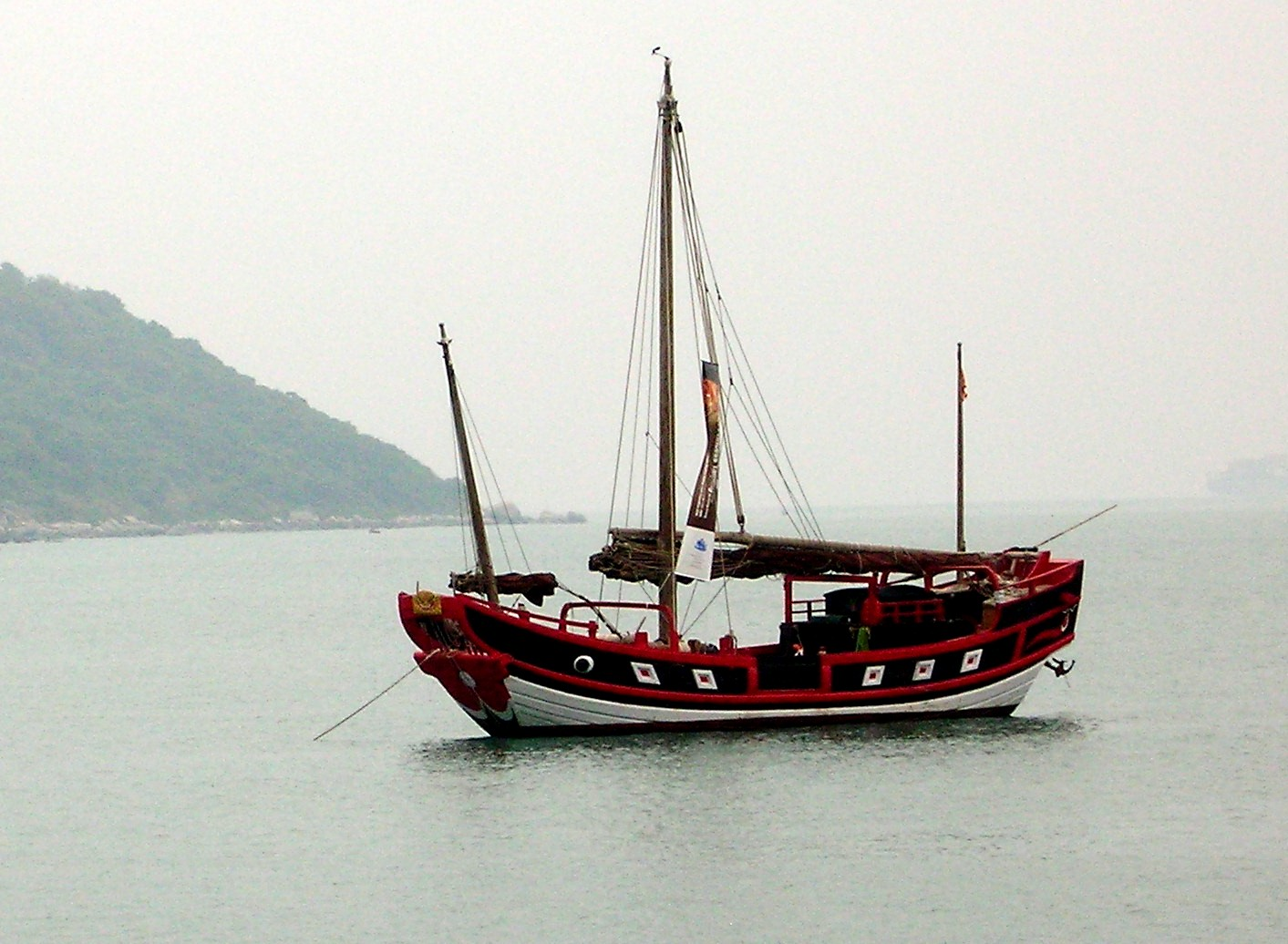
The Princess Taiping

The Princess Taiping (Chinese: 太平公主; pinyin: Tàipíng Gōngzhǔ) was a replica of a Ming Dynasty Chinese junk built for a sailing trip from China to the United States and back. The ship sank approximately 42 nautical miles (78 km) from its final destination on Saturday, 25 April 2009. If successful, it would have been the first ship of its kind known to have done so. (Fifty years earlier, a junk called Free China had been sailed to San Francisco but none had ever made the more difficult return journey to China.)

== History ==
The ship was commissioned by 61-year-old Liu Ningsheng ("Nelson Liu"), possibly the first Taiwanese person to ever circle the earth in a yacht, to demonstrate the plausibility of the theory that the Chinese explored the American West Coast decades before the voyages of Christopher Columbus. The ship was a replica of war ships in the navies of Zheng He and Koxinga. It was 54 feet (16 m) long and 13 feet (4.0 m) wide. Thirty craftsmen from Fuzhou, Quanzhou and Zhangzhou spent six years building the ship, without nuts and bolts, using traditional Chinese shipbuilding techniques. It was entirely wind-powered, with three cotton sails.

The ship was launched in June, 2008 from Xiamen, in the People's Republic of China. It set off on June 26 from Keelung, Taiwan, with Liu as skipper. It made 17,000 miles (27,000 km) of its trip, stopping in California, Hawaii, and Japan, among other places, before it was rammed by the Champion Express, a 650-foot (200 m) Liberian-flagged Norwegian chemical tanker, near the Su Ao Harbor in northeastern Taiwan, 20–30 miles from the end of its voyage back in Keelung. The Princess Taiping sank. Although the Champion Express did not stop to give assistance, Liu sent a distress signal by radio beacon. The skipper and all ten members of his international crew were rescued by a Taiwanese helicopter and rescue ship after several hours in the water.

At the time of the sinking, a similar replica of a Ming Dynasty vessel was under construction in Tainan. This replica named "Taiwan Cheng Kung" set sail from Anping Harbour on Saturday 4 December 2010 and travelled to the estuary of Luermen Creek in Taiwan.

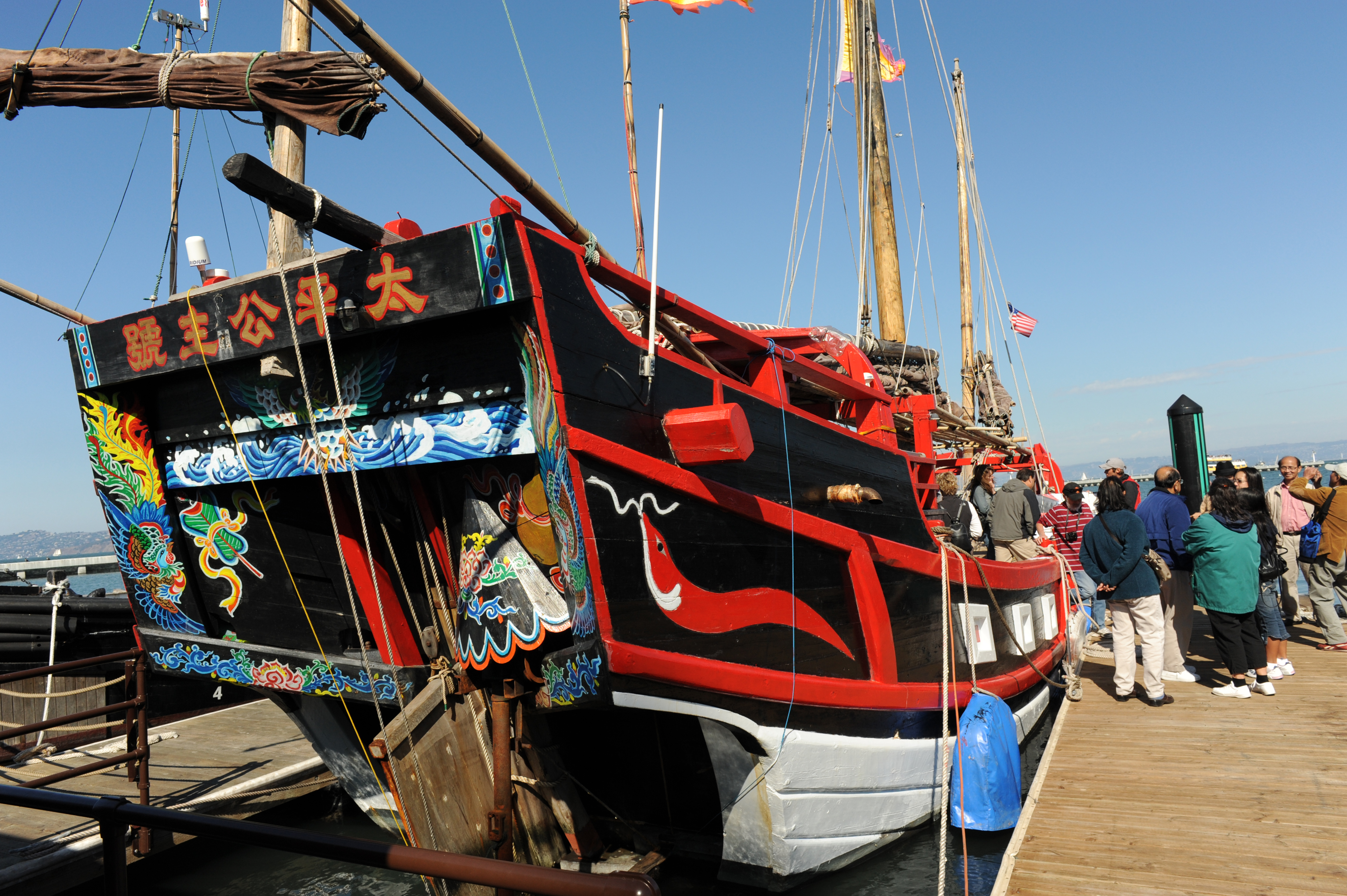
Docked at the Hyde Street Pier in San Francisco

== See also ==
- Keying (ship), junk that sailed from Hong Kong to London in New York in 1846-1848
- Richard Halliburton, an American adventurer who commissioned a junk in 1939; the Sea Dragon with him aboard disappeared mid-Pacific.
