= ML Happy =

ML Happy was an ill-fated ferry that sunk near Barisal City, Bangladesh on 19 February 2009. At least 39 people died in the sinking.
