= Gianh River =

River in Vietnam

Coordinates: 17°45′25″N 106°25′10″E

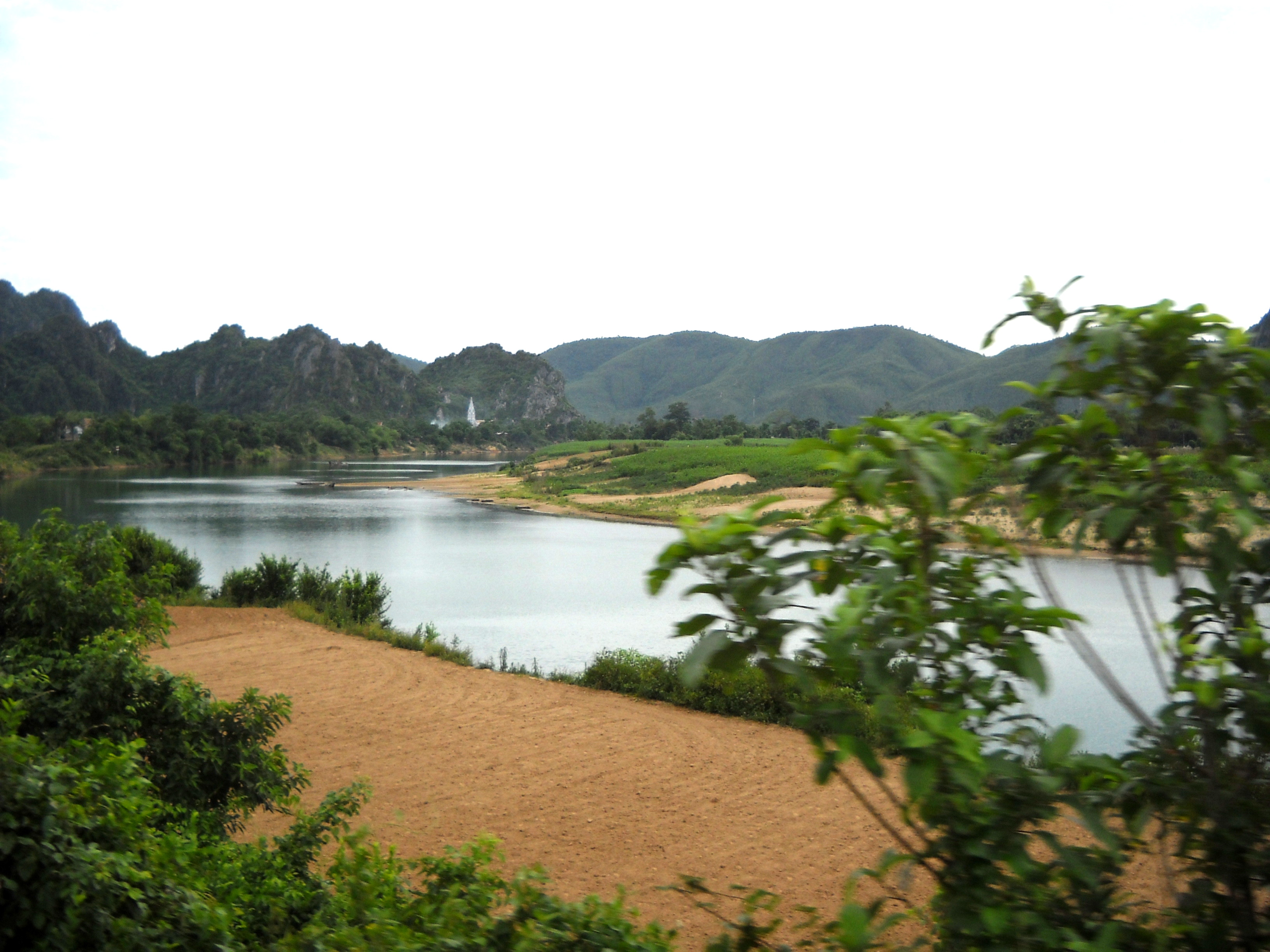
Gianh River

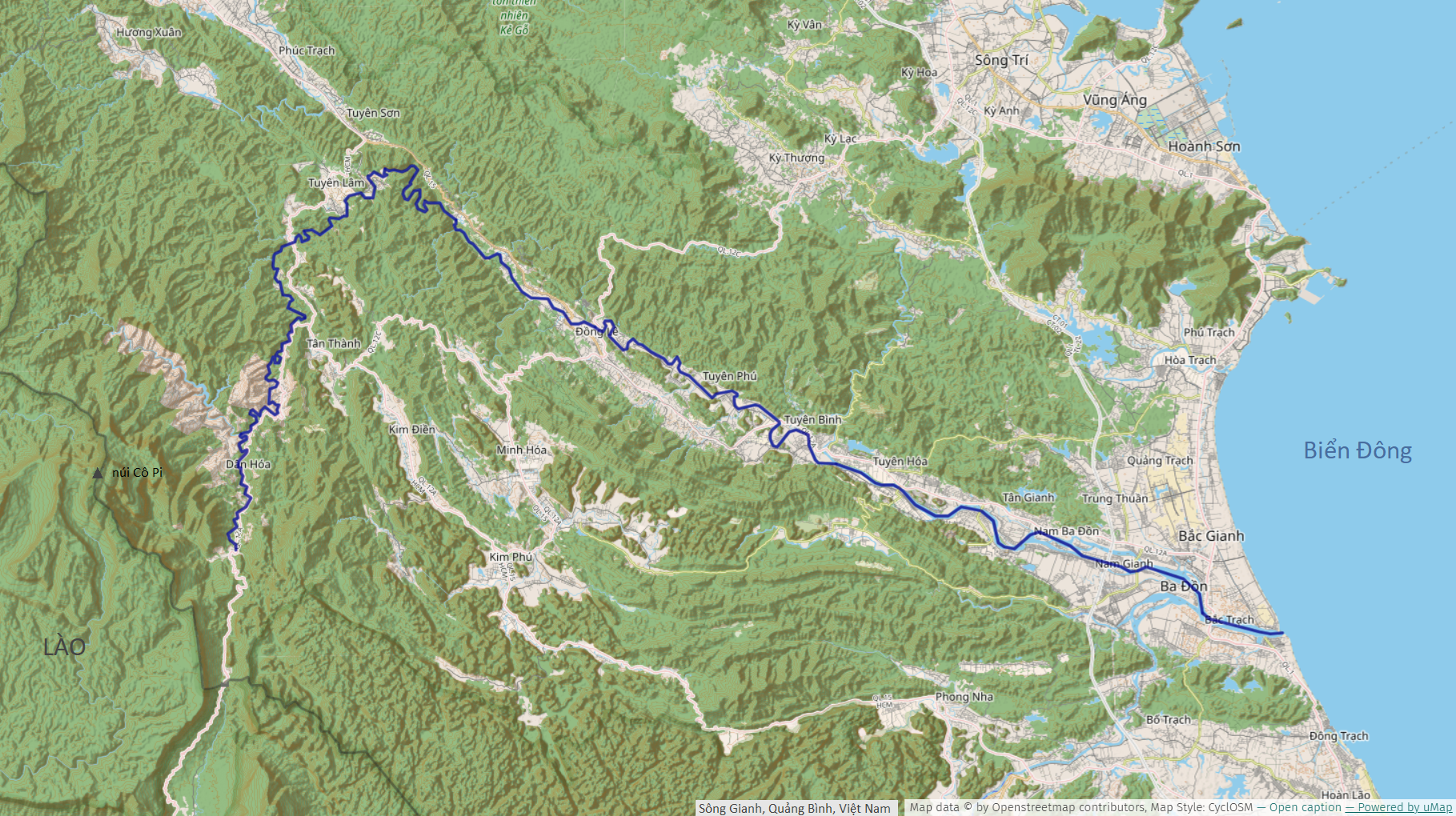
Gianh River with its main tributary Rao Nậy

The Gianh River (vernacular Vietnamese: sông Gianh, also known as Gianh giang; Sino-Vietnamese: Linh Giang 靈江) is a river in the Quảng Bình province of Vietnam's North Central Coast (Bắc Trung Bộ). The river is 268 kilometres (167 mi) in length.

The Gianh–Son River served as the boundary between Đàng Ngoài and Đàng Trong, ruled by rival families, during the partition of Vietnam in the 17th and 18th centuries following the Trịnh–Nguyễn War. The 17th parallel, used as the border between North Vietnam and South Vietnam from 1954 to 1975, was located just south of the Gianh River, at the Bến Hải River in Quảng Trị province.

== 2009 boat accident ==
On 25 January 2009 a boat accident took place on the river, resulting in the deaths of 42 people and the disappearance of five others.
