= MV Coco-4 =

Coordinates: 22.3485°N 90.6821°E

MV Coco-4 was a ferry that sunk near Bhola Island, Bangladesh on 27 November 2009, killing 75 people, out of more than a thousand on board, with several dozen more reported missing.

== History ==
The ferry sank on 28 November 2009 near Bhola Island. The ferry was overcrowded with people heading home before Eid. On 29 November, salvage ship M. V. Hamza raised the ferry, giving rescuers access to additional bodies on the lower decks of the ship. During these operations, rescuers were met by angry crowds upset at delays in rescue operations. According to a survivor, "The ferry sank just before midnight Friday, but rescuers did not arrive until the morning." It is still unclear what caused the ferry to sink, but a current theory states that it tipped to one side as a stampede occurred on board as the ferry approached dock. Shipping Minister Shajahan Khan told news agencies that "Officials had locked the ferry's exit gate as it approached the shore to find out whether anyone was travelling without a ticket. This triggered a stampede, causing the boat to tip."
