= 2009 Bangladesh ferry accident =

Maritime incident in Bangladesh

Coordinates: 25.898858°N 89.031658°E

- Map of Bangladesh
- Date: 4 December 2009
- Time: Morning
- Location: Daira river, Mithamain Upazila, Kishoreganj District, Bangladesh
- Cause: Collision
- Participants: 100 Passengers & Crew
- Deaths: 47

The 2009 Bangladesh ferry accident occurred on 4 December 2009 on the Daira river located in Mithamain Upazila, Kishoreganj District in Bangladesh. A passenger ferry collided head-on with a launch. At least 47 people were killed. The accident occurred in the morning when the river was covered by fog.

== Accident ==
At around 9.00am local time the ferry, which was overcrowded, was traveling on the Daira river about 100 km from the capital of Dhaka when it collided with a motor launch due to poor visibility caused by thick fog. The accident occurred only a week after another ferry disaster in Bangladesh killed at least 85 people.

== Rescue effort ==
The police chief of Kishorganj district, Anwar Hossain, commented that most of the casualties were women and children and that 46 bodies had been retrieved after the ferry had been fully searched with the aid of specialist divers from Dhaka. He said in a media statement that the rescue was called off Friday evening with eight people unaccounted for. The Prime Minister of Bangladesh, Sheikh Hasina, sent condolences to the families of those who had lost loved ones.

== Cause ==
Shah Kamal, the chief government official in Kishorganj district blamed the poor conditions caused by the early morning fog as well as citing driver error as the cause. Boat and ferry accidents due to lax safety standards and overloading are common in Bangladesh, which is criss-crossed by 230 rivers, More than 3,000 people are estimated to have lost their lives in ferry accidents since 1977.

Bangladesh is the world's most densely populated country, with more than 1,000 people per square kilometre (2,600 people/mi^{2}), and also one of the poorest.
