= MV Langeland =

History
- Name: 1978: Janneland; 1978: Langefoss; 1990: Langeland
- Owner: Myklebusthaug Management AS
- Builder: Eide Contracting AS, Høylandsbygda, Halsnøya, Norway
- Yard number: 91
- Launched: 19 June 1971
- Completed: 1 October 1971
- In service: 1971
- Out of service: 2009
- Identification: IMO number: 7113727
- Fate: Wrecked 31 July 2009

General characteristics
- Tonnage: 673 NT
- Length: 13.2 m
- Beam: 17.33 m
- Installed power: 1,288 kW
- Propulsion: 1 diesel engine
- Speed: 12.9 knots (23.9 km/h; 14.8 mph)
- Crew: 6

MV Langeland was a Norwegian cargo ship. It was owned and operated by the Norwegian company Myklebusthaug Management AS based in Fonnes in Austrheim Municipality. It sank on July 31, 2009 in stormy weather south of the Koster Islands; no one from its 6-men crew survived.
