= Tongan narrative =

Collation of Tongan myths, legends and other traditions

Tongan narrative, Tongan mythology, or ancient Tongan religion, sometimes referred to as tala-ē-fonua (meaning, "telling of the land and its people") in Tongan, is the collation of various myths, legends, stories, traditions, characters, creatures, spirits, and gods of the Polynesian islands that now make up the island nation of Tonga.

It is a variant of other Polynesian mythologies with multiple cultural and religious overlaps, however it is considered to be distinct from other Polynesian mythologies as it can be studied more specifically to understand the history and culture of Tonga, as well it can also be studied more broadly within the fields of history, anthropology, and mythology.

== Creation myth ==
In the beginning there was just the sea and the spirit world, Pulotu, and between them was a rock called Touiaʻo Futuna. On the rock lived Piki and his twin sister, Kele, ʻAtungaki and his twin sister, Maimoaʻo Longona, Fonua'uta and his twin sister, Fonuavai, and Hemoana and his twin sister, Lupe. Piki lay with his own sister; they had two children, a son, Taufulifonua, and a daughter, Havea Lolofonua; ʻAtungaki also lay with his sister, who bore him a daughter, Velelahi; and Fonuaʻuta lay with his sister. They had a daughter, Velesiʻi.

When Taufulifonua grew to manhood, his sister, Havea Lolofonua, bore him a son, Hikuleʻo, Tangaloa and Maui divided the creation between them. Hikuleʻo took as his portion, Pulotu, Tangaloa took the sky and Maui the underworld. Hemoana, whose form was the sea snake, and Lupe, whose form was a dove, then divided the remainder between them, Hemoana taking the sea and Lupe taking the land.

Tangaloa had several sons in the sky: Tangaloa Tamapoʻuli ʻAlamafoa, Tangaloa ʻEitumatupuʻa, Tangaloa ʻAtulongolongo and Tangaloa Tufunga. Old Tangaloa grew tired of looking down from the sky and seeing nothing but sea, so he sent down Tangaloa ʻAtulongolongo in the form of a plover to see if he could find land. All Tangaloa 'Atulongolongo could find was a reef below the water, where ʻAta is now. So old Tangaloa told Tangaloa Tufunga to throw down into the sea the chips from the wood carving on which he was working. Tangaloa Tufunga continued to do this for a long time, and on two occasion Tangaloa ʻAtulongolongo flew down in the form of a plover to see if anything had happened, but found nothing. On the third occasion, however, he found that the chips had formed an island. This was ʻEua. Later, Tangaloa Tufunga threw down more chips to form the islands of Kao and Tofua.

Tongatapu and most of the other islands were the work of Maui. One day Maui visited Manuka (Samoan: Manuʻa) and there an old man, Tonga Fusifonua, gave him a fish-hook. Maui went fishing with this hook, but when he tried to pull in his line he found it was caught. He exerted all his strength and succeeded in hauling the line in, to find that he had dragged up Tongatapu from the bottom of the sea. Maui continued fishing with this wonderful hook and so pulled up from the deeps the rest of the islands of Tonga, and some of those of Fiji and Samoa as well.

ʻAta began as a reef below the water and slowly rose out of the sea. One day Tangaloa ʻAtulonglongo visited ʻAta in the form of a plover and dropped a seed from the beak upon the island. The next time he visited 'Ata he found that the seed had grown into a creeper that covered the island. He pecked at the root of this creeper until it split in two. Then he returned to the sky. A few days later he returned to find that the root had rotted and a fat, juicy worm was curled up in it. He pecked the worm in two. From the top section a man was formed called Kohai. The bottom section also turned into a man called Koau. Then the plover felt a morsel left on his beak; he shook it off and it turned into a man called Momo. Kohai, Koau and Momo were the first men in Tonga. Maui brought them wives from Pulotu and they became the ancestors of the Tonga people.

== Other prominent entries on Tongan narrative ==
- ʻAhoʻeitu
- Aitu
- ʻEua
- Hikule'o
- Hiko
- 'Ilaheva
- Kae and Longopoa
- Kohai, Koau, mo Momo
- Laufakana'a
- Maui
- Niuatoputapu
- Sangone
- Seketo'a
- Tafahi
- Tamapo'uli'alamafoa
- Tangaloa
- Taufa
- Tu'itatui
- ʻAta
- Limu

== See also ==
- Culture of Tonga
- Polynesian narrative
