= Tongan Kava Ceremony-Taumafa Kava =

Kava ceremonies in Tongan society

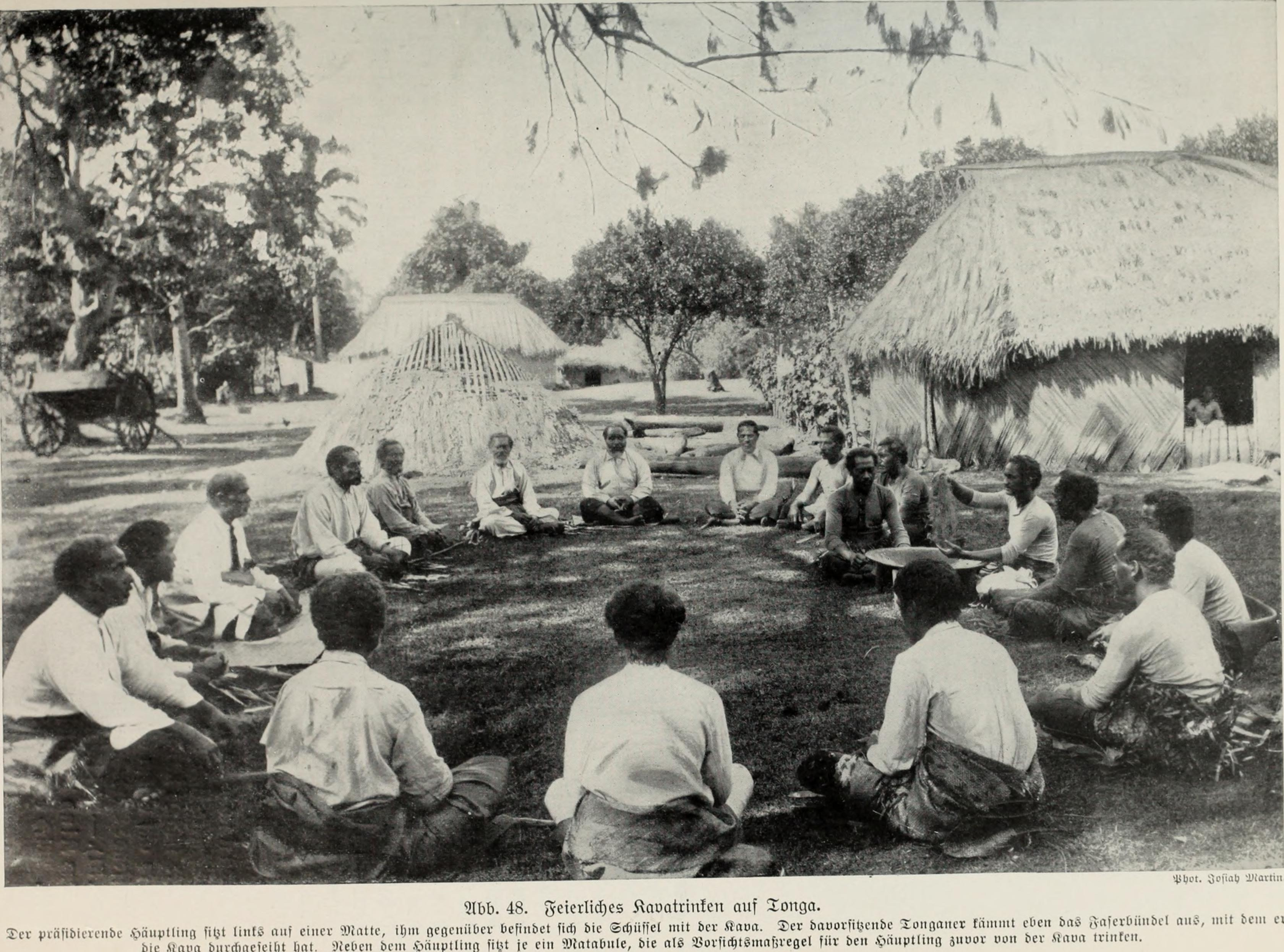
Kava ceremony photographed in 1914

Tongan kava ceremonies are a variety of ceremonies involving the kava plant that play an integral part of Tongan society and governance. They play a role in strengthening cultural values and principles, solidifying traditional ideals of duty and reciprocity, reaffirming societal structures, and entrenching the practice of pukepuke fonua (lit. "tightly holding onto the land"), a Tongan cultural ideal to maintain, preserve, and live traditional Tongan culture. Tongan kava ceremonies continue to permeate Tongan society both in Tonga and the diaspora. They range in formality from informal faikava or kava "parties" to the highly stratified, ancient, and ritualized Taumafa Kava, or Royal Kava Ceremony.

== Etymology ==
The name of the kava plant is said to derive from Kavaʻonau, the name of a girl who was sacrificed by her parents in Tongan mythology. From her grave, the kava and tō (sugarcane) plants miraculously sprouted.

Kava is used throughout Oceania, especially Polynesia. Names for the kava plant include Hawaiian: ʻawa, Samoan: ʻava, Fijian: yaqona or yagona, Pohnpeian: sakau, Kosraean: seka, and malok or malogu (parts of Vanuatu). The various words for kava in many Polynesian languages mean sour, bitter, or poisonous.

In Tongan society, there are registers of language used when referring to different levels of society. The highest register is used when speaking about the King and God; the next register is used when speaking about the nobility, such as the King's household and chiefs of the realm; and the lowest register is used when speaking about commoners, or tuʻa. The term used for a kava ceremony conveys information about the social makeup of the ceremony or the environment in which kava is being used. Any kava ceremony where the King of Tonga is present is called Taumafa Kava (lit. "to eat kava"). In the common register, the kava ceremony is called kai kava or faikava ("to do kava"); this often takes place in Tongan kava social clubs, and nearly anyone in the Tongan social strata can take part.

== Origin of kava ==
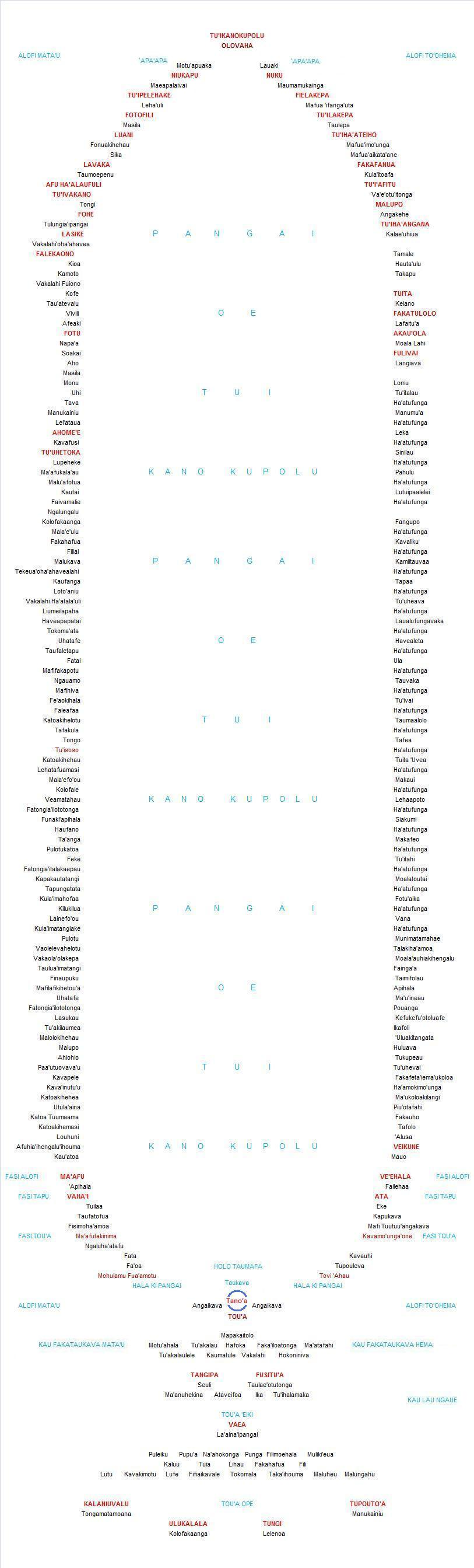
Diagram showing the seating arrangements of chiefs, nobles and their matāpules in the kava circle

Tongan beliefs regarding the origins of kava are dominated by the tala tupuʻa (traditional oral account) as told by the late Queen Sālote Tupou III and as found in the historical records of venerated Tongan historian Masiu Moala, as well as the student informational book compiled by the Siasi Uesiliana Tauʻatāina ʻo Tonga (Free Wesleyan Church of Tonga). The most popularly accepted account of kava's origins tells of a poor couple, Fevanga (father) and Fefafa (mother), and their leprous daughter, Kava’onau, who is sacrificed to the then Tuʻi Tonga; from her grave sprouts the kava and tō (sugarcane). However, there are other accounts of kava's usage by Tongans and deified ancestors that predate the Kavaʻonau story.

=== Kava in Pulotu ===
One of the many stories of kava's use is found in the account given to Fison by the then Tui Lau, Enele Maʻafu, son of former Tuʻi Kanokupolu Aleamotuʻa. Maʻafu was a self-made Fijian chief living in the Lau Islands in south-western Fiji. In this story, Maʻafu relates the frequent use of kava by the great gods in Pulotu. He recounts to Fison how Hikuleʻo, Māui, and Tangaloa, three of the great ancestor gods of the Tongan pantheon, indulged in kava for relaxation purposes, for competition, and in the case of one of the Māuis, as a peace offering to his father, Māui-Motuʻa. However, this account does not detail kava's use in a ceremonial fashion such as in the Taumafa Kava or other instances of installing chiefs. Other accounts of kava usage in Pulotu can be found in the work done by Gifford on Tongan society.

=== ʻAhoʻeitu: First Tuʻi Tonga ===
Kava also plays a very important role in the origin story of the Tuʻi Tonga Empire line of kings, Tonga's first and most sacred line that is said to have controlled a vast Oceanic empire. The Tuʻi Tonga line is the progenitor of most Tongan chiefly and noble titles, and even the current ruling House of Tupou can trace their lineage to this senior line.

In short, a half-human (by his mother 'Ilaheva) and half-god man named ʻAhoʻeitu ascended a great toa tree in search of his father, one of the great sky-gods, Tangaloa ʻEitumātupuʻa. In his search, he happened upon Tangaloa, and it is said that he partook of kava with Tangaloa. During his stay in langi, the abode of Tangaloa—which many researchers claim is the sky or even Manuʻa, Samoa—ʻAhoʻeitu met and bested his five older brothers in an array of sports. ʻAhoʻeitu immediately became the favourite amongst his siblings; out of jealousy, his older brothers led by the eldest, Talafale, killed ʻAhoʻeitu, throwing his head into a hoi bush and disposing of the body by eating it.

After searching for ʻAhoʻeitu, Tangaloa ʻEitumātupuʻa inquired of his five sons. He knew what they had done and commanded that a great tānoʻa or kumete (kava bowl) be brought to him, in which he commanded the five to throw up the remains of ʻAhoʻeitu. After they had done so, Tangaloa ʻEitumātupuʻa covered the kava bowl with leaves of the nonu (noni) tree, and ʻAhoʻeitu was miraculously brought back to life. It was proclaimed by Tangaloa ʻEitumātupuʻa that ʻAhoʻeitu would return to maama (the world and Tonga) to become the Tuʻi Tonga, paramount chief and king of Tonga, and his five older brothers would go with him to serve their younger brother and protect him. The eldest of the five, Talafale, became Tuʻi Faleua ("King of the Second House"); if ever ʻAhoʻeitu's line should die out, Talafale and his descendants would then rule. Today the Tuʻipelehake title is the line descended from Talafale. The other four brothers became the heads of the kau Falefā (the Four Houses), tasked with specific duties in protecting and providing for ʻAhoʻeitu and the Tuʻi Tonga line.

Many scholars, traditional Tongan chiefs, and kakai ʻilo (those with special knowledge) disagree on many of the details relating to the rise of ʻAhoʻeitu. However, most agree upon the use of kava in the installation of ʻAhoʻeitu as the Tuʻi Tonga. Viliami Tolutaʻu, a professor of sculpture at Brigham Young University–Hawaii and artist of the ʻAhoʻeitu statue that fronts the new St. George government building in Tonga, was adamant in an interview on the Radio-Tonga-Hawaiʻi Vākē-Tali-Folau programme that to truly understand Tongan tala tupuʻa, there needs to be an understanding of Tongan heliaki (metaphorical language), similar to Hawaiian kaona. The kava bowl commanded by Tangaloa is the beginning of the ceremony at which the five elder siblings, bested by ʻAhoʻeitu and favoured by Tangaloa, will be installed as the servants of the ruler of Tonga, the Tuʻi Tonga. Traditionally kava was chewed (mama) before it was mixed and strained into the drink. In the tale of ʻAhoʻeitu, there is heliaki about the elder siblings "eating" their brother and throwing up his body into the tānoʻa (kava bowl). This is heliaki speech for their obeisance to the new paramount chief, whom they recognize as being higher, as they must descend below in status to chew his kava and eventually descend from their father's abode to serve their younger brother.

=== Kavaʻonau ===
The most popular story about kava's origins is that of Fevanga and Fefafa and their daughter Kavaʻonau. In short, an elderly couple lived on the island of ‘Eueiki during a time of great famine with their daughter Kavaʻonau. Tradition states she was stricken with leprosy. One day a great chief—many scholars cite it was the 10th Tuʻi Tonga, Momo—and his entourage, after spending time at sea fishing and competing with each other, decided to rest on ‘Eueiki. Somehow the old couple heard of the coming of the King and immediately took to preparing the proper food presentations. However, as it was a time of famine, the couple had only one kape plant (giant taro); as Fefafa went to get the kape to be cooked in the ʻumu (earth oven), she found the King resting under its shade. Sorrowful that there was no other worthy meal on the island, the old couple, out of duty and love for their King, decided to sacrifice their daughter as tribute.

The warriors and people that had come with the King found out what was transpiring and immediately told the King, who, out of sadness and regret, ordered the party to depart the island, leaving the girl in her ʻumu grave. After some time, the old couple found two plants had grown from their daughter's grave: at the head the kava plant and at the feet the tō (sugarcane). As the plants grew, the couple noticed a mouse chewing at the kava became inebriated, whereas when it ate of the tō it became energized and scurried away. One day the great tufunga fonua (carpenter of the land), the chief Lōʻau, visited the island, and the couple told him of the plants. Lōʻau told them to immediately take the plants to the compound of the Tuʻi Tonga, where it is said that Lōʻau then presented these plants, told him of their properties, and instituted the kava ceremony. The ceremony was to memorialize the sacrifice of the child and the parents for their King and his hosts, whereas the King's partaking of the kava would be acceptance of his duties to care for and lead his people.

Some accounts vary as to the details, but this story is cited and known by most Tongans and is the foundation by which many cite the importance of the kava plant and its function in ceremony. Scholars such as renowned Tongan scholar Futa Helu state: "I tend to believe that the kava was originally employed as part of the ancient religion. Then it was socialized to keep order in society, but the myth of the kava seems to point to healing religious practices. It seems to me that human sacrifice was fairly common in ancient times. Perhaps in Tonga or in other parts of Polynesia, and the kava was developed to crowd it out. Yes, it has become the great metaphor of our society, the kava." Mele Ongaʻalupe Taumoepeau, a respected educator and Tongan scholar, says that the kava represents "sacrifice, respect, loyalty to the land, keeping up relations, unity, and giving of one's life." Faivaola Dr Eric B. Shumway, a noted scholar on Tongan culture and history and traditional matāpule (talking chief) of the chief Nuku, produced a film called Kava Kuo Heka in which the importance, history, and usage of the Royal Kava Ceremony is detailed.

=== Scientific origins of kava ===
Kava scholar and Fijian anthropologist S. Apo Aporosa writes: "Archaeologists, linguists and botanists believe kava originated in northern Vanuatu approximately 3000 years ago". It is thought that the spread of kava followed early migrational trade routes as far west as Papua New Guinea, to Hawaii in the east, and New Zealand in the south, where it failed to grow. As Lebot and Levesque (1989) explain: "for kava, dispersal of vegetative propagules by wind or bird is impossible, [and] the plant therefore owes its survival entirely to human distribution of stem cuttings" (234). Together with kava's use in indigenous medicine, the plant in both its raw and drinkable form plays significant roles in traditional practice, being widely used to mark life events from birth to death. In a number of the island nations such as Pohnpei (Micronesia), Vanuatu, Fiji, Tonga, and Samoa, much of that traditional use remains, whereas in other areas such as Te Au Maohi (the greater Rarotongan island group), French Polynesia, and Hawaii, colonial contact and missionization saw kava use reduced and in some cases eliminated altogether.

== Taumafa Kava: Tongan Royal Kava Ceremony ==
The Taumafa Kava is held when the King of Tonga is installed with the title Tuʻi Kanokupolu and made the hau, or reigning sovereign and champion of all of Tonga. This ceremony, however, may take place for funerary rites of the King or members of the royal household. At the Taumafa Kava, another ceremony often takes place simultaneously: the pongipongi hingoa, where a noble title is installed upon a former noble's heir. At the pongipongi hingoa, the traditional food gifts found in the Taumafa Kava are often provided by that soon-to-be noble and his kāinga (distant relatives) and haʻa (clan). If the King is not presiding at the kava ceremony, then it is not a Taumafa Kava. A noble kava ceremony of the nobility and chiefs is referred to as ʻilo kava, whereas kava ceremonies by the commoner class are often referred to simply as kava or ouau kava (kava ceremony).

=== Arrangement ===
The correct arrangement of the Taumafa Kava is of utmost importance as the traditional seating of the Taumafa Kava follows strict protocols that also follow historical events that determine seating arrangements. The kava protocol and arrangement of chiefs, food, and the execution of the ceremony is accomplished by the King's clan, the Haʻa Ngata. Members of the Ngata clan surround the King's ʻalofi (kava ring), carrying clubs and spears to protect the sacredness of the ceremony and to "remind" the chiefs of their need to follow protocol. The kava ceremony is said to also be arranged according to the layout of the great kalia (double-hulled sailing vessel) of Tonga's past. Tevita Fale, a traditional knowledge holder from the ancient capital of Tonga in Lapaha, also states that the kava circle is the universe; the King anciently was thought to be the sun, the rope extended from him from the tānoʻa was the equator, and both sides of the circle represented the opposing hemispheres.

=== Procedure and preparation ===
Some have argued that it is not sufficient to provide the entirety of the ceremony with all ceremonial words and orders given by the King's talking chief. Attempts at detailing the kava ceremony have been made before, notably by Gifford; however, although a great addition to the academy, many have said the mistakes in language, meaning, and ritual that he summarizes do not accurately depict the ceremony. The entirety of the ceremony is outlined in Tongan for students in the Kingdom of Tonga, but the meanings of angi (ritualized orders) are ancient and carry cultural nuances and socio-cultural meanings generally unfamiliar to foreigners. The film Kava Kuo Heka has been cited as a proper depiction of the importance of the kava ceremony to Tongans, partially due to video recording as narrated and explained by Faivaola.

The King's Taumafa Kava is arranged according to traditional Tongan ideology of social structure. Emphasis is placed on the senior lines of chiefs and kings stretching all the way back to the first Tuʻi Tonga, ʻAhoʻeitu. At the head of the circle is the ʻolovaha, where the King or highest-ranking chief in the ʻalofi (ring) sits. Flanking the ʻolovaha are the two ʻapaʻapa, the two most senior matāpule (talking chiefs and heralds of the King). Following them are other chiefs more closely affiliated to the ancient Tuʻi Tonga line or chiefs with close affiliation to the current ruling paramount title, the Tuʻi Kanokupolu. Also amongst the chiefs are traditional navigators, the royal undertakers, the King's carpenters, and traditional titles associated with warriors. Along the rims of the circle, the King's nobles and their matāpule are seated according to clan, occupation, and former loyalty afforded the ʻolovaha. At specific points of the circle are chiefs and nobles with specific duties in the circle; they demarcate a special relationship to the King. No two nobles of the Kingdom may sit next to each other; they must be separated by a matāpule or lower-ranking chief.

At the other end of the circle is the tānoʻa (the royal kava bowl) and the taukava (kava mixer). Most recently, however, at the installation ceremonies of the late George Tupou V and the current king, Tupou VI, three bowls have been used and drank from to symbolize the acceptance of the three major dynastic lines of kings of the ruling monarch. Behind the taukava is the touʻa, where the commoners sit, as well as those participating in the ceremony as counters of the food gifts and kava, kava cup servers, and matrilineal relatives of the chiefs in the circle. Incorporated in the touʻa are also very high-ranking chiefs who, for varying reasons, sit in the touʻa, and their positions are called the touʻa ʻeiki. The chief Maʻu Kilikili, one of the King's heralds, explains that the kava ceremony is composed of two circles, one with the chiefs, and the other with the commoners. It is the coming together of these two groups of people to drink from the kava as prepared by the people, to signify the role of chiefs in accepting their responsibility as good stewards of their people, whereas the people are expected to serve their chiefs. The arrangement of the kava circle is the physical manifestation of the fonua—the land and people—in communion with their King, where all members of society are represented by one or more of the chiefs.

==== Procedure ====
After all the chiefs have been arranged by the Haʻa Ngata, the King's right-hand talking chief, Motuʻapuaka, begins with ritualized expressions of gratitude for the kava and food gifts found in the centre of the ʻalofi, to which members of the ʻalofi are to repeat along with him. Once this is done, and all is set, the King will then enter the circle, traditionally brought in by a Fijian-derived chiefly title to ward off dangers and evil spirits, the Tui Soso—as no Tongan may walk in front of the King—and will be seated at the head of the circle, the ʻolovaha. Motuʻapuaka and the King's left-hand talking chief and chief undertaker, Lauaki, will continue with the ritualized expressions of gratitude again. Motuʻapuaka will then order that the kava and food be set in order, should there be anything out of place.

Next, Motuʻapuaka will order the food be ceremonially lifted up to show there are no weapons hidden. The following ritual then is to count each of the hundreds if not thousands of baskets of food, 400 lb pigs, and varying sizes of kava plants, after which a report of the entirety of the spread will be done by one of the counters. Motuʻapuaka will order the kava bowl and the touʻa prepare to receive the kava. Motuʻapuaka orders a kava plant sufficient for the occasion be broken down and divided and given to the kava mixer, who will pound and arrange the kava in the bowls. Motuʻapuaka will order two helpers to pour water in the bowls and the mixer will begin the ritualized mixing process known as the milolua. Once the fau strainer (wild hibiscus) is put in the bowl ready to strain, the traditional orations begin. Depending on the occasion, a minimum of two speakers from amongst the chiefs will give grand stylized orations concerning the occasion.

After the orations, a food offering is prepared and divided out amongst the members of the ʻalofi, at which time the matrilineal relatives of the circles of chiefs will enter the circle and claim the food as their own. The King's portion must always be accepted on behalf of the King by a foreigner, as no Tongan ranks high enough to do this honour. When the kava is ready, it shall be called out by one of the helpers of the kava mixers, at which the first cup is told to be brought to the King. Following the King, the order of the cups brought generally goes along the ʻalofi; however, because of the touʻa ʻeiki (the high chiefs seated in the touʻa), cups to them may be brought as well not following the circular order. When the kava cup reaches a would-be noble, all kava serving halts so as to allow Motuʻapuaka to officially install that chief with their title and give him the charge and commitment from the King and the people. When the kava is drunk, the person is now a fully installed noble of the Kingdom of Tonga. Once all of the circle has been served as well as the mixer, a chief of the Ngata clan will alert Motuʻapuaka that the kava is done, and Motuʻapuaka will thank the Ngata clan for their service and order the kava bowl to be "lifted". The King will then leave the circle and the ceremony is officially adjourned.

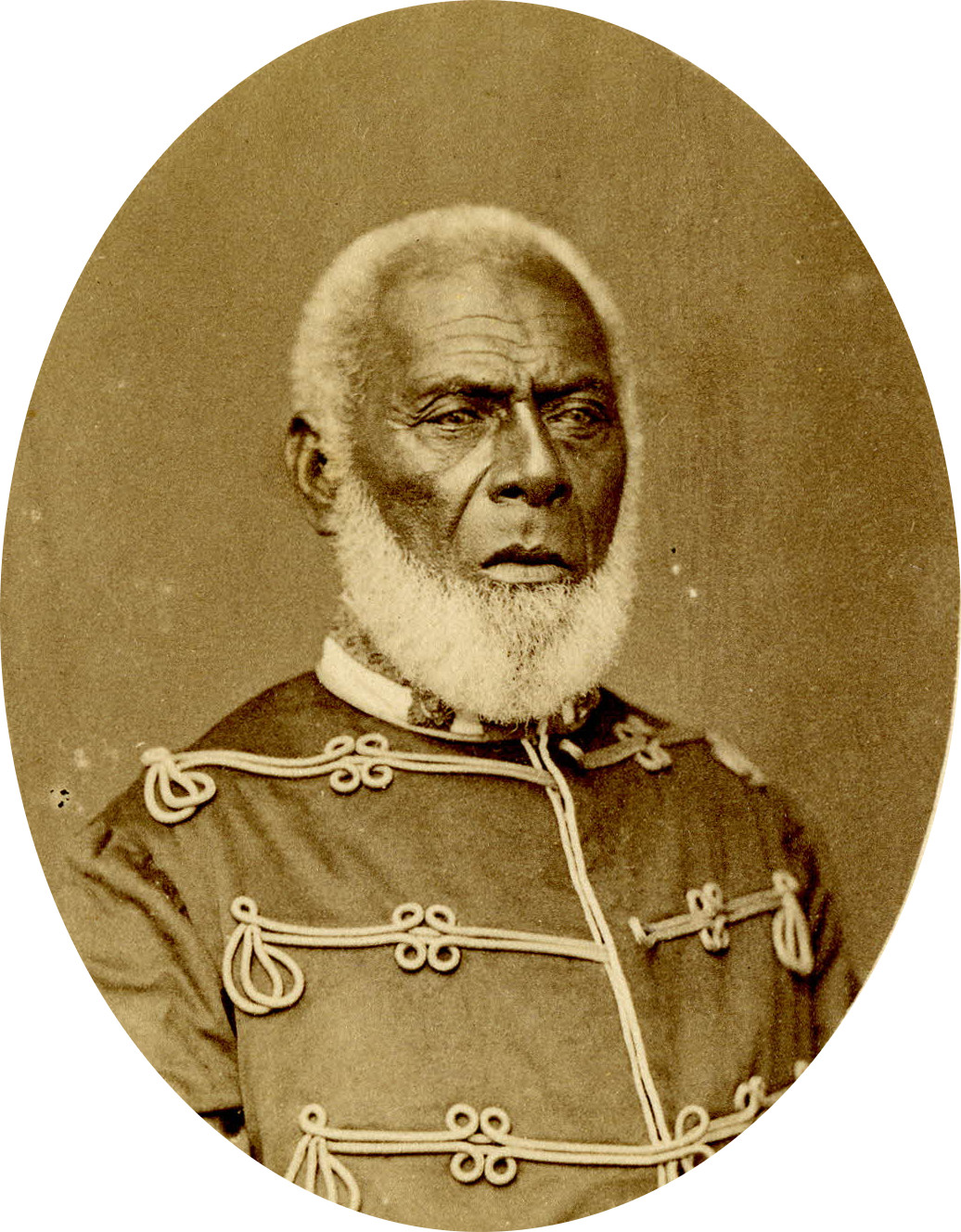
King Siaosi (George) Tupou I

== Contemporary and political use ==
The Taumafa Kava ceremony, in its current form, takes its form from the Tuʻi Tonga's kava ceremony, formerly known as the fulitaunga, which is the ceremony established by Lōʻau. There are differences, however, between the fulitaunga and the Taumafa Kava as used by the Tuʻi Kanokupolu. The differences reflect the status of the Tuʻi Kanokupolu in relation to the Tuʻi Tonga. The Tuʻi Tonga once sat with back facing the east during the kava ceremony as he was seen to be the "sun" of the world. The Tuʻi Kanokupolu, however, sits with back facing west, as the traditional seat of power of the Tuʻi Kanokupolu was in the western Hihifo district of Tonga, in the village of Kanokupolu. Aesthetic changes have occurred as well, such as the kava cup of today made out of coconut shell was once a plantain leaf folded to hold the kava. Also, the tānoʻa's hanger once faced the Tuʻi Tonga and divided the ʻalofi into two "hemispheres". These hemispheres were separated by a rope extending from the bowl to the Tuʻi Tonga along with two other kafa (sennit ropes) extending to the two matāpule, whereas today the hanger faces the kava mixer.

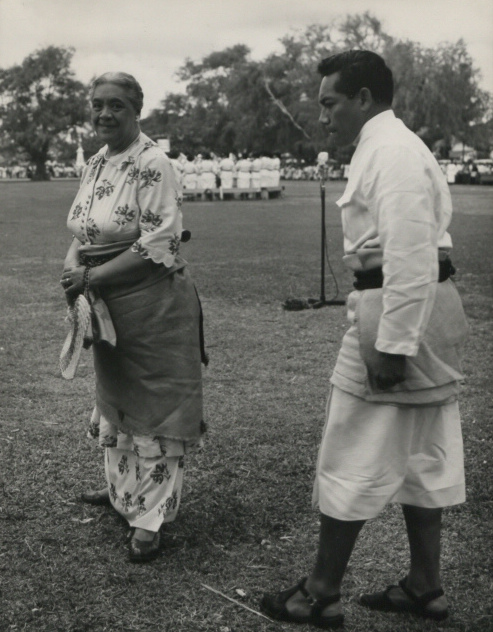
Queen Sālote and attendant

The Royal Tongan kava ceremony is still politically significant as it is the ritualized installation of the monarch of Tonga along with the chiefly nobility. The King and nobles are the traditional landholders and may hold government positions within the Tongan constitutional monarchy as afforded them according to chiefly right. Since the days of Tonga's great unifier, George Tupou I, the monarchs of Tonga have used the kava ceremony to continue to establish their political power and influence in the kingdom, arranging and rearranging traditional seating as well as holding grand kava ceremonies in which chiefs will pledge their loyalty. During the investiture of Queen Sālote Tupou III at her Taumafa Kava, many of the high-ranking chiefs were not present as a form of political rebellion; however, years later, after much political maneuvering by the Queen to attain loyalty from the great chiefs, a grand kava ceremony was held at which all chiefs from all the islands of the Tongan archipelago were expected to attend to show their allegiance and loyalty to Queen and country. Strategic and contemporary Taumafa Kava performance since the days of George Tupou I and his great-great-granddaughter, Sālote Tupou III, is in effect acts of defiance against the colonial forms of leadership acquisition and election. The choice to continually use the Taumafa Kava as the preferred form of installing the monarch and chiefs is a form of indigenous agency and sovereignty performed by the native people themselves in spite of the many Palangi (European) modes of governance as enacted in government.
