= Fusituʻa =

Fusituʻa is a surname. Notable people with the surname include:

- David Fusitu'a (born 1994), New Zealand rugby league player
- 'Eseta Fusitu'a, Tongan teacher
- Siaosi ʻAlokuoʻulu Wycliffe Fusituʻa (1927–2014), Tongan politician

== See also ==
- Lord Fusituʻa, Tongan noble title
