= Laufakanaʻa =

Tongan god

In the Polynesian mythology of Tonga, Laufakanaʻa (speak to silence; i.e.: command [the winds] to calm down) was a primordial creator god, and his home was ʻAta.

In Tongan cosmogony, the sky and the sea, and the land of Pulotu (the dark underworld, the home of the souls of departed chiefs) existed from the earliest times. All other lands were created later. Either they were thrown down from the sky by Havea Hikuleʻo or, subsequently, they were fished up by Maui from the bottom of the ocean. All the makafonua (landstones) of Hikuleʻo were full of unevenness, and tended to jump around (that is, they were the source of earthquakes) and were full of holes and pits (that is, volcanoes), while Maui's lands were smooth (coral islands and atolls). ʻAta and ʻEua, the islands which were fished up first, were quite hilly, as Maui apparently was not an expert fisherman yet. His next catch, (Tongatapu) he kept much smoother.

The first people of ʻAta came forth directly from the same uanga (fly larva, maggot) as Kohai, Koau, mo Momo, and were the ancestors of all other men. At that time the god Tamapoʻuliʻalamafoa was the king of the sky, and he commanded some of the Tangaloa gods to tell the faʻahikehe (sub-god) Laufakanaʻa to go down to the realm of light (i.e. the earth, not Pulotu) to become ruler of ʻAta and also ruler of the winds. Whenever a boat came to ʻAta in stormy weather, Laufakanaʻa had to listen to the prayers of the crew and give them a good wind to sail on. The prayer had to consist of an offering of mā (meal of fermented breadfruit) cooked in the oil of the grated coconut.

Laufakanaʻa also brought a special fishing net with him. This typical ʻAta-net was used by the islanders on special occasions, as when they went fishing for the Tuʻi Tonga. As well, the putalinga (a kind of plantain), the sī (ti (plant)), the ngū-ʻata and tua-ʻata yams were brought down from the sky by Laufakanaʻa and first grew on ʻAta, before they spread to the other islands.
