= ʻAlokuoʻulu =

ʻAlokuoʻulu is a surname. Notable people with the surname include:

- Tevita ʻAlokuoʻulu (1908–1973), Tongan noble
- Siaosi ʻAlokuoʻulu Wycliffe Fusituʻa (1927–2014), Tongan politician
