= 2014 Niuas Noble by-election =

Niuas Noble by-election
← 2010	22 May 2014
Candidate	Lord Fusituʻa
Party	independent
Popular vote	2
Percentage	100%

A by-election was held for the Niuas Noble seat to the Legislative Assembly of Tonga on 22 May 2014. It was triggered by the death of the constituency's incumbent representative, Lord Fusituʻa, on 24 April 2014.

== Candidates and voters ==
The Legislative Assembly sits seventeen People's Representatives, elected by the citizens, and nine Nobles' Representatives, elected by the nobility. The Niuas are the smallest of the four constituencies of the nobility, and the only one to elect only one representative. It covers the islands of Niuafoʻou and Niuatoputapu, and thus the lands allocated to three of the Kingdom's thirty-three titles of hereditary nobility. The holders of these three titles constitute the constituency's electorate, and its pool of candidates. Thus, the four nobles in the Niuas (Lord Fusituʻa, Lord Fotofili, Lord Maʻatu and Lord Tangipa) elect their representative among themselves. (In parallel, the Niuas also form a constituency for the people's vote. The Niuas send one noble and one people's representative to Parliament, in separate votes. The May 2014 by-election concerned only the nobility.)

Nobles do not officially stand as candidates, and none belong to any political party. Following the death of the incumbent Lord Fusituʻa, his son Mataʻiʻulua ‘i Fonuamotu inherited his title on May 6, and was thus able to participate in the by-election. The title of Maʻatu being vacant, there were only three nobles attached to the constituency.

In the November 2010 general election, the then-Lord Fusituʻa had been elected with a single vote cast:

Tongan general election, 2010: Niuas Nobles
Party	Candidate	Votes	%	±%
Independent	Lord Fusituʻa	1	100%	n/a
Majority		1	100%	n/a
Lord Fusituʻa gain from Lord Tangipa		Swing	n/a	

== Result ==
Two votes were cast, both for the new Lord Fusituʻa, who thereby replaced his late father in Parliament.

Niuas Noble by-election, 2014
Party	Candidate	Votes	%	±%
Independent	Lord Fusituʻa	2	100%	0
Turnout		2	66.7%	
Majority		2	100%	
Lord Fusituʻa gain from Lord Fusituʻa (his late father)		Swing	n/a	
