= Lord Fusituʻa =

Lord Fusituʻa is one of the 34 noble titles in Tonga. It may refer to:

- Tevita ʻAlokuoʻulu, Lord Fusituʻa 1929–1973
- Siaosi ‘Alokuo’ulu Wycliffe Fusitu’a, Lord Fusituʻa 1973–2014
- Mataʻiʻulua ʻi Fonuamotu, Lord Fusituʻa since 2014
