= ʻEseta Fusituʻa =

Tongan teacher, civil servant and government minister

Minister for Information and Communication
- In office April 2009 – 22 December 2010
- Prime Minister: Feleti Sevele
- Preceded by: Afuʻalo Matoto
- Succeeded by: Sialeʻataongo Tuʻivakanō

Personal details
- Born: ʻEseta Fuafolau Vakapuna ʻa Ngu Fulivai Tonga
- Children: One son and one daughter
- Education: Auckland University

ʻEseta Fuafolau Vakapunaʻa Ngu Fusituʻa, styled Dowager Lady Fusituʻa, is a Tongan former teacher, government official and Cabinet Minister. She was the first Tongan woman to obtain a bachelor's degree.

== Early life and education ==
ʻEseta Fusituʻa obtained an undergraduate degree from Auckland University in New Zealand in 1964. A year later she obtained a New Zealand teaching diploma. In 1967 she married Siaosi ʻAlokuoʻulu Wycliffe Fusituʻa, a large landowner on Niuafoʻou island who would be made Lord Fusituʻa in 1981 and represented the Niuas Nobles' constituency in the Legislative Assembly of Tonga. They had two children. Her husband died in 2014 at the age of 87, from which time she became known as the Dowager Lady Fusituʻa.

Fusituʻa was an assistant teacher at Tonga High School from 1965 to 1967, before becoming a member of staff of St Edmund's College in Canberra as a history teacher in 1973. She stayed there until 1981, in 1976 obtaining a master's degree in history from the Australian National University in Canberra, with a dissertation entitled King George Tupou II and the government of Tonga.

== Civil service ==
Returning to Tonga, Fusituʻa served in 1982 as deputy secretary to King Tāufaʻāhau Tupou IV, before being appointed as senior education officer in the Ministry of Education from 1983 to 1990. In 1990, she was appointed as deputy secretary in the Prime Minister's Office and promoted to Deputy Chief Secretary to the Cabinet in 1992. In 2001 she was appointed Chief Secretary to the Cabinet, a position she held until her retirement from the civil service in 2008.

== Political career ==
In 2009, Fusituʻa served as Deputy Chair of the Constitutional and Electoral Commission. In April 2009, Prime Minister Feleti Sevele announced her appointment as Minister for Information and Communication. Under the Tongan government structure, this meant that she also became a member of the 2008 Legislative Assembly. Her term came to an end at the conclusion of the parliamentary term in November 2010.

== Controversy ==
- In July 2010, while serving as minister, it was announced that Fusituʻa intended to clamp down on the printed media. This was widely seen as an infringement of press freedom and an attempt to manipulate the flow of information in favour of the government.
- In 2015, the government requested that she resign as chair of the Tonga Broadcasting Commission (TBC) because it intended to restructure the country's public enterprises in order to group the 15 enterprises under a smaller number of boards. The intention was that the TBC would be merged with the Tonga Communications Corporation, Tonga Post and Fast Print, which would all share a single board. Fusituʻa and one other board member, Lady Tunakaimanu Fielakepa, refused to resign, despite a settlement offer from the government, disrupting reform plans and starting a protracted legal battle.

== Honours ==
National honours

- Order of Queen Sālote Tupou III, Grand Cross (31 July 2008)
