= France–Tonga Maritime Delimitation Convention =

1980 treaty between France and Tonga

Convention between the Government of the French Republic and the Government of the Kingdom of Tonga on the delimitation of economic zones
- Type: Boundary delimitation
- Signed: 11 January 1980
- Location: Nuku'alofa, Tonga
- Effective: 11 January 1980
- Parties: France; Tonga
- Depositary: United Nations Secretariat
- Languages: French; Tongan

The France–Tonga Maritime Delimitation Convention is a 1980 treaty in which France and Tonga agreed to a maritime border between Tonga and the French territory of Wallis and Futuna.

The convention was signed in Nuku'alofa on 11 January 1980. The text of the treaty is brief and states that the boundary will be an equidistant line between the Tongan and the French islands and that as soon as possible the parties will draw up cartographic maps that illustrate the border. When the border was actually drawn, Tongan sovereignty over Niuafo'ou was considered in drawing the equidistant line even though Niuafo'ou is hundreds of kilometres north of the rest of the islands of Tonga. As a result, the boundary is much closer to the islands of Wallis and Futuna than it is to the main islands of Tonga.

The treaty came into force on the day of signature. The full name of the treaty is Convention between the Government of the French Republic and the Government of the Kingdom of Tonga on the delimitation of economic zones.
