= ʻAva ceremony =

Custom of the Samoa Islands

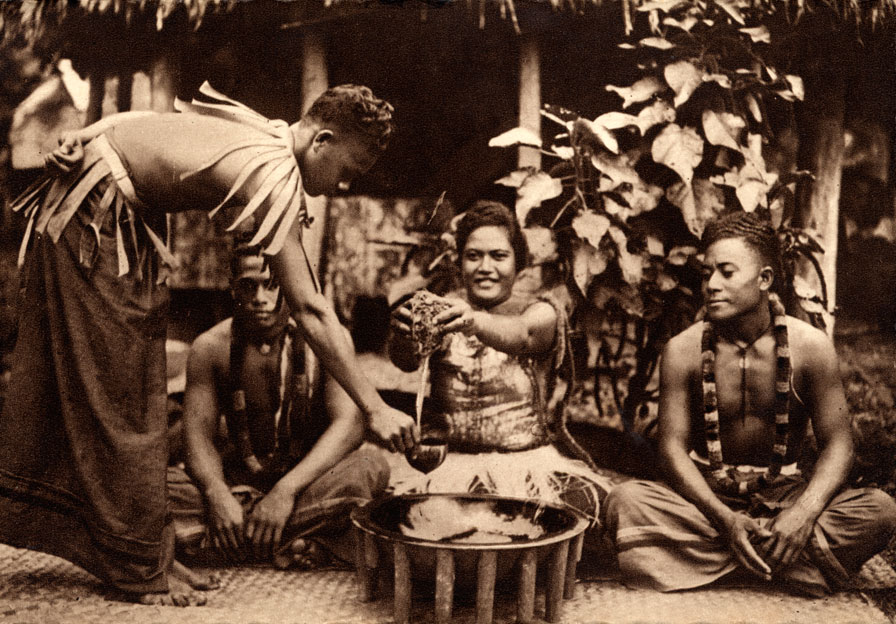
The ʻaumaga, ʻava makers must follow etiquette and cultural protocol in the making and serving of the ʻava. It is usually an honour to be selected for the ceremony. The ʻaumaga, with prescribed roles in the ceremony, were a select guild in the past.

The ʻava ceremony is one of the most important customs of the Samoa Islands and Tonga to an extent. It is a solemn ritual in which a ceremonial beverage is shared to mark important occasions in Samoan society. The Samoan word ʻava (pronounced with the glottal stop) is a cognate of the Polynesian word kava associated with the kava cultures in Oceania. Both terms are understood in Samoa.

The ʻava ceremony within Samoan culture retains the same ritual pattern with slight variations depending on the parties involved and the occasion. It always includes speeches and oratory and the formal drinking of ʻava, including women if they are part of the ceremony, with special attention paid to precedence in drinking order. One of the most important occasions for the ʻAva ceremony is during the bestowal of matai chiefly titles.

== Etymology - ʻava ==
The Samoan word for both the plant and the drink manufactured therefrom is ʻava (pronounced with the glottal stop), although at some distant date before the letter k was dropped from the Samoan language it was termed kava by which name it is universally recognised. The drop of the letter k is often replaced by the glottal stop in Samoan.

According to Lynch (2002), the reconstructed Proto-Polynesian term for the plant, *kawa, was derived from the Proto-Oceanic term *kawaʀ in the sense of a "bitter root" or "potent root [used as fish poison]". It may have been related to reconstructed *wakaʀ (in Proto-Oceanic and Proto-Malayo-Polynesian) via metathesis. It originally referred to Zingiber zerumbet, which was used to make a similar mildly psychoactive bitter drink in Austronesian rituals. Cognates for *kawa include Pohnpeian sa-kau; Tongan, Niue, Rapa Nui, Tuamotuan, and Rarotongan kava; and Hawaiian ʻawa. In some languages, most notably Māori kawa, the cognates have come to mean "bitter", "sour", or "acrid" to the taste.

== ʻAva titles ==
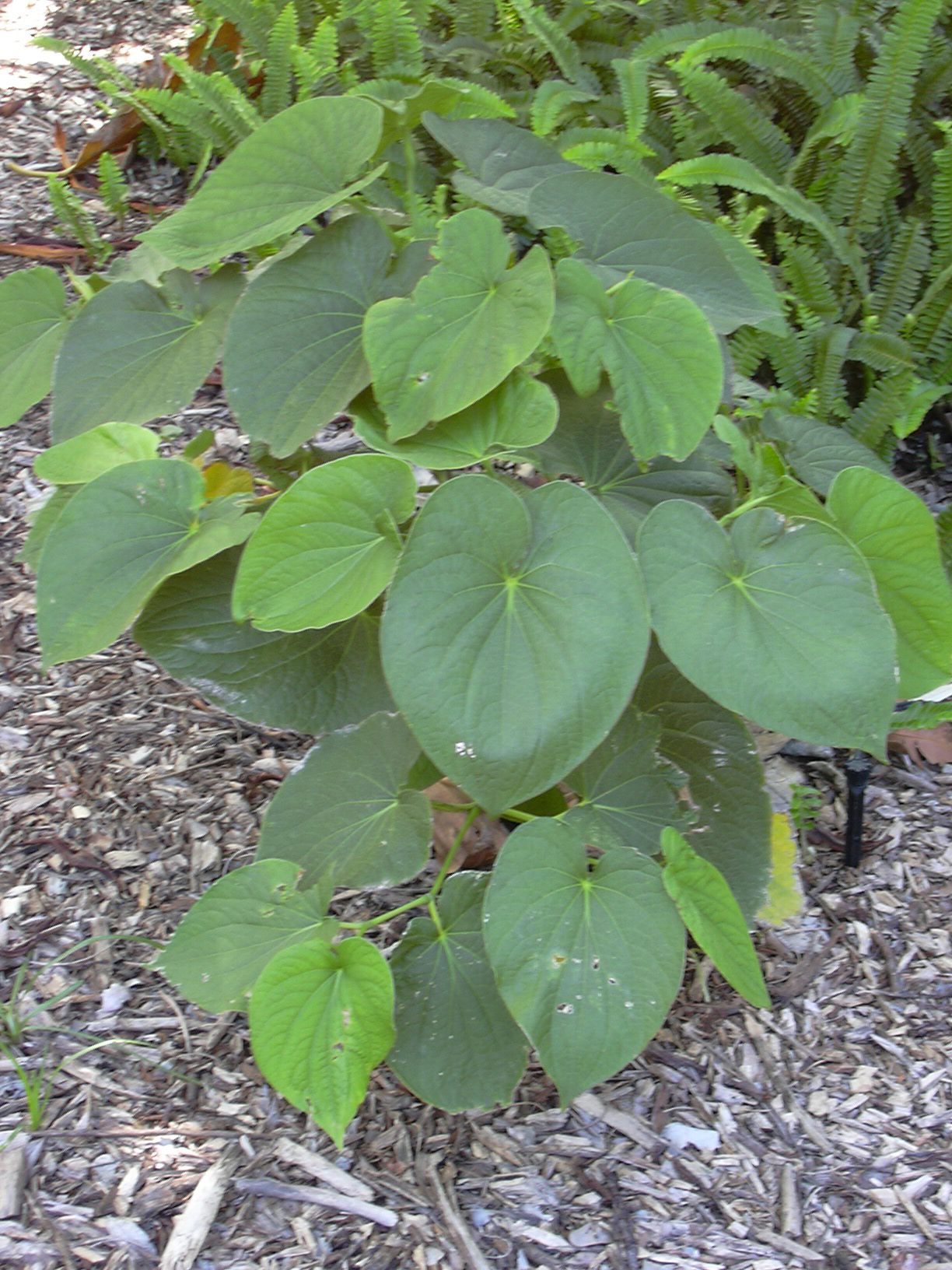
A young plant Piper methysticum

The ʻAva Title is a name or names bestowed only on certain matai chiefs who also have an ʻAva Title inseparable from their chiefly title. The bestowal of an ʻAva title usually takes place at the same time a matai title is bestowed. It occasionally happens that the ʻAva title is bestowed first, but only after it has been determined that the chiefly title will follow and after it has been publicly announced that such an event will take place in the near future. In either event the procedure is the same.

== ʻAva beverage ==
The ʻava beverage is made from the dried roots of the plant Piper methysticum and mixed with water before it is strained for drinking. The plants grow to a maximum height of about seven feet, the majority of specimens being much less. It usually has several stems springing direct from the roots. The roots from which the drink is made are carefully cleaned and scraped. When fully grown, the roots vary considerably in size, and, with a section of the stem of the plant attached, resemble roughly, a club. The root of the plant is called aʻa ʻava, the first word meaning root. The ʻava roots are cleaned and dried in the sun before usage.

== Ritual items ==
=== Bowl - tanoa ===
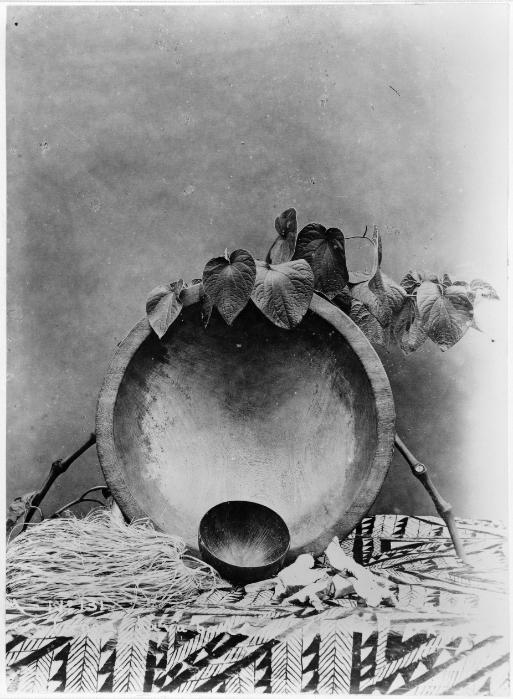
Tanoa bowl on its side, coconut shell drinking cup (ipu ʻava), leaves of the kava plant and strainer

The bowl in which the drink is prepared is called a tanoa or laulau. The former word is the more frequently used. The bowls vary in size from twelve to thirty inches and they stand on short rounded legs varying in number from four to twentyfour. It is unusual to find a bowl that has a greater depth than six inches and the majority are perhaps not more than three or four inches deep. A brim of a width varying according to the size of the bowl runs round the top of the tanoa, and a flange or sometimes a projecting piece of the original wood is left under the bowl. This is pierced by a hole through which a piece of afa (native sennit) is threaded for suspending the bowl from a house post. The tanoa is usually made from the wood of the ifilele tree (Intsia bijuga), a hard-grained timber of a reddish-brown colour. When the bowl was finished it was soaked in fresh water for a considerable time to remove the woody smell. ʻAva often was also allowed to remain indefinitely in the tanoa in order that the inside might acquire an enamelled appearance. This enamel or sheen is called tane. In earlier bowls the legs were tapered towards the bottom and reduced there to about a half an inch in diameter. Chiefs and orators, high and low, use the same type of tanoa. At ceremonies, the bowl used is that belonging to the chief or orator at whose house the ceremony is being held.

=== Cup - ipu tau ʻava ===
The coconut shell cup used for distributing the ʻava is made from the half shell of a ripe coconut and it is cleaned and polished. It is sometimes ornamented with different designs, and with early European contact, it was sometimes decorated with inlaid silver. The Samoan name for this cup is tauau or generally, ipu tau ʻava (ʻava cup).

=== Strainer - fau ===
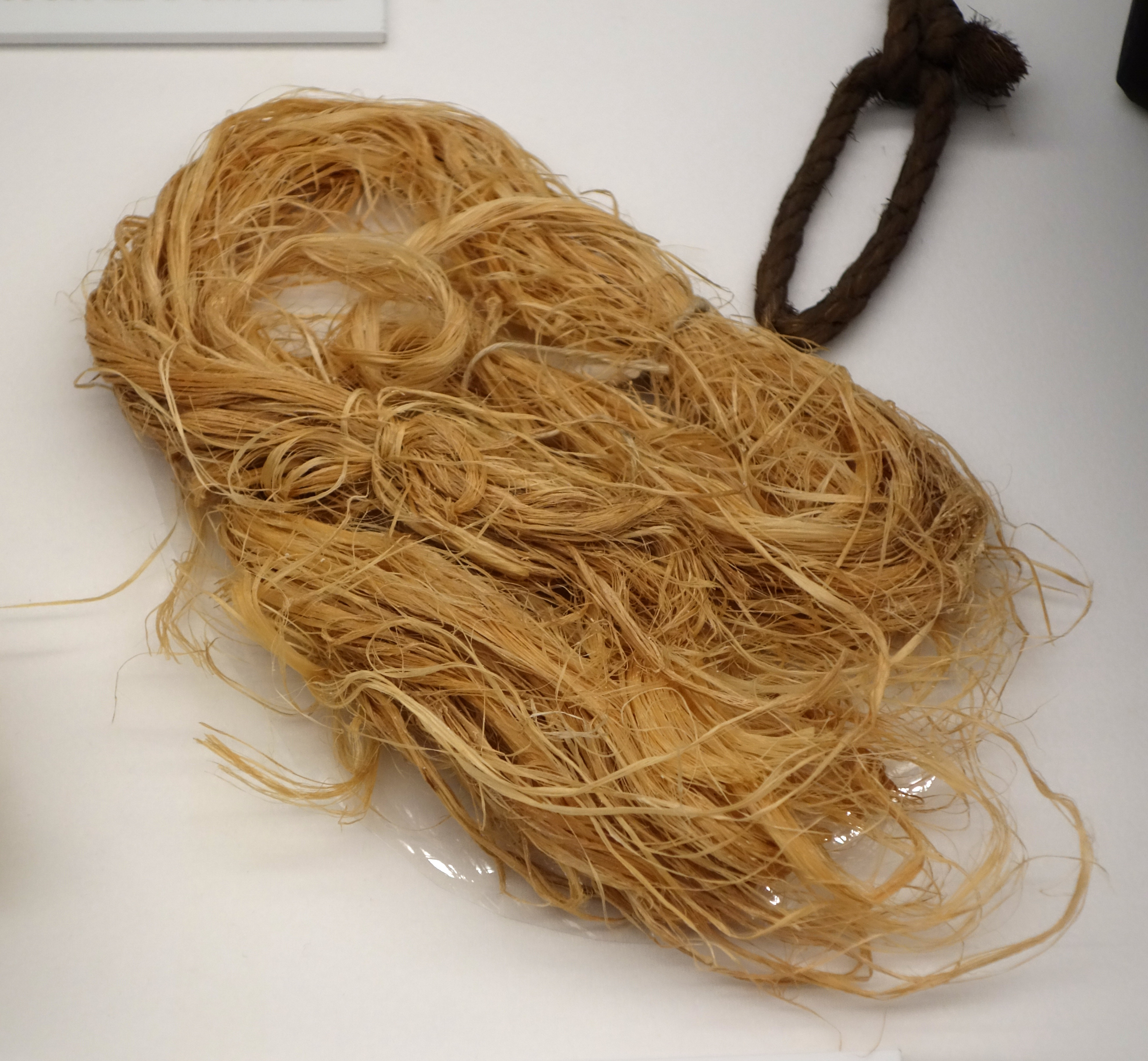
Loose fibre ʻava strainer

The material for straining the woody fibre of the dried ʻava root is obtained from the bark of the fau tree (Hibiscus tiliaceus). This bark is stripped off and the outer skin removed. The remaining inner bark is then shredded and forms a stringy and fibrous mesh, used to mix and strain the beverage in the bowl.

== Ceremony ==
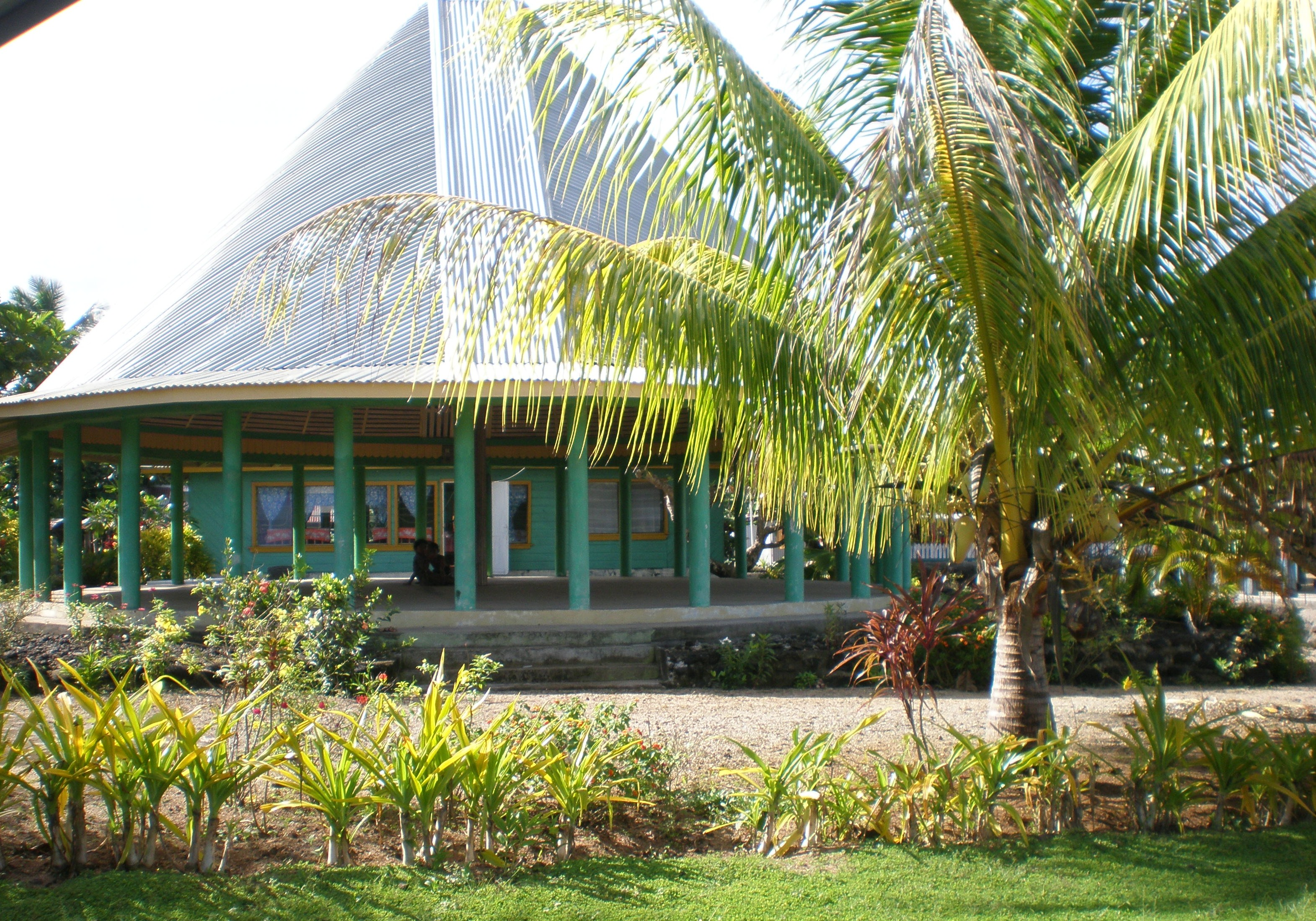
A round open fale tele meeting house in Avao village. Architecture of Samoa define seating areas for the ʻAva ceremony.

The ʻAva Ceremony takes place in most important occasions including the bestowal of a chiefly title (saofa'i), formal occasions and events, the welcoming and farewells of guests and visitors or significant gatherings and meetings (fono).

=== Seating position ===
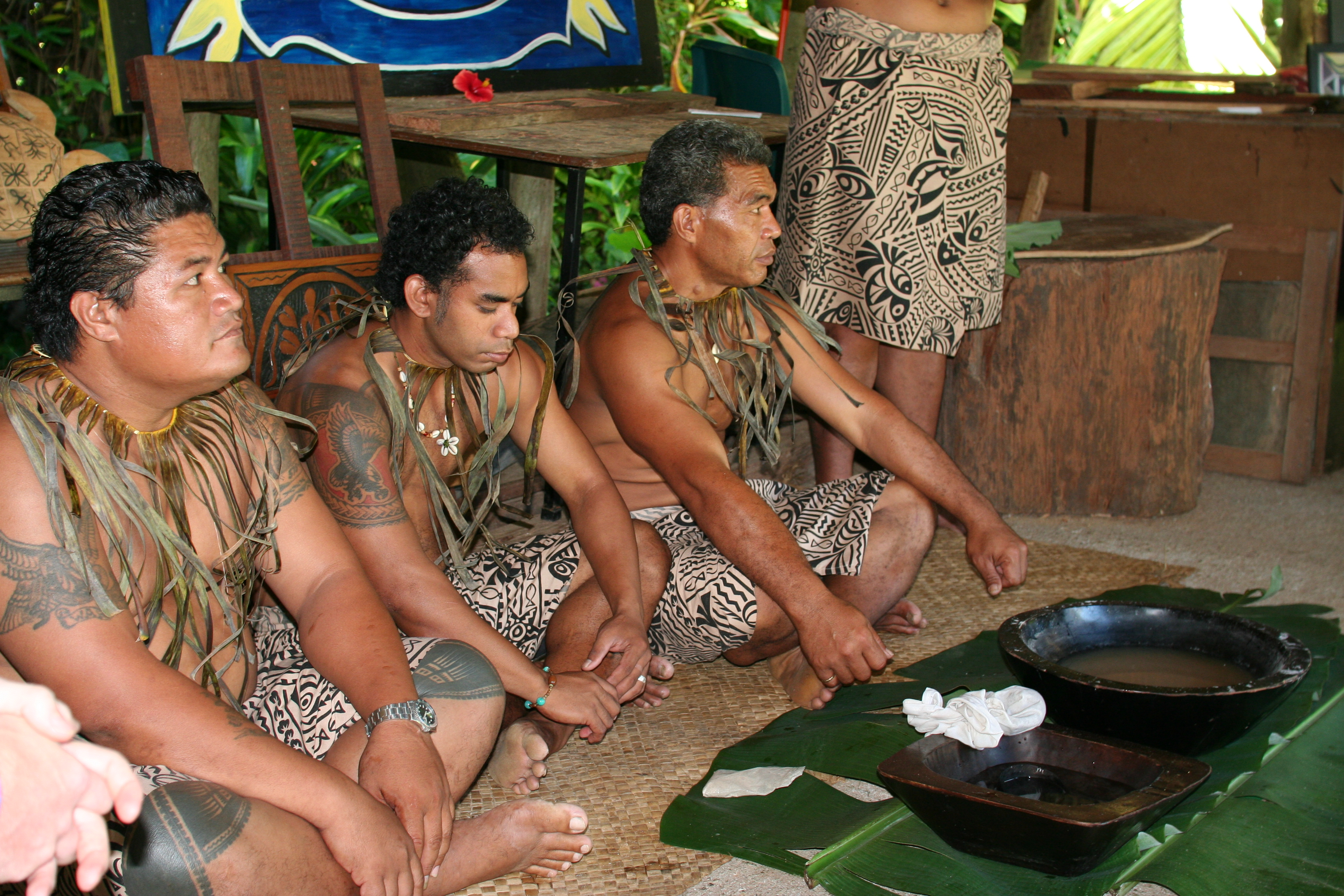
Ava Ceremony in Va`a-o-Fonoti, Samoa

Most of the ceremony takes place in a circular pattern with everyone seated cross-legged on the floor, or on the ground if it takes place outside in an open ceremonial area (malae). At all formal gatherings of chiefs and orators there are defined positions in the houses where each shall sit. The middle posts/termed matua Tala are reserved for the leading chiefs and the side posts on the front section termed Pou o le pepe are occupied by the orators chiefs. The posts at the back of the house talatua indicate the positions maintained by the ʻava makers and assistants. Architecture of Samoa define spatial areas where the front is that part facing or closest to the main road or thoroughfare in a village, while the back is the part of the house farthest removed from road. If the ʻAva ceremony takes place outside in the open space of the village commons (malae), the same seating position is kept in relation to the roadway (or the space considered the front of the village).

=== Roles ===
In general, the ʻAva ceremony takes place within a set social pattern involving a Host party and a Visiting party (or 'guests') with certain prescribed roles in the ritual. Apart from the 'guests' and 'host' party the key roles in the ceremony include;

- ʻAumaga - ʻAva makers, seated centre rear of the 'circle', comprising a mixer (male or female) seated behind the wooden bowl with several assistants beside them. Also called "auagai" (assistants) or "autausi" (caretakers).
- Tufaʻava - ʻAva distributor, usually an orator chief, who calls out, one by one, the names and the order of those to be served with the 'ava beverage. Also called "sufiʻava," "puleʻava," or "folafolaʻava."
- Paluʻava - ʻAva mixer, male or female, seated in a central role with the wooden tanoa bowl in front of them.
- Suiʻava - Seated on the right beside the ʻava mixer; the suiʻava adds water. Also called "agaiʻava."
- Tāfau - Usually stationed behind the 'ava mixer, ready to catch the fau strainer tossed behind over the right shoulder by the ʻava mixer. The tāfau shakes out the excess root fibre and tosses it back to the ʻava mixer's waiting hand over the right shoulder.
- Tautuʻava - ʻAva server, also called "solialiʻi."

Selection for these roles in the ʻava ceremony is an honour and each person must perform their role according to protocol.

==== ʻAva distributor ====
The man who calls out the ʻava titles is termed the tufaʻava (ʻava distributor) and he indicates who is to receive the ʻava by calling out the individual's name or ʻava title if they have one. His role for the ceremony can be compared to that of a master of ceremonies. The tufaʻava must be fully conversant with the correct names and titles of those present as well as ceremonial etiquette.

==== ʻAva makers ====
The ʻava is prepared by a member or members of what is termed the ʻaumaga (ʻava makers). The term ʻaumaga is also used to refer to the assembly of all young men and untitled males (without matai titles) in a village.

Today, in the Samoa ʻava ceremony, the role of the ʻaumaga is a comprehensive term, but in former times the ʻava makers were a much more select guild. In the preparation of the ʻava for a ceremony the services of a young woman or young man, or one or more young ladies and young men may be utilised. It is customary for the daughters of all chiefs to be taught how to prepare the ʻava. If the person mixing the ʻava is a young woman, it is customary for her to be the virgin daughter of a chief (matai). The ʻava mixer, sits behind the tanoa bowl and thoroughly mixes the ʻava as another member of the ʻaumaga adds water from time to time. As the mixing proceeds, the ʻava mixer from time to time wrings the liquid from the strainer and folding the same into half its usual length passes it to another member of the ʻaumaga standing outside or near the edge of the house who frees the strainer of the woody particles of the ʻava by several violent flicks. He then quickly passes the strainer back to the mixer who proceeds until all the particles of the dried root are removed. The stylised movements and serious concentration in the making of the ʻava are part of the ritual pattern in the ceremony. The water poured into the bowl as the mixing proceeds is done from either the left or right, not from in front. The action of mixing is one of contracting and expanding the fingers of the two hands as the strainer is slowly worked towards the mixer. When the mixing is completed the rim of the bowl is wiped to remove any water or woody material and the strainer is folded up and placed on the rim of the bowl. The mixer then places both hands on the bowl and sits quietly awaiting the next move in the ceremony.

Before that was vetoed by early missionaries, it was customary for the dried ʻava root to be chewed by one or more of the members of the ʻaumaga. Those chosen for this work were possessed of clean mouths and good teeth and they were required to thoroughly rinse out their mouths before commencing their duty. When the ʻava had been sufficiently chewed it was spat out on to the leaf of a banana or breadfruit or taro and carried and deposited in the ʻava bowl.

There is no rule governing the strength of the ʻava. If the root is plentiful, the drink is naturally made several degrees stronger than if it is in short supply.

==== ʻAva server ====
The man who actually carries and hands the drinking cup to the people assembled is termed the tautuʻava (ʻava server, also called "soliali'i"). He stands alongside the ʻava bowl and the ʻava mixer, after dipping the strainer into the liquid raises it with both hands and wrings a quantity of the brew into the kava cup held in the right hand of the tautuʻava. The ʻava server then listens carefully for the call from the tufaʻava (distributor) and is thus apprised of the correct individual to be served.

Once the name is called, the tautuʻava walks towards the person indicated, keeping his left hand with the palm outwards firmly lodged in the small of his back. Immediately he hears the ʻava title called and is aware of the status of the individual named, the tautuaʻava, if the chief to be served is the holder of an important chief title, raises the cup above his head and advances towards the chief.

When the server is within comfortable reaching distance of the chief to be served, he uses a slow sweeping movement from right to left and with the inner side of the forearm presented to the chief to hand him the cup.

Presentation to lesser chiefs takes the same form except that the cup is not held above the head but is extended at arm's length at about the height of the waist. The back of the lamb is presented to Orators when being handed the ʻava cup. Both these motions and attitudes are indicative of respect.

=== Start ===
During the process of making the ʻava, which can be seen by everyone seated, or just when the manufacture is completed, an orator chief from the host party will call out words such as;-

O le agatonu lena o le fesilafaiga i le afio mai o le malaga fesilafa'i e lenei nu'u ua usi nei o le a faasoa a e tula'i se Tautu.

This is the ʻava of the reception to our visitors who we now meet in our village - it is ready and will be distributed now and the ʻava server will stand up.

These opening words vary according to the individual orator and the reason for the ceremony. All those assembled then clap their hands loudly and slowly. The tautuʻava then stands up and the distribution of the ʻava takes place. The name of each individual is called in turn and they are served a cup of ʻava to drink until everyone has partaken.

=== Serving order ===
Each person is served once. The first person to receive the ʻava is the highest chief of the visiting party, and he is followed by the highest chief of the host party or village. The leading orator of the visiting party is then served followed by the leading orator of the village and so on. Objections are quickly raised if a chief or orator is served out of turn as it is considered an affront by the man who should have received the cup and serious disputes have frequently arisen as a result of careless or deliberately wrong distribution. The distribution of the ʻava requires tact and skill, depending on the circumstances and each particular ceremony, although it is also an honour to be served last.

==== Matai title bestowal ====
If the ʻava ceremony is part of a matai title bestowal ceremony, then it will be the new matai who is served first.

=== Ritual action and words ===
The ʻava server, tautuʻava, serves the cup to the person called, then steps back a respectful distance to wait until the person served has partaken of the beverage.

On the ʻava cup being presented to a chief he takes it in his right hand and after a moment's pause, he spills a few drops onto the floor of the house on his right side at the same time speaking a few words in a low tone. Today these words have some Christian significance but in olden times were no doubt a form of prayer to one of the numerous gods. He then raises the cup and says Ia manuia which means be happy or prosperous. He then drinks a varying quantity of the ʻava and throws any remainder over his shoulder. He then hands the cup back to the tautuʻava who steps forward and returns to the refill the cup. Should the person served not desire to drink the ʻava he may take a mouthful and then spew it out, or he may merely touch the cup held in the hand of the bearer or he may take hold of the cup and holding it out in front of him address a few remarks to the assembly, finally exclaiming Ia manuia.

In earlier days the orators always held the cup in both hands when it was presented to them. This custom is very often disregarded nowadays.

==== Reply ====
In connection with the act of drinking the ʻava, when the recipient of the cup calls out Ia manuia the assembly reply – Ia manuia or Soifua, the latter word meaning 'may you live'. The act of throwing by the drinker of the remainder of the contents of the cup over his shoulder may have been an unspoken desire that all misfortune should likewise disappear as it is noted that unconsumed ʻava is never returned to the bowl.

Orators as a class have no ʻava titles and when the cup is offered to them the ʻava caller merely announces 'This is the cup of so and so.'

=== Ending ===
When all have been served, the tufaʻava calls out words such as;

Ua moto le ava, mativa le fau, papaʻu le tanoa, faasoa i tua nei ena tee.

A little kava remains, there is not much for the strainer to absorb, the kava in the bowl is shallow - the remainder will be divided amongst those at the back of the house.

If all the kava has been consumed before minor chiefs have been served they must go without, but if chiefs of importance happen along, a fresh brew is made and the ceremony is repeated. The completion of the ʻAva ceremony is usually followed by a shared feast.

== See also ==
- Tongan Kava Ceremony-Taumafa Kava, similar in Tonga
- Samoan plant names
- Faʻamatai, chiefly system of governance in Samoa.
- Samoan language
