= 2004 Niuas Noble by-election =

April 7, 2004
Candidate	Lord Fotofili
Party	Independent

A by-election was held for the Niuas Noble seat to the Legislative Assembly of Tonga on 7 April 2014. It was triggered by the death of the constituency's incumbent representative, Lord Ma'atu, on 17 December 2004.

== Result ==
Lord Fotofili was elected to the Legislative Assembly.
