= Taufa =

Polynesian god

In Tongan mythology, Taufa was a sea god worshipped by chief Tungi of East Tongatapu and by the royal family of Tonga because he cured the Tongan king George I (ruled 1845–1893).

He also protects gardens. In order for a homeowner to gain this protection, they had to braid a coconut leaf into a shark shape.

Taufa is both a sea and a land god. As a sea god he appears as a shark.

== See also ==
- Polynesian mythology
