= Niuas Nobles' constituency =

Electoral constituency in Tonga

Niuas Nobles
- Constituency for the Legislative Assembly of Tonga
- Region: Niuas
- Electorate: 3

Current constituency
- Created: 1914?
- Number of members: 1
- Member: Lord Fusituʻa

Niuas is an electoral constituency which sends one representative to the Legislative Assembly of Tonga. It covers the islands of Niuafoʻou and Niuatoputapu.

Since its inception in 1875, the Assembly has consisted in representatives of the people and in members of the nobility. Following constitutional reforms in 2010, designed to strengthen democracy in the kingdom, the nobility elect nine representatives, while the people elect seventeen. The nobles' constituency in the Niuas thus overlaps with a peoples' constituency, which also elects a single representative.

Members of the nobility whose title is attached to lands in the constituency may vote there, and be elected as the constituency's representative. Nobles do not formally stand as candidates, however, and never belong to any political party. Following the 2010 electoral reforms, any person holding more than one title, corresponding to lands in several constituencies, may only vote in one constituency. The titles corresponding to the Niuas are Fotofili, Fusituʻa, Maʻatu and Tangipa, meaning that the constituency may have up to four voters. At present, the holder of the title of Fotofili also holds the title of Kalaniuvalu, which entitles him to vote in the Tongatapu constituency. The Maʻatu title is vacant. Thus, the constituency actually consists in between two and three voters.

== History, recent elections and members ==
The constituency as such did not exist for the first Assembly in 1875. At that time, there were twenty nobles in all the kingdom, and they all sat in the Assembly, along with twenty elected peoples' representatives; the islands of Niuafoʻou and Niuatoputapu were each associated with a title, and therefore each had a noble representing them. As the number of titles of nobility was increased by successive monarchs, a constitutional amendment in 1914 provided that the nobles would henceforth elect seven among them to represent them; the number of peoples' representatives was also decreased to seven. The nobles' constituency of Niuas, as such, may have been established at this time.

Records of elections are sparse. In the 1996 general election, the Honourable Fusituʻa was elected; there is no further information. Nor is there any information for the 1999, 2002 or 2005 general election results. In the 2008 election, three votes were cast in the Niuas: two for Lord Tangipa, and one for Lord Fotofili; the former was thus duly elected. In the 2010 election, specific voting figures were not reported, but Lord Fusituʻa was elected with a single vote, which suggests that only one vote was cast. This may be explained by Lord Fotofili opting to vote in Tongatapu, and Lord Fusituʻa himself not casting a vote (or voting blank), so that Lord Tangipa's lone vote could elect him.

Lord Fusituʻa died on 24 April 2014, leading to a by-election on 21 May. His son, the new Lord Fusituʻa, was elected unanimously with two votes to take his seat. In August 2020 the seat was declared vacant due to Fusituʻa's failing to attend Parliament for over a year. A by-election will be held to fill the vacant seat.

=== Members of Parliament ===
Prior to 1981

no information

Since 1981

Election	Member
1981	Lord Fusituʻa
1984	Lord Fusituʻa
1987	Lord Ma'atu
1990	Lord Fusituʻa
1993	Lord Fusituʻa
1996	Lord Fusituʻa
1999	Lord Ma'atu
2002	Lord Ma'atu
2004 by-election	Lord Fotofili
2005	Lord Tangipa
2008	Lord Tangipa
2010	Lord Fusituʻa
2014 by-election	Lord Fusituʻa
2017	Lord Fusituʻa
2021	Lord Fotofili

== Election results ==
=== 2014 by-election ===
Niuas Noble by-election, 2014
Party	Candidate	Votes	%	±%
Independent	Lord Fusituʻa (Mataʻiʻulua ‘i Fonuamotu)	2	100%	0
Turnout		2	66.7%	
Majority		2	100%	
Lord Fusituʻa gain from Lord Fusituʻa (his late father)		Swing	n/a	

=== 2010 ===
Tongan general election, 2010: Niuas Nobles
Party	Candidate	Votes	%	±%
Independent	Lord Fusituʻa	1	100%?	n/a
Majority		1	100%?	n/a
Lord Fusituʻa gain from Lord Tangipa		Swing	n/a	

=== 2008 ===
Tongan general election, 2008: Niuas Nobles
Party	Candidate	Votes	%	±%
Independent	Lord Tangipa	2	66.7%	
Independent	Lord Fotofili	1	33.3%	
Majority		1	33.3%	

== See also ==
- Constituencies of Tonga
