= Vai Lahi =

Volcanic crater lake on Niuafoʻou, Tonga

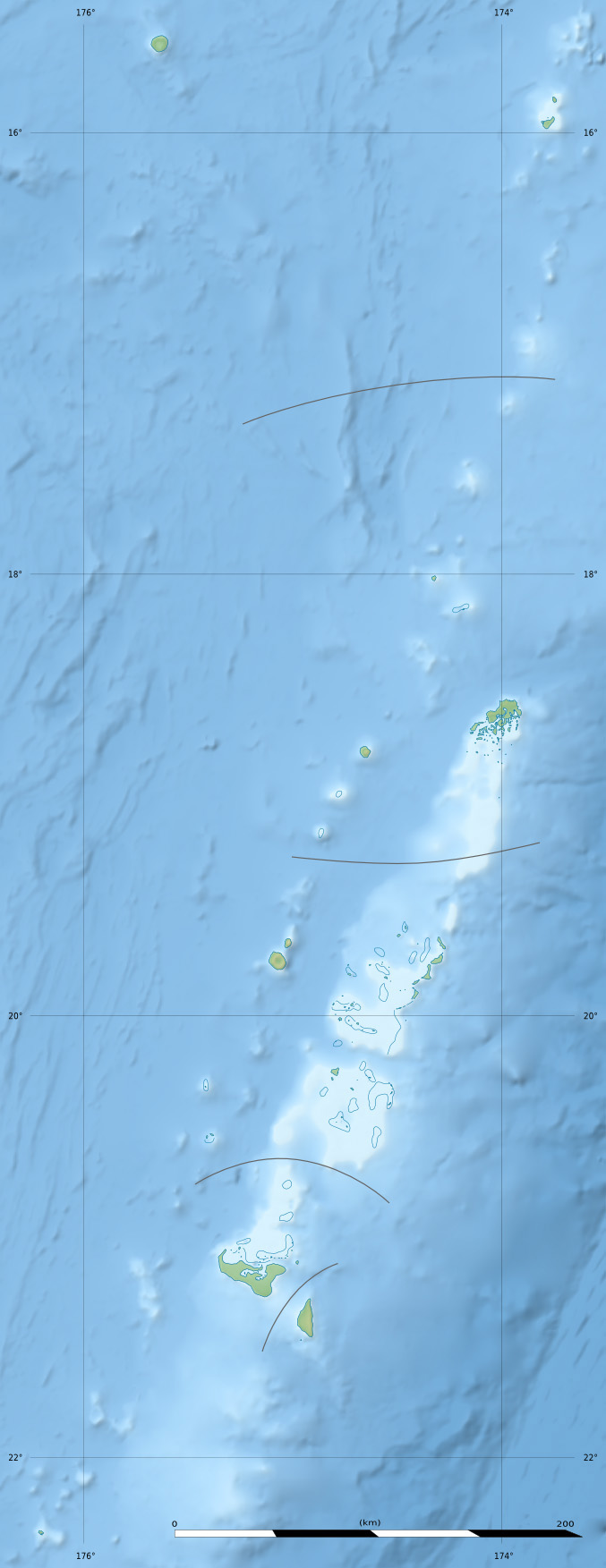
- Location within Tonga
- Location: Tongan island of Niuafoʻou
- Coordinates: 15.605°S 175.64°W
- Type: Volcanic crater lake
- Max. length: 4.5 km (2.8 mi)
- Max. width: 4 km (2.5 mi)
- Surface area: 13.6 km^{2} (5.3 sq mi)
- Max. depth: 121 m (397 ft)
- Water volume: 1 km^{3} (0.24 cu mi) approx

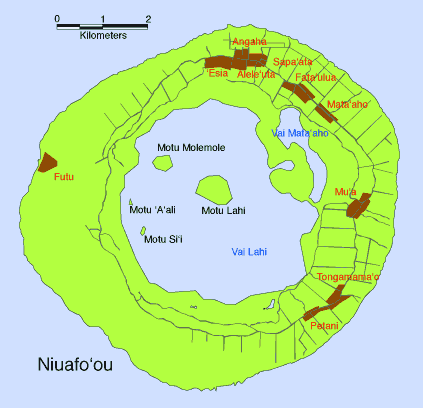
Map of Niuafoʻou, showing Lake Vai Lahi

Vai Lahi (Tongan: Big water) is the central crater lake of the Tongan island of Niuafoʻou. The island is the most northerly island of Tonga, is the most northerly island in the kingdom of Tonga, and is located some 570 km north of the kingdom's main island, in addition to that Tongatapu. Niuafoʻou is annular in shape, the rim of an active volcano. The island ring encloses two large lakes, Vai Lahi and the much smaller Vai Siʻi (also known as Vai Mataʻaho), plus some eight much smaller ponds.

Vai Lahi is a roughly circular crater lake with a diameter of 5 kilometres. Its surface, reported as 23 metres above sea level in 1935, is now believed to be close to sea level. The same survey which reported these new findings also discovered that the depth of the lake is considerably greater than previously thought; long thought to reach a maximum of 84 metres, it has recently been found to be 121 metres deep at its deepest point. The lake has a perimeter of 15.5 kilometres, and a surface area of 13.6 km^{2} (5.3 sq mi). Vai Lahi has a volume of almost one cubic kilometre. The waters of the lake are warm and mildly alkaline.

The lake contains three islands and a submerged island that appears when the water level drops. The largest of these islands is the central Motu Lahi (Big island). The other islands are Motu Molemole, Motu Siʻi, and the ephemeral Motu ʻAʻAli.

Niuafoʻou has been sporadically active throughout recorded history, with six eruptions during the twentieth century. The most violent of these, in 1946, resulted in the evacuation of the island (the first groups of inhabitants were allowed to return to the island in 1958).
