= Hikuleʻo =

Tongan goddess of the world

In the mythology of Tonga, Havea Hikuleʻo is the goddess of the world, Pulotu. The islands of Kao, Tofua, Hunga Haʻapai, Hunga Tonga, Late and Fonualei came from stones thrown down from the skies by Hikuleʻo. They are all volcanic islands. The other, (coral) islands were fished up by her brother or cousin Maui.

== Mythology ==
Hikuleʻo's ancestors were, according to one source, the primordial god and goddess Limu and Kele who came from Pulotu and created the mythical land of Tongamamaʻo for their children to dwell within. They had a son Toiukamea "Hidden Iron" and a daughter Māʻimoaʻalōngona "Royal Game of Hearing" who married each other and had children. This pair seems to be a modern invention, since ukamea "iron" is a word that postdates European contact; other informants leave out this generation.

Among their children was a son Taufulifonua and a daughter Havea Lolofonua. One day as they lie naked on the beach with their legs in the sea, the tide began to rise. An oʻo ("penetrate") fish swam along and began to suck from the girl's labia, which caused her a lot of joy. The fish was chased away, and though the boy tried to gently stroke her inflicted parts, it did not give her relief. Instead of his hand, he used his penis, and suddenly the girl was consoled. Thus, copulation was invented, and Havea Hikuleʻo was the first of many children.

Meanwhile, Taufulifonua and Havea Lolofonua's younger brother and sister, a pair of twins, would marry each other. They were named Fonuʻuta ("Land Turtle") and Fonutahi ("Sea Turtle"), and their child was Maui (Maui Motuʻa, that is; if he was not the child of Taufulifonua and Havea Lolofonua themselves). And the next younger brother and sister (also twins who would marry each other) were Velesiʻi ("Small Enticer") and Velelahi ("Big Enticer") who brought forth Tangaloa (Tangaloa ʻEiki, that is).

When Taufulifonua became old and neared death, he divided up the universe: to Tangaloa was given the sky for dominion, Maui the earth, and Havea Hikuleʻo the sacred underworld Pulotu.

Tangaloa's descendants would later become the (divine) Tuʻi Tonga beginning with ʻAhoʻeitu. Maui's line would become the Tuʻi Talau, while Hikuleʻo's offspring Loʻau would bring forth the Tuʻi Haʻatakalaua.

The historical interpretation of this triumvirate (Hikuleʻo, Maui, Tangaloa) may be a struggle to liberate Tonga from the dominance of the Tuʻi Pulotu empire in Fiji, after which the victors could divide the spoils. Or theoretically they could have been Samoans, which made would have made Tonga and Fiji part of the so-called Tuʻi Manuʻa empire. But without credible evidence or claim, it is still a mystery whether Tu'i Manu'a even existed or had power over the isles of Tonga, Fiji or any other.

== In popular culture ==
Tongan American professional wrestler Taula Fifita performs under the ring name "HIKULEO".

== See also ==
- Saveasiʻuleo

== Notes ==
However, u'amea in Samoan is also an archaic word for a type of lava (known in Hawai'i as ʻaʻā), from u'a ("viscous, glutinous") and mea ("red-brown," as in the color of the manumea, the "reddish-brown bird"). U'a was used in colonial times to refer to iron because it turns the same color ("mea") as it oxidizes.
