= Mataʻiʻulua ʻi Fonuamotu =

Tongan politician (died 2024)

The Honourable Lord Fusituʻa
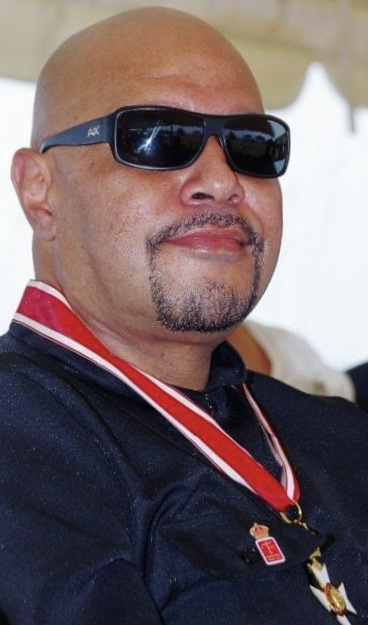
- Fusituʻa in 2015

Member of Parliament for Niuas
- In office 21 May 2014 – 18 November 2021
- Preceded by: Lord Fusituʻa (his father)
- Succeeded by: Prince Fotofili
- Majority: 2 (100%)

Personal details
- Born: 1972 or 1973
- Died: February 2024 Auckland, New Zealand
- Party: none (Nobles' Representative)

Mataʻiʻulua ʻi Fonuamotu, Lord Fusituʻa (died February 2024) was a Tongan politician and noble of the Realm.

Fonuamotu was bestowed with the title Fusituʻa, one of the thirty-three hereditary titles of the Tongan nobility, on 6 May 2014, following the death of the previous title-holder (his father) on 24 April. His father had also been one of the nine representatives of the nobility in the Legislative Assembly of Tonga, sitting for the nobles' constituency of the Niuas islands. His death led to a by-election on 21 May, whereby the nobles in the Niuas elected the new Lord Fusituʻa as their representative to Parliament.

In August 2019 Fonuamotu was medevaced to New Zealand after collapsing in Tonga. He remained in Auckland ever afterwards. On 6 August 2020 his seat was declared vacant due to his failing to attend Parliament for over a year. On 1 September he was re-elected in the resulting by-election.

Lord Fusituʻa was active in several key areas of anti-corruption and global transnational security in Oceania, as well as in the financial technology arena. He was a grassroots and social media educator and advocate for Bitcoin to empower the underbanked agrarian farmers particularly in the area of remittances. He advocated for legislation to allow Tonga to adopt Bitcoin as a national currency.

Fonuamotu vacated his seat before the 2021 Tongan general election as he was in New Zealand for medical treatment. Fonuamotu died in February 2024.

== Honours ==
National honours

- Order of the Crown of Tonga, Commander (July 2015)
