= ʻAhoʻeitu =

Figure in Tongan mythology and history

In Tongan mythology, or oral history, ʻAhoʻeitu is a son of the god ʻEitumātupuʻa and a mortal woman, ʻIlaheva Vaʻepopua. He became the first king of the Tuʻi Tonga (Tongan King) dynasty in the early 10th century, dethroning the previous one with the same name but originating from the uanga (maggots) instead of divinity (see Kohai, Koau, mo Momo).

== Trip to the sky ==
When ʻAhoʻeitu was growing up, his ceaseless curiosity about his paternal heritage was repudiated by his mother, with his habitual inquiries gradually wearing down her resolve. His mother, ʻIlaheva Va'epopua, was an earthly woman living in what is now Popua (called after her name), a suburb of the capital city, Nuku'alofa, and located near the large lagoon of Tongatapu. She was once the mistress of the sky-god, Tangaloa 'Eitumatupu'a, enjoying his affections and cohabitating with him when he visited the earth, an affair that led to the conception of 'Aho'eitu, prompting the sky-god to leave before his son was born. After years of constant queries, ʻAhoʻeitu's mother finally revealed to him the identity of his father. She directed him to the great toa tree, which the lad scaled, landing in his father's realm. He followed the path to which his mother had directed him, and found his father catching doves. ʻEitumātupuʻa was moved to see his son, and invited him to his house for kava and food.

== Sibling treachery and murder ==
Afterwards, the god introduced him to his other sons, ʻAhoʻeitu's older half-brothers, who were the sons of celestial women. These other sons, who were also living in the sky, were at that moment playing sika-ʻulu-toa, a volley-throwing game with javelins made from the wood of the toa (ironwood) tree. When his brothers were introduced to their half-blooded sibling, they grew extremely envious of him. Once they were left alone with 'Aho'eitu, they challenged their brother to join in the game, during which the boy was mortally wounded by one of his brothers' well-aimed javelins. The boy died, and his remains were cooked (some sources say they were not) and cannibalised by his gleeful siblings, who tossed his head into a hoi bush, making it poisonous ever since.

== Resurrection ==
Some time afterwards, ʻEitumātupuʻa sent a woman to fetch ʻAhoʻeitu, but she returned with the message that the boy was not to be found. The god immediately deduced what had happened and confronted his other sons, forcing them to vomit their brother's remains into a kumete (a large wooden bowl, now widely used throughout the South Pacific islands for kava-drinking ceremonies) by tickling their throats. Noticing that the boy's head was missing, ʻEitumātupuʻa sent a messenger to seek out the head and the bones. When the last of 'Aho'eitu's missing remains were located, everything was combined in the kumete, together with water and some leaves from the nonufiafia, which is a known medicinal plant able to revive people who were near death. The contents were then stirred and the bowl covered with banana leaves, and then the process repeated a second and third time, when ʻAhoʻeitu suddenly sat up, body reconstituted and very much alive.

== Resolution ==
He and his brothers were then summoned into ʻEitumātupuʻa's presence, where the god rebuked his elder sons for their treachery. He punished them by confining them to the sky, while ʻAhoʻeitu was sent back to the earth, with divine mandate to become the King of Tonga. The wicked half-brothers repented, and begged their father that they also be allowed to follow ʻAhoʻeitu onto the earth. Their father eventually relented, but stipulated that regardless of their divinity and seniority in age, they and their descendents were to serve ʻAhoʻeitu and his house forever.

== Royal lineage ==
From 'Aho'eitu, the Tu'i Tonga Dynasty that once reigned over Tonga and its historical territories is descended. Although the Tu'i Tonga title itself now lies defunct, its legacy continues through the noble title of Kalaniuvalu, the first holder of which was the Prince Viliami Fatafehi Kalaniuvalu, the son of the last Tu'i Tonga, Sanualio Fatafehi Laufilitonga.

Laufilitonga died on 09 December 1865, after having bequeathed the Tu'i Tonga title, its powers and its privileges to his half-brother's only son, Lord Tu'ipelehake (Siaosi Fatafehi Toutaitokotaha), whose mother was the Princess Sālote Mafile'o-'o-Pilolevu, a daughter of King George Tupou I. Lord Tu'ipelehake then relinquished the title to his grandfather, George Tupou I, thereby uniting the two senior titles of Tu'i Tonga and Tu'i Kanokupolu under the burgeoning Tongan Crown.

The current sovereign of Tonga, King Tupou VI, is directly descended from Laufilitonga through the latter's daughter, the Princess Lavinia Veiongo, who was Prince Kalaniuvalu's twin sister. Princess Lavinia Veiongo the Elder bore 'Asipeli Kupuovanua, whose daughter, Queen Lavinia Veiongo the Younger, was the first wife of King George Tupou II and mother of Queen Sālote Tupou III. This accords the Tupou Dynasty with customary seniority over Prince Kalaniuvalu and his descendants, courtesy of the old fahu system of Tongan kinship.

Apart from this, the ruling House of Tupou are also directly descended from 'Aho'eitu as successors of the Tu'i Kanokupolu, which was a cadet branch of the Tu'i Ha'atakalaua, the regent dynasty established by the Tu'i Tonga Kau'ulufonuafekai to administer Tonga and its territories while the Tu'i Tonga maintained a quiet life in the royal settlement at Lapaha, and conferred upon Kau'ulufonuafekai's own younger brother, Prince Mo'ungāmotu'a. In this regard, it can be reasoned that the Tu'i Tonga dynasty and its kingship are still extant, surviving through its cadet branch, the Tu'i Kanokupolu line, making it the second oldest surviving royal dynasty after the imperial dynasty of Japan.

'Aho'eitu's older brothers were:

- Talafale: he became the Tuʻi Faleua (King [of the] Second House), a spare dynasty in case ʻAhoʻeitu's line would ever die out (which apparently has still not happened). He also became the Tuʻi Pelehake (Favoured Ruler), another very high title. For years, Prince Fatafehi, brother to King Taufa'ahau Tupou IV, kept both titles, but after his death in 1999, only the Tuʻi Pelehake title was inherited by his son, as the Tuʻi Faleua title reverted to the Crown.
- Matakehe: his line became extinct during the reign of the Tuʻi Tonga Tuʻitātui. He, and his younger brother, the Tuʻi Folaha, were the guardians of the Tuʻi Tonga's person.
- Māliepō: his descendants were once the kau tufunga (royal undertakers) of the Tu'i Tonga, responsible for preparing the deceased king's body, supervising funerary procedures and directing the construction of the royal tombs. Māliepō's function has now been superseded by Lauaki and the kau tufunga of the Tu'i Kanokupolu.
- Tuʻi Loloko: his line is still extant. He and his younger brother were to govern in the name of the king.
- Tuʻi Folaha: his lineage came to end during the reign of the Tuʻi Tonga Tuʻitātui. Along with his brother, Matakehe, they were the guardians of the Tuʻi Tonga's person, with the title ultimately having a bloodline directly connected to Houma, a village in the south-west of Tongatapu.

ʻAhoʻeitu has become the namesake for several other generations of his chiefly and royal descendants. The current king, Tupou VI, for instance, was baptised as Prince ʻAhoʻeitu ʻUnuakiʻotonga Tukuʻaho.
