= Tafahi =

Island of the Tonga archipelago

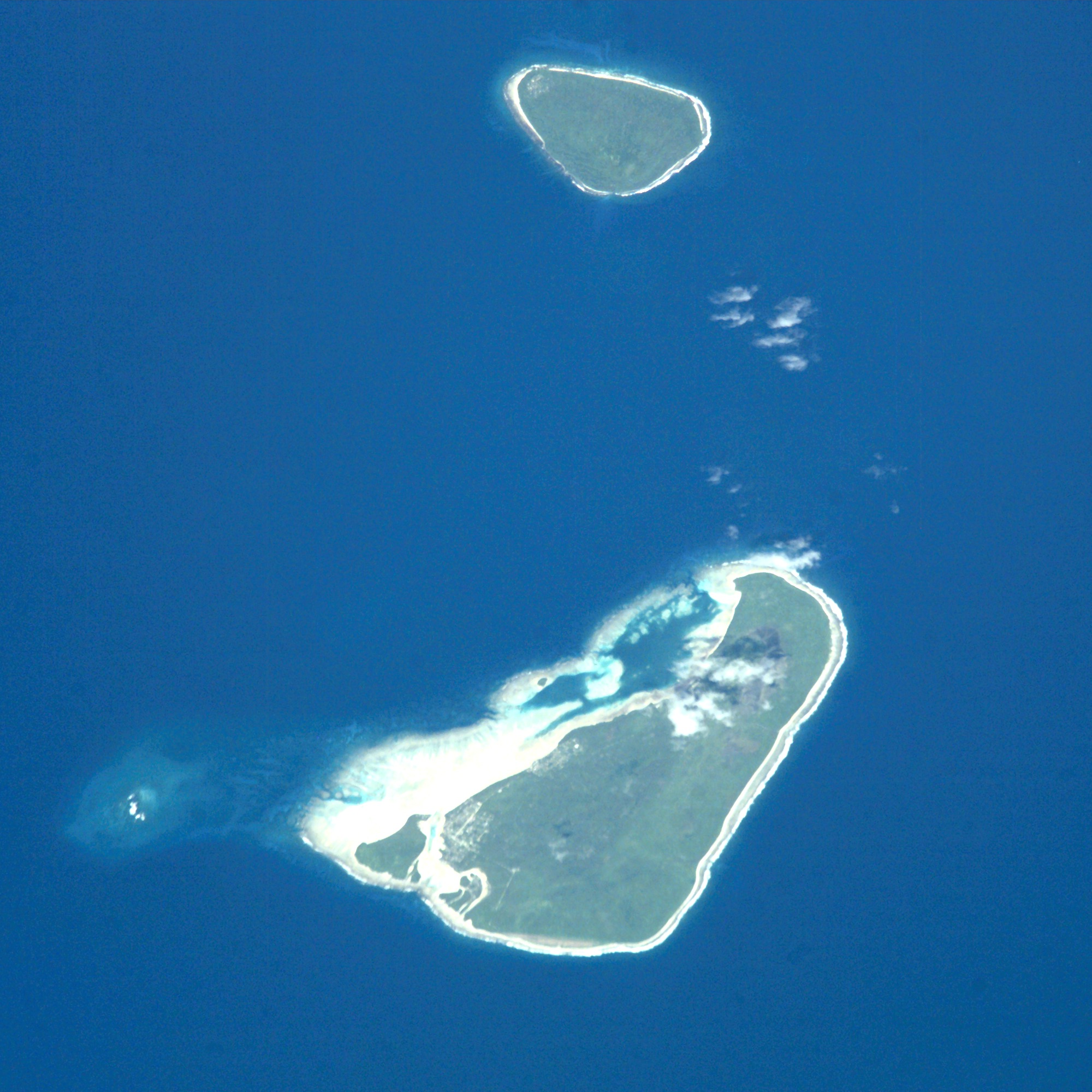
- NASA picture of Niuatoputapu and Tafahi.

Highest point
- Elevation: 546 m (1,791 ft)
- Prominence: 546 m (1,791 ft)
- Coordinates: 15°51′S 173°43′W

Geography
- Location: Tonga

Geology
- Formed by: Subduction zone volcanism
- Mountain type: Stratovolcano
- Last eruption: Unknown

Tafahi is a small (1.2 km × 2.8 km or 0.75 mi × 1.74 mi) island in the north of the Tonga archipelago, in fact closer to Savaiʻi (Samoa) than to the main islands of Tonga. It is only 9 km (5.6 mi) north-northeast away from Niuatoputapu, and fishermen commute in small outboard motorboats almost daily between the two. The island has a population of 14 (in 2021).

Other names for Tafahi are Cocos Eylant (coconut island) or Boscawen island.

== Geography ==
Tafahi is a volcanic island and has the typical cone shape of a stratovolcano. The mountain is called Piu-ʻo-Tafahi (fanpalm of Tafahi) and is 546 m (1,791 ft) high. (The island, 3.42 km^{2} (1.32 sq mi), is smaller than Niuatoputapu, but higher). The soil is extremely suited for growing kava and vanilla, whose exports to the rest of Tonga and beyond is the main occupation of the population.

The harbour (merely an opening in the fringing reef, only passable by small boats) is at the northwest of the island. A steep staircase leads up to the village, with about 69 residents at the census of 2001, located on a plateau on the north side of the mountain. There is a government primary school.

== Myth ==
It is told in local mythology that some naughty ʻaitu from Samoa one night wanted to steal the mountain of Niuafoʻou to bring it to Samoa. It started off well for them, they got the mountain, leaving Niuafoʻou behind with a big lake in its centre, and were dragging it through the sea, already halfway near Niuatoputapu. They had to hurry because ʻaitu law prescribed that they had to complete the work before sunrise.

But the fish god Seketoʻa saw them and did not like it. He ordered his matāpule (spokesmen) to cry as roosters, in the hope that the ʻaitu would think that dawn was close and they could as well give up. But it did not work, the ʻaitu were not ready yet to give up and only pulled harder. Then Seketoʻa himself acted. He swam in front of the ghosts, showing them his anus, which was red. The ghosts were frightened. They thought they saw the red sun rising and that it was already morning. They dropped the mountain and fled to Samoa. That is the reason that Tafahi is now where it is.

The legend has been interpreted as an account of a historic volcanic eruption.

== History ==
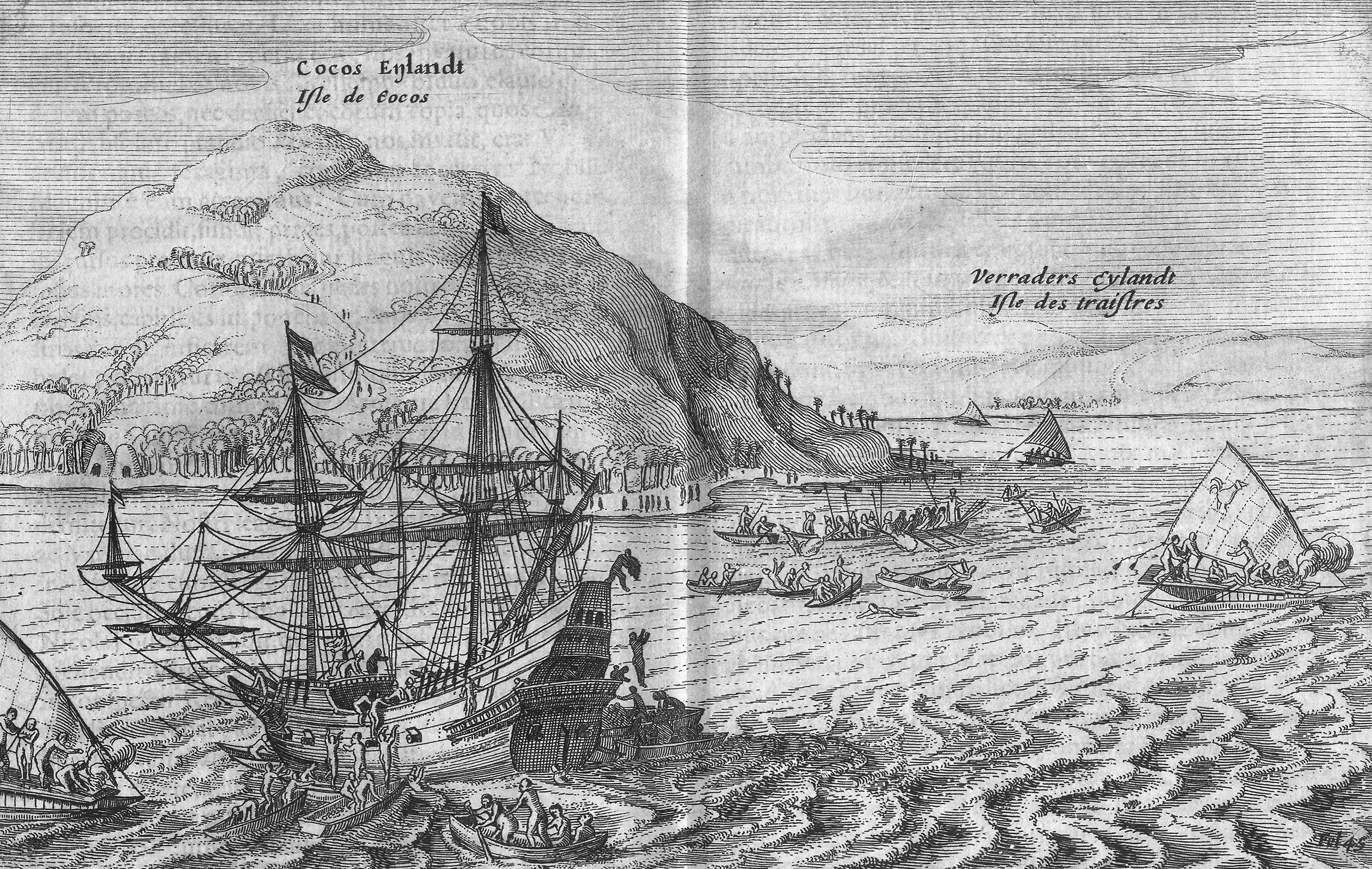
Dutch sailors Willem Schouten and Jacob le Maire were the first Europeans to see Tafahi and Niuatoputapu in 1616.

Tafahi was put on the European maps by Willem Schouten and Jacob Le Maire during their famous circumnavigation of the globe in 1616. They gave it the name Cocos Eylant because of the abundancy of coconut palms. A multitude of natives in their outrigger canoes came to see their visitors. As the explorers describe in their journal, the natives were peaceful, willing to come on board, leaving barely any space for the Dutch themselves, and they traded large quantities of coconuts and ubes roots (probably ʻufi (yam)) for iron nails and strings of beads. But as the island did not offer a suitable place to anchor, the ship the Eendracht (Unity) proceeded next to Niuatoputapu.

It is speculated by Swiss author Alex Capus that Robert Louis Stevenson, the author of Treasure Island, uncovered the lost Treasure of Lima on this island around 1890 while living on the nearby island of Upolu, which made him and his family very rich.

== Language ==
Jacob LeMaire tried to collect words from the natives. He put 32 words in his journal as the Vocabulaer: Oft Tale van d'Eylanden Salomonis, and some more of the Tale van het Cocos Eylant. It was not until 1945 that it was discovered that those labeled as from Cocoa Island were in reality words from Futuna, and those mislabeled as the Solomons Islands (where the Eendracht would not come at all) were actually from Tafahi. The many errors (e.g., the printer in Holland printed an 'n' as a 'u') do not help in the analysis. In addition, when the Dutch left Tafahi for Niuatoputapu, many canoes from there had already come to them. LeMaire probably recorded a mixture of the languages of both islands. When the words from his list are compared to modern Tongan, Samoan, ʻUvean and Futunan, as well as Fijian, it appears that they come from all of the languages, but mostly from Futunan and Samoan.

Nowadays the people from Tafahi and Niuatoputapu speak Tongan. But up to the 19th century both islands must have had a quite distinct language. In 1835 the missionary Peter Turner, on his way to Samoa, had a stop in Niuatoputapu and found that "there are many Samoans here…". The theory that the Tuʻi Tonga empire had thoroughly "Tonganised" its colonies using Loʻau's Falefā cannot be maintained.

The real subjection of Niuatoputapu and Tafahi to Tonga does not start until the establishment of the Haʻafalefisi line and the Māʻatu chiefly line in Niuatoputapu.

== See also ==
- List of volcanoes in Tonga
