= Siaosi ʻAlokuoʻulu Wycliffe Fusituʻa =

Tongan noble

Siaosi ‘Alokuo’ulu Wycliffe Fusitu’a

Speaker of the Legislative Assembly
- In office 1990–1998
- Preceded by: Hon. Malupo
- Succeeded by: Lord Veikune

Member of the Tongan Parliament for Niuas Nobles' constituency
- In office 25 November 2010 – 24 April 2014
- Preceded by: Hon. Tangipa
- Succeeded by: Mataʻiʻulua ʻi Fonuamotu
- In office 14 February 1990 – 10 March 1999
- Preceded by: Lord Ma'atu
- Succeeded by: Lord Ma'atu
- In office 1 May 1981 – 1987
- Succeeded by: Lord Ma'atu

Personal details
- Born: 27 January 1927
- Died: 24 April 2014 (aged 87) Nukuʻalofa
- Spouse: 'Eseta Fusitu'a

Siaosi ‘Alokuo’ulu Wycliffe Fusitu’a, styled Lord Fusitu’a (27 January 1927 – 24 April 2014) was a Tongan politician and noble. He was Speaker of the Legislative Assembly of Tonga from 1990 to 1998.

== Early life ==
Fusitu’a was born a commoner and was adopted by Tevita ʻAlokuoʻulu. He was educated at Wesley College, Auckland, the University of Auckland, and Australian National University, where he studied law. He worked in the Printing Department and then for the Supreme Court of Tonga as an interpreter. In 1967 he married 'Eseta Fusitu'a. He was appointed to the noble title of Fusitu’a in 1981.

== Political career ==
He was first elected into Parliament as the Niuas Noble Representative in the 1981 Tongan general election. He lost his seat in the 1987 election to Lord Ma'atu. He was a member of the Anti-Communist League, and during the 1990 election he led the conservative, anti-democratic faction among the nobles, attempting to enlist the church to back a "church and state" campaign and encourage a member of the royal family to stand as a people's representative on Tongatapu. After being elected, he was appointed Speaker, a position he held until 1998. As Speaker he clashed frequently with pro-democracy People's Representatives such as ʻAkilisi Pōhiva, and was in turn targeted by them as an example of the moral bankruptcy of the government. He lost his seat at the 1999 election on a coin-toss, but was re-elected in 2010.

He died in Nukuʻalofa in 2014 and was succeeded as Lord Fusituʻa and as Niuas Noble Representative by his son Mataʻiʻulua ʻi Fonuamotu.

== Honours ==
National honours

- Order of Queen Sālote Tupou III, Grand Cross (31 July 2008).
