= Kalaniuvalu Fotofili =

Tongan noble and politician (born c. 1975)

Member of the Tongan Parliament for Niuas Nobles' constituency
- Incumbent
- Assumed office 18 November 2021
- Preceded by: Lord Fusituʻa

Personal details
- Born: ~1975 (age 50–51)
- Spouse: Marcella Taumoepeau-Tupou (m. 2010)

Kalaniuvalu Fotofili, styled Prince Kalaniuvalu Fotofili (born ~1975), is a Tongan noble and politician.

Fotofili is the youngest son of Mele Siuʻilikutapu. He was appointed Lord Fotofili following the death of his older brother in April 2010. On 28 August 2010 he married Marcella Taumoepeau-Tupou. In July 2014 he was granted the title of "His Serene Prince Kalaniuvalu Fotofili".

He was elected to the Legislative Assembly of Tonga at the 2021 Tongan general election after being supported by his predecessor Lord Fusituʻa. He was re-elected unopposed at the 2025 election.
