= Tangaloa =

Family of Tongan gods

Tangaloa was an important family of gods in Tongan mythology. The first Tangaloa was the cousin of Havea Hikuleʻo and Maui, or in some sources the brother or son or father of them. He was Tangaloa ʻEiki (T. lord), and was assigned by his father, Taufulifonua, the realm of the sky to rule.

Among his offspring the following are found: Tangaloa Tamapoʻuliʻalamafoa, Tangaloa ʻEitumātupuʻa, Tangaloa ʻAtulongolongo, and Tangaloa Tufunga. But different sources disagree about the exact family relations between any Tangaloa. Tangaloa Tufunga (T. carpenter) was known as an adze maker. Tangaloa ʻEitumātupuʻa is known in Samoa as Tagaloa Eitumatupua (T. ghost and riddle; an eitu or aitu is a second rank god of somewhat malevolent nature).

== ʻEitumātupuʻa ==
A big toa ('ironwood tree) reaching into the sky grew on the island of Toʻonangakava between Mataʻaho and Talakite. Tangaloa ʻEitumātupuʻa climbed down from the sky and saw a beautiful woman shellfishing. Her name was ʻIlaheva also known as Vaʻepopua from the island Niuatoputapu. They cohabitated and the god went back up. He returned and they slept and he went up, many times. One day they overslept and a tern flying over saw them and woke them up. Therefore one island is called Tala-kite (tern-see) and the other Mata-ʻaho (Eye-of-day).

ʻIlaheva became pregnant and bore a son. After a while the god returned down from the sky and told her to name him ʻAhoʻeitu (day has dawned). Then, when the woman answered him that her place was sandy, he said he would throw some clay down from the sky so she could make a plantation for their child. So the hill Holohiʻufi (pour the yam) was made and the heketala (slip tern, a kind of yam) was planted. Then the god did no longer return.

ʻAhoʻeitu grew up and became curious about his father. His mother told him the truth and let him climb the giant toa. In the heavens he found his father and he found he had elder stepbrothers. They did not like him and killed him, but his father resurrected him. Then he spoke that ʻAhoʻeitu should go down to earth where he would become the first Tuʻi Tonga (from divine descent) to replace the Tuʻi Tonga which came from the maggots of Kohai, Koau, mo Momo. Because of their murder his elder brothers, if they wanted to go down too, would have to serve him.

== See also ==
Tangaloa, (or a variant of this name conforming to the local vernacular) is found in many other Polynesian mythologies. He may have exchanged functions with his cousins Hikuleʻo and Maui, or other gods seemingly at random in different places.

- In Sāmoa as Tagaloa.
- In Mangaia as Tangaroa.
- In Manihiki as Tangaroa keeper of fire.
- In Hawaiʻi as Kanaloa, symbolized by the squid or heʻe.
- In Tahiti as Ta'aroa.
- In Marquesas Islands, as Tanaʻoa or Takaʻoa.
- In Aotearoa as Tangaroa god of the sea.
