= Tamapoʻuliʻalamafoa =

Polynesian god

In the Polynesian mythology of the Tongan island of ʻAta, the god Tamapoʻuliʻalamafoa is the king of the heavens. He is the one who ordered (through his servants all called Tangaloa (Tangaloa ʻEiki, Tangaloa Tufunga, and Tangaloa ʻAtulongolongo)) the sub-god Laufakanaʻa to become ruler of that island.

According to others, however, Tangaloa ʻEiki was the ancestor god and Tangaloa Tamapoʻulialamafoa, Tangaloa ʻEitumātupuʻa, Tangaloa ʻAtulongolongo, and Tangaloa Tufunga his offspring.
