= Seketoʻa =

Tongan fish deity

Seketoʻa was a fish god from Niuatoputapu and Tafahi in Tongan mythology.

Originally Seketoʻa was a mortal, the grandson of Puakatefisi, the first of the traditional line of rulers of Niuatoputapu island, the Māʻatu dynasty. Puakatefisi had a son by a concubine of his, named Falefehi. That son had two sons, the oldest with the name Moimoi, and the younger was called Seketoʻa. As common in Polynesia, the older son could command the younger in executing the orders of their father. Still Seketoʻa was more beloved by his father than Moimoi. Or so the latter believed, and he planned to kill his younger brother.

Moimoi ordered Seketoʻa to come to his house. The latter obeyed, and sat down outside the former's house, crosslegged with his head bowed and his hands clasped in front, awaiting orders as required by custom. Moimoi told him to come in. But Seketoʻa was suspicious and said that any commands could be given to him here. Soon Moimoi became angry, went inside and came out with a pōvai (big cudgel), and threw it at the other. But Seketoʻa jumped up so quickly that it missed him. Then he grabbed the club himself and yelling bakola (Fijian for: die you wrench) he ran with it towards the other. Moimoi resigned and did not defend himself: "Do what you like to me, Seketoʻa, for I am powerless."

Thereupon Seketoʻa threw down the club and said that he would go to drown himself in the sea and become a fish, leaving Moimoi behind to run the errands for Māʻatu. And he, Seketoʻa, would watch the seas of these islands until the end of the world, that no fish would ever kill a person, and Māʻatu would have the right to call him anytime and he then would come in the shape of a fish.

According to legend, descendants of Ma'atu have the right to ask for and receive help from Seketoa. He will send out two of his matāpule (official chiefly spokesmen) to throw kava roots in the sea. That will attract two suckerfish, who are the matāpule of Seketoʻa. They will come and then go. Then a small shark comes and goes. And a medium shark comes and goes. And finally a big shark comes. That is Seketoʻa, and Māʻatu will speak to him.

Seketoʻa had an important contribution to the creation of Tafahi.

Seketoʻa is also known away from Niuatoputapu and Tafahi, but less widely and more vague. There he is sometimes named as the father of ʻIlaheva.
