= Lauaki =

Lauaki may refer to:

== Tongan people ==
- Epalahame Lauaki
- Sione Lauaki

== Tongan title ==
- Lauaki (royal undertaker)

== Other ==
- Lauaki Namulauulu Mamoe
