= Limu (Tongan mythology) =

Primeval Tongan god of creation

In the Polynesian mythology of Tonga, Limu is the primeval Tongan god of creation, whose union with the goddess Kele produced the deity Touiafutuna, from whom all creation descends.

== See also ==
- Tongan mythology
