= 'Ilaheva =

Woman in mythology of Tonga

ʻIlaheva
- Noblewoman
- Born: c. 900; Tongatapu (possibly Niutoputapu, Niue, or Samoa)
- Spouse: Tangaloa ʻEitumātupuʻa
- Issue: ʻAhoʻeitu
- Father: Seketoʻa
- Mother: unknown

In the mythology of Tonga, ʻIlaheva Vaʻepopua (ʻIlaheva, living at Vaʻepopua) was a mortal woman, the daughter of Seketoʻa. Seketo'a was either a chief of Tongatapu, or perhaps a god from Niuatoputapu, depending on the source. All accounts, however, agree that 'Ilaheva became the wife of Tangaloa and mother of ʻAhoʻeitu, the first divine king of the Tuʻi Tonga dynasty in Tonga, around 900 AD.

Her name was ʻIlaheva. She lived near Vaʻepopua in Tongatapu. Her chief or noble relative may have lived in Tongatapu, but perhaps also in Niutoputapu, Niue, or Samoa. ( E. W. Gifford, 1924)

ʻIlaheva was a noble Tongan woman mentioned in Tongan mythology. She is known as the mother of ʻAhoʻeitu, who became the first Tuʻi Tonga (sacred king of Tonga). According to tradition, ʻIlaheva lived near Vaʻepopua in Tongatapu, where she met the god Tangaloa ʻEitumātupuʻa, who descended from the heavens. Their union produced ʻAhoʻeitu, who later ascended to the sky to meet his divine father and eventually established the royal Tongan dynasty ( E. W. Gifford, 1924).
