= Kohai, Koau, mo Momo =

Kohai (who?), Koau (I, me), mo (and) Momo (crumb) were in the Tongan mythology the first human beings created on earth. They came forth from the uanga (maggots, fruitfly larvae; apparently also in Tonga seen as a source of generatio spontanea). Their being-first status has elevated them from mere mortals into the realm of divinity, and added mystical significance to their names. According to one informant Kohai was a woman, Momo a man, and the third one was forgotten. Another informant saw Kohai for the future, Momo for the present and Koau standing for the past. Yet another: Kohai came from the head of the maggot, Koau from the tail, and Momo is not mentioned. Kohai became the first Tuʻi Tonga.

This dynasty of the Tuʻi Tonga, descendant from the maggot, is not to be confused with the real or divine Tuʻi Tonga dynasty, which started with ʻAhoʻeitu. It is a possibility that these uanga people refer to the ancestral homeland of the Tongan people, known as Pulotu.

Nevertheless, it is still customary for poets nowadays to recite or invent dynasties for the chiefs they want to please, going back to Kohai, Koau & Momo.
