= Tevita ʻAlokuoʻulu =

Tongan noble and politician

Lord Fusituʻa
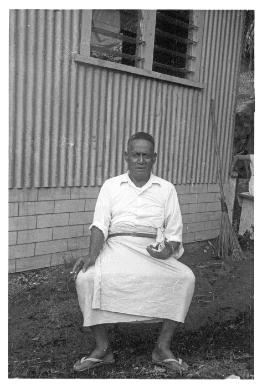
- Lord Fusitu'a 1967

Member of the Legislative Assembly
- Constituency: Tongatapu

Personal details
- Born: 1908
- Died: 15 October 1973 (aged 65)

Tevita ʻAlokuoʻulu, Lord Fusituʻa (1908 – 5 October 1973) was a Tongan noble and politician.

== Biography ==
Born in 1908, ʻAlokuoʻulu acceded to the Fusituʻa title – one of the three members of the nobility of Niuafoʻou – in 1929 at the age of 21.

He was later elected to the Legislative Assembly as one of the nobles representing Tongatapu.

ʻAlokuoʻulu died in October 1973 at the age of 65, at which point he was the longest-serving noble in Tonga.
