= Niuafoʻou =

Volcanic island in Tonga

Niuafoʻou (volcano)
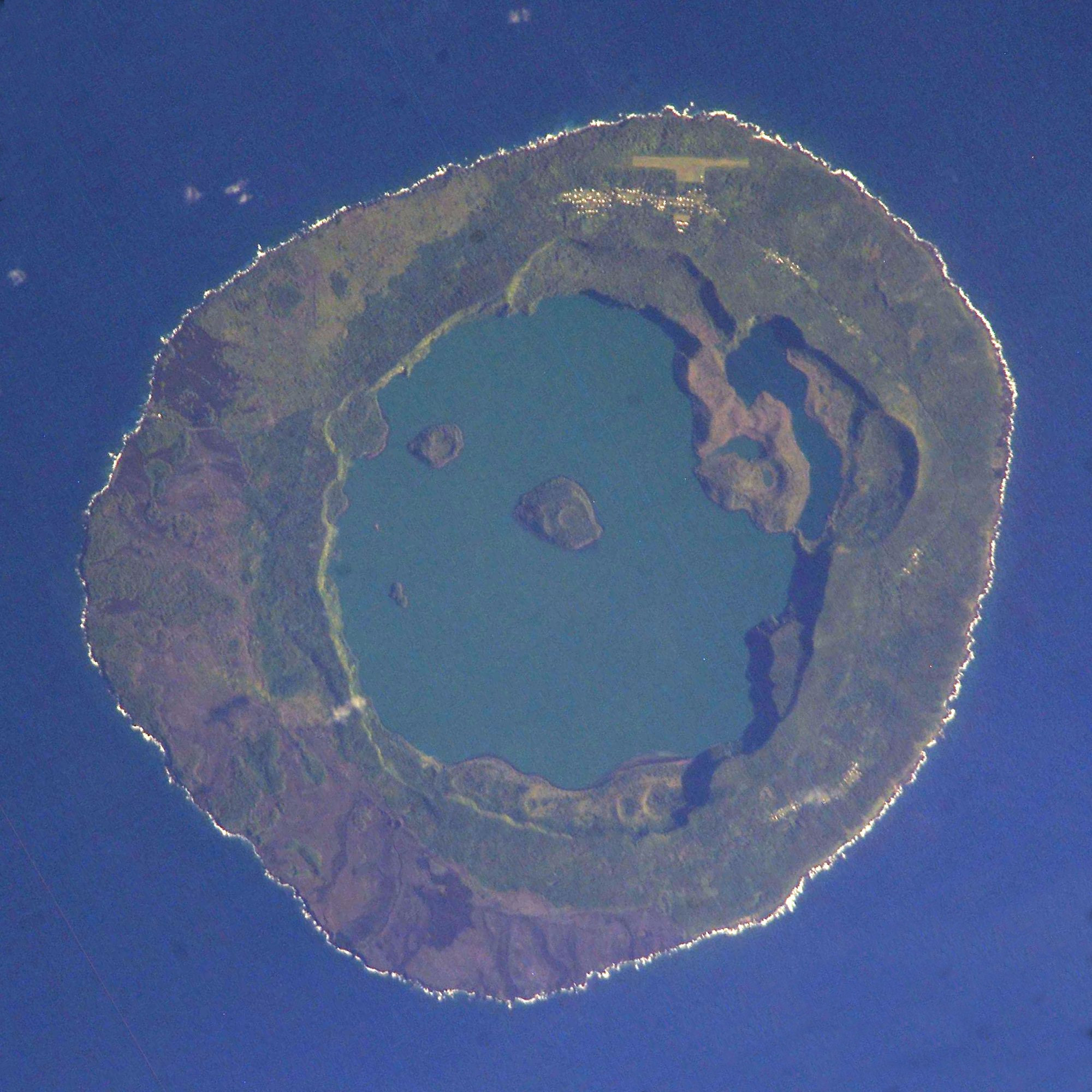
- Niuafo'ou from the International Space Station, 2005-03-19

Highest point
- Elevation: 260 m (850 ft)
- Coordinates: 15.60°S 175.63°W

Geography
- Location: Tonga, Oceania

Geology
- Formed by: Subduction zone volcanism
- Mountain type: Shield volcano
- Last eruption: March 1985

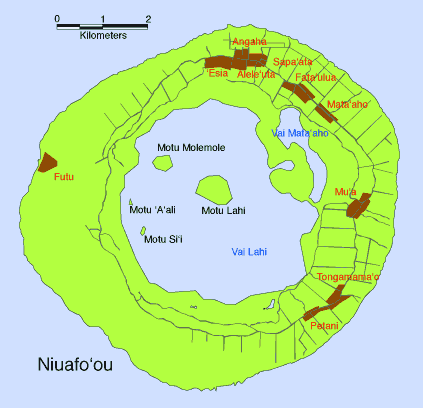
Map of Niuafoʻou Island

Niuafoʻou (meaning 'many new coconuts') is the northernmost island in the kingdom of Tonga. One of the Niua Islands, it is located in the southern Pacific Ocean between Fiji and Samoa, 574 km (357 mi) north of Tongatapu island group and 337 km (209 mi) northwest of Vavaʻu. It is a volcanic rim island with an area of 15 km^{2} (5.8 sq mi) and a population of 431 (as of 2021). The volcano is active and has erupted regularly since 1814, with its last major eruption in 1985.

The Niuafoʻou language is spoken on the island.

== Geography ==
Niuafoʻou is a volcano located on an underwater ridge 190 kilometres (120 mi) west of the line along which all the other volcanoes of Tonga are ranged. The island contains a steep-sided caldera; its rim is over 120 metres (390 ft) high. It rises to a height of 250 metres (820 ft) at Mokotu. The coastline is rocky and steep, with only a few beaches, all of which are stony, with black sand. The only landing place on the island is at the end of a lava flow in Futu, in the western part of the island. All the villages are in the north and east. Public places — like the post office, telecommunications station and airport (Kuini Lavinia Airport) — are in Angahā in the north; there is a high school in Muʻa.

The island ring encloses two lakes. The larger one, Vai Lahi, is a crater lake 23 m (75 ft) above sea level, 4 km (2.5 mi) wide, and 84 m (276 ft) deep. It contains three islands and a submerged island that appears when the water level drops. Vai Lahi is separated from the smaller lake, Vai Siʻi (or Vai Mataʻaho), by a desolate landscape of sand hills. The inner walls of the crater lake, and the island's eastern and western slopes, are forested. Either one or both are soda lakes.

=== Volcanic activity ===
The island is an active volcano, and has erupted regularly since 1814. In 1853, an eruption destroyed the village of ʻAhau and killed 25 people. An eruption beginning in August 1886 destroyed buildings and crops and created a new island in the lake. Another in 1912 involved thirty active cones and threw lava to a height of 500 feet (150 m). In 1929, an eruption destroyed the village of Futu, cut off the harbor, and killed all the vegetation on the western slopes of the island. In December 1935, an eruption centered on the Ahofakatau and Hina craters caused the evacuation of Belani and Togamamao, and produced a 2-mile-wide (3 km) lava flow. An eruption in September 1943 destroyed crops but caused no loss of life.

1943 eruption in Niuafoʻou

A serious eruption began on 9 September 1946, beginning with a series of tremors and then a lava flow which destroyed the village of Angaha, including the government buildings and the wireless station. The village of Aleleuta was also destroyed, and lava flows had left only one third of the island still habitable. When radio contact was lost, an RNZAF aircraft on a flight to Samoa was requested to investigate, and reported the eruption to the outside world. The eruption was followed by a series of violent earthquakes. While the inhabitants initially planned to stay, in mid-October the Tongan government issued a compulsory evacuation order. An initial attempt to evacuate the island using the New Zealand vessel Matua failed, as the ship arrived before the inhabitants were ready. The island was finally evacuated on December 21. The inhabitants were resettled in Nukuʻalofa, where land had been provided by Queen Salote. In 1948 they were resettled in ʻEua. When they resettled, they named various places in ʻEua after the places they had known in Niuafoʻou. As a result, the two islands now have many of the same place names, and a comparison of names on the two islands shows where each group settled.

In 1958, about half of the population returned to Niuafoʻou, and the rest remained in ʻEua.

=== Geology ===
It is an 8-kilometre-diameter (5.0 mi) shield volcano, with a broad lava shield capped by the remnants of a composite cone, which was destroyed during a caldera-forming eruption. The lavas contain variable amounts of subduction-related components inherited from the Tonga subduction zone to the east in the tholeiitic magma series. These components result in a combination of MORB-like characteristics with those of ocean island basalt.

=== Climate ===
Like most of Tonga, Niuafoʻou has a tropical climate, with the temperature being warm year-round. On 1 February 2016, the temperature of 35.5 °C (95.9 °F) reached on the island is the highest temperature ever recorded in Tonga.

== History ==
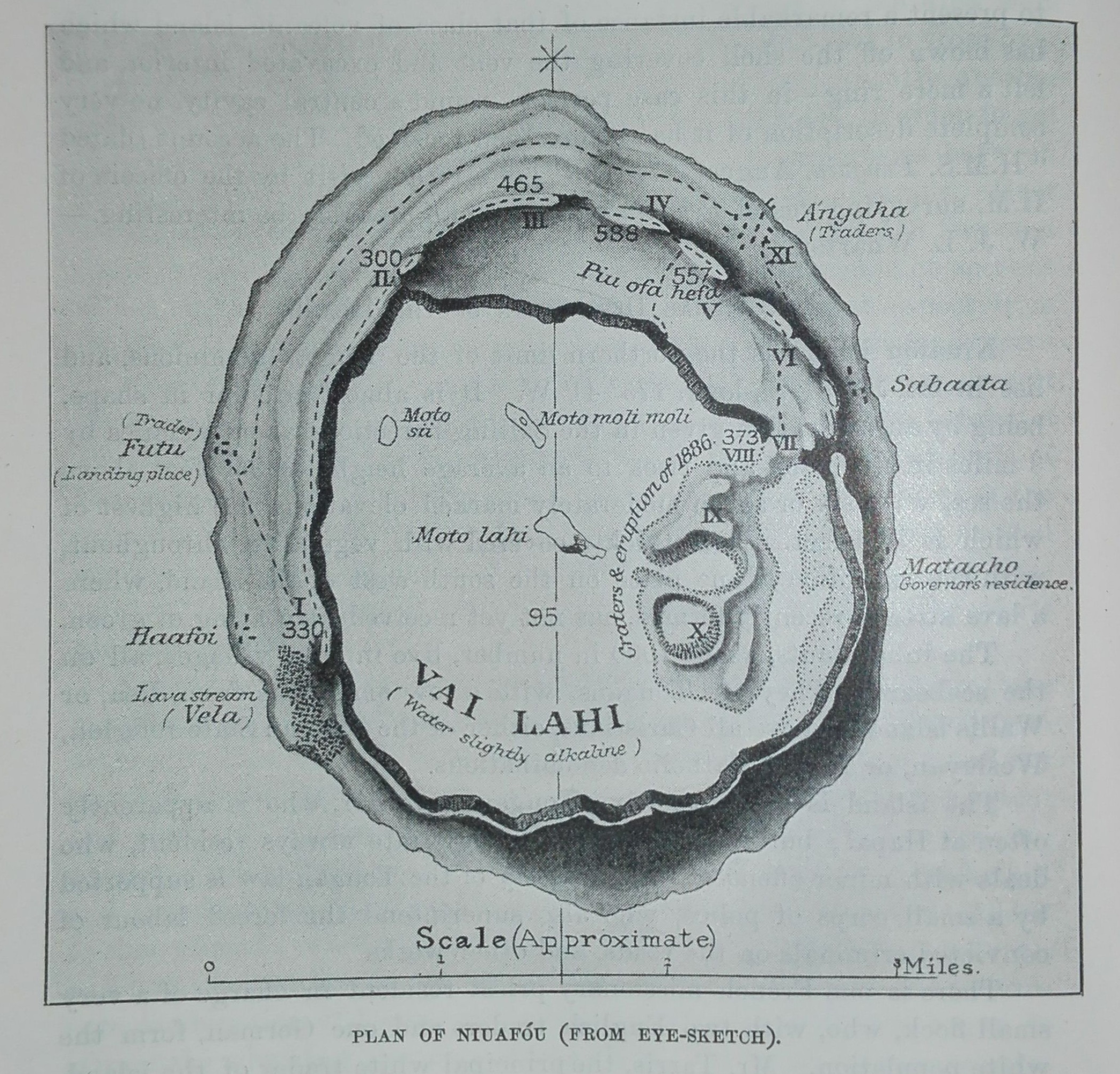
Somervillle's map of Niuafoʻou, published in 1896

Historical population
| Year | Pop. | ±% |
|---|---|---|
| 1996 | 735 | — |
| 2006 | 646 | −12.1% |
| 2011 | 523 | −19.0% |
| 2016 | 493 | −5.7% |
| 2021 | 431 | −12.6% |

According to Niuafoʻou folklore, Niuafoʻou island originally had a mountain, rather than a lake in the middle. But the mountain was stolen one night and placed in the sea, and became the island of Tafahi.

Niuafoʻou was put on the European maps by Willem Schouten and Jacob Le Maire during their famous circumnavigation of the globe in 1616. After their not-so-successful encounter with the islanders of Niuatoputapu, they approached this island with some more hope to find refreshment, so they called it Goede Hoop island. They found black cliffs that were green on top, plenty of coconut trees, some houses along the seaside, and a whole village near a landing place. But their ship, the Eendracht (Unity), could not anchor, so they had to limit themselves with some trade with the Indians who approached their ship in their swift canoes. The trading went well, until the islanders tried to steal one of the ship's small sounding boats, and the Dutch responded by firing on them. After this incident, the Dutch left the vicinity of Niuatoputapu and continued to sail west as they had planned. But they ended up veering northwards, and so happened upon Futuna and Alofi.

Niuafoʻou was visited by a Royal Navy surveying ship, HMS Penguin, in August 1895. Lieutenant Boyle Somerville published a description of the island the following year. He noted signs of recent volcanic activity, writing "[the island] is thickly covered with vegetation throughout, with the exception of one place on the south-west of the island, where a lava stream, recently formed, has not yet received its coating of green".

In April 1909, the island was struck by a severe tropical cyclone, which destroyed houses and killed seven people.

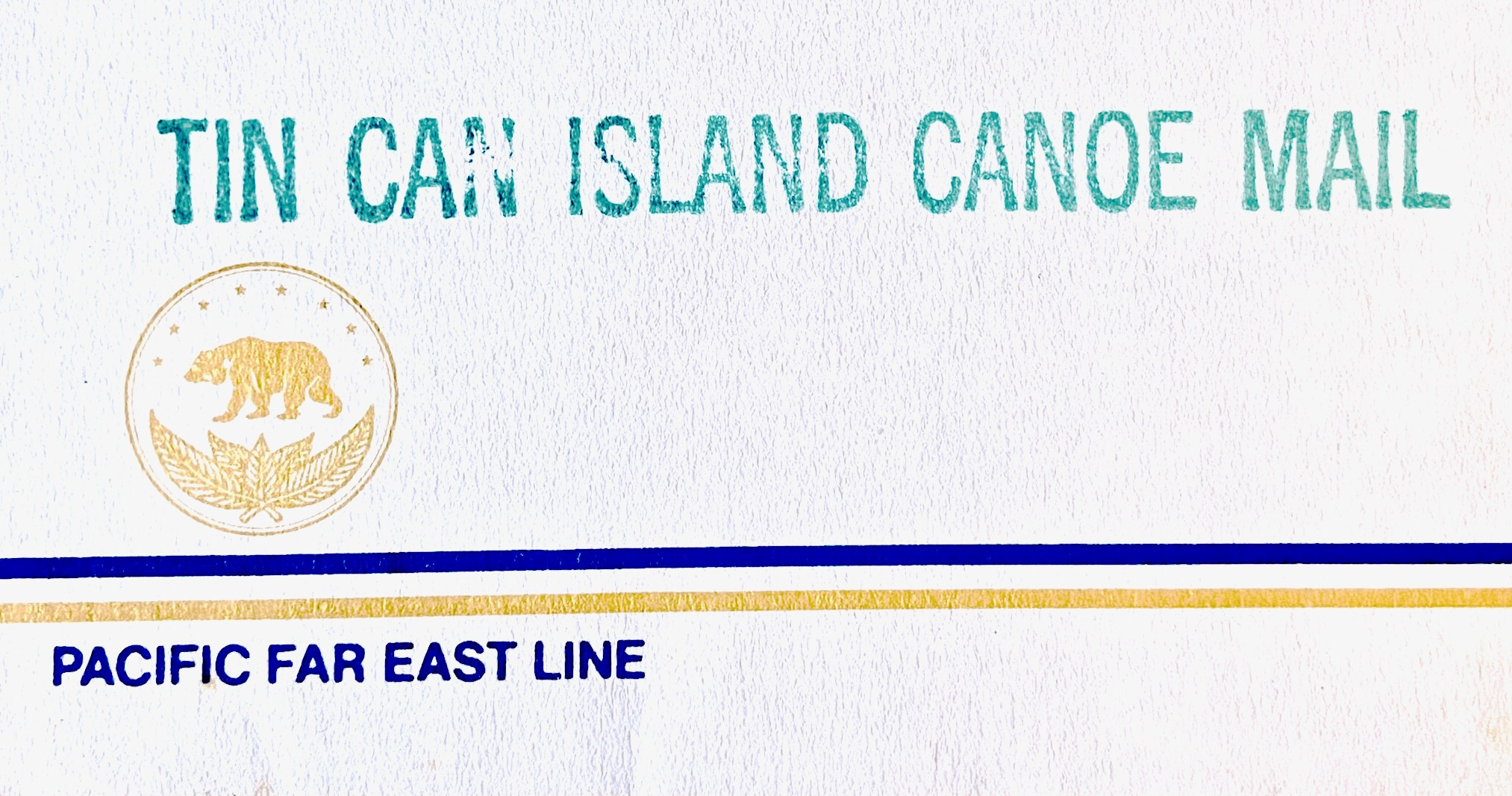
1976 envelope used in canoe mail

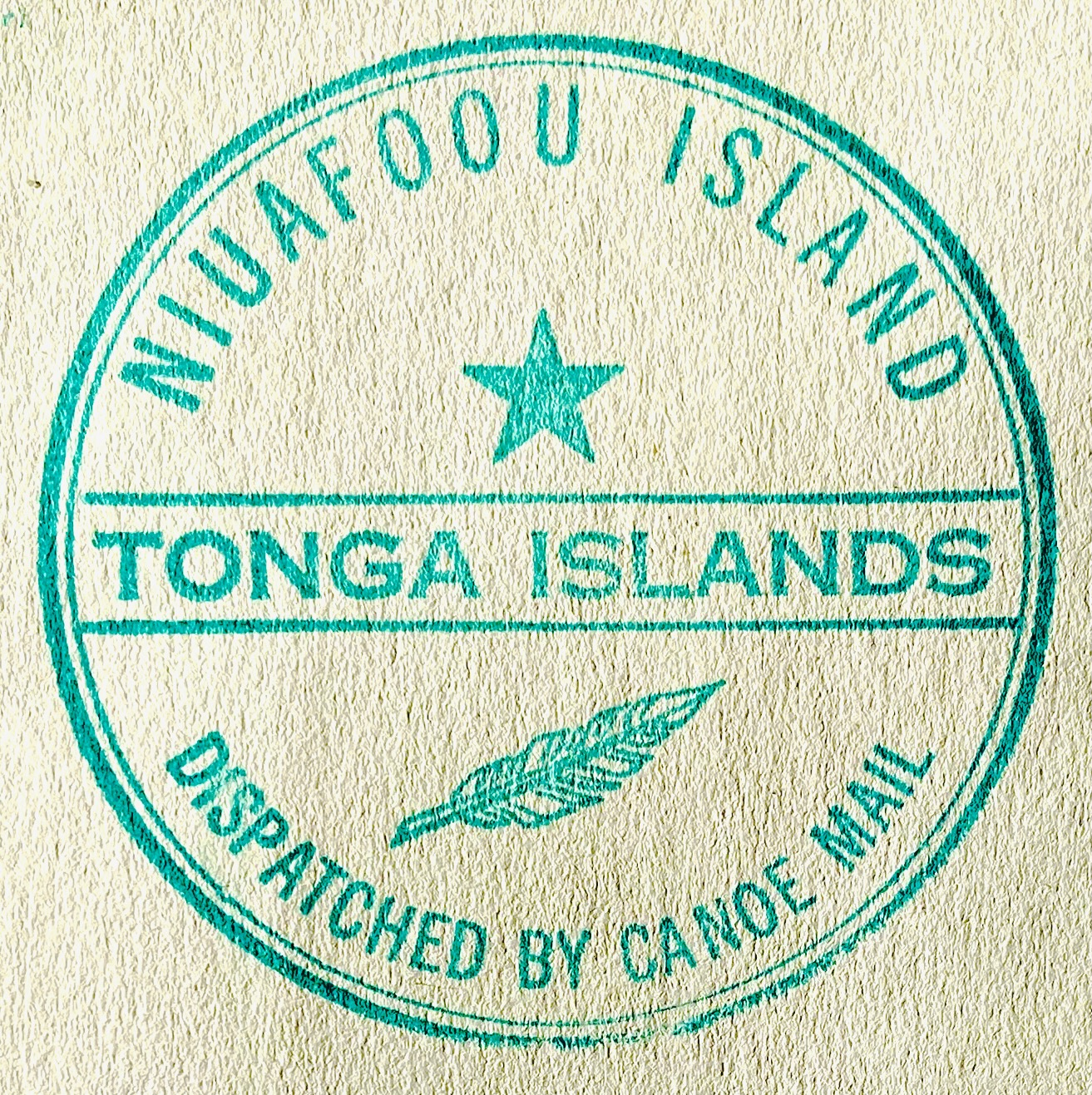
Hand stamp applied to 1976 envelope

By 1912, the difficulty of ships landing had seen the inhabitants implement a "tin can mail service", with mail sealed in a biscuit or kerosene tin thrown overboard from passing ships and collected by swimmers. The popularisation of this method to stamp collectors led to Niuafoʻou becoming known as "Tin-can islands" for many years.

A wireless station was constructed in 1930. That same year, scientists traveled to the island with a 65-foot-long (20 m) camera to observe the solar eclipse of October 21, 1930.

In January 2002, the island was devastated by Cyclone Waka, which destroyed hundreds of homes and killed one person.

== Ecology ==
The island is home to the Tongan megapode.

== See also ==
- List of volcanoes in Tonga
- France–Tonga Maritime Delimitation Convention
