= Public Health Security and Bioterrorism Preparedness and Response Act of 2002 =

- Other short titles: Bioterrorism Preparedness Act of 2001
- Long title: An Act to improve the ability of the United States to prevent, prepare for, and respond to bioterrorism and other public health emergencies.
- Enacted by: the 107th United States Congress
- Effective: June 12, 2002

Citations
- Public law: 107–188
- Statutes at Large: 116 Stat. 594

Codification
- Titles amended: 42: Public Health and Social Welfare
- U.S.C. sections amended: Chapter 6A § 201 et seq.

Legislative history
- Introduced in the House as H.R. 3448 by Wilbert J. Tauzin, II (R–LA) on December 11, 2001; Passed the House on December 12, 2001 (418–2); Passed the Senate on December 20, 2001 (Passed unanimous consent); Reported by the joint conference committee on May 21, 2002; agreed to by the House on May 22, 2002 (425–1) and by the Senate on May 23, 2002 (98–0); Signed into law by President George W. Bush on June 12, 2002

Signed into effect on 12 June 2002, the Public Health Security and Bioterrorism Preparedness and Response Act of 2002 (PHSBPRA) was signed by the President, the Department of Health and Human Services (DHHS) and the U.S. Department of Agriculture (USDA).

It established procedures for preparation for bioterrorism and public health emergencies. It also created the National Disaster Medical System, through which teams of health professionals, such as physicians, pharmacists, paramedics, and nurses, volunteer in emergency situations.

A component of the new rules include security risk assessment of individuals who have access to the select agents and toxins. It is intended to establish new rules for registering the possession, use, and transfer of specific toxins and agents that could endanger the safety and health of people, animals, and plants. Any person who meets the criteria of a "restricted person" as defined in the USA PATRIOT Act of 2001, must not be afforded access to these materials.

== Title I: National Preparedness for Bioterrorism and Other Public Health Emergencies ==
Title I deals with preparation on the federal, state, and local level for bioterrorism and other public health emergencies such as epidemics.

=== Subtitle A: National Preparedness and Response Planning, Coordinating, and Reporting ===
Subtitle A amended the Public Health Service Act to add Title XXVIII: National Preparedness for Bioterrorism and Other Public Health Emergencies. It directed the DHHS, through the Secretary of Health and Human Services, to coordinate a strategy for preparing for and responding to bioterrorism and other public health emergencies, including the preparation of a plan to ensure that the activities of the Secretary regarding bioterrorism and other public health emergencies are coordinated with state and local governments.

It requires the federal government to provide assistance to state and local governments in the event of bioterrorism or other public health emergency and ensure that state and local governments are prepared to detect and respond to such emergencies, including capability for effective public health surveillance and reporting, appropriate laboratory readiness, properly trained and equipped emergency personnel, protection of workers responding to such an emergency, public health agencies that are prepared to coordinate health services during and after emergencies, and participation in communications networks that can publicly and privately disseminate information in a timely and secure manner.

It requires developing and maintaining medical supplies against biological agents that may be involved in an emergency, ensuring coordination and minimizing duplication of federal, state, and local planning, preparedness, response, and investigation of a public health emergency, and enhancing the readiness of hospitals to respond to public health emergencies.

It establishes an Assistant Secretary for Public Health Emergency Preparedness in the Department of Health and Human Services to coordinate efforts on behalf of the Secretary.

It provides for the operation of a National Disaster Medical System, which is a coordinated effort to provide health and auxiliary services to respond to the needs of victims of a public health emergency or be present at locations that DHHS has determined is at risk of a public health emergency. It establishes an advance registration system of health professions volunteers for verifying credentials during public health emergencies. The NDMS now has over 5,000 civilian volunteers and 1,800 participating hospitals. 55 of the 80 NFMS groups are Disaster Medical Assistance Teams, which respond to public health emergencies in the US and internationally. 10 are Disaster Mortuary Operational Response Teams, which are responsible for identification and handling of human remains in mass-casualty situations.

It authorizes the Director of the Centers for Disease Control and Prevention to construct and equip new facilities, renovate existing facilities, and upgrade security in order to better combat threats to public health and support public health activities.

It establishes a system of public health alert communications and surveillance networks between federal, state, and local public health officials, health systems, and any other appropriate entities.

It establishes a temporary National Advisory Committee on Children and Terrorism and an Emergency Public Information and Communications Advisory Committee, which are to submit recommendations to the DHHS.

The DHHS is to develop materials for teaching recognition and identification of potential bioweapons, to develop materials for planning by state and local governments, health care facilities, and emergency personnel to respond to an emergency, to develop programs for testing laboratory and other public health personnel for preparedness, and to disseminate this information.

It authorizes grants and cooperative agreements to provide loans, scholarships, fellowships, or other forms of assistance for training individuals in any category of health professions for which there is a shortage that the Secretary determines are necessary for proper preparation.

It directs the DHHS Secretary to coordinate with the Secretary of Agriculture, the Attorney General, the Director of Central Intelligence, the Secretary of Defense, the Secretary of Energy, the Administrator of the Environmental Protection Agency, the Director of the Federal Emergency Management Agency, the Secretary of Labor, the Secretary of Veterans Affairs, and other federal officials as appropriate to establish a working group on preparedness for bioterrorism and other public health emergencies.

It also revises provisions concerning antimicrobial resistance.

=== Subtitle B: Strategic National Stockpile; Development of Priority Countermeasures ===
Subtitle B directs the Secretary of DHHS, in coordination with the Secretary of Veterans Affairs, to maintain a stockpile of medical supplies for the event of bioterrorism or other public health emergency and directs the Secretary to ensure that a sufficient amount of vaccine against smallpox is available.

It directs the FDA to designate a "priority countermeasure" as a fast track product pursuant to the Federal Food, Drug, and Cosmetic Act. It requires the FDA to give priority to accelerated countermeasure research and development and requires the FDA to issue a final rule within 90 days allowing reliance on animal trials for countermeasures for public health emergencies. It directs the Secretary to periodically evaluate new technology to improve the ability of public health officials to conduct public health surveillance activities relating to bioterrorism or other public health emergency.

It directs the DHHS, in consultation with the Attorney General and the Secretary of Defense, to provide assistance for security to facilities or people involved in countermeasures for bioterrorism and public health emergencies.

It directs the President to make potassium iodide tablets available to state and local governments through the national stockpile to provide protection for people living near a nuclear power plant, and requests that the National Academy of Sciences conduct a study to determine the most effective and safe way to distribute and administer potassium iodide tablets on a mass scale.

=== Subtitle C: Improving State, Local, and Hospital Preparedness for and Response to Bioterrorism and Other Public Health Emergencies ===
Subtitle C makes funds available for national security with respect to bioterrorism and other public health emergencies. Eligible activities include developing coordinated local plans for responding to emergencies, addressing deficiencies in public health needs, purchasing or upgrading equipment to prepare for emergencies, conducting exercises to test emergency response activities, developing trauma and burn center care plans for emergency medical services, improving public health laboratories, training public health and health care personnel, developing systems by which information can be communicated, addressing the safety needs of children and vulnerable populations, ensuring safety of workers, preparing for contamination prevention efforts and for triage and transport in emergencies, training health care professionals to recognize and treat mental health consequences, enhancing training of health care professionals to provide appropriate care for large numbers of individuals, enhancing training to protect the health and safety of personnel responding to an attack, improving preparations for emergency response activities, and improving the ability of existing telemedicine programs to provide information, as part of the emergency public health response to bioterrorism or other public health emergencies.

=== Subtitle D: Emergency Authorities; Additional Provisions ===
Subtitle D affords flexibility regarding procedures in emergency situations. It provides extensions for certain reporting deadlines during a public health emergency and expands the authority of the Secretary, in consultation with the Surgeon General to specify communicable diseases that are subject to individual detention orders.

It amends title XI of the Social Security Act to add provisions with the purpose of ensuring that during an emergency, sufficient health care items and services are available to meet the needs of individuals on welfare, and health care providers furnishing such items and services in good faith, but that are unable to comply with one or more specified requirements may be reimbursed for such items and services and exempted from sanctions for noncompliance.

=== Subtitle E: Additional Provisions ===
Subtitle E includes several provisions.

It amends the Robert T. Stafford Disaster Relief and Emergency Assistance Act to require information to be efficiently distributed to the public.

The Secretary of Energy and the Administrator of the National Nuclear Security Administration is to expand research relevant to rapid detection and identification of pathogens likely to be used in a bioterrorism attack, and the Secretary, acting through the Director of the National Institute for Occupational Safety and Health, is to expand research on the health and safety of workers who are at risk for bioterrorism threats.

The Secretary of Veterans Affairs is to enhance the readiness of VA medical centers to protect patients and staff from chemical or biological attack or to respond to an attack.

The Community Access to Emergency Defibrillation Act of 2002 directs the Secretary to award grants to States, political subdivisions of States, Indian tribes, and tribal organizations to develop and implement public access defibrillation programs. Authorizes appropriations.

== Title II: Enhancing Controls on Dangerous Biological Agents and Toxins ==
Title II deals with the security of dangerous biological agents and toxins used in research and development.

=== Subtitle A: Department of Health and Human Services ===
Subtitle A amends the Public Health Service Act to enhance control of certain biological agents and toxins (select agents). DHHS is to establish and maintain a list of agents that may pose a threat to public health and safety, provide regulation of transfers, provide for enforcement of standards for their possession and use, require registration of their possession, use, and transfer, and creates security requirements for people possessing select agents commensurate with the risk the agent poses to public health and safety, and authorizes DHHS to inspect for compliance with regulations. All people in possession of select agents are to notify DHHS of possession.

It authorizes exemptions for clinical or diagnostic laboratories and other institutions who possess select agents that are contained in specimens for diagnosis, verification, or proficiency testing, provided that the identification of such agents is reported to DHHS and other authorities, and such agents or toxins are transferred or destroyed in a safe manner set forth by regulation. It authorizes exemptions for products that contain select agents and are cleared, unless DHHS determines that applying additional regulation to a specific product is necessary. It authorizes exemptions for an investigational product that contains a select agent when the product is being used in an investigation authorized under any federal act and the DHHS determines that applying additional regulation to such product is not necessary.

=== Subtitle B: Department of Agriculture ===
The Agricultural Bioterrorism Protection Act of 2002 directs the Secretary of Agriculture to establish and maintain a list of select agents that the Secretary determines has the potential to pose a threat to animal or plant health. Regulations should be established for transfers, registration and maintenance of a database of listed toxins, and security of persons possessing select agents. It requires information on registered persons to be submitted to the attorney general to determine if they are within any restricted categories. It requires prompt notification of the Secretary and law enforcement agencies of the theft or loss of listed agents and toxins.

A "restricted person" is a person who fits any of the following criteria:

- is under indictment for a crime punishable by imprisonment for a term exceeding 1 year
- has been convicted in any court of a crime punishable by imprisonment for a term exceeding 1 year
- is a fugitive from justice
- is an unlawful user of any controlled substance (as defined in section 102 of the Controlled Substances Act (21 U.S.C. 802))
- is an alien illegally or unlawfully in the United States
- has been adjudicated as a mental defective or has been committed to any mental institution
- is an alien who is a national of Cuba, Iran, Iraq, Libya, North Korea, Sudan or Syria, or any other country to which the Secretary of State has made a determination that such country has provided support for acts of international terrorism
- has been discharged from the Armed Services of the United States under dishonorable conditions

As in Subtitle A, there are exemptions for clinical and diagnostic laboratories, products, investigational use, agricultural emergencies, and public health emergencies.

It sets forth rules governing disclosure of information, penalties for violators, and reporting requirements.

=== Subtitle C: Interagency Coordination Regarding Overlap Agents and Toxins ===
This states that the Secretary of Agriculture and the Secretary of Health and Human Services are to coordinate activities regarding overlapping agents and toxins.

=== Subtitle D: Criminal Penalties Regarding Certain Biological Agents and Toxins ===
It amends federal criminal code provisions concerning possession of listed biological agents and toxins to provide that whoever knowingly transfers a select agent to a person they believe is not registered, or knowingly possesses a select agent for which a person has not obtained the required registration shall be fined, or imprisoned for not more than five years, or both.

== Title III: Protecting Safety and Security of Food and Drug Supply ==
Title III details the methods of protection of the nation's food supply against contamination or other threats.

=== Subtitle A: Protection of Food Supply ===
The President's Council on Food Safety, with the Secretary of Transportation, the Secretary of the Treasury, other relevant federal agencies, the food industry, and scientific organizations, develop a communication and education strategy with respect to bioterrorism threats to the food supply.

It amends the FFDCA to direct the DHHS to give high priority to increasing the number of inspections to enable the inspection of imported food with the greatest priority given to inspections to detect the intentional adulteration of food, to give high priority to making improvements to the information management systems of the FDA for information related to imported food, to improve cooperation with other regulatory agencies that share responsibility for food safety, and to provide for research into the development of methods to test food to rapidly detect adulteration.

It permits an employee of the FDA to detain any food that is found during an inspection, if the employee has information that it presents a threat of serious adverse health consequences or death, but only if the Secretary or an official designated by the Secretary approves the order.

It requires that any facility engaged in manufacturing, processing, packing, or holding food for consumption in the US be registered with the Secretary, and allows for the debarment of importers with a history of repeated or serious food import violations.

Permits the Secretary, if the Secretary has a reasonable belief that an article of food is adulterated and presents a threat of serious health consequences or death to humans or animals, to have access to and copy all records that are needed to assist the Secretary in determining whether the food is adulterated and presents a threat. It requires the Secretary, if they have information that a shipment of imported food presents a threat of serious adverse health consequences or death to humans or animals, to provide notice regarding such threat to the appropriate States.

It requires food importers to give the Secretary prior notice of the importation of any food for the purpose of enabling the food to be inspected.

It permits the Secretary to require the owner or consignee of food refused admission into the United States, but not ordered destroyed, to affix to the container of the food a label that clearly and conspicuously bears the statement: UNITED STATES: REFUSED ENTRY, and it prohibits an importer from port shopping with respect to food that has previously been denied entry.

It directs the Secretary of HHS and the Secretary of Agriculture to coordinate the surveillance of zoonotic diseases.

It authorizes the Secretary to commission employees of other federal departments or agencies, pursuant to a memorandum of understanding between the Secretary and the head of the other department or agency to conduct examinations and inspections for the Secretary under the FFDCA.

=== Subtitle B: Protection of Drug Supply ===
It amends the FFDCA to mandate electronic annual registration of foreign manufacturers and importers of drug and device products into United States.

It mandates a chain of custody for those entities that seek to import components of drugs, devices, food additives, color additives, or dietary supplements for further processing and export, and requires certificates of analysis for components containing any chemical substance or biological substance intended for export.

=== Subtitle C: General Provisions Relating to Upgrade of Agricultural Security ===
It authorizes the Secretary of Agriculture to utilize existing authorities to give high priority to expanding the capacity of the Animal and Plant Health Inspection Service to conduct inspections and allows for automated record keeping.

It authorizes the Secretary to utilize existing authorities to give high priority to expanding the capacity of the Food Safety Inspection Service to conduct inspections, and authorizes appropriations for enabling the Agricultural Research Service to upgrade buildings and modernize existing facilities.

It provides grants to universities with programs in food and agricultural sciences to review security standards and practices at their facilities in order to protect against bioterrorism.

It authorizes the Secretary to use existing research programs to protect the food supply of the United States by conducting and supporting research specified bioterrorism agricultural research and development activities.

== Title IV: Drinking Water Security and Safety ==
Title IV amends the Safe Drinking Water Act to require community water systems serving a population of more than 3,300 to conduct an assessment of the vulnerability of its system to a terrorist attack, to certify and submit a written copy of the assessment, and to prepare an emergency response plan. It requires the review of current and future methods to prepare to respond to the intentional introduction of contaminants into community water systems.

It requires the review of methods and means by which terrorists or other individuals or groups could disrupt the supply of safe drinking water or take other actions which could render drinking water significantly less safe for human consumption, and increases penalties under the Safe Drinking Water Act for tampering with drinking water systems and authorizes appropriations.

== Title V: Additional Provisions ==
Title V contains miscellaneous provisions, including a measure unrelated to public health and safety, in which the FCC is to direct the conversion to digital television.

=== Subtitle A: Prescription Drug User Fees ===
The Prescription Drug User Fee Amendments of 2002 amends the Federal Food, Drug, and Cosmetic Act to revise provisions concerning definitions and the authority to assess and use drug fees.

It provides public accountability for goals in the process for the review of human drug applications.

It revises provisions concerning reports of postmarketing studies.

=== Subtitle B: Funding Provisions Regarding Food and Drug Administration ===
It reserves specified amounts for the Office of Drug Safety from amounts appropriated to the Food and Drug Administration, and authorizes appropriations for the Division of Drug Marketing, Advertising, and Communications, and the Office of Generic Drugs.

=== Subtitle C: Additional Provisions ===
It directs the Federal Communications Commission to promote the orderly transition to digital television.
