= IPCS =

IPCS (or ipcs) can refer to:

- The Institute of Postcolonial Studies, an independent educational and research institution in Melbourne
- Institution of Professional Civil Servants, a former British trade union
- International Programme on Chemical Safety, a United Nations organization
- ipcs, a UNIX command
- Interactive Problem Control System, a dump-reading facility in OS/360 and successors
- The International Playing-Card Society

== See also ==
- IPC (disambiguation)
