= IPC =

IPC may refer to:

== Businesses and organizations ==
=== Arts and media ===
- Intellectual Property Committee, a coalition of US corporations with intellectual property interests
- International Panorama Council, an international network of specialists in the field of panoramas
- International Publishing Company, a former name of TI Media
  - IPC Media, another former name of TI Media

=== Educational ===
- Instituto Politécnico de Coimbra or Polytechnical Institute of Coimbra, Portugal
- International Pacific College, Palmerston North, New Zealand
- International People's College, Denmark

=== Governmental and political ===
- Information and Privacy Commissioner of Ontario, an officer of the Legislative Assembly of Ontario in Canada
- Immigration Policy Center, of the American Immigration Council
- Imperial Privy Council, another name for the Privy Council of the United Kingdom
- Integrated Food Security Phase Classification, a famine early-warning system supported by multiple governments.
- Iran Policy Committee, Washington-based pressure group concerned with US policy on Iran

=== Healthcare ===
- IPC Healthcare, United States
- Institute Pasteur du Cambodge, Cambodia

=== Religious ===
- Indian Pentecostal Church of God, India
- International Presbyterian Church

=== Other businesses and organizations ===
- IPC (electronics), an international trade association for the printed-board and electronics assembly industries
- IPC Systems, a firm providing communication systems for financial markets
- Idaho Power Company, an American utility
- International Paralympic Committee, an international non-profit organisation of elite sports for athletes with disabilities
- International Pepper Community, an intergovernmental commodity organization
- International Post Corporation, the International Post Corporation (IPC)
- Iraq Petroleum Company

== Computing ==
- Industrial PC, a PC-based computing platform for industrial applications
- Infrastructure protection centre or information security operations center
- Instructions per cycle or instructions per clock, an aspect of central-processing performance
- Inter-process communication, the sharing of data across multiple and commonly specialized processes
- International Planning Competition, the comparing of automated planning and scheduling software
- IP camera

== Finance ==
- Índice de Precios al Consumidor, a Chilean consumer price index
- Índice de Precios y Cotizaciones, an index of the Mexican Stock Exchange

== Other uses ==
- Infection Prevention and Control
- Indian Penal Code
- Insulation-piercing connector
- International Patent Classification, a classification system
- Integrated pest control, a discipline for combining biological and other pest management strategies
- Mataveri International Airport's IATA code
- International Plumbing Code
- Investigatory Powers Commissioner
- IPCTV, a defunct Japanese television channel serving the Brazilian community in Japan
- Interastral Peace Corporation, a company in the video game Honkai Star Rail
- International Pepper Community
- The isopinocampheyl unit, as in diisopinocampheylborane
