= NPRT =

NPRT is an acronym that may refer to:

- National pharmacy response team
- Nauru Phosphate Royalties Trust
- National Pacific Radio Trust, a trust which owns and operates the Pacific Media Network
