= TeamHealth =

American hospital staffing firm

- Type: Private
- Industry: Healthcare
- Founded: 1979; 47 years ago
- Founder: Lynn Massingale
- Headquarters: Knoxville, Tennessee, United States
- Key people: Leif Murphy; (CEO); Jody Crane (CMO); Lynn Massingale (Founder and Chairman)
- Number of employees: 18,000
- Website: teamhealth.com

TeamHealth is a physician-led practice of 18,000 clinicians and operational leaders serving hospitals and post-acute care facilities, and provides care to nearly 30 million patients annually. Founded in 1979 and based in Knoxville, Tennessee, TeamHealth, originally a provider of emergency department services, is outsourcing physicians in emergency medicine, hospital medicine, anesthesiology, critical care, obstetrics, orthopedic hospitalists, acute care surgery, and post-acute care and medical call centers to approximately 2,400 acute and post-acute facilities nationwide. After numerous acquisitions in the 2010s, it has become the largest market share in U.S. physician outsourcing. TeamHealth has affiliated partner companies, including D&Y Locum Tenens, Spectrum Healthcare Resources, and AccessNurse.

== History ==
TeamHealth was founded in Knoxville in 1979 by Dr. Lynn Massingale. The company began as Southeastern Emergency Physicians, the predecessor to TeamHealth, when Massingale, then an emergency medicine physician at the University of Tennessee Medical Center, earned the staffing contract in the emergency department at the medical center. Dr. Randal Dabbs, co-founder, began working with Southeastern Emergency Physicians and became a full partner in 1981.

In 1983, Dr. John Staley, co-founder, formed Emergency Coverage Corporation, a competitor to Southeastern Emergency Physicians. In 1986, the two companies merged. Over the years, other physicians, Dr. Gar LaSalle, Dr. James Rybak and Dr. Jim George, and their clinical groups joined TeamHealth and are now considered founders of the company.

During the 1990s the company was acquired by MedPartners. MedPartners grew the company to over $700 million in revenue during its ownership. In 1999, MedPartners sold the company to private equity firm Madison Dearborn Partners for $335 million but retained a 7.3% stake in the company.

As of 2026, TeamHealth has contracted with more than 18,000 health professionals and has handled more than 29 million patients each year. Leif M. Murphy is the chief executive officer as of 2016.

== Disaster Response ==
In 2012, following Hurricane Sandy, TeamHealth clinicians serving with the Tennessee Disaster Medical Assistance Team (DMAT) provided emergency medical care to displaced residents at shelters in New Brunswick and Atlantic City, New Jersey.

In 2017, TeamHealth’s clinician recovery team responded to several natural disasters and crisis situations, including Hurricane Harvey in Houston; Hurricane Irma in Florida; the Route 91 Harvest music festival mass shooting in Las Vegas; the Atlas Peak wildfire in northern California; and Hurricane Maria in Puerto Rico. In each situation, TeamHealth’s clinicians helped local hospitals manage capacity as they were overcrowded with patients.

According to the company, TeamHealth clinicians are on the frontlines of the COVID-19 pandemic. In April 2020, an image of two married TeamHealth nurse anesthetists embracing in complete personal protective equipment (PPE) at Tampa General Hospital went viral amid the early spread of the COVID-19 pandemic.

TeamHealth developed and implemented COVID-19 safety protocols nationwide. In November 2020, TeamHealth deployed more than two dozen clinicians to help hospitals and health clinics in El Paso, Texas, as they struggled to manage a massive outbreak of COVID-19.

In September 2024, TeamHealth clinicians responded to patient care needs following Hurricane Helene, including in parts of Western North Carolina where infrastructure disruptions limited access to power, water, and communications. The company reported that it deployed additional emergency medicine and hospital medicine clinicians to support affected hospitals and treated more than 500 patients during the response. Medical director Dr. Matt Riester described the response, stating that some emergency department staff "didn't leave the hospital for days" following the storm.

In January 2025, the company launched “TeamHealth Serves,” an internal initiative focused on employee volunteerism.

In 2026, TeamHealth clinician Nadine McGraw highlighted the role of rural hospitals in providing emergency care and cited workforce shortages, hospital closures, and financial pressures as challenges facing rural healthcare systems.

== Payer Disputes and Litigation ==
=== Surprise Billing ===
In September 2019, the NYT revealed that Team Health was one of two companies behind a political action group called "Doctor Patient Unity". The PAC had surfaced in July 2019 and spent more than $28 million in advertising opposing legislation to end out-of-network charges ("surprise medical bills" after emergency room visits). Because it did not disclose staff nor funders it has been referred to as a dark money group.

In October 2019, TeamHealth CEO Leif Murphy reaffirmed the company’s long-standing policy against balance billing patients and urged Congress to pass a legislative solution to end surprise medical billing that allowed health insurers and providers to work out billing disputes through an independent dispute resolution system.

In November 2019, NPR revealed a billing practice of TeamHealth's of suing poor and unfunded patients. According to a November 2019 letter from CEO Leif Murphy, TeamHealth eliminated the practice of pursuing unpaid bills in court and instituted a proactive discount policy that lowers costs for qualifying patients up to 90 to 100 percent.

In December 2020, TeamHealth CEO Leif Murphy issued the following statement supporting the No Surprises Act, “We fully support the No Surprises Act, as it is unequivocally the right thing for patients by placing the obligation for fair payment for emergency services on the insurer and keeping the patient out of the middle of any payment dispute.”

In 2023, TeamHealth stated that it prevailed in over 90 percent of disputes submitted through the federal independent dispute resolution (IDR) process established by the No Surprises Act. The company criticized what it characterized as insurer abuse of the No Surprises Act and stated that it used the arbitration process to resolve disputes involving what it described as insurer underpayment of claims.

In February 2026, Robert R. Frantz, president of TeamHealth's West Group, testified before the Oklahoma House Insurance Committee in support of House Bill 4460, a measure concerning insurer payment obligations for healthcare services. The legislation would require insurers to pay the full allowed amount for covered services regardless of a patient's cost-sharing status, with insurers responsible for collecting copayments, deductibles, and co-insurance.

In April 2026, Eric Norman, TeamHealth's head of human resources, reiterated the company's opposition to surprise billing and argued that some insurers were financially benefiting from provisions of the No Surprises Act while offering reimbursement rates below historical contracted rates.

In June 2026, TeamHealth chief medical officer Jody Crane welcomed federal regulatory changes to the No Surprises Act's independent dispute resolution process, stating that the reforms would make arbitration more accessible and transparent by reducing administrative fees and simplifying claim submissions.

==== Reimbursement Disputes ====
In August 2019, Moody's downgraded TeamHealth's bond rating to B3-CFR and B3-PD probability of default citing its dispute with its largest payor source, United Healthcare. United Healthcare alleged that TeamHealth was responsible for egregious billing for services rendered in emergency rooms across the country and announced "it will terminate approximately two-thirds of its in-network contracts with Team Health between October 15, 2019 until July 1, 2020. The company also said that UnitedHealth had significantly reduced its payments to Team Health for out-of-network services."

In August 2019, a Qui Tam lawsuit was filed on behalf of the US Government alleging systemic billing fraud involving Federal and State payor systems. Following a two-year investigation, the government declined to intervene in the case. The suit was settled and TeamHealth made no admission of wrongdoing.

In June 2020, a district court in Nevada ruled that a lawsuit filed by TeamHealth against United Healthcare could proceed. TeamHealth alleged that United breached its contracts by underpaying claims and worked with Data ISight to artificially reduce payment rates.

TeamHealth affiliates have filed lawsuits against insurers in an attempt to recover underpayments to emergency department physicians. According to the company, these lawsuits are intended to require insurers to uphold their financial commitment to their customers and avoid placing the patient in the middle of a reimbursement dispute between the emergency room providers and the insurance companies.

In July 2020, a jury in the federal court for the Eastern District of Arkansas ruled that a Centene health plan had underpaid Southeastern Emergency Physicians, a TeamHealth affiliate, and awarded $9.4 million in damages. The six-person jury found that Centene and its subsidiaries breached their contract with the TeamHealth affiliate by underpaying the emergency room claims and delaying their reimbursement.

In June 2021, a Texas jury awarded TeamHealth physicians $19.1 million in damages after finding that Molina Healthcare had refused to pay frontline emergency room doctors. The jury agreed on all counts that Molina Healthcare “engaged in unfair and deceptive practices.”

== Litigation against UnitedHealthcare ==
In October 2021, TeamHealth began a trial against UnitedHealthcare in the 8th District Court of Clark County, Nevada. TeamHealth alleges that the insurer underpaid claims made by three Nevada-based affiliates by as much as $10.5 million for emergency department care.

According to a statement from the company, “TeamHealth’s case will prove that United was orchestrating this [underpayments] scheme at the expense of frontline healthcare providers and their patients amid a devastating pandemic. Attorneys found that in many cases United was being paid more to process or adjudicate the patient’s claim than the front-line clinicians who provided the emergency care. Compromising the quality of emergency medical care in a natural disaster, a mass casualty event, or in any community is a risk no one can afford. This is why TeamHealth is standing up against United.”

On November 29, 2021, after more than three weeks of testimony and two days of deliberation, the Clark County, Nevada jury found unanimously in favor of TeamHealth that UnitedHealthcare engaged in unfair reimbursement practices by deliberately failing to pay frontline emergency room doctors adequately for care provided to patients.

The jury awarded TeamHealth $2.65 million in compensatory damages after finding UnitedHealthcare "guilty of oppression, fraud, and malice" by clear and convincing evidence. In a separate punitive damages phase, the jury unanimously awarded the provider group $60 million in punitive damages in addition to the compensatory award.

In a statement, TeamHealth President & CEO Leif Murphy stated that the company “look[s] forward to continuing the fight against United in nine future cases that will be decided on the same set of facts.” TeamHealth has similar cases pending against United in New Jersey, Pennsylvania, New York, Florida, Oklahoma, and Texas.

In one instance discussed in Nevada court, United reimbursed only $254 for a gunshot wound treatment billed at $1,428, despite testimony from a former United executive calling the total price tag “reasonable” and "worth" the charge for saving a life.

Several days before opening statements began, United filed a lawsuit in Tennessee Federal District Court alleging that TeamHealth up-coded charges. However, courts have repeatedly dismissed these claims in other jurisdictions, including the 8th District Court in Nevada along with courts in Arkansas, Texas, Tennessee, Mississippi, and Georgia. According to a statement from TeamHealth, “This frivolous lawsuit is a calculated effort to divert attention away from the court case commencing Monday in Las Vegas.”

Unsealed documents revealed that United HealthCare provided the anonymous data for Yale University economist Zack Cooper’s 2016 study on surprise medical billing, and made editorial suggestions. The National Institute for Health Care Management, whose board of directors is composed of health insurance executives, also provided financial support for Cooper’s work.

The research, presented at the White House, the U.S. Department of Justice, the Federal Trade Commission, and elsewhere, was publicized as a rigorous academic research study. While the lawsuit revealed that the study's anonymous data was provided by United HealthCare, other studies replicated the results using data from other insurance companies. The study's conclusions were used to advance a formula that allows insurance companies to determine payments to out-of-network physicians.

The study was widely cited by both national media outlets and members of Congress and has since heavily impacted the Biden administration’s implementation of the “No Surprises Act.”

== Leadership ==
- Leif M. Murphy, chief executive officer
- Dr. Jody Crane, chief medical officer
- Michael Wiechart, president and chief operating officer
- Dr. Lynn Massingale, co-founder and chairman

== Awards and recognition ==
- In 2026, Forbes included TeamHealth on its list of America's Best Large Employers. The company was also recognized by Newsweek as one of America's Greatest Workplaces and by Becker's Hospital Review as a top workplace in healthcare.
- In 2025, Newsweek included TeamHealth in its lists of America's Greatest Workplaces, Greatest Workplaces in Healthcare, and Greatest Workplaces for Community, Culture and Belonging.
- In 2024, TeamHealth Chief Culture and Belonging Officer and Strategic Accounts Group President, Stan Thompson, received Modern Healthcare's Top Diversity Leaders.
- Co-founder and Chairman Lynn Massingale named 2018 Tennessee Health Care Hall of Fame Inductee.

== See also ==
- PeaceHealth
