= Post-Katrina Emergency Management Reform Act of 2006 =

US federal law

The Post-Katrina Emergency Management Reform Act of 2006 (120 Stat. 1394) is a federal law in the United States that reformed disaster preparedness and response, and the activities of the Federal Emergency Management Agency. It was passed after public dissatisfaction with the federal response to Hurricane Katrina in 2005. It was signed by President George W. Bush on October 4, 2006. Andrew Weis led the drafting of the legislation.
