= International Pepper Exchange =

Indian black pepper organization

The International Pepper Exchange is an organisation headquartered in Kochi, India, that deals with the International trade of black pepper. The exchange, established in 1997, has been described as the world's only International Pepper Exchange.

== See also ==
- International Pepper Community
