= FEMA Photo Library =

The FEMA Photo Library (now FEMA Media Library) was an online gallery of photos compiled by the Federal Emergency Management Agency (FEMA) of the United States, containing more than 49,000 disaster related photographs taken since 1980. The majority of the collection was of declared disasters and there were also photographs from significant public events that had occurred on or near the National Mall in Washington, D.C. Since August 30, 2005, 6,098 images had been added to the collection; Hurricane Katrina had the most photographs in the collection with around 3,000 images.

The photographs were of hurricanes, tornadoes, floods, typhoons, fires, avalanches, ice storms, blizzards, terrorist attacks, earthquakes, and the Space Shuttle Columbia disaster.

The subjects of the photographs in the collection:

- FEMA and other disaster workers (Urban Search and Rescue, Disaster Medical Assistance Teams, the National Guard, Red Cross, US Army Corps of Engineers, US Forest Service, Internal Revenue Service, and State disaster workers) searching for and/or helping disaster victims.
- Photographs of damage to private property and public infrastructure.
- Photographs of FEMA success stories where a modification to a building or house lessened the damage from a natural disaster.
- Photographs of training.
- Photographs of FEMA provided housing for displaced disaster victims.
- Photographs of elected or appointed officials surveying the disaster and providing support to disaster workers and victims.

These photographs are in the public domain and are not copyrighted, due to being works by the federal government. The collection is added to during declared disasters, and sometimes there are continuous additions over the course of several days.

== History ==
In March 2019, the FEMA website was redesigned and the majority of the 49,000 photos disappeared.
