= IPC Healthcare =

IPC Healthcare, Inc.
- Formerly: IPC The Hospitalist Company
- Company type: Public
- Traded as: Nasdaq: IPCM
- Founded: 1995; 30 years ago
- Headquarters: North Hollywood, United States
- Parent: TeamHealth

IPC Healthcare, Inc., previously known as IPC The Hospitalist Company, was a publicly traded corporation which operates a national physician group practice focused on the delivery of hospital medicine and related facility-based services. IPC providers manage the care of patients in coordination with primary care physicians and specialists in over 1,900 facilities in 28 states across the U.S. The company name is derived from an earlier company called In-Patient Consultants Management, Inc. and the NASDAQ ticker name was changed to IPCM in 2008. The company changed its name to IPC Healthcare in January 2015. The company was acquired by TeamHealth in 2015 for $1.6 billion.

Adam Dean Singer (born in Los Angeles on April 20, 1960) has been director, Chairman, and Chief Executive Officer of IPC since he founded the company in 1995, and in 2006, was designated as the Chief Medical Officer. In 1991, Singer acquired a private practice in pulmonary medicine that shortly thereafter merged with two other pulmonary physicians to become part of Consultants For Lung Disease, Inc.

== Controversy ==
The company disclosed that on June 7, 2010, it received a civil investigative demand (CID) issued by the Department of Justice (DOJ), U.S. Attorney's Office for the Northern District of Illinois. The CID requested information concerning claims that IPC had submitted to Medicare and Medicaid.

In 2011, the company was the subject of an investigative report looking at the use of hospitalists in San Antonio area hospitals and at the death of a patient under an IPC physician's care. A 2013 article published by JAMA raised concerns about the quality of care provided by hospitalists with excessive workloads.

In 2013, the US Justice Department joined a "whistleblower" lawsuit against IPC, alleging that IPC physicians sought payment for higher and more expensive levels of medical service than were actually performed – a practice commonly referred to as "upcoding". Specifically, the lawsuit alleges that IPC encouraged its physicians to bill at the highest levels regardless of the level of service provided, trained physicians to use higher level codes and encouraged physicians with lower billing levels to "catch up" to their peers. Class action lawsuits against the company for overbilling are now being contemplated by various law firms specializing in such claims.

In February 2014, the former Attorney General of the State of Louisiana announced an investigation into whether IPC officers and/or directors breached their fiduciary duties to IPC's shareholders or otherwise violated state or federal laws. In June 2014, the United States Justice Department filed a civil lawsuit against IPC alleging that it submitted false claims to federal health care programs in violation of the False Claims Act by knowingly engaging in systematic overbilling for hospital evaluation and management services billed to Medicare, Medicaid, and other federal health benefit programs.

In February 2017, the company paid $60 million settle the False Claims Act qui tam lawsuit in the Northern District of Illinois. The suit alleged that IPC encouraged and trained physicians in upcoding and utilized incentive compensation schemes linked to billing performance, which in some cases led to incentive compensation exceeding the physician's base salary.
