= Doctor Patient Unity =

- Purpose: oppose laws which would stop surprise billing in the US medical system and cutting pay and benefits for emergency room doctors and other medical workers
- Funding: private equity firms Blackstone (owner of TeamHealth) and KKR (owner of Envision Healthcare)

Doctor Patient Unity is corporate lobbying front group funded by private equity firm owned doctor staffing companies to oppose laws to stop surprise billing in the US medical system. The group is funded by Blackstone (owner of TeamHealth) and KKR (owner of Envision Healthcare) and has spent more than $57 million on advertisements opposing the legislation to restrict surprise billing, at the same time cutting pay and benefits for emergency room doctors and other medical workers. The primary aim of the group is to stop the House Energy and Commerce Committee's No Surprises Act (HR 3630) and the Senate Health, Education, Labor and Pensions Committee's Lower Health Care Costs Act (S 1895). The group's tactics include targeting specific lawmakers who are standing for reelection in 2020 including Sen. John Cornyn (R-Tex.), Rep. Dan Kildee (D-Mich.) and Sen. Marsha Blackburn (R-Tenn.) and fearmongering.
