= Federal Emergency Management Agency =

United States disaster response agency

Agency overview
- Formed: April 1, 1979; 47 years ago
- Jurisdiction: United States
- Headquarters: Washington, D.C., U.S.
- Motto: Helping people before, during, and after disasters
- Employees: 17,300+ (2025)
- Annual budget: $33.08 billion (2025)
- Agency executive: Cameron Hamilton, Administrator
- Parent department: U.S. Department of Homeland Security
- Website: www.fema.gov

The Federal Emergency Management Agency (FEMA, /ˈfiːmə/ FEE-mə) is an agency of the United States Department of Homeland Security (DHS), initially created under President Jimmy Carter by Presidential Reorganization Plan No. 3 of 1978 and implemented by two Executive Orders on April 1, 1979. The agency's primary purpose is to coordinate the response to a disaster that has occurred in the United States and that overwhelms the resources of local and state authorities. The governor of the state in which the disaster occurs must declare a state of emergency and formally request from the president that FEMA and the federal government respond to the disaster. The only exception to the state's gubernatorial declaration requirement occurs when an emergency or disaster takes place on federal property or affects a federal asset—for example, the 1995 bombing of the Alfred P. Murrah Federal Building in Oklahoma City, Oklahoma, or the 2003 Space Shuttle Columbia return-flight disaster.

While on-the-ground support of disaster recovery efforts is a major part of FEMA's charter, the agency also provides state and local governments with experts in specialized fields, funding for rebuilding efforts, and relief funds for infrastructure (re)development. It also helps individuals access low-interest disaster recovery loans, in conjunction with the Small Business Administration. In addition to this, FEMA provides funds for response personnel preparedness training throughout the United States and funds for non-federal entities to provide housing and services for migrants released from Department of Homeland Security custody.

== History ==
=== Prior to 1930s ===
A series of devastating fires struck the port city of Portsmouth, New Hampshire, early in the 19th century. The 7th U.S. Congress passed a measure in 1803 that provided relief for Portsmouth merchants by extending the time they had for remitting tariffs on imported goods. This is widely considered the first piece of legislation passed by the federal government that provided relief after a disaster.

Between 1803 and 1930, ad hoc legislation was passed more than 100 times for relief or compensation after a disaster. Examples include the waiving of duties and tariffs to the merchants of New York City after the great fire of New York in 1835. Similarly, after the collapse of the John T. Ford Theater in June 1893, the 54th Congress passed legislation compensating those who were injured.

=== Piecemeal approach (1930s–1960s) ===
After the start of the Great Depression in 1929, President Herbert Hoover had commissioned the Reconstruction Finance Corporation (RFC) in 1932. The purpose of the RFC was to lend money to banks and institutions to stimulate economic activity. The RFC was also responsible for dispensing federal dollars in the wake of a disaster. The RFC can be considered the first organized federal disaster response agency.

The Bureau of Public Roads was given authority in 1934 to finance the reconstruction of highways and roads after disasters. The Flood Control Act of 1944 also gave the U.S. Army Corps of Engineers authority over flood control and irrigation projects and it thenceforth played a major role in aiding recovery and reconstruction after flooding disasters.

=== Department of Housing and Urban Development (1973–1979) ===
Federal disaster relief and recovery was brought under the umbrella of the Department of Housing and Urban Development (HUD) in 1973 by Presidential Reorganization Plan No. 2 of 1973. At this time, the Federal Disaster Assistance Administration was created as an organizational unit within HUD, and it was this agency that would oversee disasters until its incorporation into FEMA in 1978.

Prior to implementation of Reorganization Plan No. 3 of 1978 by E.O. 12127 and E.O. 12148, many government agencies were still involved in disaster relief; in some cases, more than 100 separate agencies might be jockeying for control and jurisdiction of a disaster.

Over the years, Congress increasingly extended the range of covered categories for assistance, and several presidential executive orders did the same. By enacting these various forms of legislative direction, Congress established a category for annual budgetary amounts of assistance to victims of various types of hazards or disasters, it specified the qualifications, and then it established or delegated the responsibilities to various federal and non-federal agencies.

In time, this expanded array of agencies themselves underwent reorganization. One of the first such federal agencies was the Federal Civil Defense Administration, which operated as part of the Executive Office of the President (EOP). Functions to administer disaster relief were then given to the President himself, who delegated these to the federal Housing and Home Finance Administration. Subsequently, a new Office of Defense Mobilization was created. Then, the new Office of Defense and Civilian Mobilization, also managed by the EOP, and after that, the Office of Civil and Defense Mobilization, which renamed the former agency. Then, an Office of Civil Defense, under the Department of Defense (DoD); the Department of Health, Education and Welfare (HEW); the Department of Agriculture; the Office of Emergency Planning (OEmP); the Defense Civil Preparedness Agency (replacing the OCD in the DoD); the Department of Housing and Urban Development (HUD) and the General Services Administration (GSA) (upon termination of the OEmP).

These actions demonstrated that, during those years, responsibilities for the nation's disaster preparedness were complex and involved multifarious agencies; structures were determined by disparate legislative actions, motivated by policy and budgetary earmarking, and not by a single, unifying, comprehensive strategy to meet the nation's need for coherent disaster preparedness and response into the future. Then, in 1978 an effort was made to consolidate these functions, mandates, agencies and funding streams: FEMA was created to house civil defense and disaster preparedness under one roof. This was a very controversial decision.

=== FEMA as an independent agency (1979–2003) ===
The FEMA seal from 1981 to 2003

The FEMA flag from 1981 to 2003 and 2022-present

FEMA was established under the 1978 Reorganization Plan No. 3 and was activated by President Jimmy Carter in an Executive Order on April 1, 1979.

In July, Carter signed Executive Order 12148 shifting disaster relief efforts to the new federal-level agency. FEMA absorbed the Federal Insurance Administration, the National Fire Prevention and Control Administration, the National Weather Service Community Preparedness Program, the Federal Preparedness Agency of the General Services Administration and the Federal Disaster Assistance Administration activities from HUD. FEMA was also given the responsibility for overseeing the nation's Civil Defense, a function which had previously been performed by the Department of Defense's Defense Civil Preparedness Agency.

One of the disasters FEMA responded to was the dumping of toxic waste into Love Canal in Niagara Falls, New York, in the late 1970s. FEMA also responded to the Three Mile Island nuclear accident where the nuclear-generating station suffered a partial core meltdown. These disasters, while showing the agency could function properly, also uncovered some inefficiencies.

In 1993, President Bill Clinton appointed James Lee Witt as FEMA Director. In 1996, the agency was elevated to cabinet rank; this was not continued by President George W. Bush. Witt initiated reforms that would help to streamline the disaster recovery and mitigation process. The end of the Cold War also allowed the agency's resources to be turned away from civil defense to natural disaster preparedness.

After FEMA's creation through reorganization and executive orders, Congress continued to expand FEMA's authority by assigning responsibilities to it. Those responsibilities include dam safety under the National Dam Safety Program Act; disaster assistance under the Stafford Disaster Relief and Emergency Assistance Act; earthquake hazards reduction under the Earthquake Hazards Reduction Act of 1977 and further expanded by Executive Order 12699, regarding safety requirements for federal buildings and Executive Order 12941, concerning the need for cost estimates to seismically retrofit federal buildings; emergency food and shelter under the Stewart B. McKinney Homeless Assistance Act of 1987; hazardous materials, under the Emergency Planning and Community Right-to-Know Act.

In addition, FEMA received authority for counterterrorism through the Nunn-Lugar-Domenici amendment under the Weapons of Mass Destruction Act of 1996, which was a response to the recognized vulnerabilities of the U.S. after the sarin gas attack on the Tokyo subway in 1995.

Congress funded FEMA through a combination of regular appropriations and emergency funding in response to events.

=== FEMA under Department of Homeland Security (2003–present) ===
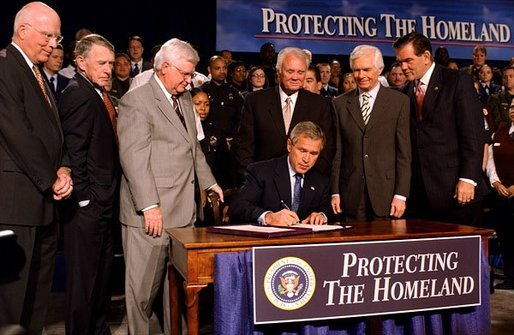
President George W. Bush signs the Homeland Security Appropriations Act of 2004.

Following the attacks of September 11, 2001, Congress passed the Homeland Security Act of 2002, which created the Department of Homeland Security (DHS) to better coordinate among the different federal agencies that deal with law enforcement, disaster preparedness and recovery, border protection and civil defense. FEMA was absorbed into DHS effective March 1, 2003. As a result, FEMA became part of the Emergency Preparedness and Response Directorate of the Department of Homeland Security, employing more than 2,600 full-time employees. It became Federal Emergency Management Agency again on March 31, 2007, but remained in DHS.

President Bush appointed Michael D. Brown as FEMA's director in January 2003. Brown warned in September 2003 that FEMA's absorption into DHS would make a mockery of FEMA's new motto, "A Nation Prepared", and would "fundamentally sever FEMA from its core functions", "shatter agency morale" and "break longstanding, effective and tested relationships with states and first responder stakeholders". The inevitable result of the reorganization of 2003, warned Brown, would be "an ineffective and uncoordinated response" to a terrorist attack or a natural disaster.

Hurricane Katrina in 2005 demonstrated that the vision of further unification of functions and another reorganization could not address the problems FEMA had previously faced. The "Final Report of the Select Bipartisan Committee to Investigate the Preparation for and Response to Hurricane Katrina", released February 15, 2006, by the U.S. Government Printing Office, revealed that federal funding to states for "all hazards" disaster preparedness needs was not awarded unless the local agencies made the purposes for the funding a "just terrorism" function. Emergency management professionals testified that funds for preparedness for natural hazards were given less priority than preparations for counter-terrorism measures. Testimony also expressed the opinion that the mission to mitigate vulnerability and prepare for natural hazard disasters before they occurred had been separated from disaster preparedness functions, making the nation more vulnerable to known hazards, like hurricanes.

After allegations of mismanagement during Hurricane Katrina, the National Disaster Medical System (NDMS) was transferred from the Department of Homeland Security to the Department of Health and Human Services by the Pandemic and All-Hazards Preparedness Act, signed by President George W. Bush on December 18, 2006. In the same year, congress passed the Post-Katrina Emergency Management Reform Act of 2006, which made FEMA a more independent agency within DHS, and better define its primary mission. The act also added a Surge Capacity Force, which allows the Department of Homeland Security to supplement FEMA employees with additional personnel from various federal departments in the event the agency is overwhelmed. The Force has been activated for Hurricane Sandy, Hurricane Harvey, Hurricane Irma, Hurricane Maria, and the 2017 California wildfires.

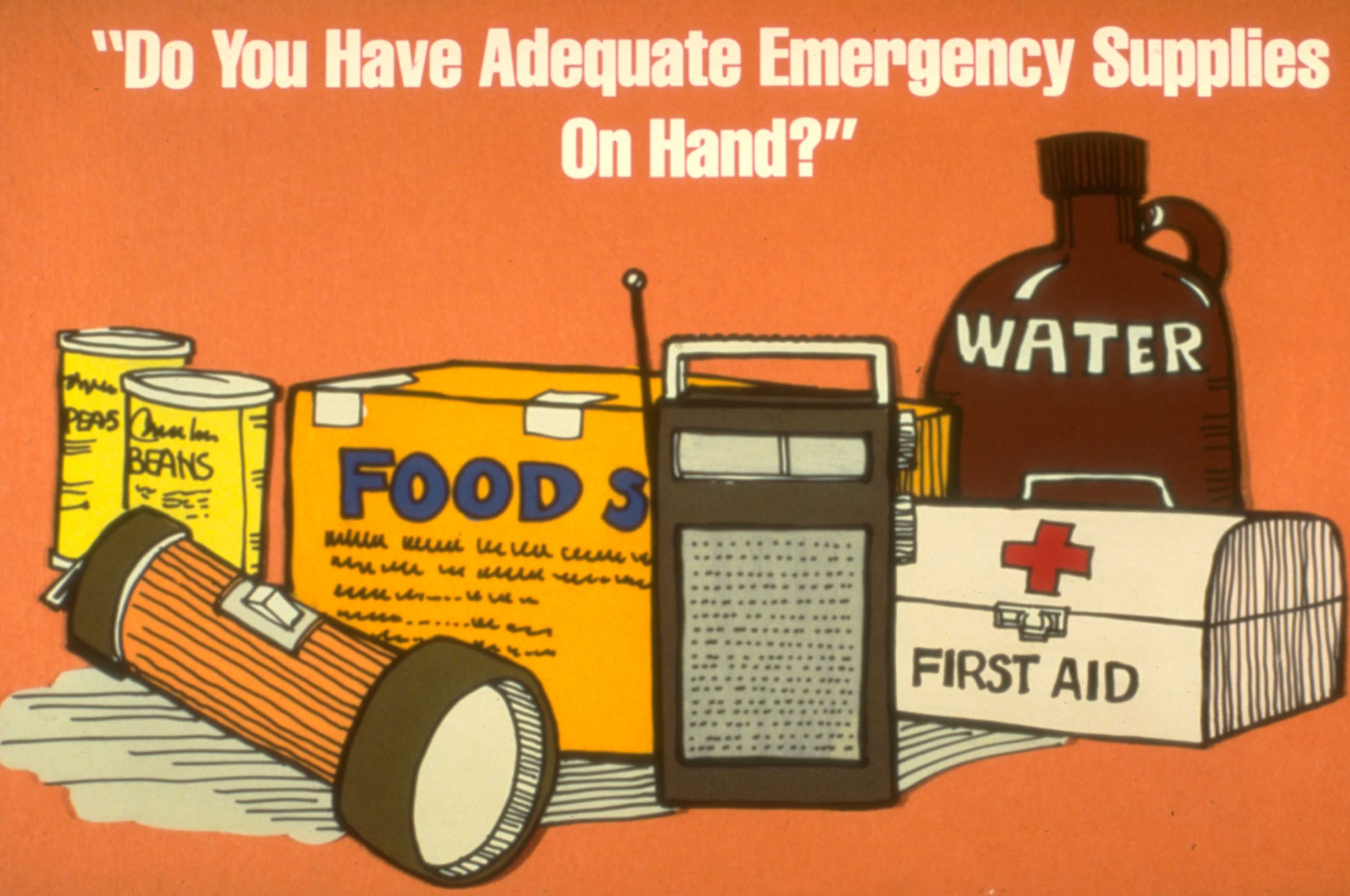

In fall 2008, FEMA took over coordination of the Ready Campaign, the national public service advertising campaign in collaboration with the Ad Council, to educate and empower Americans to prepare for and respond to emergencies including natural and man-made disasters. The Ready Campaign (and its Spanish-language version, Listo) asks individuals to do three things: build an emergency supply kit, make a family emergency plan, and be informed about the different types of emergencies that can occur and how to respond. The campaign messages have been promoted through television, radio, print, outdoor and web PSAs, as well as brochures, toll-free phone lines and English- and Spanish-language websites.

In 2013, as a response to FEMA's response to Hurricane Sandy, congress passed the Sandy Recovery Improvement Act of 2013, which amongst other things allowed federally recognized tribes to directly request a presidential declaration of emergency.

The Stafford Act was amended by the Pets Evacuation and Transportation Standards Act (PETS Act) in 2006, and the Disaster Recovery Reform Act (DRRA) in 2018. DRRA made efforts to focus FEMA effort on improving resiliency, preparedness, and mitigating vulnerabilities for large disasters.

FEMA was put in charge of procuring medical supplies during the COVID-19 pandemic.

According to a tweet posted on April 12, 2022, by Deanne Criswell, the FEMA flag, used between 1981 and 2003, was reintroduced.

=== FEMA under second Trump Administration (2025) ===
Historically, FEMA has operated in a nonpartisan manner, responding similarly to disaster funding requests from states, regardless of whether they are controlled by the Democratic Party or the Republican Party. However, under the second Donald Trump administration, FEMA only approved 23 percent of disaster funding requests from states with a Democratic governor and two Democratic senators, whereas it approved 89 percent of requests from Republican states. President Trump also takes a longer time to make a decision on requests from Democratic states. In his social media rhetoric, President Trump has been explicit about his partisanship regarding disaster funding requests.

The Trump administration has the stated goal of reducing or eliminating the federal role of FEMA, and having individual states assume emergency management responsibilities instead. In 2025, FEMA was subjected to cuts by the Trump administration, firing more than 200 new and veteran employees on February 17, 2025. On March 24, 2025, then Homeland Security Secretary Kristi Noem said she would move to eliminate FEMA.

In May 2025, the interim leader of FEMA, Cameron Hamilton, was dismissed from his position one day after he testified to Congress: "I do not believe it is in the best interest of the American people to eliminate the Federal Emergency Management Agency." He was replaced as interim FEMA leader by Marine Corps veteran David Richardson, who promptly told FEMA staff: "I alone in FEMA, speak for FEMA … Don't get in my way … because I will run right over you. I will achieve the president's intent."

In August 2025, more than 180 current and former FEMA employees signed an open letter, later called the "Katrina Declaration," which criticized recent policy changes under the Trump administration and warned they undermined the agency's ability to respond to disasters. The letter cited requirements for DHS approval of FEMA contracts, the reassignment of staff to immigration enforcement, cuts to preparedness programs, and the suppression of climate science. Following the letter, several current FEMA employees who signed by name were placed on paid administrative leave. FEMA stated the leave was not disciplinary, while critics and advocacy groups described it as retaliatory and raised concerns about political interference in FEMA operations.

Richardson, the acting FEMA administrator, resigned on November 17, 2025.

== Organization ==
=== Under DHS ===
Since March 2003, FEMA has been organized under Department of Homeland Security, though its relationship to DHS remained politically contentious. During congressional debate on the Homeland Security Act of 2002, some called for FEMA to remain as an independent agency. Following the failed response to Hurricane Katrina, critics called for FEMA to be removed from the Department of Homeland Security. Instead, the Post-Katrina Emergency Management Reform Act of 2006 (Public Law 109-295) affirmed FEMA's status as a permanent agency and consolidated the Department of Homeland Security Preparedness Directorate under FEMA as the Center for Domestic Preparedness. The Administrator for Federal Emergency Management reports directly to the Secretary of Homeland Security.

=== Internal Organization ===
FEMA comprises a central Office of the Administrator, ten regional offices (see regional map, below), a national FEMA Office of Response and Recovery, an Office of Resilience, and the U.S. Fire Administration.

Under the Office of the Administrator are the Office of External Affairs, Office of National Continuity Programs, Office of Policy and Program Analysis, and Office of Mission Support.

The Office of National Continuity Programs (formerly the National Continuity Programs Directorate and before that the Office of National Security Coordination (ONSC)) is responsible for developing, exercising, and validating agency-wide continuity of government plans as well as overseeing and maintaining continuity readiness including the Mount Weather Emergency Operations Center. ONSC also coordinated the continuing efforts of other Federal Executive Agencies.

FEMA's Federal Insurance and Mitigation Administration, a division of the Office of Resilience, manages the National Flood Insurance Program.

Under the Office of Resilience's Grant Programs Directorate, FEMA administers the Homeland Security Grant Program (HSGP) which provides funding to state governments, local governments, Tribal governments, and Territorial governments along with specified Urban Areas and counties along international borders to invest in security enhancements. HSGP is broken out into three primary grant programs: State Homeland Security Grant Program (SHSP), Urban Area Security Initiative (UASI), and Operation Stonegarden (OPSG). As of 2024, the Tribal Homeland Security Grant Program (THSGP) is funded as a percentage carveout of HSGP as well. The Nonprofit Security Grant Program (NSGP) used to be funded under the HSGP as well, but Congress now funds that program separately from HSGP. NSGP provides funding for nonprofit organizations at greater risk of terrorist action and domestic violent extremism, and enables investment in "target hardening". This includes, but is not limited to, organizations such as educational facilities, hospitals, and house of worship. In 2024, FEMA administered over $3 billion across the suite of homeland security grants.

=== Budget ===
In 2018, FEMA had an annual budget of $30 billion that is used and distributed in different states according to the emergencies that occur in each one. An annual list of the use of these funds is disclosed at the end of the year on FEMA's website.

=== Regions ===
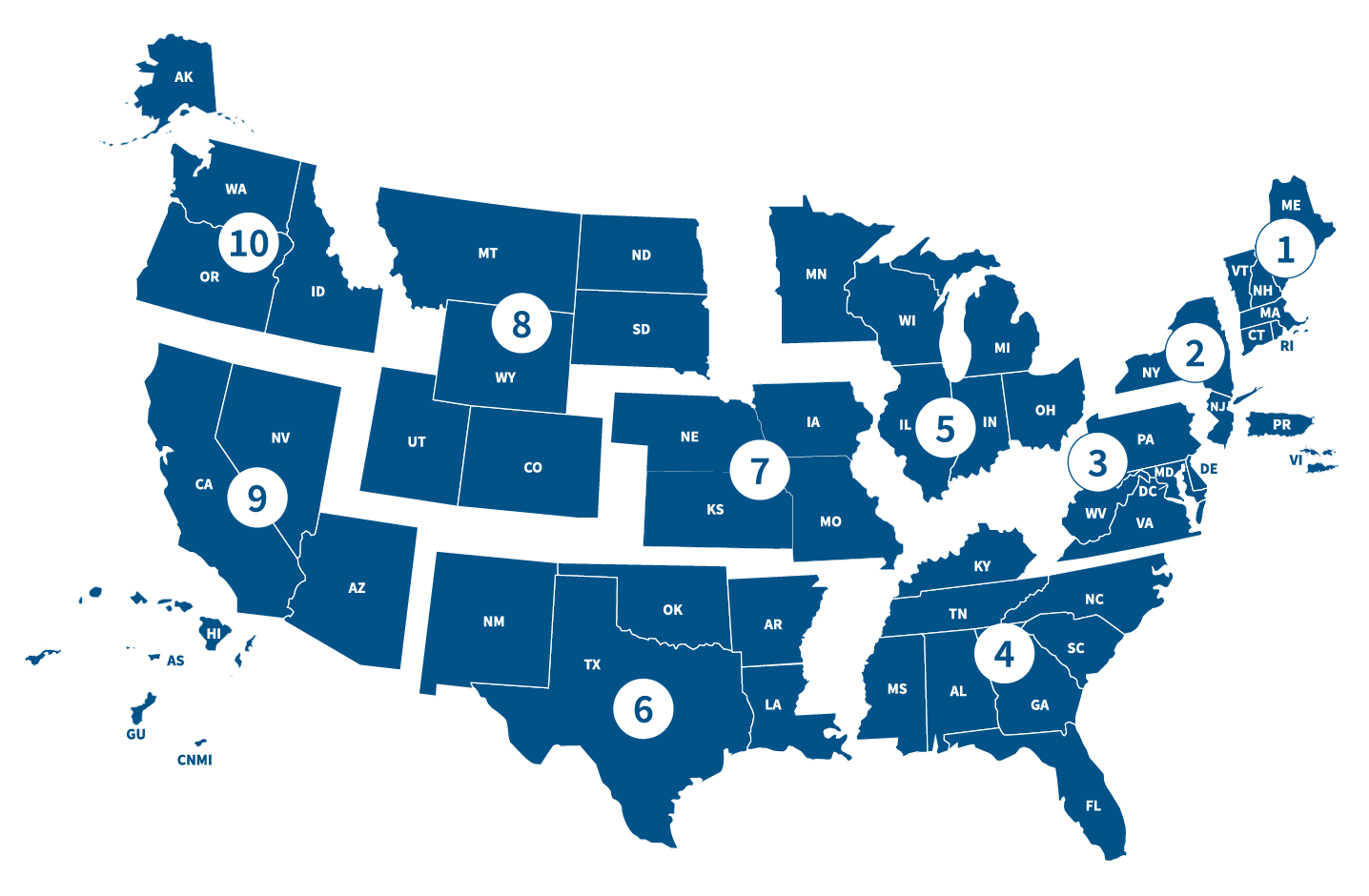
FEMA Regions map grouped by states and number

- Regional map
  - Region 1, Boston, MA – Serving CT, MA, ME, NH, RI, VT
  - Region 2, New York, NY Serving NJ, NY, PR, USVI
  - Region 3, Philadelphia, PA Serving DC, DE, MD, PA, VA, WV
  - Region 4, Atlanta, GA Serving AL, FL, GA, KY, MS, NC, SC, TN
  - Region 5, Chicago, IL Serving IL, IN, MI, MN, OH, WI
  - Region 6, Denton, TX Serving AR, LA, NM, OK, TX
  - Region 7, Kansas City, MO Serving IA, KS, MO, NE
  - Region 8, Denver, CO Serving CO, MT, ND, SD, UT, WY
  - Region 9, Oakland, CA Serving AZ, CA, HI, NV, GU, AS, CNMI, RMI, FM
  - Region 10, Bothell, WA Serving AK, ID, OR, WA

=== Cadres ===
FEMA maintains 23 cadres of various work functions and skillsets so as to prepare for, respond to, and recover from various disasters:

- Acquisitions (ACQ)
- Alternative Dispute Resolution (ADR)
- Civil Rights (CVR)
- Disability Integration (DI)
- Disaster Emergency Communications (DEC)
- Disaster Field Training Operations (DFTO)
- Disaster Survivor Assistance (DSA)
- Environmental/Historic Preservation (EHP)
- External Affairs (EA)
- Field Leadership (FL)
- Financial Management (FM)
- Hazard Mitigation (HM)
- Human Resources (HR)
- Individual Assistance (IA)
- Information Technology (IT)
- Interagency Recovery Coordination (IRC)
- Logistics (LOG)
- Office of Chief Counsel, Legal Affairs (OCC)
- Operations (OPS)
- Planning (PLAN)
- Public Assistance (PA)
- Safety (SAF)
- Security (SEC)

== Pre-disaster mitigation programs ==
FEMA's Mitigation Directorate is responsible for programs that take action before any disaster occurs, in order to identify risks and reduce injuries, loss of property, and recovery time. The agency has major analysis programs for floods, hurricanes and tropical storms, dams, and earthquakes.

The Hazard Mitigation Grant Program funds rebuilding after a current disaster in a way that reduces the impact of a similar future disaster.

FEMA works to ensure affordable flood insurance is available to homeowners in flood plains, through the National Flood Insurance Program, and also works to enforce no-build zones in known flood plains and relocate or elevate some at-risk structures.

Pre-Disaster Mitigation grants are available to acquire property for conversion to open space, retrofit existing buildings, construct tornado and storm shelters, manage vegetation for erosion and fire control, and establish small flood control projects. Critics say this program is underperforming because it is starved for funding compared to disaster response and recovery, the process of applying for a buyout is unreasonably slow, and is wasting taxpayer dollars because the National Flood Insurance Program has paid to reconstruct some properties up to 18 times. 1% of NFIP-insured properties are responsible for more than one quarter of the money the program has paid out.

In April 2026, FEMA announced funding of close to $21 million to Oregon and Washington for flood mitigation, as part of its over $250 million allocated towards flood mitigation projects countrywide.

== Response capabilities ==
NOAA's National Centers for Environmental Information (NCEI) has reported growing numbers of weather and climate-related events costing at least a billion dollars each, exceeding the 1980–2019 inflation-adjusted average of 6.6 such events.

FEMA's emergency response is based on small, decentralized teams trained in such areas as the National Disaster Medical System (NDMS), Urban Search and Rescue (USAR), Disaster Mortuary Operations Response Team (DMORT), Disaster Medical Assistance Team (DMAT), and Mobile Emergency Response Support (MERS).

=== National Response Coordination Center (NRCC) ===
FEMA's National Response Coordination Center (NRCC) is a multiagency center located at FEMA HQ that coordinates the overall Federal support for major disasters and emergencies, including catastrophic incidents in support of operations at the regional level. The FEMA Administrator, or their delegate, activates the NRCC in anticipation of, or in response to, an incident by activating the NRCC staff, which includes FEMA personnel, the appropriate Emergency Support Functions, and other appropriate personnel (including nongovernmental organization and private sector representatives). During the initial stages of a response, FEMA will, as part of the whole community, focus on projected, potential, or escalating critical incident activities. The NRCC coordinates with the affected region(s) and provides needed resources and policy guidance in support of incident-level operations. The NRCC staff specifically provides emergency management coordination, planning, resource deployment, and collects and disseminates incident information as it builds and maintains situational awareness—all at the national-level. FEMA maintains the NRCC as a functional component of the NOC for incident support operations.

An example of NRCC activity is the coordination of emergency management activities that took place in connection with the 2013 Colorado floods.

=== Disaster Medical Assistance Teams ===
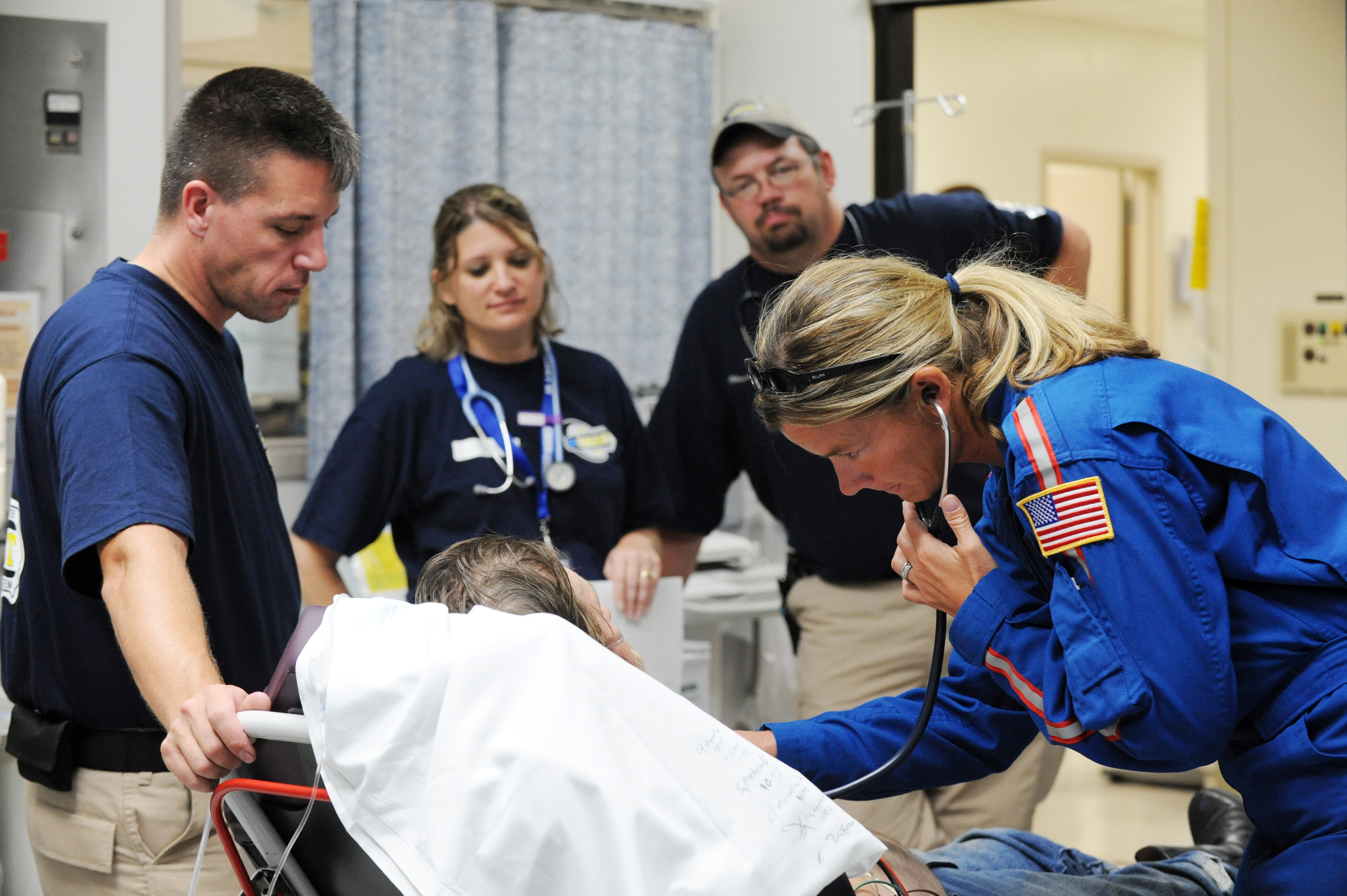
DMAT team deployed for Hurricane Ike in Texas

Disaster Medical Assistance Teams (DMAT) provide medical care at disasters and are typically made up of doctors and paramedics. There are also National Nursing Response Teams (NNRT), National Pharmacy Response Teams (NPRT) and Veterinary Medical Assistance Teams (VMAT). Disaster Mortuary Operational Response Teams (DMORT) provide mortuary and forensic services. National Medical Response Teams (NMRT) are equipped to decontaminate victims of chemical and biological agents.

=== Urban Search and Rescue (US&R) ===
The Urban Search and Rescue Task Forces perform rescue of victims from structural collapses, confined spaces, and other disasters, for example, mine collapses and earthquakes.

=== Mobile Emergency Response Support (MERS) ===
Presidential mobile phone alert for national emergencies

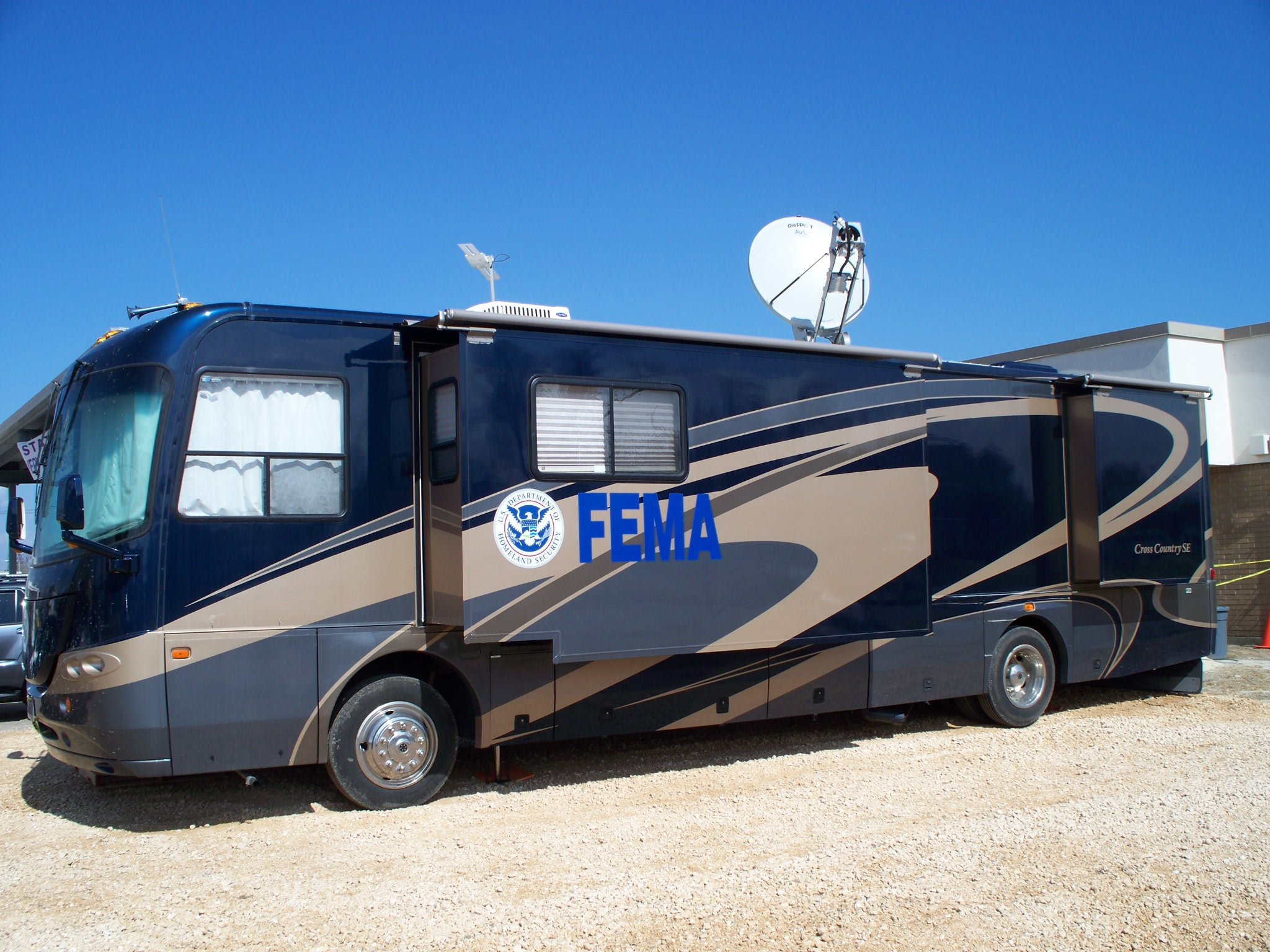
FEMA vehicle provides communications support after a major hurricane.

These teams provide communications support to local public safety. For instance, they may operate a truck with satellite uplink, computers, telephone, and power generation at a staging area near a disaster so that the responders can communicate with the outside world. There are also Mobile Air Transportable Telecommunications System (MATTS) assets which can be airlifted in. Also, portable cell phone towers can be erected to allow local responders to access telephone systems.

The first test of the national wireless emergency system by FEMA was broadcast to an estimated 225 million electronic devices at 14:18 EDT on October 3, 2018. The text message was accompanied by a flashing warning sign and warning tone. The president may direct FEMA to broadcast such alerts only for national emergencies or if the public is in danger. The facility may not be used for personal messages from the president. Mobile phone owners can not opt out of these warnings.

=== Preparedness for nuclear incidents ===
On August 1, 2008, FEMA released "Planning Guidance for Protection and Recovery Following Radiological Dispersal Device (RDD) and Improvised Nuclear Device (IND) incidents", which provide an action guide in the case of radioactive contamination. This guidance is specified as action guide for Radiological Dispersal Devices (RDD) and Improvised Nuclear Devices (IND) involving high levels of radiation. According to the Federation of American Scientists, during the Cold War FEMA prepared assessments of the likely consequences of a full-scale Soviet nuclear attack on the United States for use in planning mitigation and recovery efforts. FEMA also prepared plans for evacuating major U.S. cities in response to a nuclear war, dubbed CRP-2B.

=== Training ===
FEMA offers a large number of training classes, either at its own centers, through programs at the state level, in cooperation with colleges and universities, or online. The latter are free classes available to anyone, although only those with U.S. residency or work eligibility can take the final examinations. More information is available on the FEMA website under the "Emergency Personnel" and "Training" subheadings. Other emergency response information for citizens is also available at its website.

FEMA runs the Incident Workforce Academy, a two-week emergency preparedness training program for FEMA employees. The first class of the academy graduated in early 2014.

The Training and Education Division within FEMA's National Integration Center directly funds training for responders and provides guidance on training-related expenditures under FEMA's grant programs. Information on designing effective training for first responders is available from the Training and Education Division. Emergency managers and other interested members of the public can take independent study courses for certification at FEMA's online Emergency Management Institute.

==== Emergency Management Institute training and certifications ====
EMI offers credentials and training opportunities for United States Citizens. Note that students do not have to be employed by FEMA or be a federal employee for some of the programs. However, they do need to create a FEMA SID to take the final exams

EMI maintains a strategic partnership with Frederick Community College. FCC has contracted with the Emergency Management Institute to provide college credit for the Independent Study Program (ISP). FCC offers eight specialized Letters of Recognition, an Undergraduate Certificate, and an Associate of Applied Science degree in Emergency Management.

== FEMA Corps ==
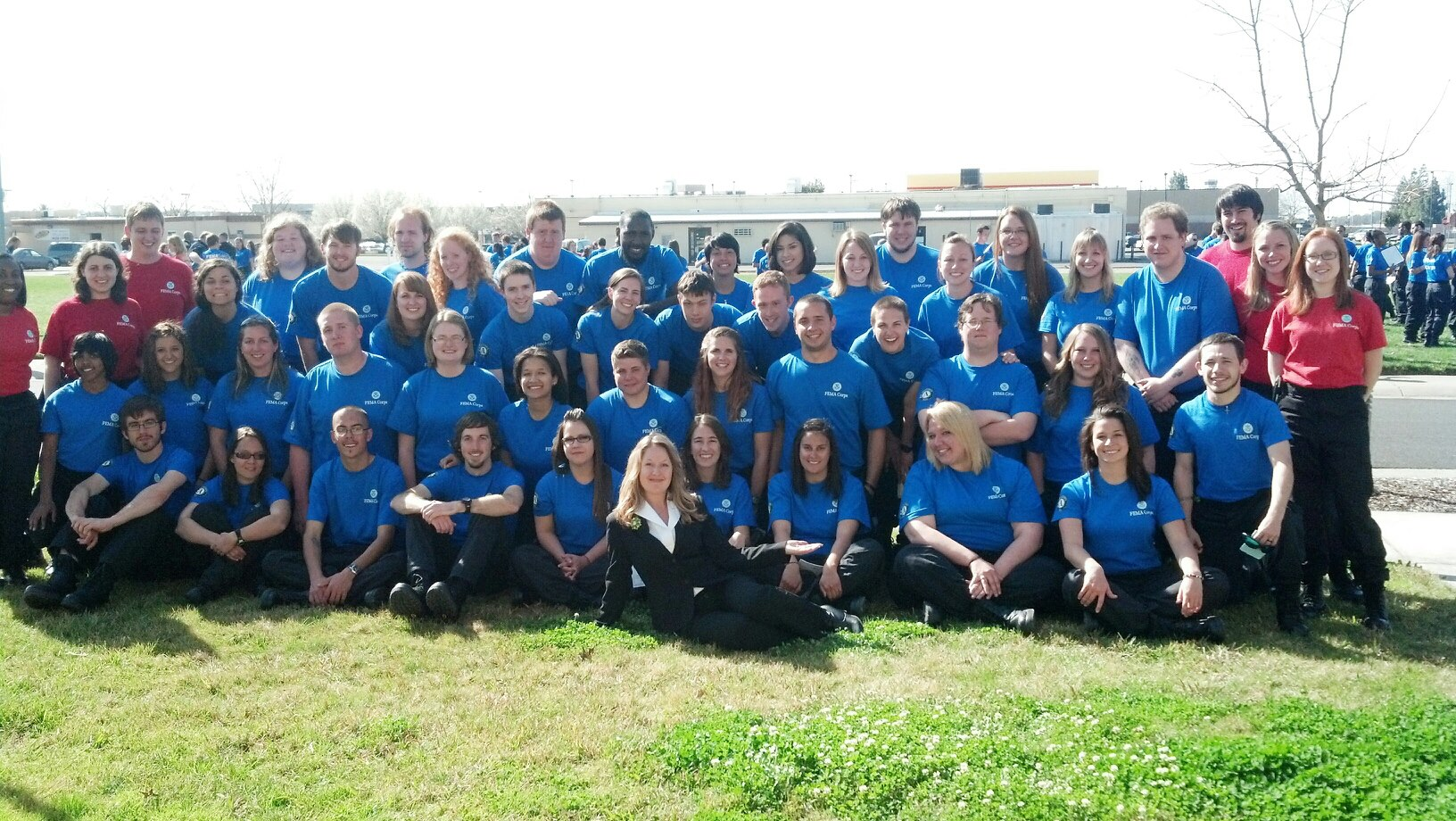
FEMA Corps Pacific Region Blue Unit

FEMA Corps, who range in age from 18 to 26 years old, is a cadre dedicated to disaster response and recovery. It is a new partnership between The Corporation for National and Community Service's AmeriCorps NCCC (National Civilian Community Corps) and FEMA. The Corps, described as a "dedicated, trained, and reliable disaster workforce", works full-time for 10 months on federal disaster response, recovery, mitigation, and preparedness efforts across numerous sections. Over 150 members of the inaugural FEMA Corps class graduated in June 2013, at the Southern Region AmeriCorps NCCC campus in Vicksburg, Mississippi. The Pacific Region campus in Sacramento, California and the Southern Region campus both support a FEMA Corps class annually. The Corps work in teams of 6 to 10 people and follow the traditional NCCC model of living together and traveling together. In addition to working with FEMA, Corps members must perform AmeriCorps responsibilities such as Physical Training three times a week, National Days of Service, and Individual Service Projects in communities throughout the United States. Members receive $6.10 a day for food ($15 a day when deployed to on disaster project) and a living stipend of approximately $3,500 over 10 months (Approximately $175 every two weeks). Team leaders receive a larger stipend of approximately $10,000 over the course of 10 months (Approximately $500 every two weeks). The Segal AmeriCorps education award is distributed to Corps members who successfully finish their term of service, completing 1,700 or more total hours. The amount of a full-time Segal AmeriCorps Education Award is equivalent to the maximum value of the Pell Grant for the fiscal year in which the term of national service is approved, and can therefore change between different classes.

== Donations management ==
FEMA has established a public-private partnership that has created a National Donations Management Program, making it easier for corporations or individuals not previously engaged to make offers of free assistance to States and the Federal Government in times of disaster. The program is a partnership among FEMA, relief agencies, corporations/corporate associations and participating state governments.

== Criticisms ==
=== Hurricane Andrew ===
In August 1992, Hurricane Andrew struck the Florida and Louisiana coasts with 165 mph (265 km/h) sustained winds. FEMA was widely criticized for its response to Andrew, summed up by the famous exclamation, "Where in the hell is the cavalry on this one?" by Kate Hale, emergency management director for Miami-Dade County, Florida. FEMA and the federal government at large were accused of not responding fast enough to house, feed and sustain the approximately 250,000 people left homeless in the affected areas. Within five days the federal government and neighboring states had dispatched 20,000 National Guard and active duty troops to South Dade County to set up temporary housing. This event and FEMA's performance was reviewed by the National Academy of Public Administration in its February 1993 report "Coping With Catastrophe" which identified several basic paradigms in Emergency Management and FEMA administration that were causes of the failed response.

FEMA had previously been criticized for its response to Hurricane Hugo, which hit South Carolina in September 1989, and many of the same issues that plagued the agency during Hurricane Andrew were also evident during the response to Hurricane Katrina in 2005.

Additionally, upon incorporation into DHS, FEMA was legally dissolved and a new Emergency Preparedness and Response Directorate was established in DHS to replace it. Following enactment of the Post-Katrina Emergency Management Reform Act of 2006 FEMA was reestablished as an entity within DHS, on March 31, 2007.

=== Southern Florida hurricanes ===
South Florida newspaper Sun-Sentinel has an extensive list of documented criticisms of FEMA during the four hurricanes that hit the region in 2004. Some of the criticisms include:

- When Hurricane Frances hit South Florida on Labor Day weekend (over 100 miles north of Miami-Dade County), 9,800 Miami-Dade applicants were approved by FEMA for $21 million in storm claims for new furniture; clothes; thousands of new televisions, microwaves and refrigerators; cars; dental bills; and a funeral even though the Medical Examiner recorded no deaths from Frances. A U.S. Senate committee and the inspector general of the Department of Homeland Security found that FEMA inappropriately declared Miami-Dade county a disaster area and then awarded millions, often without verifying storm damage or a need for assistance.
- FEMA used hurricane aid money to pay funeral expenses for at least 203 Floridians whose deaths were not caused by the 2004 hurricanes, the state's coroners have concluded. Ten of the people whose funerals were paid for were not in Florida at the time of their deaths.

The rising sea levels, global temperatures, and increase of flooding and severe storms has called for a change within the procedure of flood insurance. The communities that are directly impacted by these changes include coastal communities and waterfront homes. The procedural design of flood insurance is done through FEMA's (Federal Emergency Management Agency) National Flood Insurance Program. Previously the Insurance Program created in 1968 was constructed around the "100-year floodplain" which is the "area that would be inundated by the 100-year flood, better thought of as an area that has a one percent or greater chance of experiencing a flood in any single year", and large subsidies for coastal homes, especially in Florida. However, in 2019, major changes were made, and the new program called Risk Rating 2.0 was introduced, which prices a house on its individual flood risk. It will account for the distance one's house is from a flood source, the types and frequency of flooding, and characteristics of the cost to rebuild. This new program will greatly impact states like Florida that have intense risk of hurricanes and sea level rise. Through the initial program, the homes on the coast were mostly being subsidized at the cost of the homeowners more inland, and more likely lower-income and people of color. However, as previously stated, with Risk Rating 2.0, homeowners in higher risk areas of greater flooding will be paying for that risk through insurance, and with that may come with re-evaluating the longevity of one's place on the coasts of Florida. On the other hand, with FEMA's program as a national program, we see different impacts in places like New England. It has been indicated that states like Maine will be greatly impacted positively by the new program. The bays, inlets, and coves are proved to be good protective measures for most waterfront properties. In addition to Maine, states like Iowa and Nebraska will see impacts to their flood insurance policies. It is stated that almost 50% of Nebraskans and 40% of Iowans will see a decrease in their policies. Overall we see many different types of complications to this new set-up, such as retirees on fixed incomes, long-term mortgages, and depreciation of household value. As this program is relatively new, impacts of the program will continue to be seen in the following years.

=== Hurricane Katrina ===
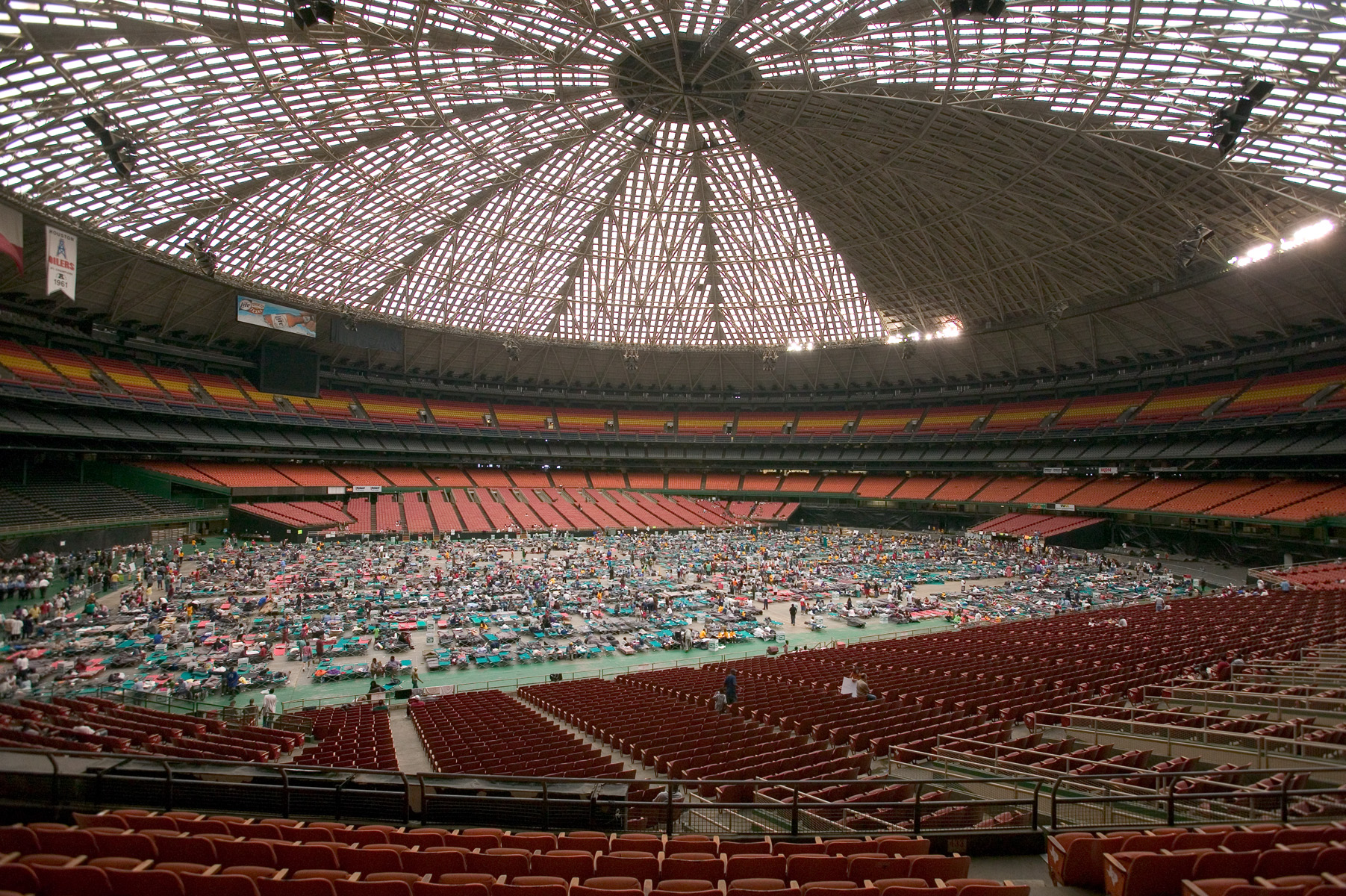
Evacuees taking shelter at the Astrodome in Houston, Texas

FEMA received intense criticism for its response to the Hurricane Katrina disaster in August 2005. FEMA had pre-positioned response personnel in the Gulf Coast region. However, many could not render direct assistance and were able to report only on the dire situation along the Gulf Coast, especially from New Orleans. Within three days, a large contingent of National Guard and active duty troops were deployed to the region.

The enormous number of evacuees simply overwhelmed rescue personnel. The situation was compounded by flood waters in the city that hampered transportation and poor communication among the federal government, state, and local entities. FEMA was widely criticized for what is seen as a slow initial response to the disaster and an inability to effectively manage, care for, and move those who were trying to leave the city.

Then-FEMA Director Michael D. Brown was criticized personally for a slow response and an apparent disconnection with the situation. Brown would eventually be relieved of command of the Katrina disaster and soon thereafter resigned.

According to the U.S. House of Representatives Select Bipartisan Committee to Investigate the Preparation for and Response to Hurricane Katrina:

- "The Secretary Department of Homeland Security should have designated the Principal Federal Official on Saturday, two days prior to landfall, from the roster of PFOs who had successfully completed the required training, unlike then FEMA Director Michael Brown. Considerable confusion was caused by the Secretary's PFO decisions."
- "DHS and FEMA lacked adequate trained and experienced staff for the Katrina response."
- "The readiness of FEMA's national emergency response teams was inadequate and reduced the effectiveness of the federal response."
- "Long-standing weaknesses and the magnitude of the disaster overwhelmed FEMA's ability to provide emergency shelter and temporary housing."
- "FEMA logistics and contracting systems did not support a targeted, massive, and sustained provision of commodities."
- "Before Katrina, FEMA suffered from a lack of sufficiently trained procurement professionals."

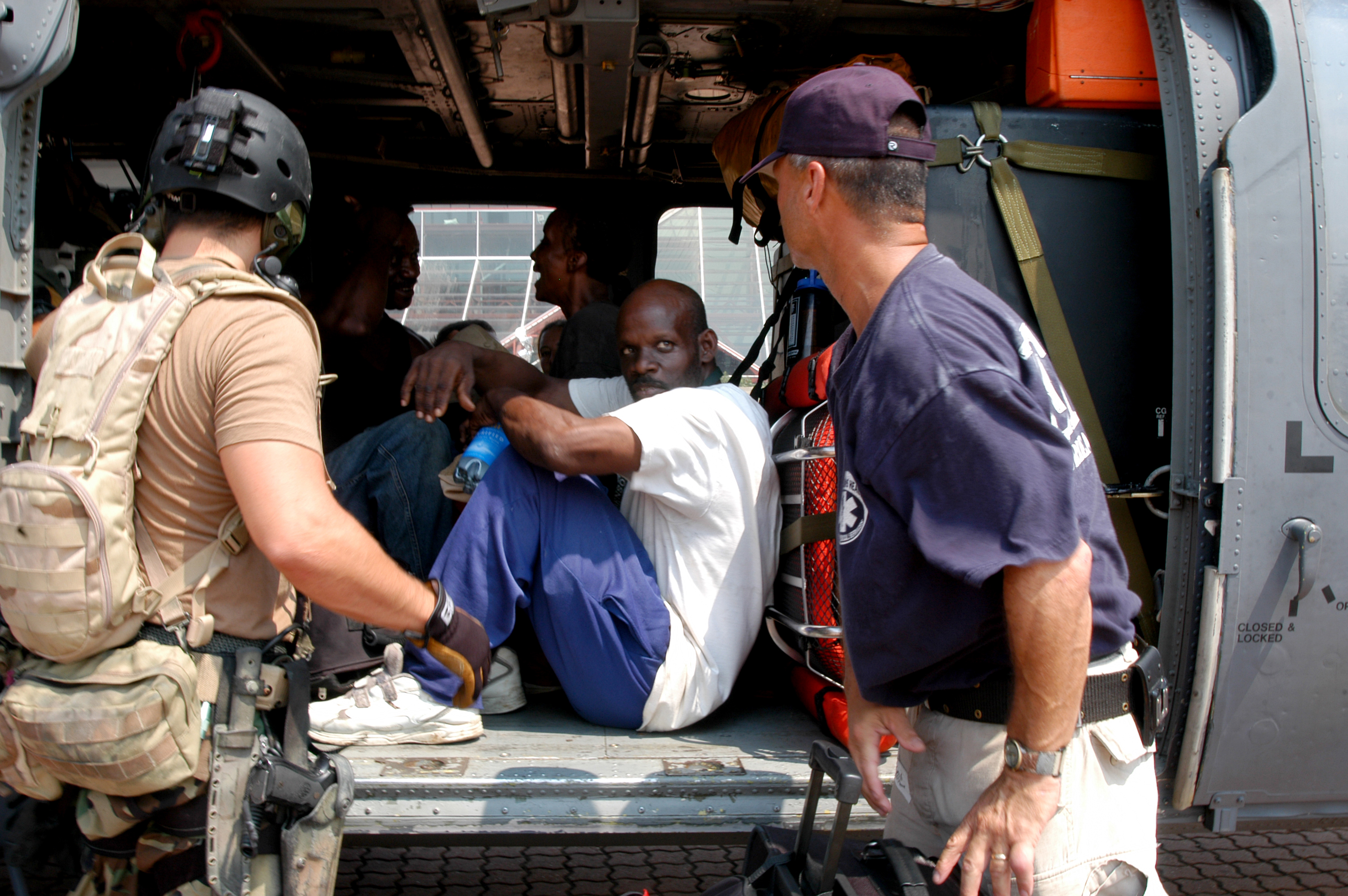
A DMAT member assures a rescued man that the trip to the airport will be safe.

Other failings were also noted. The Committee devoted an entire section of the report to listing the actions of FEMA. Their conclusion was:

For years emergency management professionals have been warning that FEMA's preparedness has eroded. Many believe this erosion is a result of the separation of the preparedness function from FEMA, the drain of long-term professional staff along with their institutional knowledge and expertise, and the inadequate readiness of FEMA's national emergency response teams. The combination of these staffing, training, and organizational structures made FEMA's inadequate performance in the face of a disaster the size of Katrina all but inevitable.

Pursuant to a temporary restraining order issued by Hon. Stanwood R. Duval, United States District Court Judge, Eastern District of Louisiana as a result of the McWaters v. FEMA class-action, February 7, 2006, was set as the deadline for the official end of any further coverage of temporary housing costs for Katrina victims.

After the February 7 deadline, Katrina victims were left to their own devices either to find permanent housing for the long term or to continue in social welfare programs set up by other organizations. There were many Katrina evacuees living in temporary shelters or trailer parks set up by FEMA and other relief organizations in the first months after the disaster hit, but much more were still unable to find housing.

In July 2007, ice that had been ordered for Katrina victims but had never been used and kept in storage facilities, at a cost of $12.5 million, was melted down.

In June 2008, a CNN investigation found that FEMA gave away about $85 million in household goods meant for Hurricane Katrina victims to 16 other states.

=== Buffalo snowstorm ===
FEMA came under attack for their response to the October Surprise Storm in Buffalo, New York, on October 13, 2006. As FEMA legally cannot interfere with state business unless asked, FEMA responded that as per procedure, the governor of the state of New York, George Pataki, had not asked for FEMA's assistance. FEMA Headquarters had been in constant contact with State congressional offices providing them with the latest information available. Claims state that FEMA officials did not arrive until October 16, three days after the storm hit. The snowstorm damage by this time included downed power wires, downed trees, and caused structural damage to homes and businesses.

=== Dumas, Arkansas, tornadoes ===
Many people of Dumas, Arkansas, especially victims of tornadoes on February 24, 2007, criticized FEMA's response in not supplying the number of new trailers they needed, and sending only a set of used trailers, lower than the needed quantity. Following the storm, U.S. Senator Mark Pryor had criticized FEMA's response to the recovery and cleanup efforts.

=== California wildfires ===
FEMA came under intense criticism when it was revealed that a press conference on the October 2007 California wildfires was staged. Deputy Administrator Harvey E. Johnson was answering questions from FEMA employees who were posing as reporters. Many of these questions were "softball" questions (i.e., "Are you happy with FEMA's response so far?"), intentionally asked in a way that would evoke a positive response giving the impression that FEMA was doing everything right. In this way, any scrutiny from real reporters (many of whom were given only a 15-minute notice) would have been avoided. Fox News, MSNBC, and other media outlets aired the staged press briefing live. Real reporters were notified only 15 minutes in advance and were able to call into only a conference line, which was set to "listen-only" mode. The only people there were primarily FEMA public affairs employees.

=== Hurricane Maria ===
FEMA has funded over 11,000 recovery projects totaling more than $33.9 billion for Hurricane María, primarily focused on restoring permanent infrastructure. This includes nearly $600 million approved for materials and equipment to help rebuild Puerto Rico's power grid. Planned improvements include the installation of approximately 2,500 miles of transmission lines, 23 miles of submarine cable to serve the islands of Vieques and Culebra, more than 300 substations, nearly 200,000 transformers, and about 13,400 miles of distribution feeders.

In September 2017, Hurricane Maria struck Dominica and Puerto Rico with 175 mph (280 km/h) sustained winds. Maria was the fifth-strongest storm to ever strike the United States with stronger winds than those brought by Irma and similar rain brought to Houston by Hurricane Harvey. Despite FEMA's preemptive efforts in Puerto Rico, the island was still devastated beyond expectation. The agency had prepared some provisions for displaced residents before the storm struck, including: roughly 124 FEMA staff members being positioned on the island, food, water, and bedding. However, people reported the FEMA food packages were unhealthy snacks such as the confectionery Skittles. FEMA was widely criticized for its response to Maria, as the island quickly fell into a humanitarian crisis.

The island also experienced a massive loss of power as a result of flood and wind damage sustained during Maria. In the beginning of October 2017, Lieutenant General Todd Semonite, chief and commanding general of the United States Army Corps of Engineers, explained the extent of and necessity of aid for this power crisis. Semonite described some specifics of the outage to reporters, explaining that the island requires "2,700 megawatts of electricity to operate and at last count had 376 megawatts available." This translates to about 14 percent of the grid being functional.

FEMA Administrator William "Brock" Long told reporters in a briefing following the storm that Puerto Rico politics had hindered the ability of the federal government to send aid. He explained that political divisions had prevented unity for leaders in this time of crisis, describing that their issue was "even worse" than the mainland United States' issue between Democrats and Republicans. Residents, in some cases, were required to fill out paperwork in English rather than Spanish with little to no hope of receiving the aid they had requested.

Brigadier General Jose Reyes of the Puerto Rico National Guard discussed a strategy to quicken the arrival of resources via the Port of Ponce, located on the southern coast of Puerto Rico. Reyes also attributed the delay in these services to the unprecedented series of storms that demanded attention from the agency within a short period of time. Regarding this, General Reyes told reporters " We were not even getting back on our feet after Irma, then suddenly we got hit by Maria." He also addressed the disparities between aid sent to mainland disaster-stricken areas and Puerto Rico, explaining that in areas such as Florida and Texas, who had recently struck with similar damages, transportation of resources is relatively simpler. This is because they are able to utilize infrastructure to transport aid. Transporting similar resources to Puerto Rico has proved to be more difficult, as they must travel across the ocean, either in aircraft or in ships. Long also mentioned that Puerto Rico's international airport was not able to operate at full capacity, which posed an additional obstacle for federal aid imports.

Long resigned on March 8, 2019, following criticism of his handling of Hurricane Maria and an ethical complaint over misuse of official vehicles, costing $151,000. Homeland Security Secretary Kirstjen Nielsen said that Long would have to reimburse the government for the cost of the vehicles and staff involved in the trips, many of which were between Washington and his home in North Carolina. Nielsen submitted her resignation as Secretary of Homeland Security less than a month later on April 7, 2019.

=== Hurricane Harvey ===
Hurricane Harvey made landfall in late August 2017 as a Category 4 Hurricane with 130 mph (215 km/h) sustained winds. The Hurricane predominantly affected southeast Texas; however, its effects were felt as far as Arkansas, Kentucky, and Tennessee in the form of flash flooding. Harvey slowly progressed around southeast Texas, where it produced heavy precipitation over the region. This caused heavy flooding in residential areas such as Colorado City, Liberty, and Montgomery, Texas.

Harvey was the first of a series of hurricanes and tropical storms to affect the United States between August and September 2017. The effects of these storms included extreme flooding, damage from high speed winds, structural damage, and humanitarian concerns regarding the availability of basic necessities such as food, water, and shelter.

Some recipients were forced to wait up to two months before receiving aid from FEMA, as technical complications held up both their application for it and the processing of said applications. Some residents were denied Federal Aid and have to dispute their denial in efforts to rebuild and repair properties without taking a considerably large financial loss.

=== Coronavirus pandemic (COVID-19) ===
In early April 2020, the Los Angeles Times reported that the Trump administration was "quietly" seizing medical supplies from states and hospitals, citing hospital and clinic officials catering to seven states. These officials stated that the administration has not informed them how they can otherwise get access to their ordered supplies. A FEMA representative said the agency, working with the Department of Health and Human Services and the Department of Defense, has developed a system for identifying needed supplies from vendors and distributing them equitably. The federal government also seized an order for thermometers meant for Florida, an order for masks from the Texas Association of Community Health Centers, and an order for testing supplies meant for the PeaceHealth hospital system in Washington, Oregon and Alaska.

On April 24, San Francisco Mayor London Breed said "We've had situations when things we've ordered that have gone through Customs were confiscated by FEMA to be diverted to other locations. We know everyone is dealing with a serious challenge. Through Customs, we've had situations where those items have been taken and put out on the market for the highest bidder, putting cities against cities and states against states."

Massachusetts Secretary of Health and Human Services Marylou Sudders cited a shipment of 3 million masks that the state had negotiated to buy from BJ's Wholesale Club, until the federal government impounded them from the Port of New York and New Jersey on March 18. A further order from MSC Industrial Supply for 400 masks to be delivered on March 20 was also claimed by the federal government using force majeure. Massachusetts Governor Charlie Baker reached out to the New England Patriots professional American football team, who used the team plane "AirKraft" to bring approximately 1.2 million N95 masks from China to Boston.

In late April, reports of the actions taken by FEMA in Massachusetts prompted Maryland Governor Larry Hogan to deploy the Maryland National Guard and task them with guarding a shipment of 500,000 COVID-19 testing kits purchased from South Korean company LabGenomics by the Government of Maryland. The tests were subsequently held in an "undisclosed location," under the continued supervision of the Maryland National Guard.

The state of Colorado was set to purchase 500 ventilators before Federal Emergency Management Agency swooped in and bought them first. President Trump announced on Twitter that the federal government would be sending 100 ventilators to Colorado at the request of Senator Cory Gardner. The incident caused Colorado Governor Polis to make future supply purchases in secret.

In late April, 5,000,000 masks meant for hospitals of the Veterans Health Administration were seized by FEMA and redirected to the Strategic National Stockpile, stated Richard Stone, Executive in Charge, Veterans Health Administration. After an appeal from Veterans Affairs Secretary Robert Wilkie to FEMA, the agency provided the VA with 500,000 masks.

=== Hurricane Ian ===
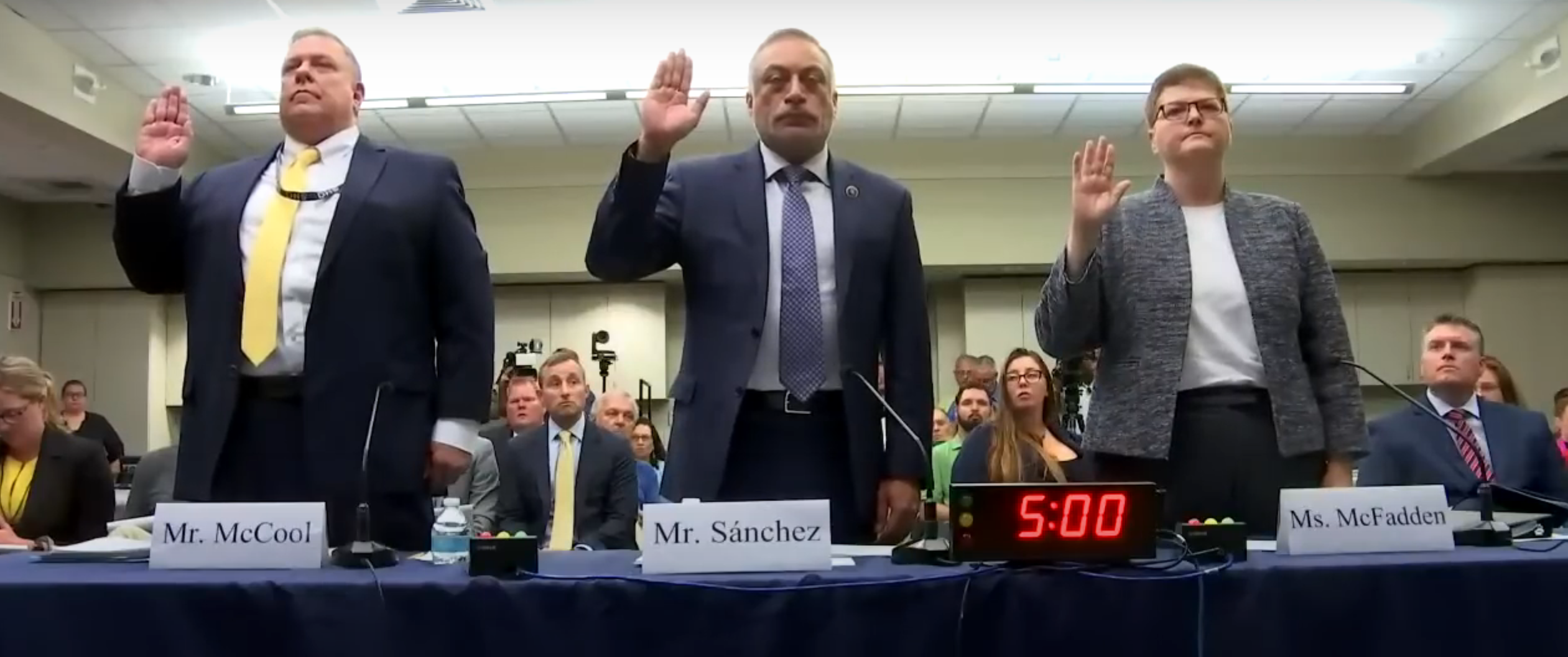
FEMA, SBA, and HUD officials giving an oath to testify truthfully during the hearing

On August 10, 2023, the United States House Subcommittee on Government Operations and the Federal Workforce, a subcommittee under the House Committee on Oversight and Government Reform, held a televised investigative hearing on the federal government's response to and overall recovery efforts from Hurricane Ian, which struck Florida in September 2022.

=== Hurricanes Helene and Milton ===
Between November 2024–March 2025, the United States Congress held four separate televised investigative hearings on the federal government's response to, overall recovery efforts from, and criminal events following Milton and Hurricane Helene a few weeks earlier.

=== July 2025 Central Texas floods ===
By the time of the July 2025 Central Texas floods disaster, the Trump administration had reduced FEMA staff by one-fifth since taking office, and FEMA preparedness training ceased for months, shutting out over 7,000 trainees. Therefore, FEMA's response to this catastrophic event will likely be closely scrutinized. The National Emergency Management Association, as part of a coalition of stakeholders, states in a June 30, 2025, letter to Department of Homeland Security that FEMA “has not opened applications for a large number of key grants and is missing legally mandated deadlines to ensure the funds can be distributed.” Such grants support emergency management staffing and resources for 82% of U.S. counties, particularly in rural areas.

The Trump administration has the stated goal of reducing—or even eliminating—the federal role of FEMA, and having individual states assume emergency management responsibilities instead; there is evidence that the flow of information from and within FEMA is thus being deliberately stifled—a situation which is hampering the agency's ability to efficiently communicate and work with state officials, and even with other parts of the federal government, thus “jeopardizing emergency response and homeland security capabilities, putting ‘critical infrastructure’ at risk.” With regard to the July 2025 Central Texas floods, a former FEMA administrator observes that “Texas has already requested assistance for search and rescue… Oklahoma and Louisiana are sending search and rescue teams in,” and she points out that out-of-state teams are, in fact, FEMA trained and funded, begging the questions she poses: “What happens if that funding for their ongoing training goes away?” and “How are they going to be able to sustain that?”

== Federalism and FEMA ==
The costs of a disaster to states and localities can escalate quickly. Federal assistance becomes fully available with the approval of the President and at the request of the governor. Public help for governments to repair facilities is 75% federally funded with local governments responsible for covering the rest (unless the state grants aid or loans). FEMA does not compensate for buildings that have been improperly maintained by the state or local government nor does it pay to upgrade or improve facilities. FEMA coordinates but does not fund disaster assistance provided by the Small Business Administration or the Farmers Home Administration. FEMA grant-in aid funds come from revenue sharing, the Department of Housing and Urban Development and the Department of Transportation. Grants for disaster preparedness can be used by flood control districts.

Many states have disaster relief agencies of their own. In the event of a disaster outside of a state's operating capacity, the director of said agency will advise the Governor whether or not to proclaim a state of emergency. Declaring a state of emergency, upon Presidential approval, entitles a state to federal assistance.

Proclaiming a state of emergency does not guarantee federal assistance. States also rely on mutual aid agreements, such as the Civil Defense and Disaster Compact and Emergency Management Assistance Compact. A mutual aid agreement can be between neighboring states, cities, counties and cities, states and cities or an entire region. These agreements allow agencies to share resources so they are better prepared for emergencies.

Local governments have the most immediate responsibility. Four factors shape local disaster response:

1. The extent of tax base depletion
2. The scope of lost sales tax revenue
3. Access to other forms of revenue
4. Amount of city debt

Having a mostly intact tax base allows local governments to maintain steady revenue stream. Business unharmed by a disaster will be able to continue to generate sales tax revenue. Cities with access to large revenue reserves and strong mutual aid agreements will have greater response capacity. While cities with large municipal debt that would be unable to pay back state or federal loans would be in a difficult situation.

=== U.S. v. Parish of Jefferson et al ===
This case gave FEMA the right to sue in order to recover funds paid out in flood insurance claims for flood damage as a result of poor decisions by local officials and developers. The case also gave FEMA the power to sue localities who fail to meet flood plain management requirements.

== List of FEMA heads ==
Denotes acting capacity.

The following persons served as the head of FEMA:

No.	Portrait	Name	Start	End	Refs.	President
–		James Hafer (Note: Serving as the last director of the Office of Emergency Preparedness, the predecessor agency to FEMA)	May 1975	April 1, 1979		Gerald Ford (1974–1977)
–		Gordon Vickery (Note: Director of the U.S. Fire Administration serving as Acting Director of the newly created Federal Emergency Management Agency); Acting	April 1, 1979	July 1979		Jimmy Carter (1977–1981)
–		Thomas Casey (Note: Deputy Associate Director serving as acting director); Acting	July 1979	August 1979		Jimmy Carter (1977–1981)
1		John Macy	August 1979	January 20, 1981		Jimmy Carter (1977–1981)
–		Bernard Gallagher (Note: federal emergency preparedness manager at Mount Weather serving as acting director); Acting	January 20, 1981	April 1981		Ronald Reagan (1981–1989)
–		John McConnell; Acting	April 1981	May 1981		Ronald Reagan (1981–1989)
2		Jeff Giuffrida	May 1981	September 1, 1985		Ronald Reagan (1981–1989)
–		Robert Morris; Acting	September 1, 1985	November 1985		Ronald Reagan (1981–1989)
3		Julius Becton	November 1985	June 1989		Ronald Reagan (1981–1989)
–		Robert Morris; Acting	June 1989	May 1990		George H. W. Bush (1989–1993)
–		Jerry Jennings; Acting	May 1990	August 1990		George H. W. Bush (1989–1993)
4		Wallace Stickney	August 1990	January 20, 1993		George H. W. Bush (1989–1993)
–		William Tidball; Acting	January 20, 1993	April 5, 1993		Bill Clinton (1993–2001)
5		James Witt	April 5, 1993	January 20, 2001		Bill Clinton (1993–2001)
–		John Magaw; Acting	January 20, 2001	February 15, 2001		George W. Bush (2001–2009)
6		Joe Allbaugh	February 15, 2001	April 15, 2003		George W. Bush (2001–2009)
7		Michael Brown	April 15, 2003	September 12, 2005		George W. Bush (2001–2009)
–		David Paulison	September 12, 2005	June 8, 2006		George W. Bush (2001–2009)
8		David Paulison	June 8, 2006	January 21, 2009		George W. Bush (2001–2009)
–		Nancy Ward; Acting	January 21, 2009	May 19, 2009		Barack Obama (2009–2017)
9		Craig Fugate	May 19, 2009	January 20, 2017		Barack Obama (2009–2017)
–		Bob Fenton; Acting	January 20, 2017	June 23, 2017		Donald Trump (2017–2021)
10		Brock Long	June 23, 2017	March 8, 2019		Donald Trump (2017–2021)
–		Pete Gaynor	March 8, 2019	January 14, 2020		Donald Trump (2017–2021)
11		Pete Gaynor	January 14, 2020	January 12, 2021		Donald Trump (2017–2021)
–		Bob Fenton; Acting	January 12, 2021	April 26, 2021		Joe Biden (2021–2025)
12		Deanne Criswell	April 26, 2021	January 20, 2025		Joe Biden (2021–2025)
–		Tony Robinson; Acting	January 20, 2025	January 22, 2025		Donald Trump (2025–present)
–		Cameron Hamilton; Acting	January 22, 2025	May 8, 2025		Donald Trump (2025–present)
–		David Richardson; Acting	May 8, 2025	November 30, 2025		Donald Trump (2025–present)
–		Karen Evans; Acting	December 1, 2025	May 12, 2026		Donald Trump (2025–present)
–		Bob Fenton; Acting	May 12, 2026	August 10, 2026		Donald Trump (2025–present)
13		Cameron Hamilton	August 10, 2026	present		Donald Trump (2025–present)

Table notes:

=== Titles ===
- Director of the Office of Emergency Preparedness within the General Services Administration (May 1975 – April 1, 1979)
- Director of Federal Emergency Management Agency as an independent agency (April 1, 1979 – April 15, 2003)
  - Elevated to Cabinet-level (February 26, 1996 – January 20, 2001)
- Director of Federal Emergency Management Agency and Under Secretary of Homeland Security for Emergency Preparedness and Response within the Department of Homeland Security (April 15, 2003 – June 8, 2006)
- Director of Federal Emergency Management Agency and Under Secretary of Homeland Security for Federal Emergency Management within the Department of Homeland Security (June 8, 2006 – March 31, 2007)
- Administrator of Federal Emergency Management Agency within the Department of Homeland Security (March 31, 2007 – present)

== See also ==
- History of homeland security in the United States
- United States civil defense
- Federal Civil Defense Authority
- FEMA photo library
- National Emergency Technology Guard
- PDD-62, the National Security Directive defining FEMA's counterterrorism jurisdiction
- Civil defense by country
- Civil Contingencies Secretariat, British counterpart emergency management agency
- Emergency Preparedness Canada, Canadian counterpart emergency management agency
- National Disaster Medical System
- Disaster Medical Assistance Teams
- Disaster Mortuary Operational Response Teams
- Integrated Public Alert and Warning System
