= International Pepper Community =

Intergovernmental organisation of pepper producing countries

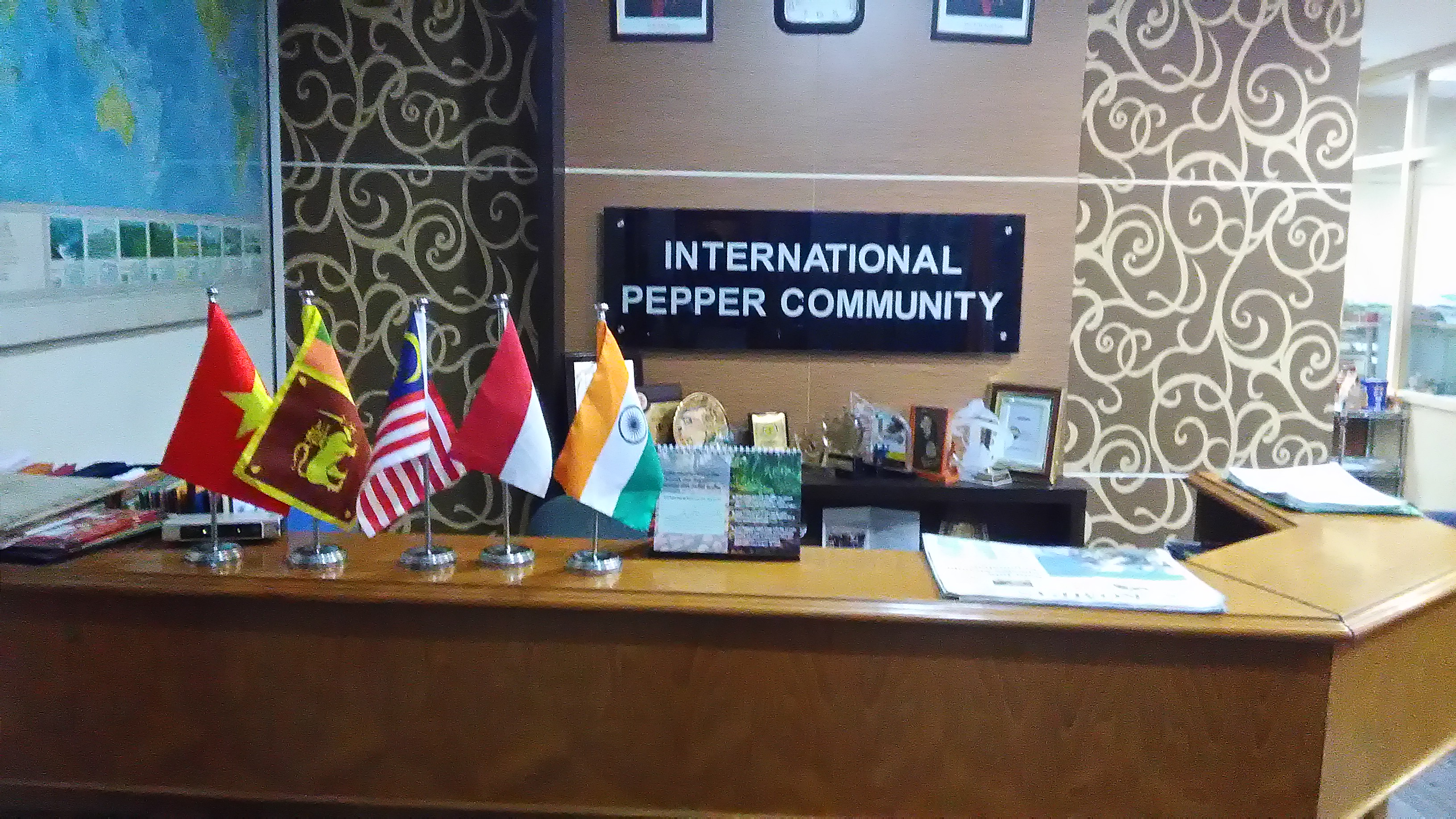

The International Pepper Community (IPC) is an intergovernmental organisation of pepper or peppercorn producing countries. Established in 1972, its headquarters are in Jakarta, Indonesia.

The organisation's mission is to promote the consumption of pepper, and coordinate research on technical aspects of pepper production. The IPC and its member countries have defined specifications for exported pepper, including microbial test procedures and a code of hygiene.

== History ==
The International Pepper Community was established In Bangkok on 16 April 1971, the Agreement establishing the International Pepper Community was concluded. After this treaty came into force on 29 March 1972, the IPC was created.

Six states have ratified the IPC Agreement and are thus full members of the IPC: Brazil (since 1981), India (1972), Indonesia (1972), Malaysia (1972), Sri Lanka (2002), and Vietnam (2005). Papua New Guinea and Philippines have not ratified the Agreement but have been admitted to the IPC as an associate member.

== See also ==
- International Pepper Exchange
