= Disaster Mortuary Operational Response Team =

US disaster victim identification team

A Disaster Mortuary Operational Response Team (DMORT) is a team of experts in the fields of disaster victim identification and mortuary services. DMORTs are activated in response to large scale disasters in the United States to assist in the identification of deceased individuals and storage of the bodies pending the bodies being claimed.

== Organization ==
For organizational purposes, the country is divided into ten regions, each with a regional coordinator. For the duration of their service, DMORT members work under the local authorities at the disaster site, and their professional licenses are recognized by all states.

DMORT Teams:

- REGION I (ME, NH, VT, MA, CT, RI)
- REGION II (NY, NJ, PR, VI)
- REGION III (PA, MD, DC, DE, VA, WV)
- REGION IV (AL, KY, TN, NC, SC, GA, MS, FL)
- REGION V (MN, WI, IL, IN, MI, OH)
- REGION VI (NM, TX, OK, AR, LA)
- REGION VII (NE, IA, KS, MO)
- REGION VIII (MT, ND, SD, WY, UT, CO)
- REGION IX (AZ, NV, CA, HI)
- REGION X (WA, AK, OR, ID)

DMORTs are organized under the Department of Health and Human Services National Disaster Medical System. The DMORTs are composed of civilian funeral directors, medical examiners, coroners, pathologists, forensic anthropologists, fingerprint specialists, forensic odontologists, dental assistants, and radiographers. They are supported by medical records technicians and transcribers, mental health specialists, computer professionals, administrative support staff, and security and investigative personnel. When a DMORT is activated, the personnel on the team are treated and paid as temporary federal employees.

The Department of Health and Human Services maintains three Disaster Portable Morgue Units (DPMU) which are staged at HHS Logistics Centers. There is one each in Frederick, Maryland; Fort Worth, Texas; and San Jose, California. Each DPMU is a cache of equipment and supplies for a complete morgue, with designated workstations for each process the DMORT team is required to complete.

== History ==
In the 1980s, the National Funeral Directors Association (NFDA) formed a committee to address the need for a way of dealing with mass casualty situations. The group had the goal of formulating a plan for funeral directors to deal with the situation. As the committee worked on the plan, it was revealed that such a situation would call for multiple forensic specialties. As a result, the committee created the first portable morgue unit in the country.

The committee's work came to the attention of the federal government following the complaints of families whose family members had been lost in airline incidents. The families felt that the remains hadn't received adequate treatment. The United States Congress passed the Family Assistance Act in 1996. The National Transportation Safety Board (NTSB) was assigned the role of managing the federal response to aviation disaster victims and their families. The division responsible for this response was the Office of Family Affairs, which was later renamed the Office of Transportation Disaster Assistance. The NTSB made use of DMORTs to handle large scale transportation disasters.

Following the creation of the Department of Homeland Security in 2002, the DMORTs were moved into the Emergency Preparedness and Response directorate as part of the National Disaster Medical System. In 2007, the National Disaster Medical System was removed from DHS and returned to the Department of Health and Human Services under the control of the Assistant Secretary for Preparedness and Response.^{[reference does not support statement]}

== Identification of remains ==
Identification of remains is a two-part process that utilizes computer programs for matching physical characteristics. The families of the deceased provide as much information about them as possible: dental records, x-rays, photographs or descriptions of tattoos, clothing and jewelry; blood type information and objects that may contain the deceased's DNA, such as hair or a toothbrush. The information gathered, called antemortem, or "before death" information, is entered into a computer program called VIP (Victim Identification Profile), which is capable of assimilating 800 different item categories, including graphics, photographs and x-rays. As forensic scientists (pathologists, anthropologists, odontologists) examine the recovered remains, they enter their findings—called postmortem data—into VIP (Victim Identification Profile). Depending on the availability of data, the WIN-VIP system enables scientists to match the remains to their identity.

== Incidents ==
For the World Trade Center attack, Secretary of Health and Human Services Tommy G. Thompson activated the National Disaster Medical System. It was the first time this system had been activated on a full nationwide basis. In Manhattan, a team set up morgue outside Bellevue Hospital.

In 2006, DMORT operated the Find Family National Call Center in Baton Rouge, Louisiana. This is the center of all operations concerning the location and reuniting of families scattered by Hurricane Katrina and Hurricane Rita. Out of nearly 13,000 people reported missing after the impacts of hurricanes Katrina, Rita, Stan, and Wilma, nearly 7,000 were found alive and reunited with their families.
