= National Disaster Medical System =

American organization

National Disaster Medical System logo.

The National Disaster Medical System (NDMS) is a system of the United States federal government that coordinates disaster-related medical services and support across the Departments of Health and Human Services (HHS), Homeland Security (DHS), Defense (DOD), and Veterans Affairs (VA). Established in 1984, NDMS organized through the Administration for Strategic Preparedness and Response within DHHS and is part of the broader federal civil defense system called the National Response Framework.

NDMS provides medical assistance to the governments of states, local governments, tribes, and territories during disasters by supplementing their existing health systems when local capacity is overwhelmed. NDMS provides general emergency medicine, emergency medical services, acute medicine, ambulatory medicine, patient stabilization, patient transportation, facility management support as well as veterinary medicine. In wartime, it can also support military and VA hospitals if combat casualty numbers exceed their capacity.

Common NDMS missions include augmenting hospital capacity in disaster areas to relieve overtaxed emergency departments, providing veterinary care for federal working animals during national special security events such as presidential inaugurations, and managing fatalities following major transportation disasters in coordination with the National Transportation Safety Board and affected local government authorities.

While primarily designed for domestic disaster response, NDMS teams and personnel have been deployed internationally to assist with major disasters, including earthquakes in Iran and Haiti.

== Organization ==
NDMS has three major components:

1. Emergency medical response by medical teams made up by Federal Intermittent Employees (IFEs) (civilians who are federalized when activated), equipment, and supplies deployed to a disaster area when requested by State or local authorities
2. Movement of ill and injured patients from a disaster area to areas unaffected by the disaster
3. Definitive care of patients at hospitals in areas unaffected by the disaster.

Over 5,000 NDMS civilian medical personnel (IFEs) are organized into a number of types of teams, designed to provide medical services supporting the Federal Public Health and Medical Services (Emergency Support Function - 8) mission.

=== NDMS Teams ===
The NDMS is made up of several teams that have specific capabilities.

- Disaster Medical Assistance Team (DMAT) - provides medical care during a disaster or other incident. Fifty-five Disaster Medical Assistance Teams (DMATs), which include specialized teams to handle burns, pediatrics, crush injuries, surgery and mental health.
- Disaster Mortuary Operational Response Team (DMORT) - provides forensic analysis of human remains in order to identify victims following a disaster or major transportation incident. Eleven of these teams, which consist of private citizens with specialized training and experience to help in the recovery, identification and processing of deceased victims, including one team with WMD capabilities.
- Victim Identification Center (VIC) - conducts interviews with family members to gather ante mortem information, including DNA samples, to assist in identifying human remains.
- National Veterinary Response Team (NVRT) - provides veterinary services in a disaster area, or assessment and consultation regarding the need for veterinary services following major disasters or emergencies
- Federal Coordinating Centers (FCCs) - recruit hospitals and maintain local non-Federal hospital participation in the NDMS, conduct patient reception planning, and coordinate patient reception exercises with stakeholders in the patient reception area
- Trauma and Critical Care Team (TCCT), known as International Medical Surgical Response Team (IMSuRT) prior to 2017 - widely recognized as a specialized team, trained and equipped to establish a fully capable field surgical facility anywhere in the world. TCCTs provide critical, surgical, and emergency care to help people in the wake of disaster or emergency.
- Incident Management Team (IMT) - Provides the field management component of the Federal public health and medical response. The IRCT provides liaisons in the field to coordinate with jurisdictional, Tribal, or State incident management and provides the field management and coordination for deployed HHS and other ESF #8 assets to integrate those assets with the State and local response.

Over 1,800 civilian hospitals in the United States are voluntary members of NDMS. Their role is to provide approximately 100,000 hospital beds to support NDMS operations in an emergency. When a civilian or military crisis requires the activation of the NDMS system, participating hospitals communicate their available bed types and numbers to a central control point. Patients can be distributed to a number of hospitals without overwhelming any one facility with casualties.

== Operations ==
Under the NDMS, the evacuation of patients from a disaster area is coordinated by the FCCs in each of the 10 FEMA regions. The actual transport is conducted by the Department of Defense. Patients arriving in a region are then dispersed to a local NDMS participating hospital.

In the aftermath of Hurricane Katrina in the fall of 2005, the NDMS system activated almost all of their civilian medical teams to assist victims in Texas, Louisiana, and Mississippi; helped evacuate hundreds of medical patients from the affected areas; and augmented medical staffing levels at hospitals impacted by the evacuations.

== Parent agencies ==
Originally established in 1984, the NDMS operated under the Public Health Service within DHHS. Following the September 11 attacks in 2001, the newly formed Department of Homeland Security requested authority over the NDMS in 2003. This transfer placed the system under the direction of the Federal Emergency Management Agency (FEMA).

After Hurricane Katrina exposed operational deficiencies, the Pandemic and All-Hazards Preparedness Act reorganized the NDMS back under HHS effective January 1, 2007. The system was then positioned within the assistant secretary for preparedness and response (ASPR) office of emergency management (OEM), which was established after a 2012 reorganization of the previous Office of Preparedness and Emergency Operations.

The ASPR office of emergency management develops operational plans, analytical products, and training exercises to ensure preparedness across government agencies and the public for responses to domestic and international public health and medical threats and emergencies. OEM also maintains the systems, logistical support, and procedures necessary for the department to coordinate operational responses to acts of terrorism and other public health and medical emergencies. Through its regional planning and response coordination capability, OEM holds operational responsibility for NDMS functions, which it executes through the division of national disaster medical system.

OEM primary operational liaison responsibilities
OEM liaison within HHS	OEM liaison outside HHS
Food and Drug Administration (FDA)	United States Department of Agriculture (USDA),
Health Resources and Services Administration (HRSA)	United States Department of Veterans Affairs (USDVA),
Substance Abuse and Mental Health Services Administration (SAMHSA)	United States Department of Defense(USDOD),
Centers for Disease Control and Prevention (CDC)	Federal Emergency Management Agency(FEMA)
Centers for Medicare and Medicaid Services (CMS)	
Administration for Children and Families (ACF)	
