= Disaster medical assistance team =

Group of rapid-response medical personnel

National Disaster Medical System logo.

A Disaster Medical Assistance Team (DMAT) is a specialized group under the National Disaster Medical System (NDMS), part of the U.S. Department of Health and Human Services. These teams are composed of professional medical personnel including physicians, physician assistants (PA), nurses, paramedics, pharmacists, and logistical and administrative support staff. DMATs are deployed to provide rapid-response medical care, support hospitals with excess patient loads, and engage in patient triage and emergency care during significant incidents such as natural disasters, terrorist attacks, disease outbreaks, and national special security events.

Their capabilities include pre-hospital care, emergency medical care equivalent to a basic hospital emergency department, general medical care when regular services are unavailable, hospital decompression, support of patient movement, and mass prophylaxis to control disease outbreaks.

DMAT members, who are federal intermittent employees, possess a diverse set of skills allowing them to operate effectively in a variety of challenging environments, from supporting mass vaccination efforts during the COVID-19 pandemic to providing care in the aftermath of hurricanes and other natural disasters. Despite their intermittent status, members' employment rights are protected under the Uniformed Services Employment and Reemployment Rights Act (USERRA), ensuring they are not disadvantaged in their civilian careers due to their service.

The NDMS also includes other specialized teams such as Trauma and Critical Care Teams (TCCT), Disaster Mortuary Operational Response Teams (DMORT), National Veterinary Response Teams (NVRT), and Victim Information Center Teams (VIC), each with specific roles in disaster response.

The system's Definitive Care Reimbursement Program further supports healthcare providers by reimbursing for the care provided to NDMS patients under certain conditions.

Historically, NDMS and its DMATs have been activated for more than 300 domestic and international incidents, demonstrating a significant commitment to disaster response and emergency medical care in the United States.

== Organization ==
There are 80 NDMS Teams of which 55 are DMATs spread out across the country, formed of local groups of health care providers and support personnel. Under the National Response Framework (NRF), DMATs are defined according to their level of capability and experience. Once a level of training and proficiency has been shown, a higher level of priority is given the team.

In addition to medical DMATs, there are other response teams that specialize in specific types of medical emergencies such as hazardous material handling and decontamination and LRATs, which are primarily logistical response teams to support any of the response teams under the NDMS umbrella. Such other types of teams are TCCT (Tactical and Critical Care Response Team), DMORT (Disaster Mortuary Operations Response Team), NVRT (National Veterinary Medical Response Team), LRAT (Logistics Response Team), IMT (Incident Management Team) and VIP (Victim Identification Personnel Team).

A DMAT deploys to disaster sites with the assurance by ASPR that supplies and equipment will arrive at or before the teams arrive at a disaster site, so that they can be self-sufficient for 72 hours while providing medical care at a fixed or temporary site. Responsibilities may include triaging patients, providing high-quality medical care in adverse and austere environments, and preparing patients for evacuation. Other situations may involve providing primary medical care or augmenting overloaded local health care facilities and staffs. DMATs have been used to implement mass inoculations and other immediate needs to large populations. Under rare circumstances, disaster victims may be evacuated to a different locale to receive medical care. DMATs may be activated to support patient reception and distribution of patients to hospitals.

== Team composition and equipment ==
DMATs are composed of physicians, nurse practitioners, physician assistants, nurses, paramedics, pharmacists and pharmacy technicians, respiratory therapists, mental health specialists, and a variety of other allied health and logistical personnel. DMATs typically have 85 members, from which the team leader chooses up to 35 members to deploy on missions requiring a full team. Smaller strike teams or other modular units (Health and Medical Task Forces, or HMTFs) can also be rostered and deployed when less than full-scale deployments are needed.

DMAT members are termed "intermittent" federal employees and once activated by federal order, their status changes to one of an active federal employee, following the GS pay scale. Federally-activated DMAT members are protected from tort liability while in operation and are also protected by the provisions of the Uniformed Services Employment and Reemployment Rights Act (USERRA) which affords the same protections extended to deployed National Guard and active-duty military in that their full-time jobs are not placed in jeopardy. This protection came in 2003 after an act of Congress.

DMATs formerly traveled equipped with medical equipment and supplies, large tents, generators, and other support equipment (cache) necessary to establish a base of operations: designed to be self-sufficient for up to 72 hours in a disaster area and treating up to 250 patients per day. However, during the period 2009–2011, ASPR changed the operational tactics and removed team caches to a small number of federal warehouses to save money; thus teams no longer had the opportunity to practice and train with their own caches. The capability is similar to an urgent-care health facility. In 2005, FEMA increased the response capabilities of DMATs by issuing trucks to teams who obtained a certain standard of training and capabilities. But they, too, were reclaimed by ASPR and are only available during actual deployments to deliver the caches from the federal warehouses.

History and evolution

The Disaster Medical Assistance Teams (DMATs) are a critical component of the National Disaster Medical System (NDMS), designed to provide rapid-response medical care in the wake of public health and medical emergencies that overwhelm local, state, tribal, or territorial resources. DMATs offer a wide range of medical services during natural and technological disasters, acts of terrorism, and disease outbreaks, and also provide support at national special security events like presidential inaugurations.

The initial two prototype DMATs were formed by the Department of Health and Human Services in 1984; one was based out of the National Institutes of Health campus in Bethesda, MD and the other was based out of the Health Resources and Services Administration in Rockville, MD. The two HHS prototype DMATs merged in 1993 under the direction of RADM Frank Young, who was the Director of the Office of Emergency Preparedness, which ran the NDMS. After NDMS was transferred to the Department of Homeland Security, HHS lost operational control of the unified USPHS DMAT, so it chose to terminate the USPHS DMAT in 2006 and create a new entity, using former DMAT members as the backbone for its command staff, calling it a Rapid Deployment Force (RDF) team. Unlike a DMAT, an RDF had the much larger mission of setting up and running federal medical stations, which housed up to 300 special needs patients in shelters after a disaster. There were 5 RDFs across the nation, and they were only composed of USPHS Commissioned Corps officers, whereas the USPHS DMAT had a mix of mostly USPHS Commissioned Corps officers plus federal and federalized civilians.

DMATs consist of diverse professionals, including advanced clinicians, physicians, nurses, respiratory therapists, paramedics, pharmacists, safety and logistical specialists, information technologists, and communication and administrative staff. This variety makes the team highly adaptable because they are prepared to perform medical triage, emergency care, support infusion centers and vaccine sites, decompress hospital emergency rooms, support patient movement, and more, often under austere conditions.

The NDMS, including DMATs, was initially under the U.S. Public Health Service within the Department of Health and Human Services (HHS). After the September 11 attacks, the Department of Homeland Security (DHS) took over the convening authority over NDMS, placing it under the direction of the Federal Emergency Management Agency (FEMA). However, following Hurricane Katrina and amid allegations of mismanagement, NDMS was reorganized back under HHS as legislated by the Pandemic and All-Hazards Preparedness Act (PAHPA), effective January 1, 2007, and is now positioned organizationally within the Assistant Secretary for Preparedness and Response (ASPR)

An example of DMAT in action includes the deployment of the OH-1 DMAT and the USPHS DMAT to assist victims of Hurricane Marilyn in St. Thomas, US Virgin Islands, in 1995, where they functioned in place of the local Emergency Department, providing care to over 1,500 victims in a week

== Incidents ==
The first ever DMAT deployment occurred in 1989, when the New Mexico DMAT (NM-1) responded to the US Virgin Islands following Hurricane Hugo. The next DMAT deployments were in 1992, for Hurricane Iniki, to the island of Kauai, and a short time later to Florida for Hurricane Andrew. In 1994, teams responded for the 6.7 Magnitude Northridge Earthquake, in southern California, augmenting hospitals that were overwhelmed, and providing medical care at areas where people made homeless congregated. NDMS DMATs have been called to respond to a variety of other incidents, many of which garnered significant media attention. Teams responded to the World Trade Center site and the Pentagon following the 9/11 terrorist attacks. Some DMAT personnel were used to assist in the collection of remains for identification by DMORTs at Ground Zero. Three DMATs responded when the city of Grand Forks had to be almost completely evacuated when the Red River of the North flooded the city in the spring of 1997, providing mass care at a large shelter for over 10,000 evacuees at the Grand Forks Air Force Base.

DMATs are a critical element of the federal response to natural disasters including Hurricane Katrina. During Katrina DMAT teams treated and helped evacuate patients in and around New Orleans, including people at the Louisiana Superdome and Louis Armstrong New Orleans International Airport.

Twelve DMATs participated in the international response to the 2010 Haiti earthquake and cared for more than 31,300 patients, including 167 surgeries and the delivery of 45 infants.

More recently, DMATs have aided in the response to Hurricane Sandy, which was particularly devastating to areas of New York and New Jersey. Following Hurricane Harvey, DMATs provided shelter care as well as acute care in field locations in, around and south of Houston, TX. A prolonged response for Hurricanes Irma and Maria took place in Florida, Puerto Rico and the US Virgin Islands in 2017 by multiple full teams and smaller task forces of DMAT personnel.

Multiple deployments took place in response to the COVID-19 pandemic were made to support hospitals overrun by COVID-19 patients and/or with staff depletions due to healthcare provider illnesses from COVID-19, and to provide staff to vaccination and monoclonal antibody stations. Additional deployments by specialized aeromedical evacuation personnel from DMATs assisted in the evacuation of State Dept employees from Wuhan China, US citizens from a cruise ship quarantined in Japan, and aboard the Grand Princess Cruise Ship at sea to identify the most ill passengers that needed to be evacuated soonest from the ship when it arrived in port.

In October 2022, ongoing deployments occurred in response to Hurricane Ian in the hardest hit areas of southwestern Florida. In late September and early October of 2024, multiple DMATs were deployed in support of local resources during Hurricane Helene in western North Carolina.

== See also ==
- Emergency response
- Community Emergency Response Team (CERT)
- FEMA
