= Bridget Bean =

American government official

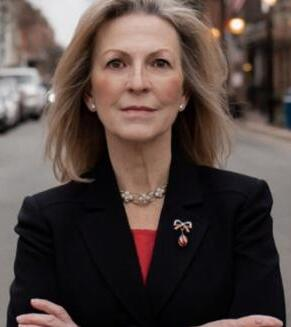
- Bean in 2023

Director of the Cybersecurity and Infrastructure Security Agency
- Acting
- In office January 20, 2025 – May 19, 2025
- President: Donald Trump
- Preceded by: Jen Easterly
- Succeeded by: Madhu Gottumukkala (Acting)

Personal details
- Education: George Mason University (BA)

Bridget E. Bean is an American government official who had served as the acting director of the Cybersecurity and Infrastructure Security Agency (CISA). She has also held the position of executive director of CISA since August 2024, following previous senior roles at the Federal Emergency Management Agency (FEMA) and the U.S. Small Business Administration (SBA).

== Education ==
Bean earned a B.A. in European studies from George Mason University.

== Career ==
Bean began working at the U.S. Small Business Administration (SBA) in 1994 as deputy assistant administrator. In that role, she oversaw contracts and grants management valued at more than $250 million, including areas such as warrant authority, facilities, security, and records management. She later held positions at the SBA including deputy chief operating officer, chief human capital officer, and Washington metropolitan district director.

Bean later worked at Federal Emergency Management Agency (FEMA) in various roles. In August 2019, she was nominated by the U.S. president Donald Trump to serve as the deputy administrator for resilience where she led a team of approximately 1,600 employees and managed an annual budget of $600 million. She also directed the Grants Program Directorate, which included managing $20 billion in Homeland Security grants and overseeing a $600 million Grants Management Modernization project.

In 2022, Bean joined the Cybersecurity and Infrastructure Security Agency (CISA) as chief integration officer. In that role, she was responsible for coordinating regional components of the agency and facilitating collaboration among stakeholders, infrastructure operators, and government entities to address cybersecurity and physical security issues.

From December 2021 to August 2024, she was assistant director for the Integrated Operations Division at CISA. Her responsibilities included managing the agency's operational coordination, information sharing, and situational awareness. She also oversaw operational reporting and intelligence product development related to cyber, physical, and communications activities, as well as continuity planning and internal drills.

In August 2024, Bean became executive director of CISA, following the departure of Brandon Wales. In January 2025, she succeeded Jen Easterly as the acting CISA director.
