= Deanne Criswell =

American emergency management officer

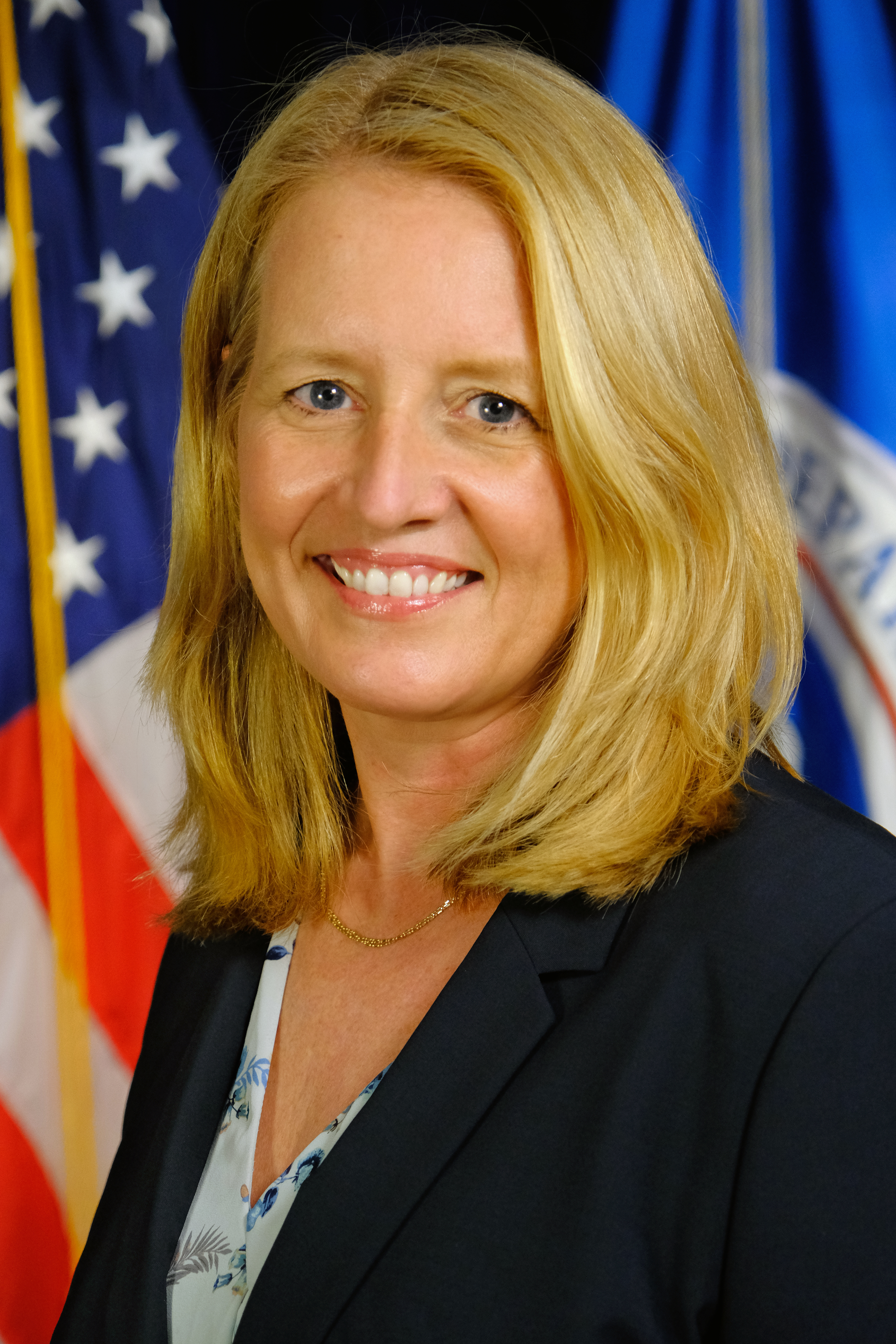
- Official portrait, 2021

Administrator of the Federal Emergency Management Agency
- In office April 26, 2021 – January 20, 2025
- President: Joe Biden
- Deputy: Erik Hooks
- Preceded by: Pete Gaynor
- Succeeded by: Cameron Hamilton

Commissioner of New York City Emergency Management
- In office July 1, 2019 – April 26, 2021
- Mayor: Bill de Blasio
- Preceded by: Joseph Esposito
- Succeeded by: John Scrivani

Personal details
- Education: Colorado State University (BS); University of Colorado, Denver (MPA); Naval Postgraduate School (MS)

Military service
- Allegiance: United States
- Branch/service: United States Air Force
- Years of service: 1992–2013
- Rank: Senior Master Sergeant
- Unit: Colorado Air National Guard - 140th Wing

Deanne Bennett Criswell is an American emergency management officer who served as the administrator of the Federal Emergency Management Agency from 2021 to 2025. Criswell is the first woman to lead FEMA. She was previously the commissioner of the New York City Emergency Management Office.

== Education ==
Criswell attended elementary school in Free Soil, Michigan and graduated in 1984 from Catholic Central High School in Manistee, Michigan. She then earned a Bachelor of Science in technology education from Colorado State University, a Master of Public Administration from the University of Colorado Denver, and a Master of Arts in homeland security from the Naval Postgraduate School.

== Career ==
Criswell served as a member of the Colorado Air National Guard with the 140th Wing and was deployed to Kuwait directly after the September 11, 2001, attacks. She also worked as a firefighter for 21 years. Criswell managed the Office of Emergency Management for the city of Aurora, Colorado. She later worked in the Federal Emergency Management Agency during the Barack Obama administration before becoming the commissioner of the New York City Emergency Management department in 2019.

Her nomination to be the next FEMA administrator was submitted to the United States Senate on February 22, 2021. She was confirmed unanimously on April 22, 2021, by voice vote, and was sworn in by Department of Homeland Security Secretary Alejandro Mayorkas on April 26, 2021.

In the aftermath of Hurricane Helene and Hurricane Milton, Criswell was accused without evidence of deliberately denying relief to disaster victims who were political supporters of President-elect Donald Trump. The attorney general of Florida sued Criswell and other FEMA employees, claiming that political discrimination was widespread in the agency. The lawsuit was dismissed before trial.

Political offices
Preceded by Joseph Esposito	Commissioner of New York City Emergency Management; 2019–2021	Succeeded by John Scrivani
Preceded by Robert J. Fenton; Acting	Administrator of the Federal Emergency Management Agency; 2021–2025	Succeeded by Tony Robinson; Acting
