= Karen Evans =

United States government official

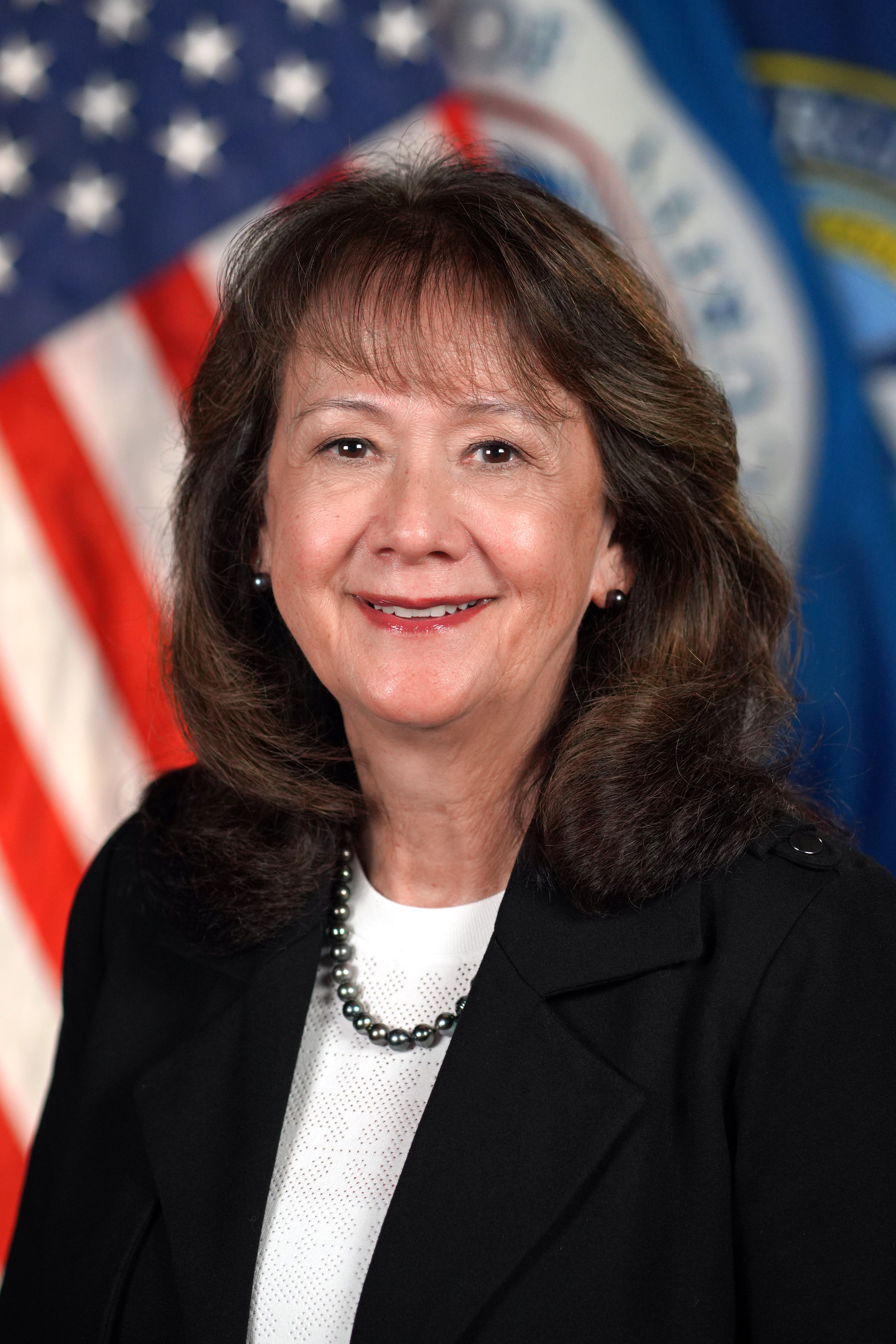

Acting Administrator of the Federal Emergency Management Agency
- In office December 1, 2025 – May 12, 2026
- President: Donald Trump
- Preceded by: David Richardson (acting)
- Succeeded by: Robert J. Fenton (acting)

Assistant Secretary of Energy for Cybersecurity, Energy Security, and Emergency Response
- In office September 4, 2018 – February 14, 2020
- President: Donald Trump
- Preceded by: Position established
- Succeeded by: Sean Plankey (acting)

Personal details
- Party: Republican
- Education: West Virginia University (BS, MA, MBA)

Karen S. Evans is an American government official who served as the acting administrator of the Federal Emergency Management Agency (FEMA) from 2025 to 2026. Evans previously served as a senior advisor at the United States Federal Emergency Management Agency.

She is a former United States Senate confirmed, Presidential Appointed executive, who served as the first Assistant Secretary for Cybersecurity, Energy Security and Emergency Response at the U.S. Department of Energy. An executive who served in four Presidential Appointed positions in three Administrations. She is an elected fellow of the National Academy of Public Administration.

== Education ==
Evans holds a BS in chemistry, an MA in public history, and an MBA from West Virginia University. She additionally received an honorary doctorate from WVU in 2024.

== Career ==
=== Early career ===
Over 20 years in the U.S. government beginning in 1983, Evans worked at the National Park Service, Office of Personnel Management (OPM), and the Department of Agriculture. She was director of the Information Resources Management Division at the Department of Justice before becoming the Chief Information Officer (CIO) of the Energy Department.

In September 2003, Evans was named Administrator of e-government and information technology at the Office of Management and Budget, a post created by the E-Government Act of 2002 and functioning as the de facto Chief information officer of the United States, replacing Mark Forman. In naming Evans a "Power Player" in 2007, NextGov cited Evans' responsibility for a large IT budget and ability to influence government IT for years in the future.

Starting in 2003 she served as the Chief Information Officer for the Department of Energy, and at the director level with both the U.S. Department of Justice and the Farmers Home Administration.

=== First Trump administration ===
In June 2018, President Donald Trump nominated Evans to be the first Assistant Secretary for Office of Cybersecurity, Energy Security, and Emergency Response (CESER) at the Department of Energy. The U.S. Senate approved her nomination by voice vote on August 29. She took up her post in September and served in the role until February 2020, when Secretary Dan Brouillette replaced her with Alexander Gates. Several months later she was named the CIO of the Department of Homeland Security, overseeing the largest civilian IT budget of more than $7 billion.

Evans formerly served as the first Assistant Secretary for Cybersecurity, Energy Security and Emergency Response for the U.S. Department of Energy (DOE). After being confirmed by the United States Senate, she was sworn in on August 28, 2018, and provided strategic direction, leadership and management to address emerging threats while improving energy infrastructure security and supporting the DOE national security mission. From March 2020 − January 20, 2021, Evans served as the Chief Information Officer (CIO) of the U.S. Department of Homeland Security.

Prior to being named Assistant Secretary at DOE, Evans was the national director of the U.S. Cyber Challenge, a public-private partnership focused on building the cyber workforce. She served on the Trump Transition and Landing Teams to develop the management agenda addressing technology initiatives government wide.

Evans served as the Administrator for the Office of Electronic Government and Information Technology at the Office of Management and Budget (OMB) during the George W. Bush administration. At OMB, she oversaw nearly $71 billion in annual IT funds, including implementation of IT throughout the federal government.

As of 2012, Evans was a co-founder of SafeGov, which advised United States government entities on cloud computing.

Evans previously served as the Managing Director of the Cyber Readiness Institute.

=== Second Trump administration ===
After the election of Donald Trump in 2024, Evans was mentioned in the press as a candidate for an under-secretary role at the Department of Homeland Security in the second Trump administration.

Evans was first appointed to be Executive Assistant Director of Cybersecurity at the Cybersecurity and Infrastructure Security Agency after serving as a senior advisor.

She was later nominated to be Under Secretary of Homeland Security for Management. However, her nomination was withdrawn on July 17, 2025. Following this, Evans was moved to the Federal Emergency Management Agency as a senior advisor. On December 1, 2025, she succeeded David Richardson as Senior Official Performing the Duties of Administrator of the Federal Emergency Management Agency.

== Honors and awards ==
Evans is a fellow of the National Academy of Public Administration.

In 2012 Evans was named a distinguished alumna by West Virginia University. In 2024, she was awarded an Honorary Doctor of Business by the same university.

Political offices
Preceded by David Richardson; Acting	Administrator of the Federal Emergency Management Agency; Acting; 2025–2026	Succeeded by Robert J. Fenton; Acting
