= Brandon Wales =

American national security official

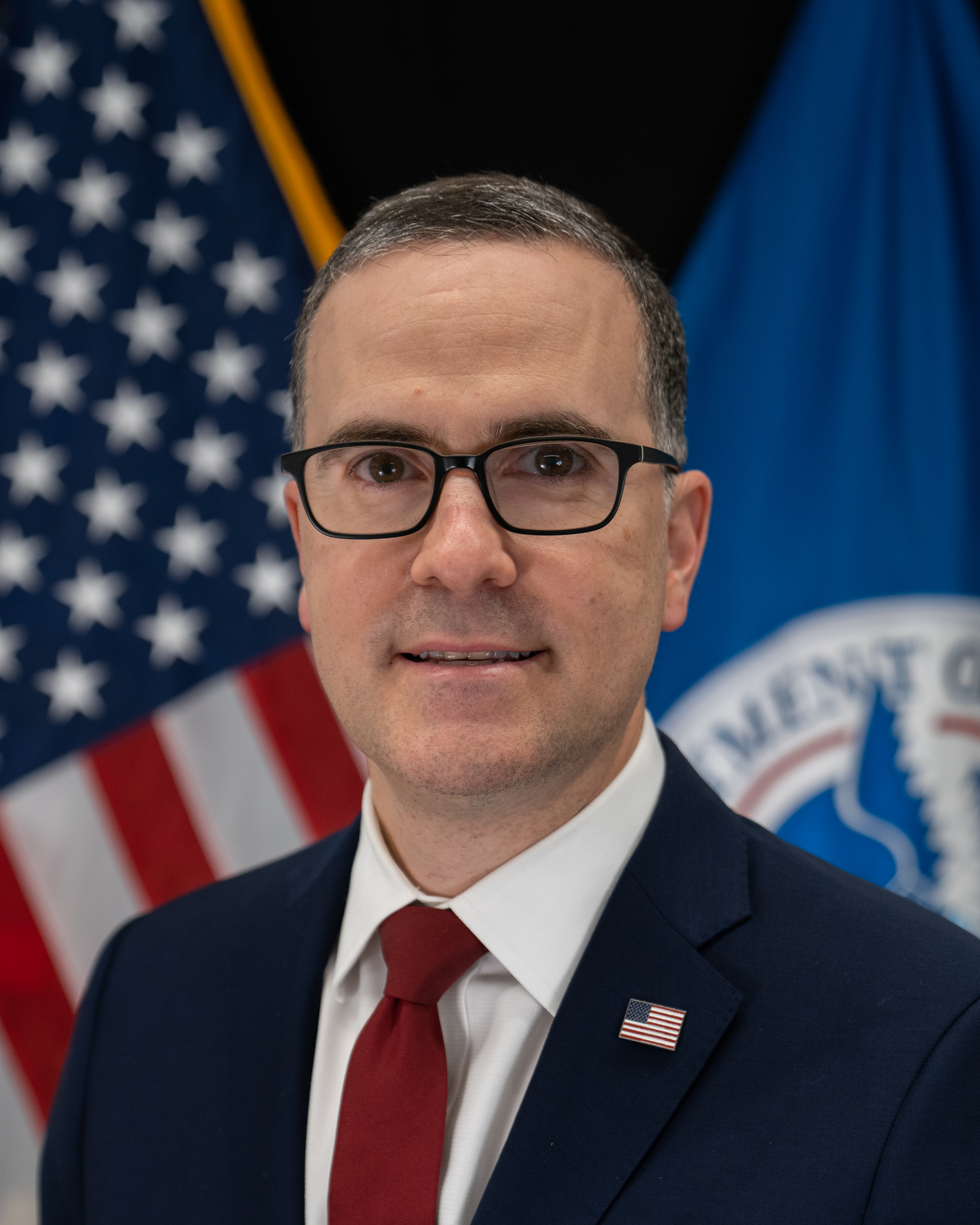
- Official portrait, 2021

Director of the Cybersecurity and Infrastructure Security Agency
- Acting
- In office November 18, 2020 – July 13, 2021
- President: Donald Trump; Joe Biden
- Preceded by: Chris Krebs
- Succeeded by: Jen Easterly

Personal details
- Education: George Washington University (BA); Johns Hopkins University (MA)

Brandon D. Wales is an American national security official who served as the acting director of the Cybersecurity and Infrastructure Security Agency. Wales assumed office after President Donald Trump fired Chris Krebs, and previously served as first executive director of the agency.

== Education ==
Wales earned a bachelor's degree from George Washington University and a Master of Arts degree from Paul H. Nitze School of Advanced International Studies at Johns Hopkins University.

== Career ==
After serving as a national security advisor to Arizona Senator Jon Kyl, he joined the United States Department of Homeland Security in 2005, managing the Homeland Infrastructure Threat and Risk Analysis Center. From August 2017 to January 2019, he served as a senior counselor to then-Secretary Kirstjen Nielsen.

Government offices
Preceded by Chris Krebs	Director of the Cybersecurity and Infrastructure Security Agency; November 18, 2020 - July 13, 2021	Succeeded by Jen Easterly
