= Madhu Gottumukkala =

American engineering executive (born 1976)

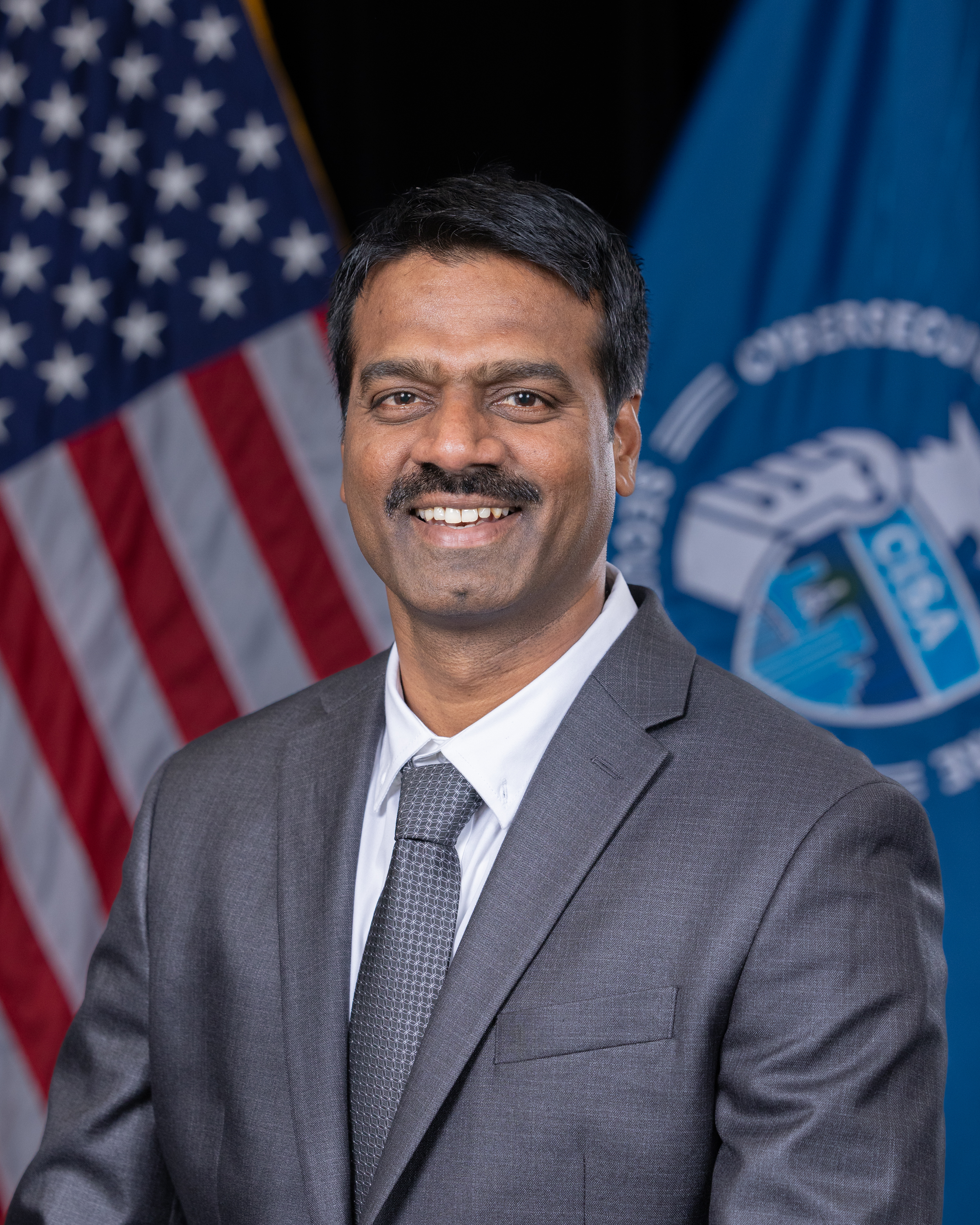
- Official portrait, 2025

Director of the Cybersecurity and Infrastructure Security Agency
- Acting
- In office May 19, 2025 – February 26, 2026
- President: Donald Trump
- Preceded by: Bridget Bean (acting)
- Succeeded by: Nick Andersen (acting)

Deputy Director of the Cybersecurity and Infrastructure Security Agency
- In office May 16, 2025 – February 26, 2026
- Director: Bridget Bean; Himself
- Preceded by: Nitin Natarajan
- Succeeded by: Nick Andersen

Chief Information Officer of South Dakota
- In office September 9, 2024 – May 16, 2025
- Governor: Kristi Noem; Larry Rhoden
- Preceded by: Jeff Clines
- Succeeded by: Mark Wixon

Commissioner of the South Dakota Bureau of Information and Telecommunications
- In office September 9, 2024 – May 16, 2025
- Governor: Kristi Noem; Larry Rhoden
- Preceded by: Jeff Clines
- Succeeded by: Mark Wixon

Chief Technology Officer of South Dakota
- In office August 5, 2024 – September 9, 2024
- Governor: Kristi Noem
- Preceded by: Pat Snow

Personal details
- Born: October 29, 1976 (age 49) Andhra Pradesh, India
- Spouse: Vasantha Gottumukkala
- Education: Andhra University (BE); University of Texas at Arlington (MS); University of Dallas (MBA); Dakota State University (PhD)
- Scientific career
- Fields: Information Systems
- Thesis: Exploring the Interoperability for Information Exchange Between Acute and Post-Acute Care Settings (2023)
- Doctoral advisor: Cherie Noteboom

Madhu Gottumukkala (born October 29, 1976) is an Indian-born American engineering executive who has served as both the acting director and deputy director of the Cybersecurity and Infrastructure Security Agency since May 2025. In February 2026, it was announced that he would be taking on a new role at DHS Office of the Chief Information Officer as director of strategic implementation, a position he held until March 2026.

Gottumukkala served as the chief information officer of South Dakota and the commissioner of the South Dakota Bureau of Information and Telecommunications from September 2024 to May 2025 and as the chief technology officer of South Dakota from August to September 2024.

== Early life and education ==
Madhu Gottumukkala was born in Andhra Pradesh, India, on October 29, 1976. He graduated from Andhra University with a bachelor of engineering in electronics and communication engineering, the University of Texas at Arlington with a master's degree in computer science engineering, the University of Dallas with a Master of Business Administration in engineering and technology management, and Dakota State University with a doctorate in information systems.

== Career ==
=== Private sector work (2000–2024) ===
Gottumukkala began working in information technology for the private sector in 2000, prior to which, he worked at an Indian call center. He later married Vasantha, with whom he had two children. Gottumukkala began working for Sanford Health as its senior director of business solutions in December 2019. In April 2024, he was appointed to the advisory committee of Dakota State University.

=== Government of South Dakota (2024–2025) ===
In August 2024, South Dakota governor Kristi Noem announced that Gottumukkala would serve as the state's chief technology officer; he was sworn in on August 5. The following month, Noem named him as the state's chief information officer and the commissioner of the South Dakota Bureau of Information and Telecommunications. Gottumkkula began serving in both positions on September 9.

=== Acting Director of the Cybersecurity and Infrastructure Security Agency ===
In April 2025, secretary of homeland security Kristi Noem named Gottumukkala as the deputy director of the Cybersecurity and Infrastructure Security Agency; he began serving in the position on May 16. That month, Gottumukkala told personnel at the agency that much of its leadership was resigning and that he would serve as its acting director beginning on May 30. He spoke at the Black Hat Briefings conference on critical infrastructure that August.

In December 2025, Politico reported that Gottumukkala had requested to see access to a controlled access program—an act that would require taking a polygraph—in June. Gottumukkala failed the polygraph in the final weeks of July. The Department of Homeland Security began investigating the circumstances surrounding the polygraph test the following month and suspended six career staffers, telling them that the polygraph did not need to be administered.

In January 2026, Politico reported that over the prior summer, Gottumukkala had uploaded at least 4 documents marked as "for official use only" to a public instance of ChatGPT. While the department was generally blocked from accessing ChatGPT on government networks and devices, Gottumukkala had received special access to the service not available to others at CISA. A routine audit of the prompts Gottumukkala had transmitted to the service detected the violations.

In February 2026, it was announced that he would be taking on a new role at DHS Office of the Chief Information Officer as director of strategic implementation, a job he held until March 2026.
