= Cybersecurity and Infrastructure Security Agency Act =

United States law establishing the Cybersecurity and Infrastructure Security Agency

Cybersecurity and Infrastructure Security Agency Act of 2018
- Enacted by: the 115th United States Congress
- Effective: November 16, 2018

Citations
- Public law: Pub. L. 115–278 (text) (PDF)

Legislative history
- Introduced in the House by Michael McCaul on July 24, 2017; Committee consideration by House Homeland Security, House Energy and Commerce, House Oversight and Government Return, House Transportation and Infrastructure; Passed the House of Representatives on December 11, 2017; Passed the Senate on October 3, 2018 (unanimous consent) with amendment; House of Representatives agreed to Senate amendment on November 13, 2018 (passed); Signed into law by President Donald Trump on November 16, 2018

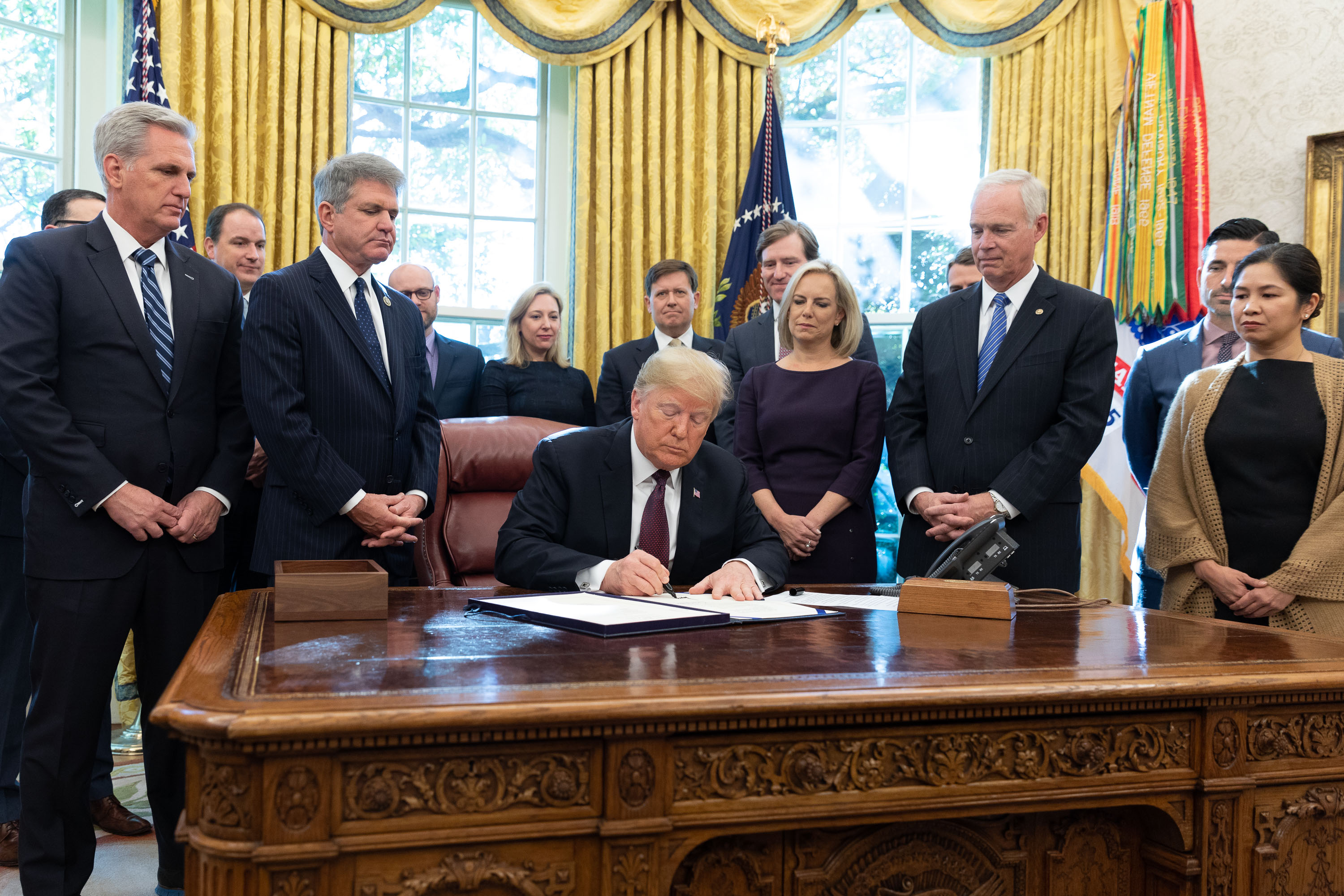
President Trump Signs the Cybersecurity and Infrastructure Security Agency Act into law.

The Cybersecurity and Infrastructure Security Agency Act of 2018 (H.R. 3359, Pub. L. 115–278 (text) (PDF)) was signed by President Donald Trump on November 16, 2018, to establish the Cybersecurity and Infrastructure Security Agency under the Department of Homeland Security. The act was introduced into the United States House of Representatives by Michael McCaul (R-TX-10) on July 24, 2017. It received committee consideration from the House Homeland Security, House Energy and Commerce, House Oversight and Government Return, and House Transportation and Infrastructure, though it was discharged by the Committee on Energy and Commerce, the Committee on Government Oversight and Return, and the Committee on Transportation. It passed the House of Representatives on December 11, 2017, via vocal vote, passed the Senate on October 3, 2018, by unanimous consent, and agreed upon by the House again on November 13, 2018.
