= Nick Andersen =

United States government official

Nicholas Andersen
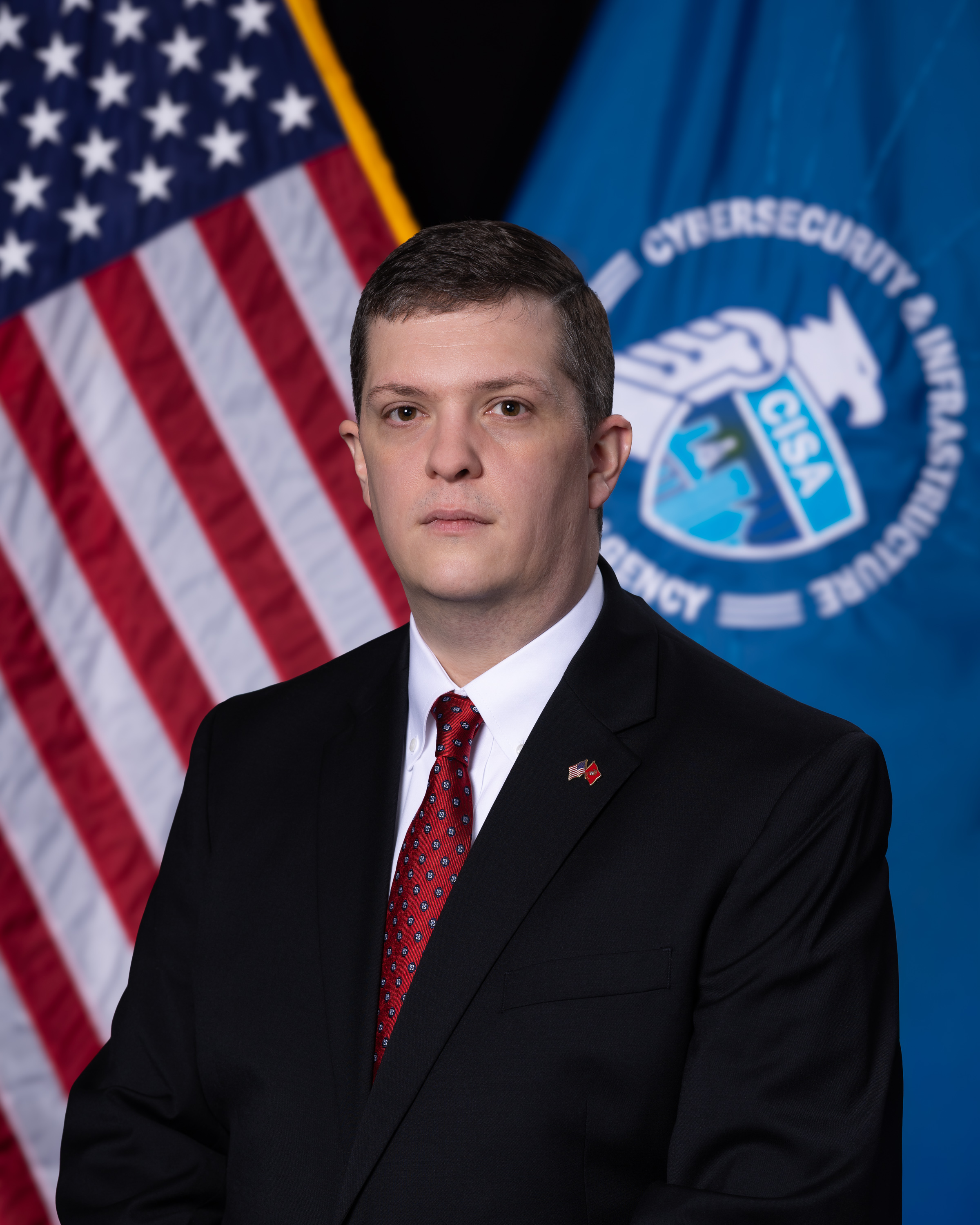

Acting Director of the Cybersecurity and Infrastructure Security Agency
- Incumbent
- Assumed office February 26, 2026
- President: Donald Trump
- Preceded by: Madhu Gottumukkala

Executive Assistant Director for Cybersecurity, Cybersecurity and Infrastructure Security Agency
- In office September 2025 – February 26, 2026
- President: Donald Trump

Assistant Secretary of Energy for Cybersecurity, Energy Security, and Emergency Response
- Acting
- In office October 2020 – January 20, 2021
- President: Donald Trump
- Preceded by: Sean Plankey
- Succeeded by: Puesh Kumar

Personal details
- Party: Republican
- Education: American Military University (BS); Brown University (MS)

Military service
- Branch/service: United States Marine Corps
- Battles/wars: Operation Iraqi Freedom

Nicholas Andersen is an American government official serving as the Acting Director of the Cybersecurity and Infrastructure Security Agency. He previously served as the Principal Deputy Assistant Secretary and performed the duties of the Assistant Secretary for the Office of Cybersecurity, Energy Security, and Emergency Response (CESER) at the U.S. Department of Energy.

== Education ==
Andersen earned a Bachelor of Science degree from American Military University, a Master of Science degree from Western Governors University, a Master of Science degree from Brown University, and an Executive Certificate in Public Policy from the Harvard Kennedy School.

== Career ==
Prior to his role at the Department of Energy, Andersen was the Federal Cybersecurity Lead and Senior Cybersecurity Advisor to the Federal Chief Information Officer at the White House Office of Management and Budget (OMB). In this capacity, he led the OMB Cyber Team and was responsible for government-wide cybersecurity policy development and compliance of shared federal security services.

Andersen also served as the Chief Information Security Officer (CISO) for the State of Vermont, overseeing the state's data security and compliance initiatives. His earlier career includes significant roles in military and intelligence sectors, such as Chief Information Officer for Navy Intelligence and Head of the Office of Intelligence, Surveillance, and Reconnaissance Systems and Technologies at the U.S. Coast Guard. He served on active duty with the U.S. Marine Corps, managing intelligence mission systems in Iraq, Europe, and Africa. He is a veteran of Operation Iraqi Freedom.

In the private sector, Andersen has held leadership positions including Chief Information Security Officer for Public Sector at Lumen Technologies and President/Chief Operating Officer at Invictus International Consulting, LLC. He has also been associated with the Atlantic Council as a nonresident senior fellow with the Cyber Statecraft Initiative.

Andersen was cited as a contributor to A Budget for America's Future - President's Budget FY 2021, an Institute for Critical Infrastructure Technology (ICIT) task force report on mitigating the growing risks associated with IT and cybersecurity consolidation, and the CSIS Commission on Federal Cloud Policy report.

Andersen is a member of the Republican Party and serves on the Republican Party of Virginia's State Central Committee as an elected member from the 11th Congressional District and is appointed by the State Chairman to serve as the State Party's Budget Director.

In September 2025, Andersen was named Executive Assistant Director for Cybersecurity at the Cybersecurity and Infrastructure Security Agency.

In February 2026, Andersen was named acting Director of CISA following the ouster and reassignment of his predecessor, Madhu Gottumukkala.
