= Erik Hooks =

American public safety official (born 1967)

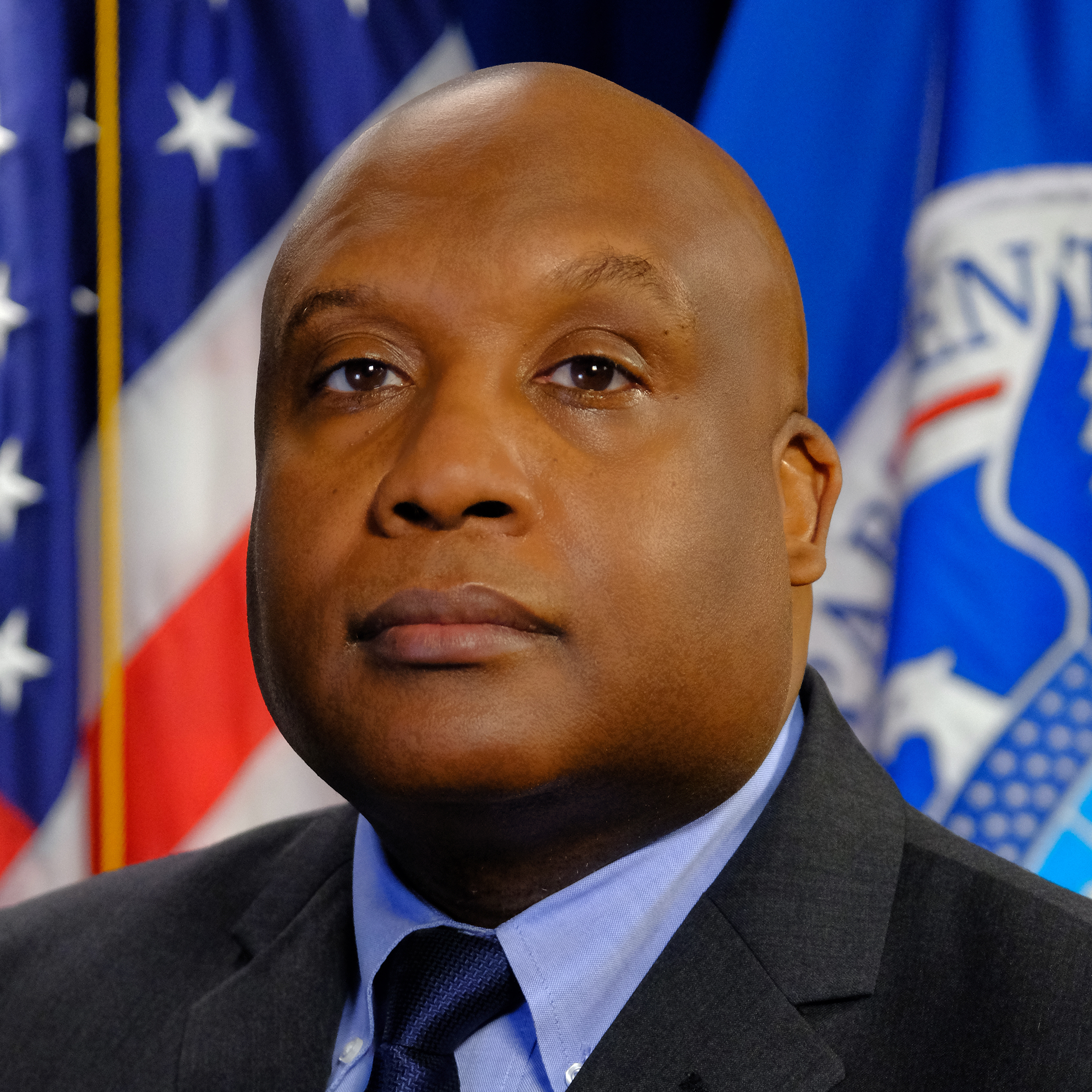

Deputy Administrator of the Federal Emergency Management Agency
- In office December 13, 2021 – January 20, 2025
- President: Joe Biden
- Leader: Deanne Criswell
- Preceded by: Pete Gaynor

Secretary of the North Carolina Department of Public Safety
- In office January 2017 – August 2021
- Governor: Roy Cooper

Personal details
- Born: 1967 (age 58–59) Fayetteville, North Carolina, U.S.
- Education: North Carolina State University (BA, MLS)

Erik Adrian Hooks (born 1967) is an American public safety official who served as the deputy administrator of the Federal Emergency Management Agency. He previously served as secretary of the North Carolina Department of Public Safety from January 2017 to August 2021.

== Early life and education ==
Hooks is a native of Spring Lake, North Carolina. He earned a Bachelor of Arts degree in political science and government and a Master of Liberal Arts from North Carolina State University.

== Career ==
Hooks joined the North Carolina Department of Public Safety in 1989, serving as a special agent with the department until 1999. He later served as assistant special agent in charge of the Special Investigations Division and assistant director. In January 2017, he was appointed to serve as secretary of the department by Governor Roy Cooper. He served until retiring in July 2021.

=== Nomination to FEMA ===
On July 27, 2021, Hooks was nominated by President Joe Biden to be the deputy administrator of FEMA. Hearings were held on Hooks' nomination by the Senate's Homeland Security Committee on November 18, 2021. On December 1, 2021, the committee favorably reported his nomination to the entire Senate floor. Hooks was officially confirmed by the whole Senate via voice vote on December 7, 2021.
