= Chris Krebs =

American cybersecurity and infrastructure security expert (born 1977)

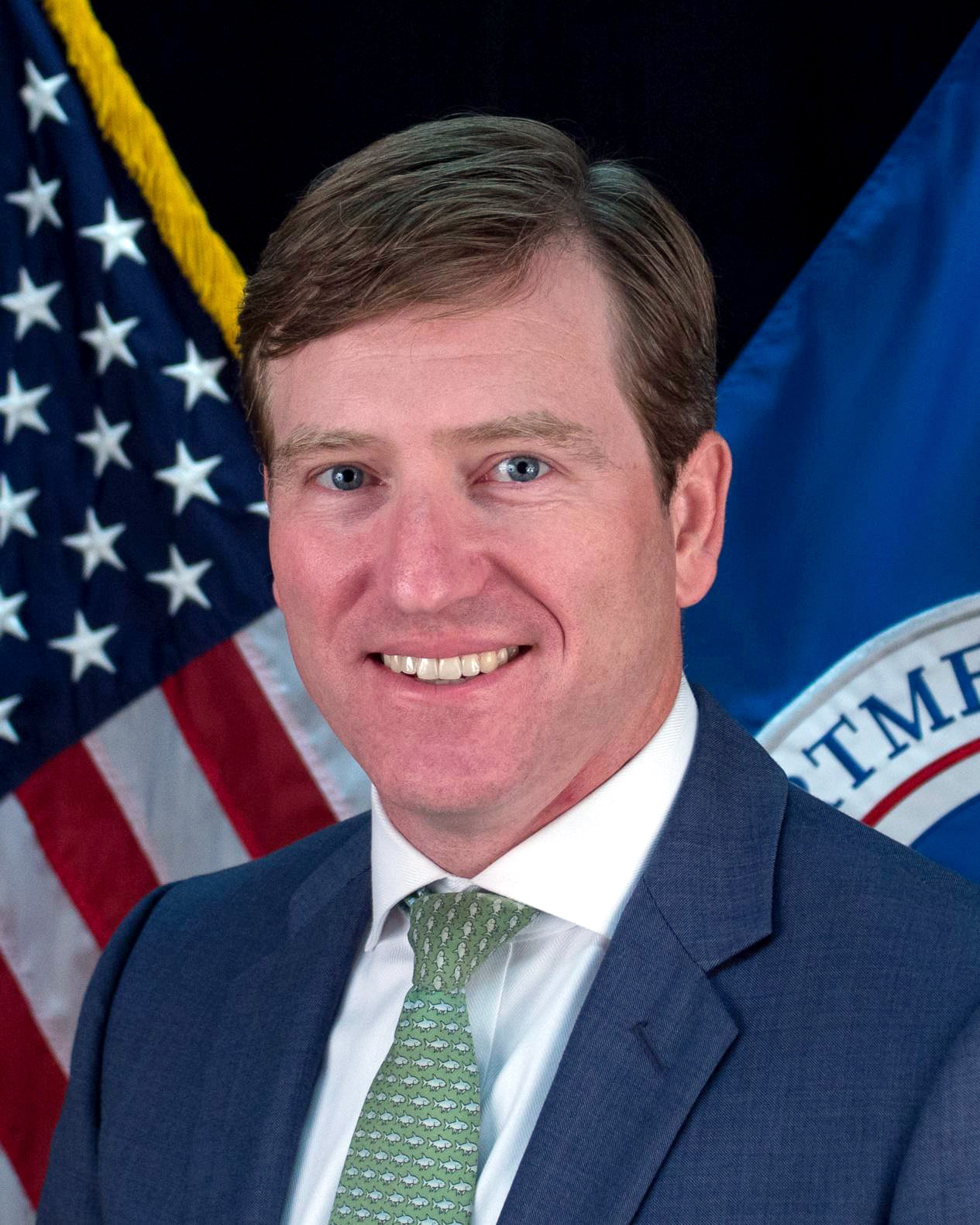
- Official portrait, 2018

1st Director of the Cybersecurity and Infrastructure Security Agency
- In office November 16, 2018 – November 17, 2020
- President: Donald Trump
- Deputy: Matthew Travis
- Preceded by: Position established
- Succeeded by: Brandon Wales (acting)

Under Secretary of Homeland Security for the National Protection and Programs Directorate
- In office June 15, 2018 – November 15, 2018; Acting: July 24, 2017 – June 15, 2018
- President: Donald Trump
- Deputy: Matthew Travis
- Preceded by: Suzanne Spaulding
- Succeeded by: Position abolished

Assistant Secretary of Homeland Security for Infrastructure Protection
- In office August 1, 2017 – June 15, 2018
- President: Donald Trump
- Preceded by: Caitlin Durkovich
- Succeeded by: Brian Harrell

Personal details
- Born: Christopher Cox Krebs; January 30, 1977 (age 49) Atlanta, Georgia, U.S.
- Education: University of Virginia (BA); George Mason University (JD)

Christopher Cox Krebs (born 1977) is an American attorney who served as Director of the Cybersecurity and Infrastructure Security Agency in the United States Department of Homeland Security from November 2018 until November 17, 2020, when President Donald Trump fired Krebs for contradicting Trump's false claims of election fraud in the 2020 presidential election.

== Early life and education ==
Krebs was born in Atlanta, Georgia, in 1977. He received a bachelor's degree in environmental sciences from the University of Virginia in 1999 and a Juris Doctor from the George Mason University School of Law in 2007.

== Career ==
Krebs's professional work has focused on cybersecurity and risk management issues. He served as Senior Advisor to the Assistant Secretary of Homeland Security for Infrastructure Protection, and later worked in the private sector as Director for Cybersecurity Policy for Microsoft.

In March 2017, he became Senior Counselor to the Secretary of Homeland Security. In August 2017, he was appointed Assistant Secretary for Infrastructure Protection. He performed the duties of the Under Secretary of Homeland Security for National Protection and Programs until he was confirmed to that position permanently on June 15, 2018. In November 2018, the National Protection and Programs Directorate was replaced by the Cybersecurity and Infrastructure Security Agency (CISA), and Krebs remained as director of the agency.

In 2019, it was reported that Krebs was being considered to serve as Acting Secretary of Homeland Security after the departure of Kevin McAleenan, although he was reported to be uninterested in the position.

=== 2020 dismissal ===
As CISA's director, Krebs was the "administration's most senior cybersecurity official responsible for securing the presidential election", held on November 3, 2020. Sidney Powell, an attorney for Trump and Michael Flynn, asserted on the Lou Dobbs and Maria Bartiromo Fox News programs that a secret government supercomputer program had switched votes from Trump to Biden in the election, a claim Krebs dismissed as "nonsense" and a "hoax." CISA created a website to debunk election-related disinformation, much of which was being promoted by President Donald Trump and his allies. On November 12, it was reported that Krebs expected to be fired from his position.

On November 17, 2020, Krebs said in a tweet that "59 election security experts all agree, "in every case of which we are aware, these claims (of fraud) either have been unsubstantiated or are technically incoherent." Trump fired Krebs via Twitter the same day, because the "recent statement by Chris Krebs on the security of the 2020 Election was highly inaccurate, in that there were massive improprieties and fraud". Trump provided no evidence of this fraud.

Later that month, a lawyer for the Trump campaign, Joseph diGenova, called for Krebs to be "drawn and quartered. Taken out at dawn and shot". DiGenova's specific criticism was that Krebs "thinks the election went well". Krebs responded to diGenova's tweet in an op-ed in The Washington Post, saying "I am not going to be intimidated by these threats from telling the truth to the American people."

On December 8, 2020, Krebs filed a civil lawsuit against diGenova, the Trump campaign, and Newsmax TV, accusing them of "defamation, intentional infliction of emotional distress, aiding and abetting, and civil conspiracy". He said that he has received "a barrage of threats and harassment" as a result of diGenova's comments and "faces a genuine risk of imminent harm". In April 2021, diGenova apologized to Krebs for his comments.

On January 10, 2021, Krebs suggested that Trump should resign the presidency following the January 6 United States Capitol attack.

=== 2025 investigation ===
On April 9, 2025, during his second presidency, Trump signed an executive order revoking security clearances for Krebs and Miles Taylor, a former chief of staff of the United States Department of Homeland Security, as well as ordering investigations into the work of both men during their time in office. Some of Krebs's former colleagues have said that the Executive Order targeting him is based on a "personal vendetta" and the case has drawn extensive media attention. According to Maggie Haberman and Jonathan Swan of the New York Times, Trump instructed White House to "take a look at" Krebs after he was reminded that Krebs had said that there was no fraud in the 2020 election. On April 30, 2025, Krebs claimed that he had lost his Global Entry status, and that he suspected it was the result of retribution by the Trump administration against him.

=== Private sector career ===
After leaving office, Krebs joined former Facebook CISO Alex Stamos at the beginning of 2021 to form Krebs Stamos Group, a cybersecurity consultancy, which quickly landed its first customer, the recently beleaguered SolarWinds. Krebs Stamos Group was acquired by SentinelOne in late 2023, Krebs remained as the company's chief intelligence and public policy officer. Krebs resigned from SentinelOne in April 2025 citing personal decisions.

==== Council for Responsible Social Media ====
In October 2022, Krebs joined the Council for Responsible Social Media project launched by Issue One to address the negative mental, civic, and public health impacts of social media in the United States co-chaired by former House Democratic Caucus Leader Dick Gephardt and former Massachusetts Lieutenant Governor Kerry Healey.

Government offices
New office	Director of the Cybersecurity and Infrastructure Security Agency; 2018–2020	Succeeded by Brandon Wales
