= Director of the Cybersecurity and Infrastructure Security Agency =

Civilian official in the US Department of Homeland Security

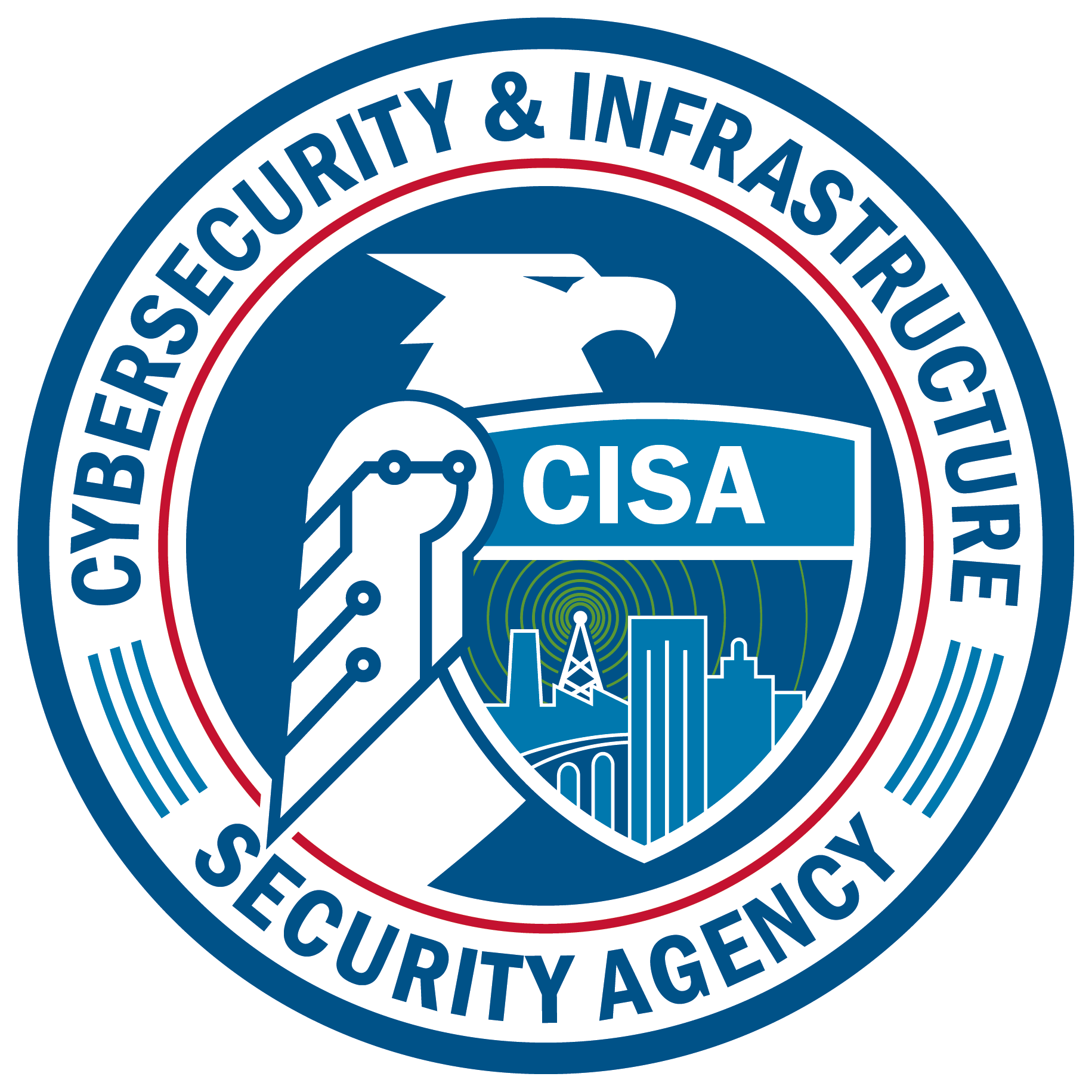

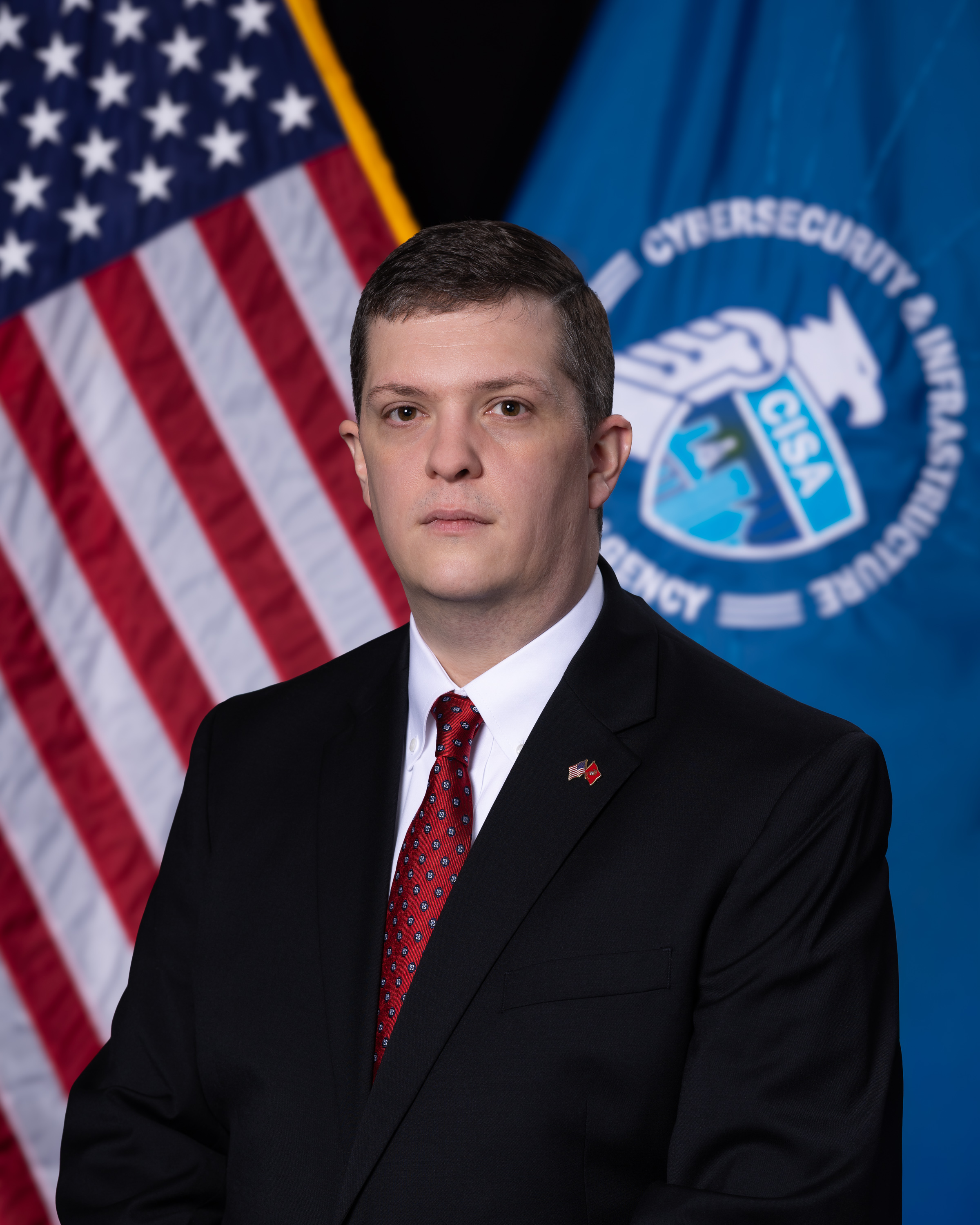
- Incumbent; Nick Andersen; Acting since February 26, 2026
- United States Department of Homeland Security
- Constituting instrument: 6 U.S.C. § 113
- Inaugural holder: Chris Krebs
- Formation: 2018
- Deputy: Nick Andersen
- Website: www.dhs.gov/leadership

The director of the cybersecurity and infrastructure security agency is a high level civilian official in the United States Department of Homeland Security (DHS). The director, as head of the Cybersecurity and Infrastructure Security Agency at DHS, is the principal staff assistant and adviser to both the secretary of homeland security and the deputy secretary of homeland security for all DHS programs designed to reduce the nation's risk to terrorism and natural disasters. The director is appointed from civilian life by the president with the consent of the Senate to serve at the pleasure of the president.

The position was created in November 2018, replacing the position of under secretary of homeland security for national protection and programs.

As of May 2026, a permanent director has yet to be confirmed, although recent reporting has suggested that cybersecurity industry veteran, Tom Parker has been shortlisted to lead the agency. This follows the earlier withdrawal of Sean Plankey, who failed to be confirmed by the Senate after more than a year.

== Overview ==
The director of the cybersecurity and infrastructure security agency is responsible for directing all of the Department of Homeland Security's integrated efforts to reduce the risk of terrorism and natural disasters to the nation's physical, cyber and communications infrastructure.

The director is a Level III position within the Executive Schedule. As of January 2022, the annual rate of pay for Level III is $187,300.

== Directors ==
| # | Image | Name | Took office | Left office | President |
Under Secretary of Homeland Security for National Protection and Programs
| 1 | | Suzanne Spaulding | October 2011 | January 20, 2017 | Barack Obama |
| | | David Hess Senior Official Performing Duties of: Jan 21, 2017 – June 2017 | January 20, 2017 | June 2017 | Donald Trump |
| | | Jeanette Manfra Senior Official Performing Duties of: June 2017 – August 2017 | June 2017 | August 28, 2017 | Donald Trump |
| 2 | | Chris Krebs; Senior Official Performing Duties of: Aug 28, 2017 – June 15, 2018 | August 28, 2017 | November 15, 2018 | Donald Trump |
Director of the Cybersecurity and Infrastructure Security Agency
| 1 | | Chris Krebs | November 16, 2018 | November 17, 2020 | Donald Trump |
| - | | Brandon Wales; Acting | November 18, 2020 | July 13, 2021 | Donald Trump |
| - | | Brandon Wales; Acting | November 18, 2020 | July 13, 2021 | Joe Biden |
| 2 | | Jen Easterly | July 13, 2021 | January 20, 2025 | Joe Biden |
| - | | Bridget Bean; Acting | January 20, 2025 | May 19, 2025 | Donald Trump |
| - | | Madhu Gottumukkala; Acting | May 19, 2025 | February 26, 2026 | Donald Trump |
| - | | Nick Andersen; Acting | February 26, 2026 | Present | Donald Trump |

== Reporting officials ==
Officials reporting to the Director of the CISA include:

- Deputy Director of CISA - Nick Andersen
- Chief Operating Officer - Dr. Ryan Donaghy
- Executive Assistant Director for Cybersecurity (CSD) - Chris Butera (Acting)
- Executive Assistant Director for Infrastructure Security (ISD) - Steve Casapulla
- Executive Assistant Director for Emergency Communications (ECD) - Billy Bob Brown, Jr.
- Assistant Director for National Risk Management Center (NRMC) - Steve Casapulla (Interim)
- Assistant Director for Integrated Operations Division (IOD) - James H. Harrell
- Assistant Director for Stakeholder Engagement Division (SED) - Dr. Ryan Donaghy (Acting)
