= Office of Cybersecurity, Energy Security, and Emergency Response =

US government organization on energy

United States Assistant Secretary of Energy for Cybersecurity, Energy Security, and Emergency Response
- Incumbent; Vacant
- United States Department of Energy
- Abbreviation: CESER
- Reports to: United States Secretary of Energy
- Appointer: The president; with Senate advice and consent
- Term length: Appointed
- Deputy: Principal Deputy Assistant Secretary
- Website: www.energy.gov/ceser/office-cybersecurity-energy-security-and-emergency-response

On February 14, 2018, Rick Perry while serving as the Secretary of Energy established a new Office of Cybersecurity, Energy Security, and Emergency Response (CESER) at the United States Department of Energy (DOE). The CESER office was led by an Assistant Secretary who is responsible for DOE's emergency preparedness and coordinated response to disruptions to the energy sector, including physical and cyber-attacks, natural disasters, and man-made events. On August 28, 2018, Karen Evans was confirmed as the first Assistant Secretary for CESER by the U.S. Senate.

CESER works to address evolving threats to the nation's energy infrastructure. Its primary mission is to ensure the secure and reliable delivery of energy, while also supporting national security objectives through enhanced preparedness, response strategies, and effort to build resilience.

In an early Congressional hearing after the first Assistant Secretary for CESER was confirmed, the challenge faced by the office was outlined as follows: "Our Nation's energy infrastructure has become a primary target for hostile cyber actors, both state-sponsored and private groups. The frequency, scale, and sophistication of cyber threats have increased, and attacks can be much easier to launch. Cyber incidents have the potential to interrupt energy services, damage highly specialized equipment, and threaten human health and safety."

CESER addresses the growing sophistication and frequency of cyber risks that target energy systems. Building on a history of innovation, CESER collaborates with industry partners and DOE National Laboratories to advance research and develop cutting-edge technologies. The office facilitates testing of energy system components and configurations, integrating feedback from private-sector stakeholders. CESER also enhances monitoring and information-sharing capabilities through initiatives like the Cybersecurity Risk Information Sharing Program, aimed at improving the security of information systems and control networks.

Preparedness is a cornerstone of CESER's approach. By working closely with organizations such as the Electricity Subsector Coordinating Council and the Oil and Natural Gas Subsector Coordinating Council, CESER strengthens partnerships between federal, state, and private entities. The office conducts regular exercises, including Clear Path and GridEx, to evaluate emergency response plans, foster collaboration, and identify emerging needs for research and innovation. These efforts aim to improve the energy sector's ability to respond to diverse challenges, from natural disasters to cyber incidents.

In the event of disruptions, CESER serves as a central hub for coordinating efforts among government agencies and energy sector partners. By coordinating resources and expertise, the office supports rapid recovery and mitigates the impact of energy interruptions, helping to safeguard the nation's critical infrastructure.

CESER hosts the annual CyberForce Competition where students compete in an Industrial Control Systems- or Operational Technology-focused cyber defense exercise. Additionally, CESER provides unique value-add programs within the federal cyber ecosystem such as the Cyber Testing for Resilient Industrial Control Systems™ (CyTRICS) program, DOE's cybersecurity vulnerability testing and enumeration program for priority energy system component software and firmware. CyTRICS has exceeded its government goals and has expanded its partner base to include GE Power, Hitachi Energy, Rockwell Automation, Schneider Electric, Schweitzer Engineering Laboratories, and Westinghouse.

In 2021, then-Secretary of Energy Jennifer Granholm reorganized the office to demote it from the role of a Presidentially-appointed, Senate-confirmed Assistant Secretary to a career Senior Executive office director. This move was panned by a bipartisan group of Senators who would go on to formally appeal to her to maintain the leadership of the office at the Assistant Secretary-level. Secretary Granholm also reorganized to place the Strategic Petroleum Reserve under the purview of CESER.

== Structure ==
The Assistant Secretary is supported by four Deputy Directors, each overseeing a different mission area:

- Chief Operating Officer
- Petroleum Reserves
- Preparedness, Policy, and Risk Analysis
- Response and Restoration

Deputy Directors are appointed by the Assistant Secretary. They are considered a part of the DOE Senior Executive Service.

The Assistant Secretary is also supported by a Principal Deputy, or PDAS, who helps manage the day-to-day operations.

== Office holders ==
The table below includes both the various titles of this post over time, as well as all the holders of those offices.

No.	Portrait	Name	Deputy	Took office	Left office	Party	President(s)
1		Karen Evans	Adrienne Lotto (Acting); Sean Plankey; Nicholas Andersen	September 4, 2018	February 14, 2020	Republican	Donald Trump (2017–2021)
–		Sean Plankey (Acting)		February 14, 2020	October 2020	Republican	Donald Trump (2017–2021)
–		Nicholas Andersen (Acting)		October 2020	January 20, 2021	Republican	Donald Trump (2017–2021)
