= Robert J. Fenton =

American response worker

Bob Fenton
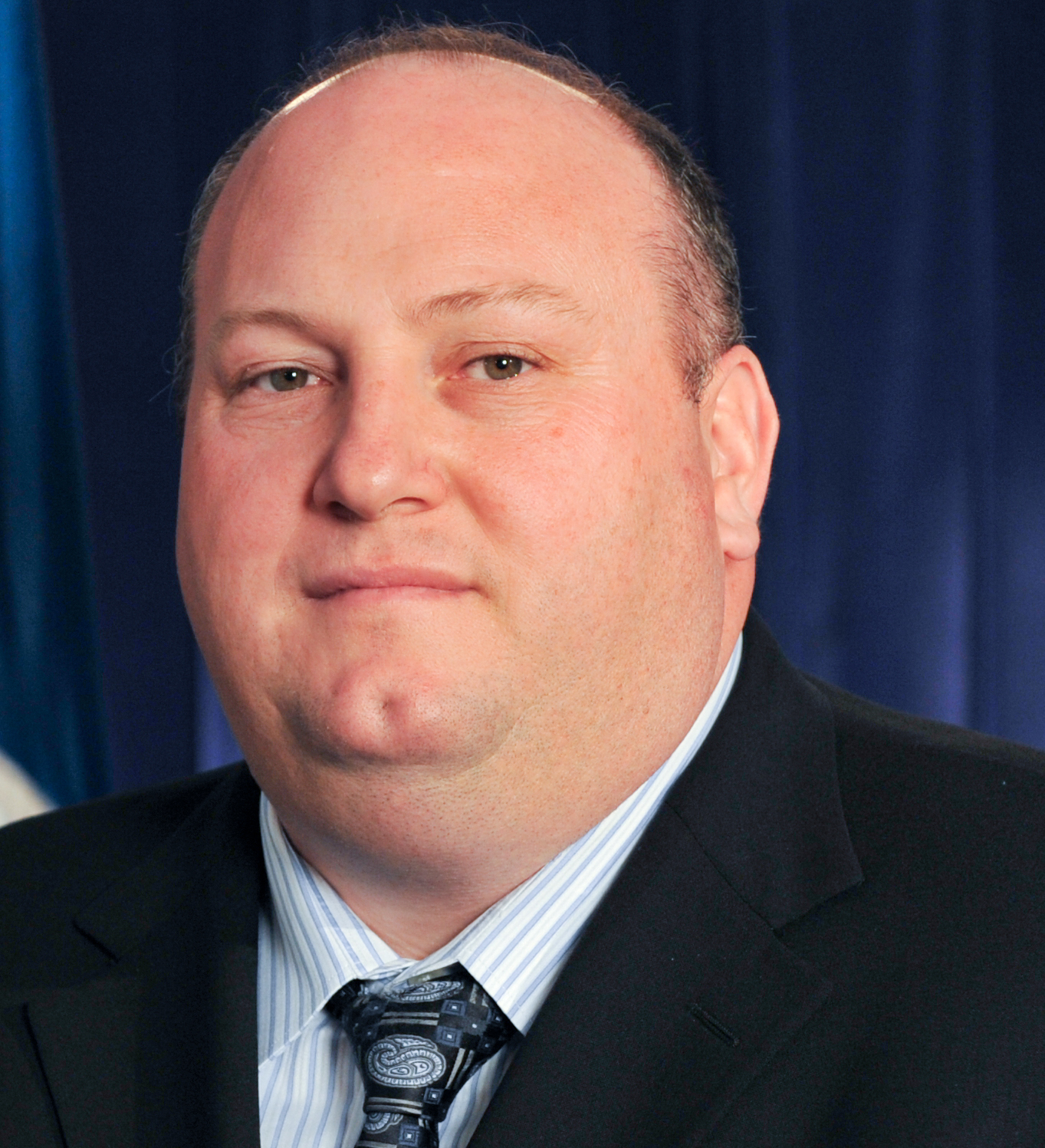

Administrator of the Federal Emergency Management Agency
- Acting
- In office May 12, 2026 – August 10, 2026
- President: Donald Trump
- Preceded by: Karen Evans (acting)
- Succeeded by: Cameron Hamilton
- In office January 12, 2021 – April 26, 2021
- President: Donald Trump; Joe Biden
- Preceded by: Pete Gaynor
- Succeeded by: Deanne Criswell
- In office January 20, 2017 – June 23, 2017
- President: Donald Trump
- Preceded by: Craig Fugate
- Succeeded by: Brock Long

Personal details
- Born: Robert Joseph Fenton Jr.
- Education: University of California, Davis (BA)

Robert Joseph Fenton Jr. is an American response worker who served as the acting administrator of Federal Emergency Management Agency (FEMA) from May 12, 2026 until August 10, 2026. Fenton also served as the acting administrator of FEMA from January to April 2021 and from January 2017 to June 2017.

Fenton began working for FEMA in 1996. He was appointed Regional Administrator for FEMA Region IX: Arizona, California, Hawaii, Nevada, and the Pacific Islands in July 2015. He had a leadership role in the development of the National Incident Management System and the National Response Framework.

He was FEMA's acting administrator under President Donald Trump from January 26, 2017, until his successor Brock Long was confirmed on June 23, 2017. Fenton performed the duties of the FEMA administrator in January 2021, while Pete Gaynor was serving as the acting secretary of homeland security and was succeeded by New York Emergency Department Commissioner Deanne Criswell.

== Career ==
Fenton served as the Chief of Field Operations for Portable Water Supply System, based in Redwood City, California. In that capacity, he deployed to Central Africa as a lead member of the U.S. emergency response relief effort to bring lifesaving assistance to Rwandan refugees.

He then joined FEMA in 1996, where he has worked on large-scale response and recovery operations in the U.S. and has responded to more than 50 Federal disasters, including Hurricane Katrina, the four Florida Hurricanes of 2004, the Southern California Wildfires of 2003 and 2007, the Typhoon Pongsona in Guam, and the 9/11 World Trade Center terrorist attacks.

Fenton next served as the Deputy Associate Administrator in the Office of Response and Recovery at FEMA headquarters and was responsible for coordinating the federal response during major disasters. He coordinated and integrated federal interagency all-hazards disaster planning and response operations; managed emergency response teams; and oversaw disaster emergency communications programs.

From 2006 to 2009, Fenton served in the dual roles of Director of Disaster Assistance and Acting Director of Disaster Operations in the FEMA Region IX Office. Fenton was responsible for the delivery and coordination of all hazards disaster planning, and response and recovery activities in the Region, which serves Arizona, California, Nevada, and Hawaii, as well as Guam, American Samoa, the Mariana Islands, Marshall Islands, and Micronesia. Fenton also served as Chief of the Region IX Response Branch, where he led interagency work groups in the development of the National Incident Management System and the National Response Framework. He was also responsible for conducting interagency training, coordination, and exercises with Federal Emergency Support Function agencies in preparation for disaster response.

Fenton worked at FEMA Headquarters as the Acting Deputy Operations Branch Chief in 2007, leading the development and implementation of the Incident Management Assistance Teams. Fenton transferred to FEMA Headquarters in July 2009 to serve as the Acting Deputy Assistant Administrator for Response, where he was instrumental in crafting the reorganization of the Response Directorate and the Office of Response and Recovery, as well as leading the Response Directorate's focused efforts on whole community catastrophic planning, doctrine development, staff training/credentialing, and exercises.

On May 12, 2026, Robert J. Fenton was appointed to succeed Karen Evans as the acting administrator of FEMA.

Political offices
Preceded by Craig Fugate	Administrator of the Federal Emergency Management Agency; Acting; 2017	Succeeded by Brock Long
Preceded by Pete Gaynor	Administrator of the Federal Emergency Management Agency; Acting; 2021	Succeeded by Deanne Criswell
Preceded by Karen Evans; Acting	Administrator of the Federal Emergency Management Agency; Acting; 2026	Succeeded by Cameron Hamilton
