= David Richardson (government official) =

American government official (born 1965)

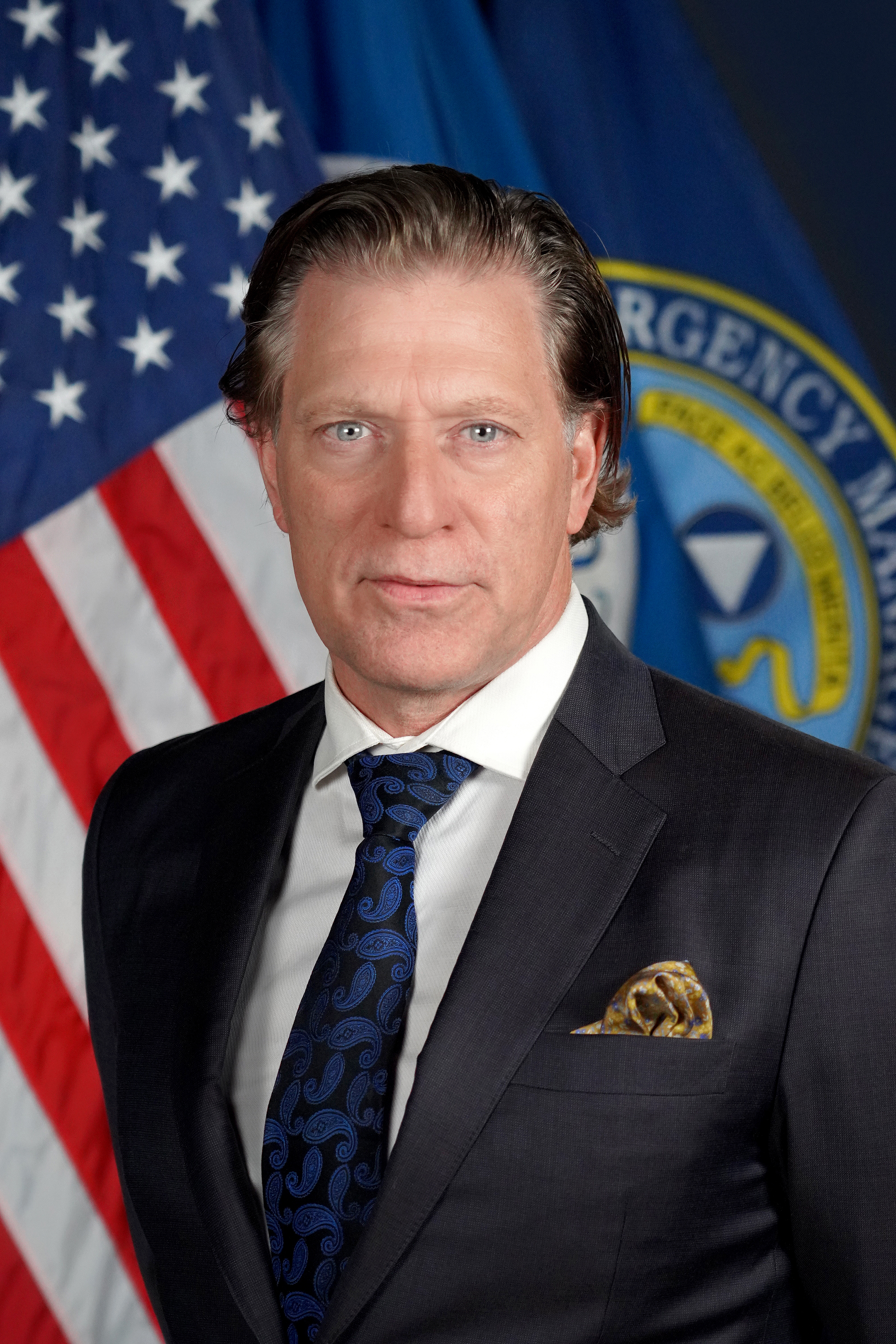
- Official portrait, 2025

Acting Administrator of the Federal Emergency Management Agency
- In office May 8, 2025 – November 30, 2025 (Note: Richardson was the "Senior Official Performing the Duties" as FEMA administrator.)
- President: Donald Trump
- Preceded by: Cameron Hamilton (acting)
- Succeeded by: Karen Evans (acting)

Personal details
- Born: March 4, 1965 (age 61) Waterford, Michigan, U.S.
- Children: 2
- Education: Harding University (BS)
- Website: www.derichardson.com

Military service
- Allegiance: United States
- Branch: United States Marine Corps
- Rank: Lieutenant colonel
- Battles/wars: Afghanistan; Iraq
- Awards: Bronze Star Medal with "V" device

David Richardson (born March 4, 1965) is an American government official who served as the Senior Official Performing the Duties of Administrator of the Federal Emergency Management Agency (FEMA) from May to November 2025. Richardson previously served as the Assistant Secretary for the United States Department of Homeland Security's Countering Weapons of Mass Destruction (CWMD), succeeding Mary Ellen Callahan, from January 2025 until taking the Acting FEMA role. He also previously served as a United States Marine Corps ground combat officer.

== Early life and education ==
David Richardson was raised in Waterford, Michigan. He graduated from Harding University, a private Christian university tied to the Churches of Christ, with a degree in biology.

== Career ==
Richardson is a retired lieutenant colonel and artillery officer with the United States Marine Corps, commanding units in Afghanistan, Iraq, and Africa. In October 2007 he was awarded the Bronze Star Medal with "V" device for heroic achievement as a Marine advisor to an Iraqi battalion in Anbar Province from January to August 2006. He taught history as a Naval ROTC instructor at George Washington University, strategy at the United States Army Field Artillery School, and was an instructor in the Marine Corps Martial Arts Program.

In January 2025, Richardson became the assistant secretary for the Department of Homeland Security's Countering Weapons of Mass Destruction Office. At the time the office was slated for elimination. According to a November 2026 account in RealClearDefense, Richardson convened problem-solving sessions across 17 DHS components and offices. The group produced a recommendation that the president designate illicit fentanyl a weapon of mass destruction, reframing it from a counter-narcotics issue to a chemical-weapon problem under existing federal law. The recommendation reached the secretary’s desk on March 13, 2025, and received no action from DHS headquarters. Richardson provided a hard copy to border czar Tom Homan, who carried it to the president. On December 15, 2025, President Trump signed Executive Order 14367 designating illicit fentanyl and its core precursor chemicals as weapons of mass destruction; the order’s opening characterization of illicit fentanyl as “closer to a chemical weapon than a narcotic” tracked the team’s recommended framing. The account notes that the team recommended the designation even though it would give DHS no new authority or funding, and that the order directed action by the military, State, and Treasury against cartel assets and financial networks.

== Director of FEMA ==
On May 8, 2025, Cameron Hamilton was dismissed as the acting director of the Federal Emergency Management Agency (FEMA) following comments he made advocating for the agency. Richardson was installed as acting director by Homeland Security Secretary Kristi Noem. In a meeting with employees the following day, he stated that he would personally take control of actions at the agency, including handling disaster payments, and that further "cost-sharing with the states" would be implemented.

Richardson's tenure began with memos seeking to identify "redundancies and inefficiencies". The following week, he privately acknowledged that he did not have a plan for the impending Atlantic hurricane season, according to The Wall Street Journal. That month, he was sued by Denver, Chicago, and Pima County, Arizona, over the Trump administration's revocation of FEMA funding. Richardson canceled its four-year strategic plan but sought to retain thousands of on-call employees.

In June, Reuters reported that Richardson had said that he was unaware that the U.S. had a hurricane season. The Department of Homeland Security stated that he was joking. Hours later, The Wall Street Journal reported that Richardson had only recently learned of the Atlantic hurricane season and that the agency was reverting to the previous year's hurricane plan.

Weeks following the Central Texas flooding, Richardson has not made any public or internal statements which FEMA staff say is highly unusual; one anonymous FEMA staffer said that "he has clearly shown a lack of regard in disaster response, and a lack of care for communities that suffer through these disasters." According to CNN, he visited Kerrville on July 12 but refused to answer their questions about FEMA response times; a spokesperson did. In September 2025, The Washington Post reported that key FEMA officials could not reach Richardson for about 24 hours after the flooding, a period in which his approval was needed to move resources under a Department of Homeland Security rule requiring secretary-level sign-off on contracts above $100,000; the paper said the delay hampered rescue efforts. In a September 2026 interview with ABC News, Richardson said it was "not true" that FEMA withheld support from Texas, that FEMA teams were already on the ground, including in Denton, and that the Coast Guard was used for search and rescue. He said he overrode the $100,000 approval rule to send support. He also said he waited to travel to Texas until federal support had been released: "I was going to go to Texas once the check was cashed. I wasn't going to Texas and tell them the check is in the mail. I made sure it was cashed before I went there to see the people of Texas." Writing in RealClearDefense after speaking with Richardson and senior staff, editor David Craig said Richardson took calls from people involved in the relief effort or able to provide support and did not answer a Washington Post reporter's emails during the response, adding that Richardson "did not have time to also be his own public affairs officer." He submitted his resignation on November 17, 2025 and was succeeded by Karen Evans on December 1.

== Artist ==
Richardson is also a professional painter. In 2019, Richardson published War Story, a novel partially written from the perspective of an Iraqi colonel. In 2026 he published Texas Flood, a first-person account of his tenure at FEMA during the July 2025 Central Texas floods.

== Works cited ==
- Aoun Angueira, Gabriella; Santana, Rebecca (May 9, 2025). "'Don't get in my way,' the new acting head of federal disaster agency warns in call with staff". Associated Press.
- Angeline, Barry (November 21, 2026). "How a Dying Agency Turned Fentanyl Into a Weapon of Mass Destruction". RealClearDefense.
- Barr, Luke (May 15, 2025). "FEMA 'not ready' for hurricane season, internal review finds". ABC News.
- Barr, Luke (September 15, 2026). "Former FEMA administrator speaks out about Kristi Noem's downfall, deadly Texas flooding". ABC News.
- Blackwell (July 13, 2025). "Acting FEMA administrator visits Kerrville, declines questions on response times". CNN.
- Cohen (November 17, 2025). "FEMA head resigns. Richardson had been hard to reach during Texas floods". The Washington Post.
- Coop, Griffin (May 9, 2025). "Harding grad at FEMA helm says he'll 'run right over' employees resisting Trump directives". Arkansas Times.
- Craig, David (September 28, 2026). "The Pope of FEMA". RealClearDefense.
- Douglas, Leah; Hesson, Ted; Layne, Nathan (June 2, 2025). "FEMA staff confused after head said he was unaware of US hurricane season, sources say". Reuters.
- Flavelle, Christopher (May 8, 2025). "Leader of FEMA Is Dismissed as Trump Administration Takes Aim at the Agency". The New York Times.
- Flavelle, Christopher; Friedman, Lisa (June 2, 2025). "Acting FEMA Chief Told Staff He Didn't Know About U.S. Hurricane Season". The New York Times.
- Frank, Thomas (May 8, 2025). "Fired FEMA chief threatened to quit weeks ago". Politico.
- Frank, Thomas (May 9, 2025). "'I alone will speak on behalf of FEMA,' new agency chief tells staff". Politico.
- Frank, Thomas (July 10, 2025). "FEMA leader is a no-show after deadly Texas flooding". Politico.
- Hernandez, Esteban (May 16, 2025). "Denver files lawsuit against Trump administration over rescinded FEMA funding". Axios.
- Kabas, Marisa (July 9, 2025). "Have you seen this man?". The Handbasket.
- Patterson, Scott; Parti, Tarini; Dawsey, Josh (May 15, 2025). "FEMA Head Admits in Internal Meetings He Doesn't Yet Have a Plan for Hurricane Season". The Wall Street Journal.
- Patterson, Scott; Parti, Tarini (June 2, 2025). "FEMA Scraps New Hurricane Plan and Reverts to Last Year's". The Wall Street Journal.
- Richardson, David (November 19, 2026). "We Told Washington to Treat Illicit Fentanyl As a National Security Threat. Now Show Us the Results". Townhall.
- Sacks, Brianna (September 24, 2025). "As Texas flooded, key staff say FEMA's leader could not be reached". The Washington Post.
- Sganga, Nicole (May 9, 2025). "New FEMA head tells staff: "Don't get in my way… I will run right over you"". CBS News.
- Soboroff, Jacob; Ainsley, Julia; Strickler, Laura (May 29, 2025). "Inside the scramble to keep FEMA alive ahead of hurricane season". NBC News.
- Spring, Jake; Dennis, Brady (May 8, 2025). "Head of FEMA removed after saying the agency should not be abolished". The Washington Post.
- Taft, Molly; Elliott, Vittoria (May 21, 2025). "FEMA Has Canceled Its 4-Year Strategic Plan Ahead of Hurricane Season". Wired.
- "Designating Fentanyl as a Weapon of Mass Destruction". The White House. December 15, 2025.

Political offices
Preceded by Cameron Hamilton; Acting	Administrator of the Federal Emergency Management Agency; Acting; 2025	Succeeded by Karen Evans; Acting
