= Brock Long =

American emergency manager (born 1975)

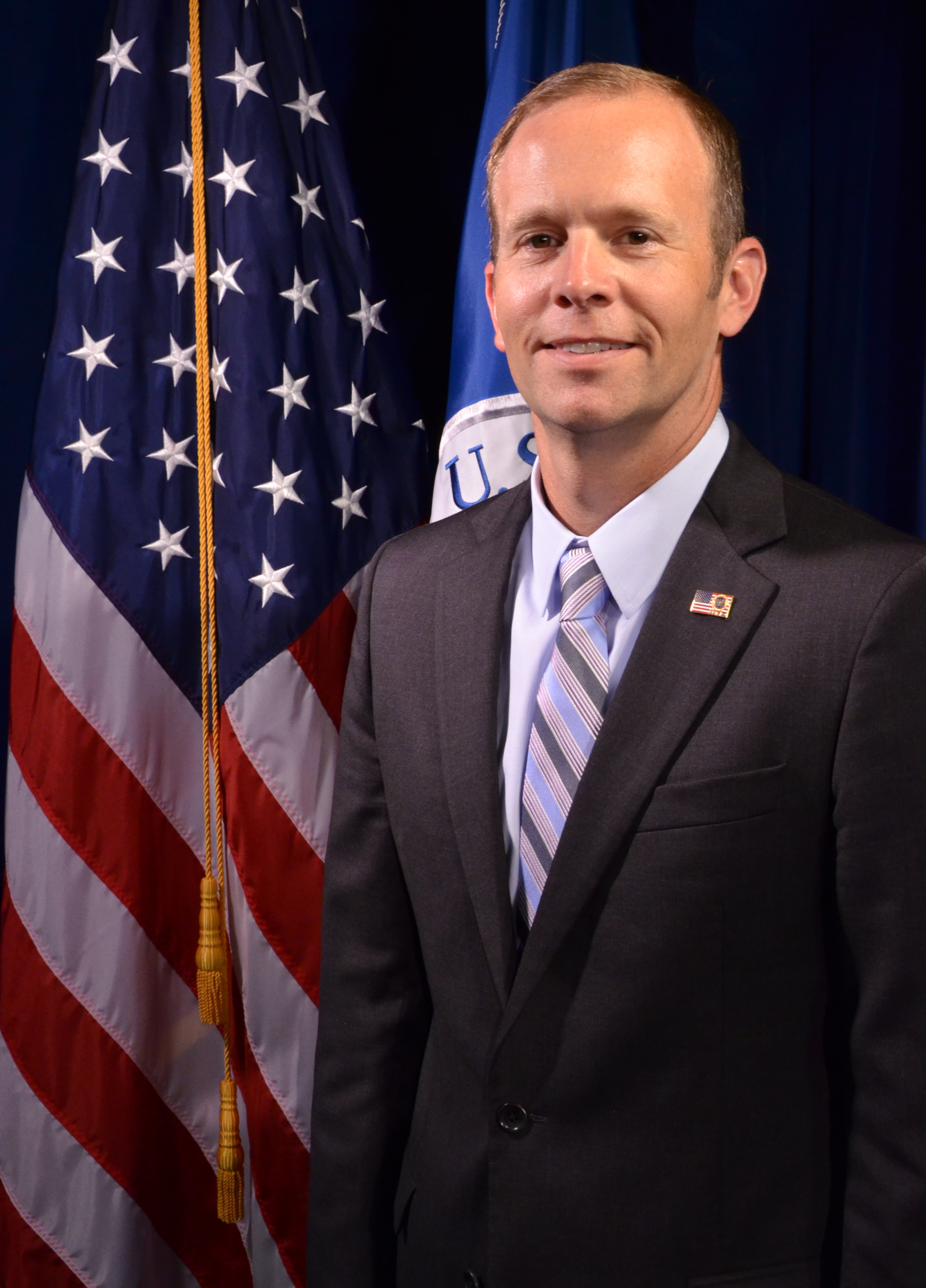

Administrator of the Federal Emergency Management Agency
- In office June 23, 2017 – March 8, 2019
- President: Donald Trump
- Preceded by: Robert J. Fenton (acting)
- Succeeded by: Pete Gaynor

Personal details
- Born: William Brockmann Long; April 6, 1975 (age 51) Newton, North Carolina, U.S.
- Education: Appalachian State University (BS, MPA)

William Brockmann Long (born April 6, 1975) is an American emergency manager who served as the Administrator of the Federal Emergency Management Agency (FEMA). He was appointed to the position by President Donald Trump in April 2017 and confirmed by the United States Senate in June 2017. He served until his resignation in March 2019, following criticism of his handling of the Hurricane Maria and an ethical complaint over using official vehicles.

== Education ==
Long grew up in Newton, North Carolina, graduating from Newton-Conover High School. He received his B.S. in criminal justice and M.P.A. from Appalachian State University. He also graduated from the Naval Postgraduate School's Executive Leadership Program at the Center for Homeland Defense and Security.

== Career ==
Long was an emergency management official in Georgia, where he served as the Statewide Planner/School Safety Coordinator for the Georgia Emergency Management Agency from September 1999 to November 2001. He worked for the Federal Emergency Management Agency as Hurricane Program Manager from November 2001 to January 2006. Long was the Southeast Regional Director for Beck Disaster Recovery from February 2007 to February 2008.

Long headed the Alabama Emergency Management Agency from 2008 to 2011 under Governor Bob Riley and developed the state's response to the H1N1 influenza. During the Deepwater Horizon oil spill, he was the State Incident Commander for the Alabama Unified Command.

In 2011, Long joined the emergency management consulting firm Hagerty Consulting, where he was executive vice president.

=== FEMA Administrator ===
Long speaks in Baton Rouge in May 2018

President Donald Trump nominated Long to be administrator of the Federal Emergency Management Agency on April 28, 2017. On June 20, 2017, he was confirmed by the United States Senate with a vote of 95 to 4.

In August 2017, Long faced the first major natural disaster of his tenure in the form of Hurricane Harvey. He stated that the hurricane would likely be recorded for Texas as "the worst disaster the state's seen," with the recovery period expected to take "many years." Weeks before, he had told interviewers that his biggest concern was major hurricane preparedness. Long received widespread praise for his handling of the federal response to Hurricane Harvey. He was also criticized for his response to Hurricane Maria.

In September 2018, Politico reported that Long was under investigation by the FEMA inspector general because he allegedly used government vehicles to commute between Washington, D.C., and his home in Hickory, North Carolina. Politico reported that Homeland Security Secretary Kirstjen Nielsen, concerned about Long's frequent absences from Washington due to his regular six-hour drives between Washington and Hickory, asked Long to consider resigning his position, which Long declined to do.

In February 2019, Long announced his resignation as FEMA Administrator, effective March 8, following questions over his use of his government vehicle. His deputy, Peter Gaynor, succeeded him as acting administrator.

=== Post-FEMA ===
Brock returned to Hagerty Consulting as an executive chairman in April 2019.

Political offices
Preceded by Robert J. Fenton; Acting	Administrator of the Federal Emergency Management Agency; 2017–2019	Succeeded by Pete Gaynor
