= Jen Easterly =

American government official

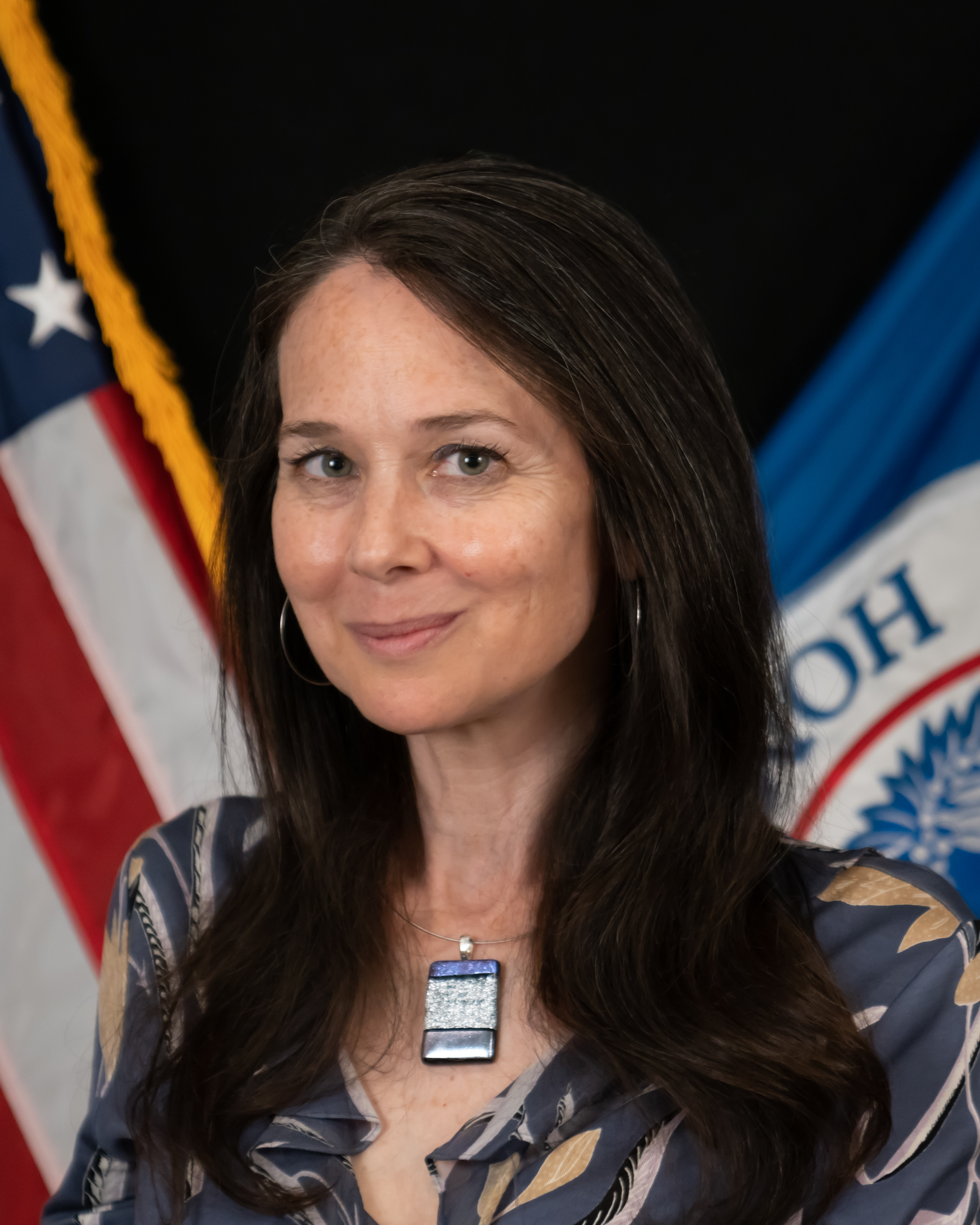
- Official portrait, 2021

2nd Director of the Cybersecurity and Infrastructure Security Agency
- In office July 13, 2021 – January 20, 2025
- President: Joe Biden
- Preceded by: Chris Krebs
- Succeeded by: Bridget Bean (acting)

Personal details
- Born: Jennie Margaret Koch
- Spouse: Jason Tighe Easterly (m. 2004)
- Children: 1
- Education: United States Military Academy (BS); Pembroke College, Oxford (MA)

Military service
- Allegiance: United States
- Branch/service: United States Army
- Years of service: 1990–2010
- Rank: Lieutenant Colonel (United States)

Jen Easterly is an American cybersecurity expert and former government official who served as the Director of the Cybersecurity and Infrastructure Security Agency in the Biden administration. She was confirmed by a voice vote in the Senate on July 12, 2021.

== Early life and education ==
The daughter of a Vietnam War veteran, Easterly was raised in Potomac, Maryland and attended Winston Churchill High School and graduated as valedictorian in 1986. She earned a bachelor's degree from the United States Military Academy in 1990 and a Master of Arts in politics, philosophy, and economics from Pembroke College, Oxford, where she studied as a Rhodes Scholar.

== Army career ==
Easterly served in the United States Army for twenty years and was an assistant professor of social sciences at the United States Military Academy. She was approved for promotion to major in 2000, lieutenant colonel in 2006 and colonel in 2012.

From 2002 to 2004, she was executive assistant to Condoleezza Rice, the National Security advisor during the George W. Bush administration. From 2004 to 2006, she was a battalion executive officer and brigade operations officer in the 704th Military Intelligence Brigade, a subordinate unit of the United States Army Intelligence and Security Command. Easterly was deployed to Baghdad as chief of the cryptologic services group for the National Security Agency. She also worked for NSA's elite Tailored Access Operations.

From 2009 to 2010, Easterly served on the United States Cyber Command, which she helped establish. From 2010 to 2011, Easterly was a cyber advisor for the NSA stationed in Kabul. After retiring from the Army as a lieutenant colonel, she served as deputy director of the NSA for counterterrorism from May 2011 to October 2013.

== Post-Army career ==
From October 2013 to February 2016, Easterly was a special assistant to President Barack Obama and senior director for counterterrorism on the National Security Council. After the end of the Obama administration, Easterly joined Morgan Stanley as global head of the company's cybersecurity division.

== Director of the Cybersecurity and Infrastructure Security Agency ==
In April 2021, President Joe Biden nominated Easterly to serve as the second Director of the Cybersecurity and Infrastructure Security Agency. An uncontroversial nominee, Easterly received general praise for her qualifications from senators and media outlets. She was confirmed by voice vote after being temporarily held up for outside reasons. Easterly was sworn into office on July 13, 2021.

As director, Easterly argued that U.S. intelligence sharing efforts with Ukrainian government officials ahead of the 2022 Russian invasion should be a model for combating China-based hacking groups. In 2023, Easterly stated that potential cybersecurity threats posed by artificial intelligence (AI) development meant that the government should implement systemic safeguards.

In 2023, while Easterly led CISA, it came under significant scrutiny for censorship work from members of Congress who claimed CISA was involved in an attempted cover up. The Republican-led House Judiciary Committee and the Select Subcommittee on the Weaponization of the Federal Government accused CISA of colluding with big tech companies and disinformation partners to censor Americans. The House Republican claims have come under scrutiny as "attempts to distort the truth for political gain".

Easterly stepped down from her position on January 20, 2025.

== Post-CISA Career ==
On July 30, 2025, Easterly was appointed to the Robert F. McDermott Distinguished Chair in the Department of Social Sciences at West Point. Later that day, after far-right activist Laura Loomer criticized the appointment, Secretary of the Army Daniel Driscoll rescinded the service agreement and ordered a review of the hiring practices.

== Awards ==
- Bronze Star (multiple awards)
- 2018 James W. Foley Legacy Foundation American Hostage Freedom Award

== Personal life ==
Easterly is the daughter of Noel Clinton Koch and June Quint Koch. She married attorney Jason Tighe Easterly in Potomac, Maryland on April 3, 2004. They have a son. Judge Catharine Easterly of the District of Columbia Court of Appeals is her sister-in-law.
