= Matthew Travis =

American businessman & government official

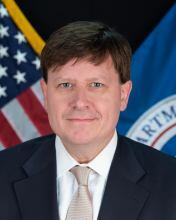

Deputy Director of the Cybersecurity and Infrastructure Security Agency
- In office November 16, 2018 – November 17, 2020
- President: Donald Trump
- Preceded by: Office established
- Succeeded by: Nitin Natarajan

Personal details
- Born: Terre Haute, Indiana
- Education: University of Notre Dame; Georgetown University

Matthew Travis is a businessman and former American government official. He served as the Deputy Director for the Department of Homeland Security's Cybersecurity and Infrastructure Security Agency (CISA). Travis served as Deputy Under Secretary for the National Protection and Programs Directorate (NPPD) before the agency became CISA on November 16, 2018.

== Career ==
Travis graduated from the University of Notre Dame and joined the U.S. Navy in 1991 as an active duty officer. Travis served aboard the guided-missile frigate U.S.S. CARR (FFG 52) as the Engineering Auxiliaries Officer as well as the maritime interdiction boarding officer in the Northern Red Sea following Operation Desert Storm.

Upon leaving military service in 1998, Travis began a career in government consulting. He built the Homeland Security team at DFI before its merger with Detica and following the firm's acquisition by BAE Systems. In 2010, Travis co-founded Obsidian Analysis, a homeland security consulting firm, which was acquired by Cadmus in 2016.

Travis joined the Trump Administration as Deputy Under Secretary for DHS' NPPD in March 2018. In November 2018, Congress passed the Cybersecurity and Infrastructure Security Agency Act of 2018, creating CISA as a component of DHS and elevating NPPD into CISA. Travis served as the Deputy Director of that new agency, until the White House pressured him to resign on November 17, 2020.

Government offices
| Preceded by Position Established | Deputy Director of the Cybersecurity and Infrastructure Security Agency; November 16, 2018-November 17, 2020 | Succeeded by Nitin Natarajan |
