= Pete Gaynor =

American government official (born 1958)

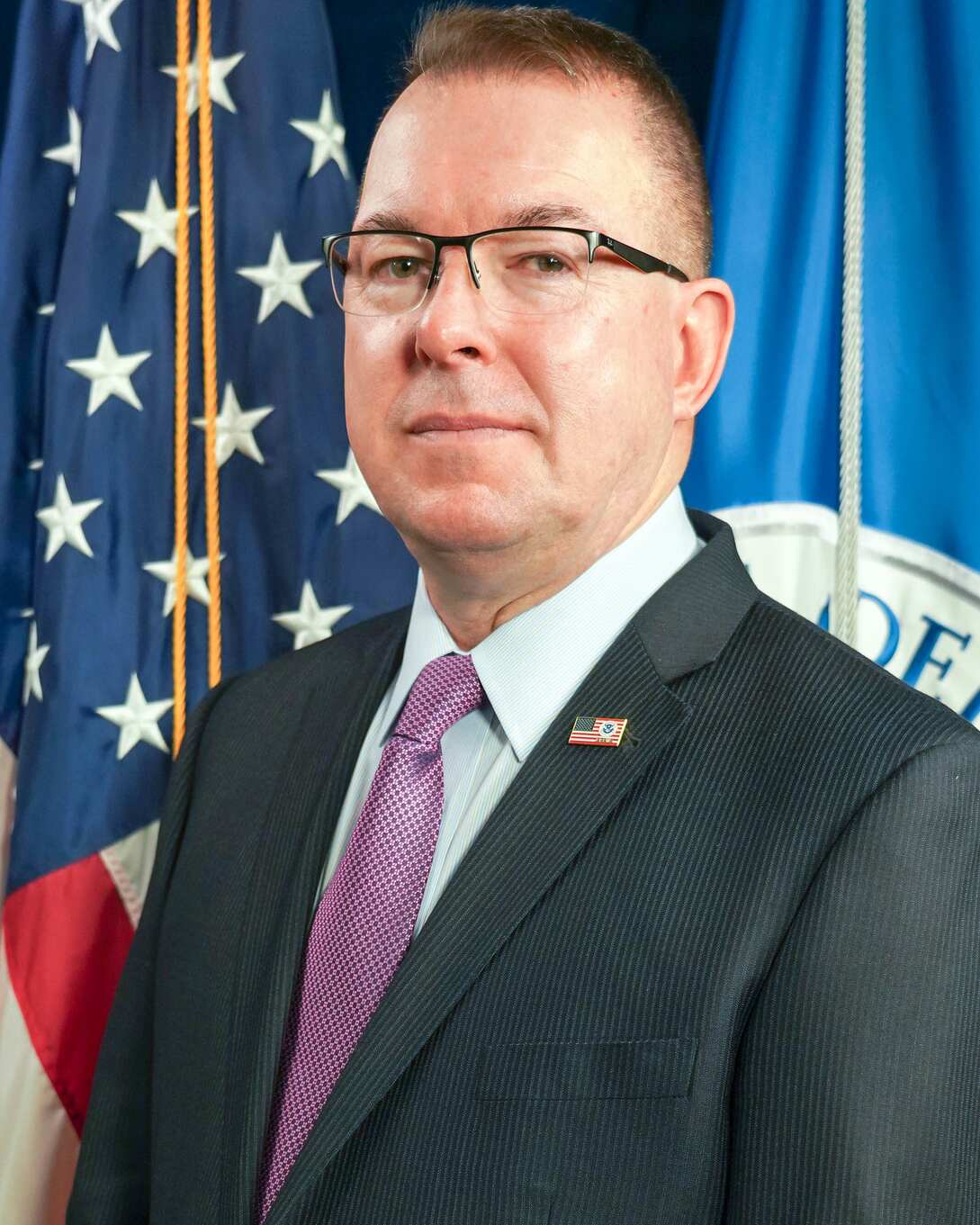
- Official portrait, 2020

Acting United States Secretary of Homeland Security
- In office January 12, 2021 – January 20, 2021
- President: Donald Trump
- Deputy: Ken Cuccinelli (acting)
- Preceded by: Chad Wolf (acting)
- Succeeded by: David Pekoske (acting)

Administrator of the Federal Emergency Management Agency
- In office March 8, 2019 – January 12, 2021; Acting: March 8, 2019 – January 16, 2020
- President: Donald Trump
- Preceded by: Brock Long
- Succeeded by: Robert J. Fenton (acting)

Deputy Administrator of the Federal Emergency Management Agency
- In office October 11, 2018 – January 16, 2020
- President: Donald Trump
- Preceded by: Daniel Kaniewski (acting)
- Succeeded by: Erik Hooks

Personal details
- Born: Peter Thomas Gaynor; 1958 (age 67–68) Warwick, Rhode Island, U.S.
- Education: Community College of Rhode Island (attended); Rhode Island College (BA); Naval War College (MA)

Military service
- Allegiance: United States
- Branch/service: United States Marine Corps
- Years of service: 1977–2007
- Rank: Lieutenant Colonel

Peter Thomas Gaynor (born 1958) is an American emergency manager who served briefly as acting Secretary of Homeland Security under President Trump. Gaynor previously served as administrator of the Federal Emergency Management Agency (FEMA). He was appointed as Acting Administrator by President Donald Trump on March 8, 2019, and became Administrator on January 16, 2020.

Gaynor was Acting Secretary of Homeland Security from January 12, 2021, upon the resignation of Chad Wolf, until President Biden's inauguration on January 20, 2021.

== Early life and education ==
Gaynor, who grew up in Warwick, Rhode Island, graduated from Pilgrim High School in 1977, and subsequently enlisted in the Marine Corps. He later attended Community College of Rhode Island from 1982 to 1984, and Rhode Island College from 1984 to 1986, graduating with a B.A. in History. While in the Marines, he earned a M.A. in National Security and Strategic Studies from the U.S. Naval War College in 2001. He completed the Executive Leaders Program at the Naval Postgraduate School in 2013.

== Career ==
Gaynor served in the U.S. Marine Corps for 26 years, retiring with the rank of lieutenant colonel. He was the executive officer responsible for the security of Camp David; was the head of Plans, Policy, and Operations at the Headquarters, Marine Corps, during the September 11 attacks; and deployed with the 1st Marine Expeditionary Force where he coordinated combat operations in Al Anbar Province, Iraq, for multinational and Marine forces.

From March 2008 to December 2014, Gaynor was the director of the Providence Emergency Management Agency and Office of Homeland Security. A colleague there describes him as being prepared for anything and respectful of the chain of command because of his military experience.

From January 2015 to October 2018, Gaynor was the director of the Rhode Island Emergency Management Agency (RIEMA). During that time, RIEMA responded to numerous small and large disasters, including one presidentially declared disaster and at least seven pre-existing active federal disasters. Gaynor oversaw response and recovery efforts to blizzards, floods, tropical storms and public health emergencies. He also coordinated evacuations, mass care, special events, and school safety.

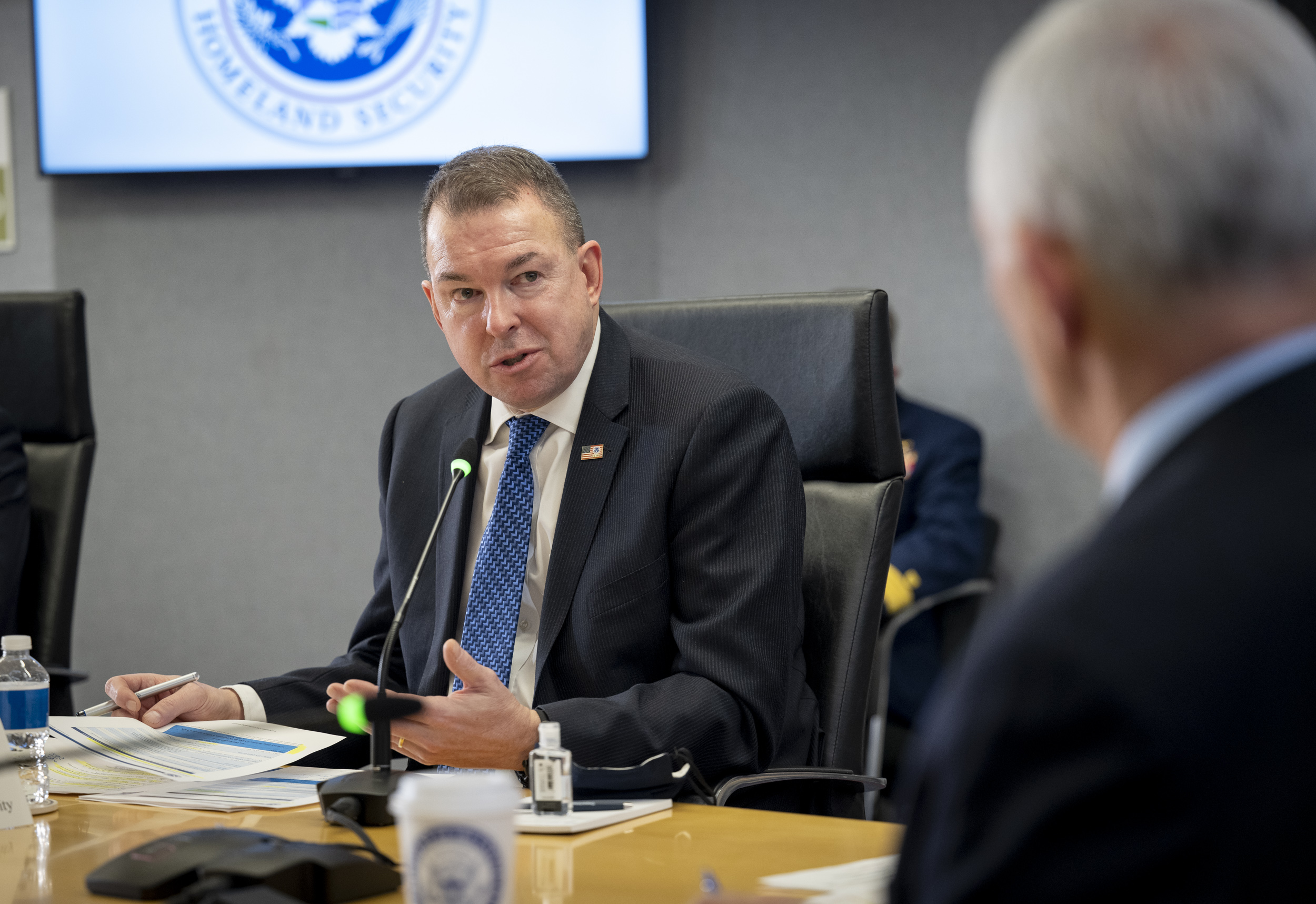
Gaynor participates in a brief on Inauguration Security with Vice President Pence in Washington D.C.

Gaynor was confirmed by the Senate on October 11, 2018, as the deputy administrator of the Federal Emergency Management Agency (FEMA).

On March 8, 2019, when administrator Brock Long resigned amid controversy, Gaynor became acting administrator. Gaynor was in charge of the agency's recovery efforts for many disasters, including the California wildfires, tornado outbreaks, severe storms, flooding in the Midwest and the Puerto Rico earthquakes. On January 14, 2020, the Senate confirmed Gaynor as administrator with a vote of 81 to 8. He was sworn in two days later.

With the resignation of Chad Wolf, Gaynor became the acting Secretary of Homeland Security on January 12, 2021. (Note: Wolf's tenure was ruled unlawful by a number of court rulings, with the first being on 11 September 2020.)

In 2025, Gaynor became president of disaster recovery company Bright Harbor.

== Notes ==
Political offices
Preceded by Brock Long	Administrator of the Federal Emergency Management Agency; 2019–2021; Acting: 2019–2020	Succeeded by Robert J. Fenton; Acting
Preceded by Chad Wolf; Acting	United States Secretary of Homeland Security; Acting; 2021	Succeeded by David Pekoske; Acting
