= Cameron Hamilton =

American government official (born 1986)

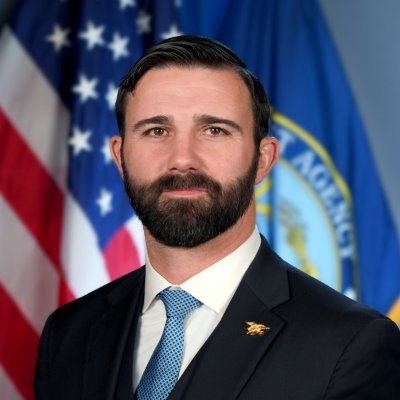
- Official portrait, 2025

Administrator of the Federal Emergency Management Agency
- Incumbent
- Assumed office August 10, 2026
- President: Donald Trump
- Preceded by: Robert J. Fenton (acting)
- In office January 22, 2025 – May 8, 2025; Acting
- President: Donald Trump
- Preceded by: Tony Robinson (acting)
- Succeeded by: David Richardson (acting)

Personal details
- Born: 1986 or 1987 (age 39–40)
- Party: Republican
- Spouse: Karen Hamilton
- Children: 3
- Education: Campbell University (BS)

Military service
- Allegiance: United States
- Branch/service: United States Navy
- Years of service: 2005–2015
- Unit: United States Navy SEALs

Cameron Hamilton (born 1986) is an American business executive and government official who served as the acting administrator of the Federal Emergency Management Agency (FEMA) from January to May 2025. Before his FEMA appointment, he was director of business strategy for a defense contractor in Virginia. He previously served as a Navy SEAL.

Hamilton was fired on May 8, 2025. In April 2026, The New York Times reported that President Donald Trump was considering renominating Hamilton to lead FEMA again, and Hamilton was formally renominated on May 11.

== Career ==
Hamilton enlisted in the United States Navy in 2005, receiving an honorable discharge after ten years. He served as a supervisory emergency management specialist at the Department of State from 2015 to 2020. He then became director of emergency medical services at the Department of Homeland Security, where he oversaw approximately 4,000 emergency medical technicians along the southern border until 2023.

Hamilton ran for the 2024 Republican primary for Virginia's 7th congressional district, finishing second with 37.2% of the vote behind Derrick Anderson's 45.2%. Anderson subsequently lost the general election to Eugene Vindman by a narrow margin. Following his primary defeat, Hamilton became vice president of Feds for Freedom, a conservative nonprofit organization. He gained prominence on social media for his criticism of FEMA's response to Hurricane Helene during the Biden administration.

Hamilton's selection as acting FEMA administrator departed from post-Hurricane Katrina precedent, where the agency had been led by disaster management professionals with state or local emergency management experience.

On Wednesday, May 7, 2025, Hamilton appeared before a U.S. House Appropriations subcommittee on Homeland Security where he advocated for the agency, saying, "I do not believe it is in the best interest of the American people to eliminate the Federal Emergency Management Agency." He was fired the next day and replaced with another acting administrator. In April 2026, Trump planned to nominate Hamilton to lead FEMA again.

== Personal life ==
Hamilton is married and has three children. He is Christian.

Political offices
| Preceded by Tony Robinson; Acting | Administrator of the Federal Emergency Management Agency; Acting; 2025 | Succeeded by David Richardson; Acting |
| Preceded by Robert J. Fenton; Acting | Administrator of the Federal Emergency Management Agency; 2026–present | Incumbent |
