= 2009 FFAS Senior League =

FFAS Senior League
- Season: 2009
- Champions: Black Roses
- Matches: 35
- Goals: 214 (6.11 per match)
- Biggest home win: Fagasa Youth 7–1 Utulei Youth
- Biggest away win: Pago Youth B 2–13 Pago Youth A
- Highest scoring: Pago Youth B 2–13 Pago Youth A

The 2009 season of the FFAS Senior League was the twenty ninth season of association football competition in American Samoa. Black Roses won the championship, their first recorded title, with the winners of the 1998 league competition and a number of previous seasons unknown.

The league was initially intended to consist of a round robin group stage where all teams would play each other once. The top four teams would then qualify for one-legged semi finals to decide the two teams that would compete in the final for the championship. However, the final two rounds of the regular stage as well as the playoffs were cancelled. This was decided by the respective club presidents on October 13, 2009, due to damage at Pago Pago, the only regulation pitch, caused by the 2009 Samoa earthquake and tsunami. Additionally four of the clubs are based in the villages: Fagasa, Leone and Pago Pago, were badly damaged by the tsunami.

== League table ==
Pos	Team	Pld	W	D	L	GF	GA	GD	Pts
1	Black Roses (C)	7	6	0	1	18	6	+12	18
2	Ilaoa and Toomata	7	6	0	1	23	12	+11	18
3	Pago Youth A	7	5	0	2	40	10	+30	15
4	PanSa	7	4	1	2	24	17	+7	13
5	Fagasa Youth	7	4	0	3	24	18	+6	12
6	Tafuna Jets	7	3	1	3	17	18	−1	10
7	FC SKBC	7	3	0	4	27	22	+5	9
8	Green Bay	7	1	0	6	13	31	−18	3
9	Utulei Youth	7	1	0	6	11	33	−22	3
10	Pago Youth B	7	1	0	6	17	47	−30	3

Updated to match(es) played on 19 September 2009. Source:
Rules for classification: 1) points; 2) goal difference; 3) number of goals scored.
(C) Champions

== Results ==
Home \ Away	BLR	FAY	SKB	GRE	I&T	PYA	PYB	PSM	TAF	UTU
Black Roses					2–1	1–0	5–1		3–0	
Fagasa Youth			3–6	4–2				4–1		7–1
FC SKBC	1–3							2–6		3–1
Green Bay					2–6	0–7	4–2		2–4	
Ilaoa and Toomata		3–1					6–3	3–2		3–2
Pago Youth A		2–3	3–2						5–2	
Pago Youth B			2–12			2–13		1–4		6–3
PanSa Men's	2–1			5–2					4–4	
Tafuna Jets		3–2	4–1		0–1					
Utulei Youth	1–3			3–1		0–10				

Updated to match(es) played on 19 September 2009. Source:
Legend: Blue = home team win; Yellow = draw; Red = away team win.

Pool was played on a round robin basis, results are reported as per RSSSF, hence why some teams appear to have played more "home" games than others.
