= Mark Cerney =

American nonprofit founder

Mark V. Cerney
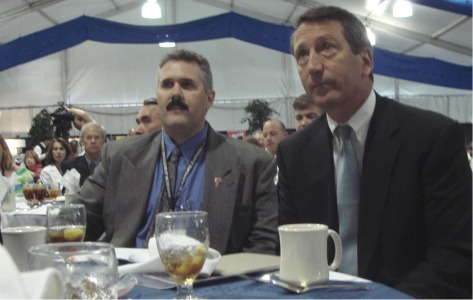
- Mark Cerney (left) at the 2007 Emergency Preparedness Conference with Governor Mark Sanford (right)
- Born: April 10, 1967 (age 59); San Diego, California United States
- Military career
- Allegiance: United States
- Branch: United States Marine Corps
- Service years: 1986–1993
- Rank: Cpl Corporal
- Unit: 3rd Battalion, 1st Marines

Mark V. Cerney (born April 10, 1967) is the founder of an American nonprofit organization. He is best known for creating the Next of Kin Registry (NOKR) model.

His background includes graduating the St. John's Military School and serving with the US Marine Corps 1986–1993. In 1989 Mr. Cerney was recognized by the United States Seventh Fleet for his role in saving 16 U.S. Marine survivors of a CH-53D helicopter crash while serving in the US Marines. He is married and has three children. The Next of Kin Registry became internationally known after appearing on CNN and Larry King after Hurricane Katrina. NOKR is an international free resource for the public to register emergency contact information that is only accessible to emergency agencies during times of urgent need. The organization was founded in 2004 and has been a resource used during Hurricane Katrina, the 7 July 2005 London bombings, the Asian tsunami, the 2012 Aurora theater shooting, Hurricane Sandy, the Orlando nightclub shooting, Hurricane Harvey, Hurricane Irma, Hurricane Maria, the 2017 Las Vegas shooting, the 2019 Virginia Beach shooting, the coronavirus pandemic COVID-19, and other disasters to include daily emergencies. The NOKR organization has volunteers in 50 US states and 87 countries. NOKR is the central depository for emergency contact information in the United States. The NOKR resource is used by more than 400 million registrants.

In 2005, after Hurricane Katrina, Senator Barack Obama (now former US President) introduced the National Next of Kin Registry to the 109th United States Congress in S.1630, The National Emergency Family Locator Act. The Next of Kin Registry was referenced in this bill as a standard for the Secretary of Homeland Security to consider in establishing the National Emergency Family Locator System.

In 2006 the American Red Cross partnered with the Next of Kin Registry. The American Red Cross, along with many familiar partner agencies, such as FEMA, the United States Postal Service and the National Center for Missing and Exploited Children, wanted to ensure that families have a bevy of resources and options to use in order to communicate in times of disaster.

In 2007 the US Federal Emergency Management Agency (FEMA) consulted with the Next of Kin Registry in an effort to answer HR5441 (Department of Homeland Security Appropriations Act, 2007), SEC. 689c. NOKR put forth the requested solution for the National Emergency Family Registry and Locator System (NEFRLS), which was established in compliance with Congressional legislation SEC. 689c of H.R. 5441 to help family members separated after major disasters to communicate with one another.

Mark serves as the President of NOKR in Washington, D.C., a non-profit public benefit resource used globally by emergency agencies to reunify families when emergencies happen or national disasters occur.

== Early life ==
In 1989 Mark Cerney worked at the San Diego County Medical Examiners office. Cerney is shown removing the bodies of Dan Broderick and Linda Broderick on this San Diego KGTV 10 news clip. Mark Cerney is the front person handling the stretcher for the San Diego County Medical Examiners office. Betty Broderick was convicted for this double murder that took place on November 5, 1989 at 1041 Cypress Avenue in the Marston Hills neighborhood near Balboa Park in San Diego.

== International usage ==
In recent times, the NOKR resource was used during the 2009 Samoa earthquake and tsunami, the 2010 Haiti earthquake, the 2010–11 Queensland floods, the 2011 Tōhoku earthquake and tsunami, the January 2011 Rio de Janeiro floods and mudslides, the 2011 Norway attacks, the 2012 Costa Concordia disaster, the 2012 crash of Dana Air Flight 992, the 2017 Saint Petersburg Metro bombing, the 2017 Manchester Arena bombing, the 2017 London Bridge attack, the 2017 Grenfell Tower fire, and the 2017 Central Mexico earthquake.

== Management and organizational history ==
In July 2009, Michael D. Brown the former Undersecretary of Emergency Preparedness and Response (EP&R), a division of the Department of Homeland Security (DHS), a position generally referred to as the director or administrator of the Federal Emergency Management Agency (FEMA) became the Chief Executive Officer of NOKR.

== Partnerships ==
On February 4, 2013, Microsoft officially partnered with NOKR to link the international resource with Microsoft HealthVault.

== Department of Motor Vehicles ==
The Next of Kin Registry model is now being used by many state Department of Motor Vehicles in the United States. These states have opted to create legislation and use an in state only version of the Next of Kin Registry South Carolina, Colorado, Delaware, Florida, Illinois, Indiana, New Jersey, Nevada and Ohio.

== Personal life ==
Cerney and his wife Kerri Jo of FEMA have three children. Mark V Cerney is also a cousin of actor Michael Landon. Landon is known for his roles as Little Joe Cartwright in Bonanza (1959–1973), Charles Ingalls in Little House on the Prairie (1974–1983), and Jonathan Smith in Highway to Heaven (1984–1989). Cerney is also the brother in-law to Stephen Richards the lead singer of Taproot (band). Mark Cerney’s second cousin is the daughter of Michael Landon, Jennifer Landon. Landon who is an American actress. She is known for her role as Teeter on the Paramount Network series, Yellowstone (2020–present). She is also known for her role as Gwen Norbeck Munson in the CBS soap opera As the World Turns (2005–2010). For her part on the show, Landon won three consecutive Daytime Emmy Award for Outstanding Younger Actress in a Drama Series.
