= 2009 Samoa earthquake and tsunami =

Natural disaster in the southern Pacific Ocean

- Location within Oceania
- UTC time: 2009-09-29 17:48:10
- ISC event: 15162203
- USGS-ANSS: ComCat
- Local date: 29 September 2009
- Local time: 06:48:10
- Magnitude: 8.1 M_{w}
- Depth: 15 km (9.3 mi)
- Epicenter: 15.53°S 171.87°W
- Type: First subevent normal; second and third subevent megathrust
- Areas affected: Samoa; American Samoa; Tonga; Cook Islands; Fiji; French Polynesia; New Zealand
- Max. intensity: MMI VI (Strong)
- Tsunami: 22 m (72 ft)
- Casualties: at least 189 fatalities hundreds injured

The 2009 Samoa earthquake and tsunami took place on 29 September 2009 in the southern Pacific Ocean adjacent to the Tonga–Kermadec subduction zone. The submarine earthquake occurred in an extensional environment and had a moment magnitude of 8.1 and a maximum Mercalli intensity of VI (Strong). It was the largest earthquake of 2009. The earthquake initiated with a normal-faulting event with a magnitude of 8.1. Within two minutes of the earthquake rupture, two large magnitude 7.8 earthquakes occurred on the subduction zone interface. The two magnitude 7.8 earthquakes had a combined magnitude equivalent to 8.0. The event can be considered a doublet earthquake.

Normal and thrust faulting triggered a tsunami which caused substantial damage and loss of life in Samoa, American Samoa, and Tonga. The Pacific Tsunami Warning Center recorded a 3-inch (76 mm) rise in sea levels near the epicenter, and New Zealand scientists determined that the waves measured 14 metres (46 ft) at their highest on the Samoan coast. The quake occurred on the outer rise of the Kermadec-Tonga subduction zone. This is part of the Pacific Ring of Fire, where tectonic plates in the Earth's lithosphere meet and earthquakes and volcanic activity are common.

Countries affected by the tsunami, in the areas that were hit are American Samoa, Samoa and Tonga (Niuatoputapu) where more than 189 people were killed, especially children, most of them in Samoa. Large waves with no major damage were reported on the coasts of Fiji, the northern coast of New Zealand and Rarotonga in the Cook Islands. People took precautions in the low-lying atolls of Tokelau and moved to higher ground. Niue was reported as reasonably safe because it is high. There were no reports of high waves from Vanuatu, Kiribati, New Caledonia and the Solomon Islands.

== American Samoa ==
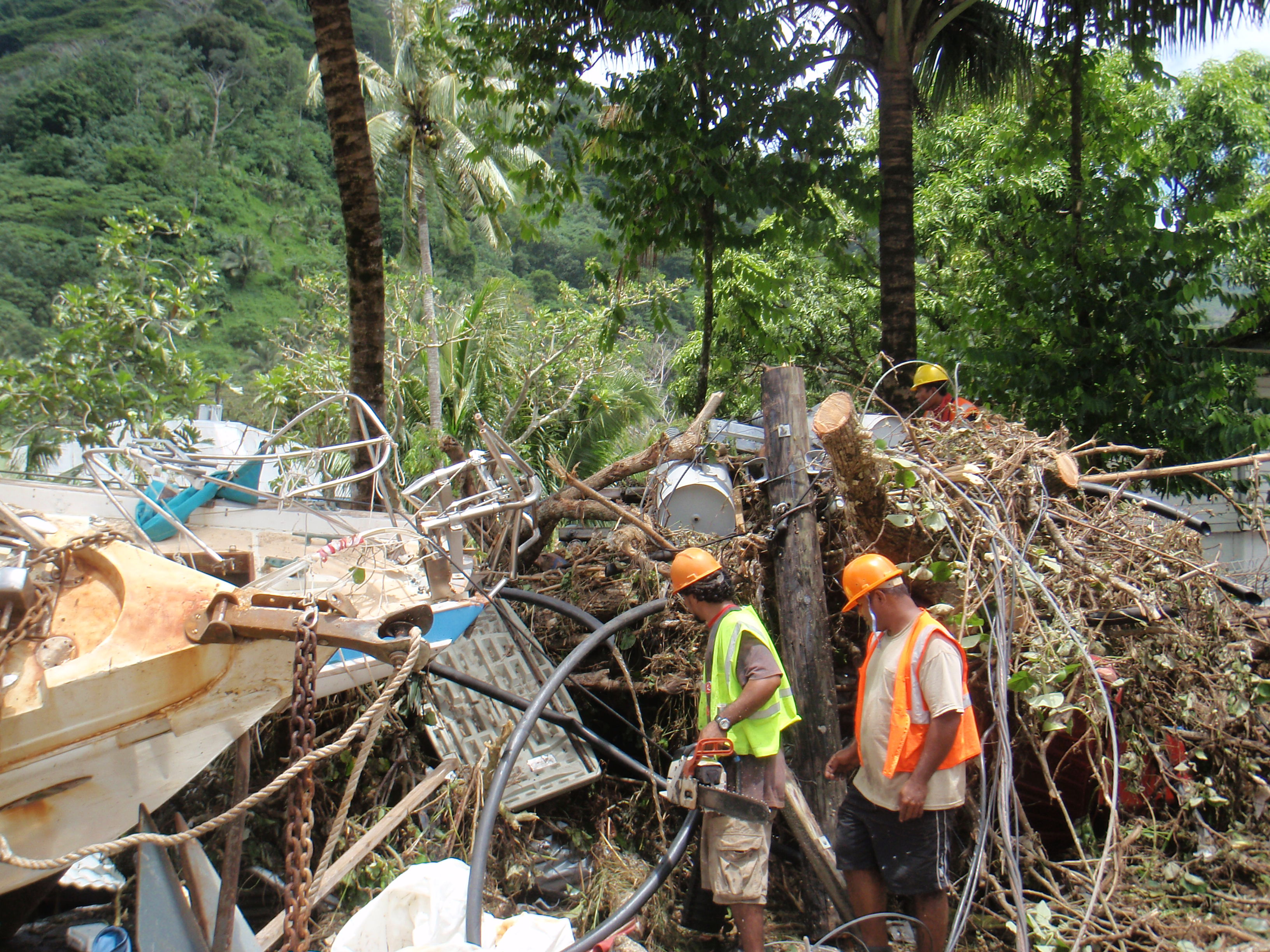
Crews working near the damage from the tsunami in American Samoa

The Los Angeles Times, quoting a source at the National Park of American Samoa, reported that "four tsunami waves, 15 to 20 ft (4.6 to 6 m) high", and "reaching up to a mile (1.6 km) inland" hit American Samoa shortly after the earthquake. The water flowed inland about 100 yd (100 m) before receding, leaving some cars stuck in the mud. Damage to the National Park's natural reserves and the destruction of its visitor center and main offices have been reported, while only 20% of the park's 40 to 50 employees and volunteers had been found.

A beach village was reported to have been "wiped out", killing at least 14 people after the earthquake had sent residents fleeing for higher ground. Large numbers of American Samoans were said to have been left injured or homeless.

Confirmed death tolls rose to 22 people, with many people still missing in the villages of Leone and Pago Pago.

A Radio New Zealand International correspondent reported that the center of Pago Pago, the largest city in American Samoa, had sustained heavy damage in the tsunami, with its main street flooded, cars overturned, and shoreline businesses damaged. He "also witnessed looting in one of the stores".

American Samoa Governor Togiola Tulafono was in Honolulu, Hawaii, for an ocean policy conference at the time of the tsunami struck. Tulafono was monitoring events in American Samoa, but was having difficulties reaching the territory because of communications failures. He told reporters that because of the tight knit communities and strong family bonds, "I don't think anybody is going to be spared this disaster." Tulafono departed Hawaii for American Samoa on a United States Coast Guard supply flight from Honolulu on the evening of 29 September.

Security camera footage of the tsunami surging through a parking lot in Pago Pago.

Lieutenant Governor Ipulasi Aitofele Sunia announced that the earthquake had caused severe damage to American Samoa's electrical infrastructure. The main electricity generator in Satala had been damaged, which knocked out power from the central village of Faga'alu across Tutuila to the eastern village of Onenoa. The Satala electrical plant may be out of service for a month or more until repairs can be made, with the American Samoa Power Authority (ASPA) stating that power would be out indefinitely. A new power plant at Satala was expected to be commissioned on 25 May 2017. Electricity was also out on the islands of Ofu-Olosega, in the Manu'a Islands Group, and a government plane has been sent to assess damage on Ofu.

The water system was also damaged in the earthquake, and the supply of fresh water to eastern parts of American Samoa has been disrupted due to broken water lines. The water division of the American Samoa Power Authority (ASPA) announced that it will bring water in tanker trucks to affected villages. Residents were warned to conserve and boil water until safe drinking water supplies can be restored, which could take some time.

U.S. President Barack Obama declared a major disaster in American Samoa, allowing federal funds to be used for rescues, life support, and public health and safety measures. Among the initial U.S. government response was a Federal Emergency Management Agency (FEMA) logistics team and staff from the Department of Health and Human Services (HHS), Coast Guard, Federal Aviation Administration, and Department of Defense. Also, basic needs and basic commodities, including electrical generators, medical supplies, and pharmaceutical drugs were sent out, and multiple planes are being prepared for more cargo and personnel, including FEMA, HHS, and Coast Guard staff and experts from the Environmental Protection Agency, U.S. Army Corps of Engineers, and Red Cross. The USS Ingraham (FFG-61) arrived in American Samoa on 30 September and assisted recovery efforts with its two Seahawk helicopters.

== Samoa ==
Residents in the city of Apia on Upolu island were evacuated to higher ground. Journalist Cherelle Jackson reported that the city quickly emptied in the aftermath of the earthquake and tsunami, "All the schools, workplaces everyone has walked up – it's like a ghost town."

Twenty villages on Upolu south side were reportedly destroyed, including Lepā, the home of Samoa's Prime Minister Tuila'epa Sa'ilele Malielegaoi. In Lepā, only the church and the village's welcome sign remained standing following the tsunami. The hardest hit areas in Samoa appear to be Fagaloa Bay on the east coast of Upolu, Lalomanu on the south east coast, and along the rest of the southern coast of the island, with one hospital in Apia reporting it had received 79 bodies. The village of Poutasi on the south west coast of Upolu was reported with extensive damage in a TVNZ news item, along with its neighbouring Villages of Satalo and Salani being completely wiped out. A mother at the Taufua Beach Fales in Lalomanu watched her three young children swept away by the tsunami. Elsewhere there were reports of landslides near Solosolo and damage to plantations near Apia.

A number of tourist resorts are located on Upolu's south coast. These include Coconuts Beach Resort and Sinalei Reef Resort and Spa in the village of Siumu. Both resorts published tsunami updates on their websites. The Sa'Moana Resort is in the village of Salamumu.

The eastern part of the island remains without power or water supplies after the earthquake.

A Red Cross worker reported to Radio New Zealand that waves 10 feet (3 m) high had flattened beachside resorts on Upolu, and that residents told him the tourist zone of Lalomanu had been crushed by a wall of water about 20–30 ft (6.1–9.1 m) high. The cliffs above Lalomanu were scoured out to a height of 10–15 m (33–49 ft).

Power outages were reported, and phone lines were jammed. Samoan officials confirmed the runway at Faleolo International Airport on Upolu was safe by early afternoon (30 September 2009).

Samoan Prime Minister Tuila'epa Sa'ilele Malielegaoi, and his Deputy Prime Minister Misa Telefoni Retzlaff were in Auckland, New Zealand, at the time of the earthquake. Both political leaders immediately returned to Samoa. Prime Minister Malielegaoi lost two relatives in the tsunami, including the daughter of one of his nieces.

The Prime Minister made his first address to the nation, after the tsunami, on 1 October. The Government of Samoa estimates the damage at US$147.25 million.

On 2 October 2009, an estimated 3,000 people were homeless and seeking refuge in shelters set up around the worst-affected villages. New Zealand's Minister of Foreign Affairs Murray McCully visited Apia to co-ordinate New Zealand's emergency relief effort. New Zealand Prime Minister John Key arrived in Samoa on 3 October and visited some of the most damaged areas on Upolu including the villages of Poutasi and Lalolamu.

The Samoa government and the people of Samoa held a national funeral at Apia Park for tsunami victims on 8 October 2009 (Samoa local time).

== Tonga ==
Animation of the tsunami's propagation.

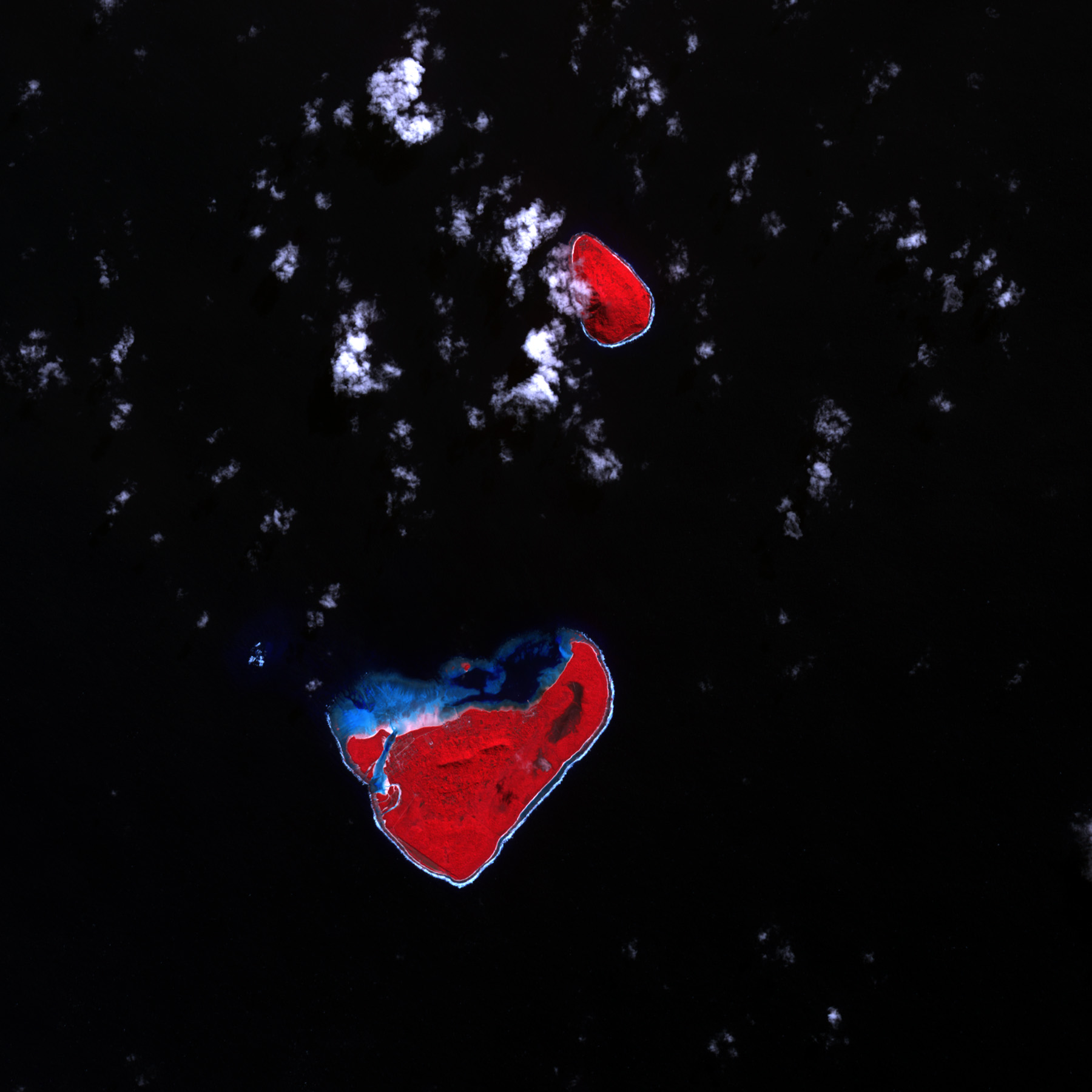
Niuatoputapu before the tsunami. (Vegetation is red, bare ground is pale blue-grey, clouds and breaking waves are white or cyan.)

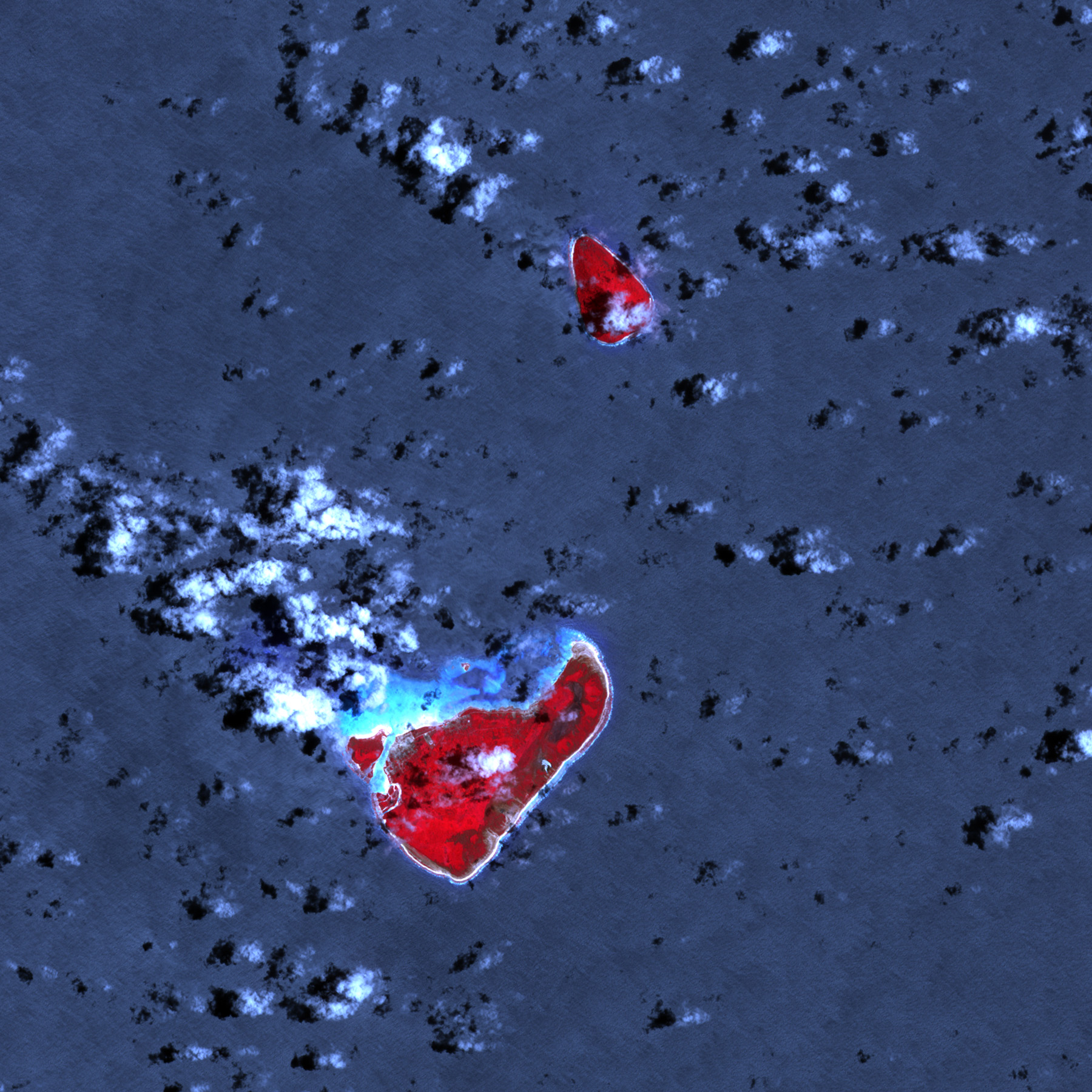
Niuatoputapu after the tsunami.

The main impact in Tonga was in the northern part of the island kingdom where there were deaths, injuries and extensive damage on Niuatoputapu, a flat coral island 500 km north of the main island Tongatapu, and reportedly closest to the epicentre of the earthquake. The death toll on the island has risen to nine. A Tongan government spokesman Alfred Soakai said 90% of homes had been destroyed as well as serious damage to the hospital. An adviser to the prime minister, Lopeti Senituli, later said the amount of damage to buildings has been downgraded to 60%. There are three main villages on Niuatoputapu: Hihifo and Falehau, which were hit by three waves, some 6m high, and the village of Vaipoa, which received less damage. A new school building remained standing and provided some shelter. The island is isolated with a population of around 1,000 people. Approximately 192 families were left homeless and the homes of 143 additional families were damaged in the tsunami in the villages of Hihifo, Falehau and Vaipoa. 289 families lived in residences which escaped damage in the disaster.

Other reports outlined coastal damage from a 13-foot (4.0 m) wave on the islands. Other media had earlier reported 10 people killed in Tonga. Three people are missing and four sustained serious injuries. Earlier, a government plane sent to the island could not land due to tsunami damage at Niuatoputapu Airport, which had been forced to close. Tonga's acting Prime Minister Lord Tuita said the government is sending a second plane to Niuatoputapu, but that communication links have been damaged.

The government appealed for clothing and bedding donations for residents in Niuatoputapu.

Relief efforts undertaken by the Tongan government and Red Cross focused on Niuatoputapu, with support from Australia, New Zealand and France. A United Nations coordinator was scheduled to travel to Tonga to support early recovery initiatives in areas such as 'health, sanitation, water, infrastructure, psychological support, agriculture and fishing'.

There were no reports of any damage to Vavaʻu island group or to the main island of Tongatapu, where the capital, Nukuʻalofa, is.

== French Polynesia ==
French Polynesia escaped much of the damage inflicted against other Polynesian countries and territories by the earthquake. Concern centered on the Marquesas Islands, the northernmost archipelago in French Polynesia. Unlike the other islands of French Polynesia, the Marquesas have no protective coral reefs which would absorb the impact of a potential tsunami.

French High Commissioner Adolphe Colrat warned residents of the Marquesas to seek shelter at an elevation of at least 10 m (33 ft) above sea level. Residents across French Polynesia were advised to avoid valleys and bays, tie up watercraft and listen to Réseau France Outre-mer (RFO) for further instruction.

In the Marquesas Islands, some bays were nearly emptied of their water before a wave crashed back in and refilled the area. Boats in the region immediately left port once the warning was issued. The cargo and passenger ship Aranui 3, which had been docked in Taiohae Bay on Nuku Hiva in the Marquesas, the area most impacted by a small tsunami wave, immediately evacuated the bay for open water.

Outside of the Marquesas, the threat of a tsunami largely passed without much incidence. The government had initially feared a wave of approximately 90 cm (35 in), with the ability to strike all parts of the sprawling territory. Five small tsunami waves, measuring 25–70 cm (10–28 in) were recorded off the coast of Papeete, Tahiti, between 11:10 am and 12 noon local time on Tuesday. The first tsunami wave at 11:10 am measured 25 cm (10 in), while the second recorded wave was measured at 35 cm (14 in) at 11:23 am The waves gradually increased in size, with the fifth, and last wave, being recorded at 70 cm (28 in) tall at 12:03 pm.

The Colombian Navy training ship Gloria, also left Papeete Harbor in Tahiti once the warning was issued as a precaution. Residents of the Society Islands, which include the tourist resort areas of Tahiti and Moorea, were advised to move above 5 m (16 ft) above sea level, for safety.

High Commissioner Adolphe Colrat cancelled the tsunami red alert at 12:03 pm on Tuesday for all areas of French Polynesia except the Marquesas. The alert for the Marquesas Islands was extended 2:50 pm until the threat had passed.

French Polynesian President Oscar Temaru wrote to the heads of American Samoa, Samoa and Tonga offering support following the tsunami, "On behalf of the people and the government of French Polynesia, I would like to convey our most sincere expression of condolence and solidarity in the wake of the Tsunami that just hit your people...We have, within the FRANZ framework decided to send both human and material help. 1 doctor, 2 nurses and one logistics expert, all members of our emergency medical staff will carry a total of 600 kg [sic] of medical material that will be dispatched locally by the FRANZ authorities." FRANZ stands for France, Australia and New Zealand, three large countries who traditionally provide aid in Oceania following natural disasters.

The Guardian reported 189 deaths; 149 in Samoa, 31 American Samoa, 9 Tonga (2 October 2009).

== Tsunami memorial ==
Following the 1st anniversary of February 2011 earthquake memorial in Christchurch, a memorial dedicated to the tsunami victims was erected in the village of Leone, American Samoa on 25 February 2012. Leone, a small village on a bay was, particularly hard-hit. The monument is called the Healing Garden.

== International aid ==
=== Governments ===
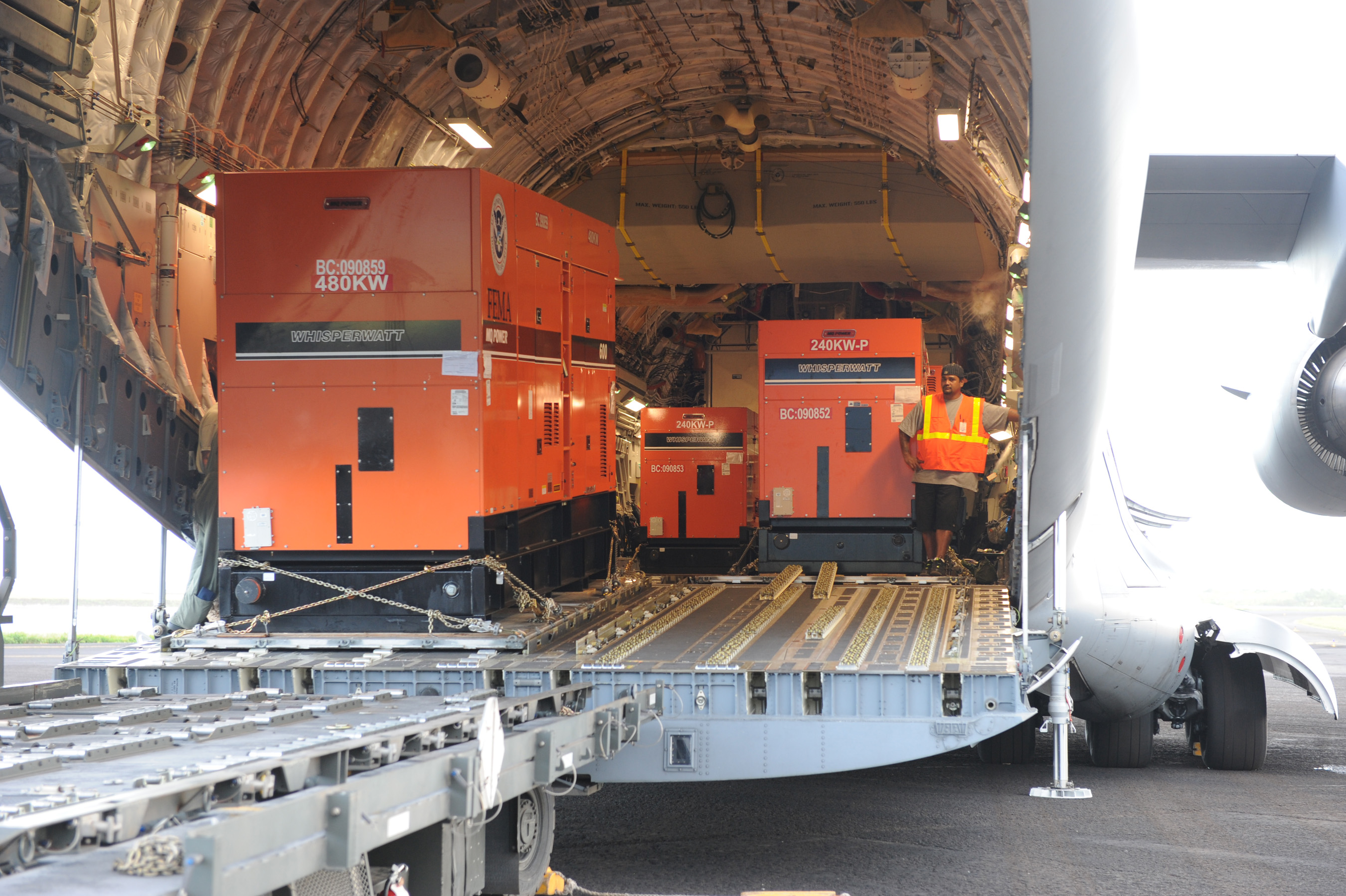
FEMA generators being unloaded.

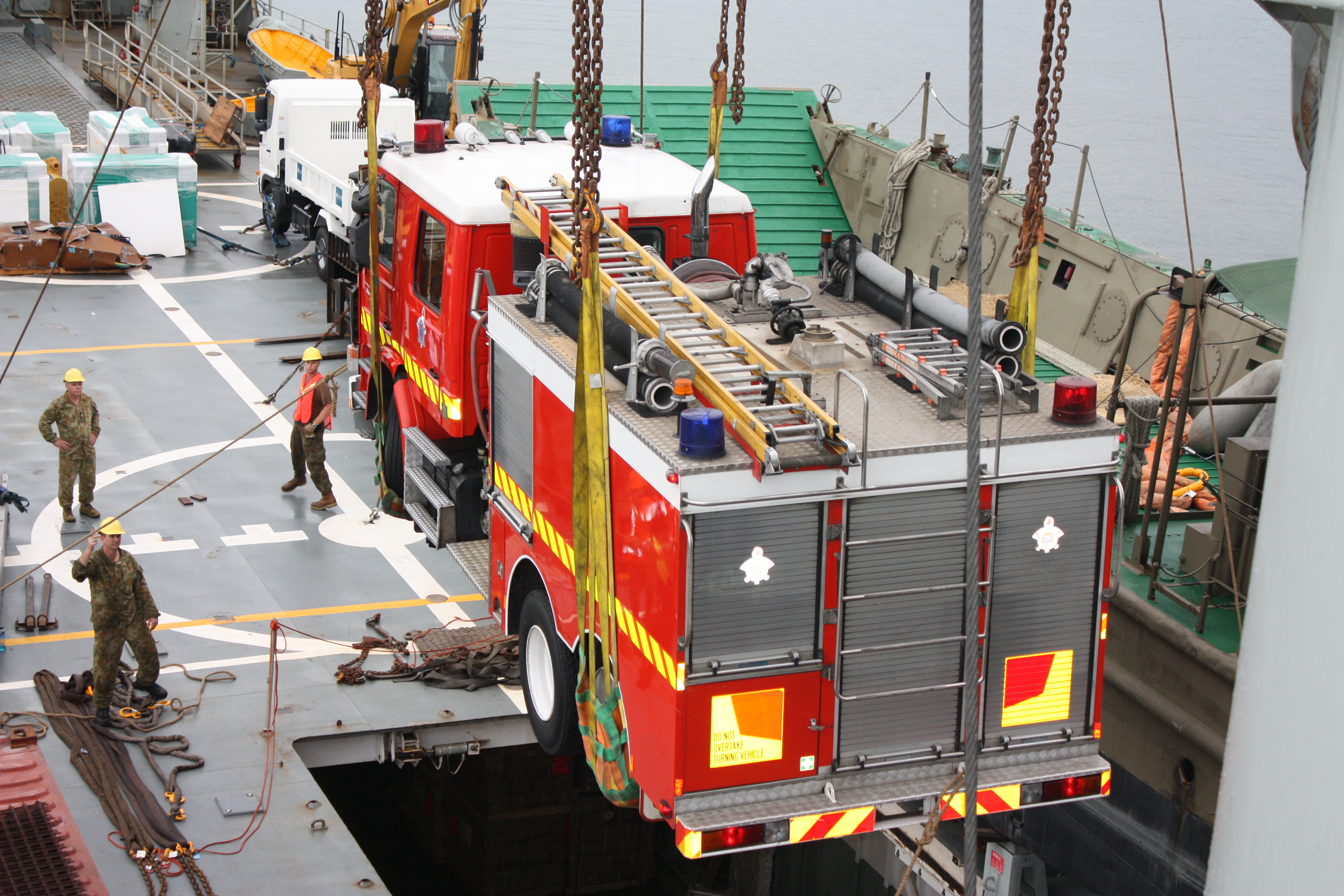
A fire truck for the Samoa Fire and Emergency Services Authority.

New Zealand dispatched RNZAF P-3 Orions to assess the damage and search for bodies. An RNZAF C-130 Hercules with medical staff and supplies, makeshift morgues, stretchers, tents and food was sent on the 30th. A further 7 RNZAF and 2 Royal Australian Air Force Hercules flights were made, and a RAAF C-17 Globemaster also provided airlift support to ferry relief supplies. These were distributed within the islands by RNZAF Bell UH-1H helicopters. Air New Zealand arranged for larger Boeing 777 aircraft to carry in relief workers and evacuate tourists to Auckland, and fly the Samoan Prime Minister back to his country. The New Zealand helicopter carrying ship HMNZS Canterbury was sent to Samoa (also offloading aid and personnel in Tonga). The New Zealand government also pledged over NZ$12 million for relief efforts.

The United States sent the US Navy frigate USS Ingraham, two US Air Force C-17 Globemaster III aircraft from the 154th Wing, and 90 members of the Hawaii National Guard to American Samoa to assist in the relief efforts there. The US Army Corps of Engineers, Army Geospatial Center, prepared an emergency webpage for geological, hydrological and trafficability information for relief engineering and humanitarian aid.

Australia sent teams of paramedics, doctors, nurses and search and rescue specialists with essential supplies like tents and medicine.

Other aid came from concerned individuals and groups throughout the world, namely New Zealand, Australia, the United States and Canada.

=== Aid agencies ===
- The European Commission announced it was setting up a scheme for a humanitarian fund with an initial amount of €150,000. The fund was channelled to the International Red Cross through the Disaster Response Emergency Fund (DREF) "to assist with primary emergency needs in Samoa depending upon the first 'on the ground' assessments."
- Oxfam International said it was ready to respond to the disaster with staff and supplies on standby. Oxfam's New Zealand branch launched a fund for donations.
- Samoa and American Samoa have local Red Cross offices. New Zealand Red Cross humanitarian aid workers were also on stand-by to travel to Samoa, and had started a fund for donations. The Red Cross built 76 ten-foot by twenty foot single room homes and 23 twenty foot by twenty foot multi room homes in Nuiatoputapu to replace homes destroyed there by the tsunami.
- Aid funds were also organised by the Rotary Club of NZ and ANZ Bank.
- The United States said federal aid would be made available to combat the devastation. Craig Fugate, head of the Federal Emergency Management Agency, said FEMA sent an incident management assistance team and a planning and response team "to provide support and on the ground assessment" in along with assistance from the US Coast Guard.
- The Church of Jesus Christ of Latter-day Saints organized humanitarian aid from members of the church in the USA, New Zealand, Samoa and Tonga to be delivered to those in need. On Tonga's main island of Tongatapu, 12 LDS stake presidents asked church members on the radio to donate food, clothing, cooking equipment, pillows, blankets and other necessities, and LDS church buildings in American Samoa housed the displaced victims of the disaster.
- The Next of Kin Registry (NOKR) was a vital resource used for family reunification post the tsunami, according to the Deputy Director of the Territorial Emergency Management Coordinating Office (TEMCO).
- ADRA (Adventist Development and Relief Agency) deployed a coordinator on the ground in Samoa to provide emergency management support to the response efforts. Mr Eager has taken initial aid with him, and by Friday 2 October had visited the devastated areas on the south coast of Upolu. He is coordinating ADRA's response with the Samoan Disaster Management Council and other responding agencies to compile findings and plan coordinated relief. ADRA launched a Pacific Disaster Appeal in both Australia and New Zealand.

== Emergency relief funds for donations ==
- The New Zealand Red Cross appeal raised donations amounting to almost NZ$3.5 million.
- Oxfam New Zealand set up a rapid response emergency fund at their website.
- UNICEF (NZ)
- ADRA Australia has set up a Pacific Disasters Appeal donation website, and hotline (1800 242 372).
- ADRA New Zealand has a donation website and call centre (0800 4 999 111).

== Tsunami warnings ==
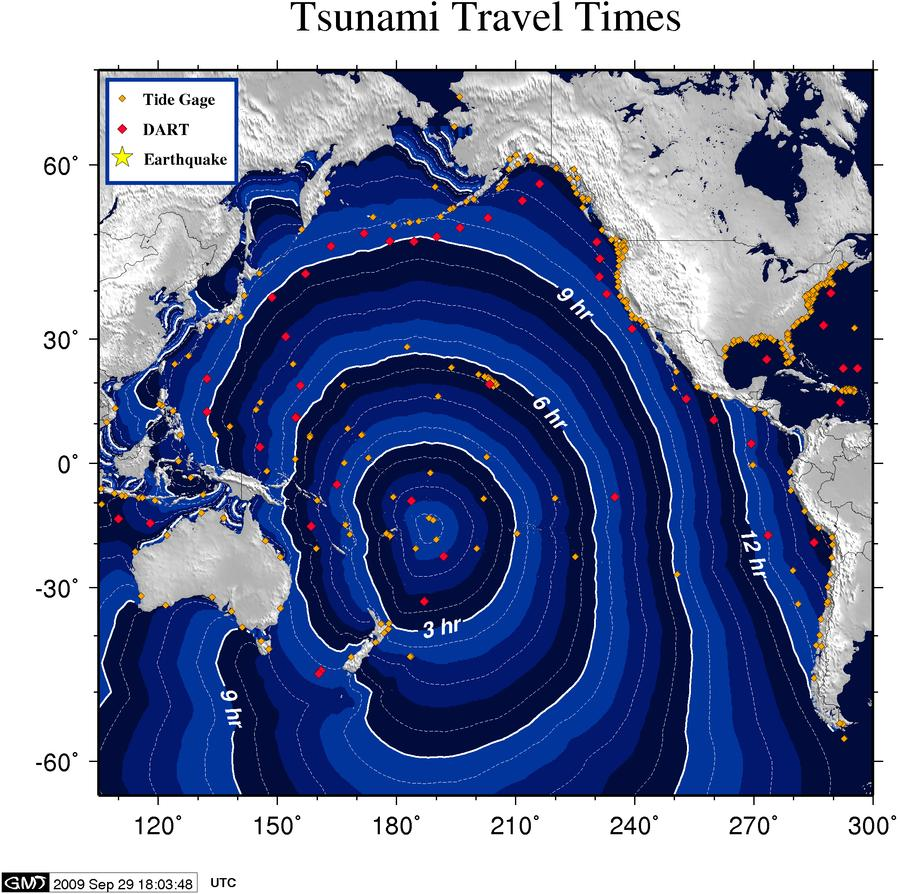
Tsunami travel times from epicentre (in hrs)

A tsunami warning was initially issued for American Samoa, Samoa, Niue, Wallis and Futuna, Tokelau, the Cook Islands, Tonga, Tuvalu, Kiribati, the Kermadec Islands, Fiji, Baker Island, Howland Island, Jarvis Island, New Zealand, French Polynesia, Palmyra Island, Vanuatu, Nauru, Marshall Islands, and Solomon Islands. Most of the warnings were called off once it was clear that the tsunami threat had passed. Officials in the Cook Islands, which hosted the 2009 Pacific Mini Games, noted that the tsunami passed without any damage to the country.

A tsunami warning remained in effect for the Marquesas Islands of French Polynesia, as five main waves were expected to strike that archipelago. Warnings also remained in Tuvalu, one of the lowest lying countries in the world.

Local radio stations in Tonga broadcast warnings that a tsunami was possible and that people should move away from coastal villages.

A tsunami watch was issued for islands farther from the epicenter, including Hawaii and Papua New Guinea, except for California, USA. Officials were determining whether the tsunami could reach Hawaii, the center said. It was possible that a strongly decreased wave could reach Hawaii.

A tsunami advisory was issued for coastal California and the San Francisco Bay Area beginning at 9:00 pm local time as a precaution.

== Aftershocks ==
There were more than 40 total aftershocks with a magnitude greater than 5.0 in the 48 hours after the mainshock.

== See also ==
- List of earthquakes in 2009
- List of earthquakes in Samoa
- List of tsunamis
- 2022 Hunga Tonga–Hunga Haʻapai eruption and tsunami
- 2018 Sulawesi earthquake and tsunami
