= Nicholas Dockery =

American soldier (born 1981)

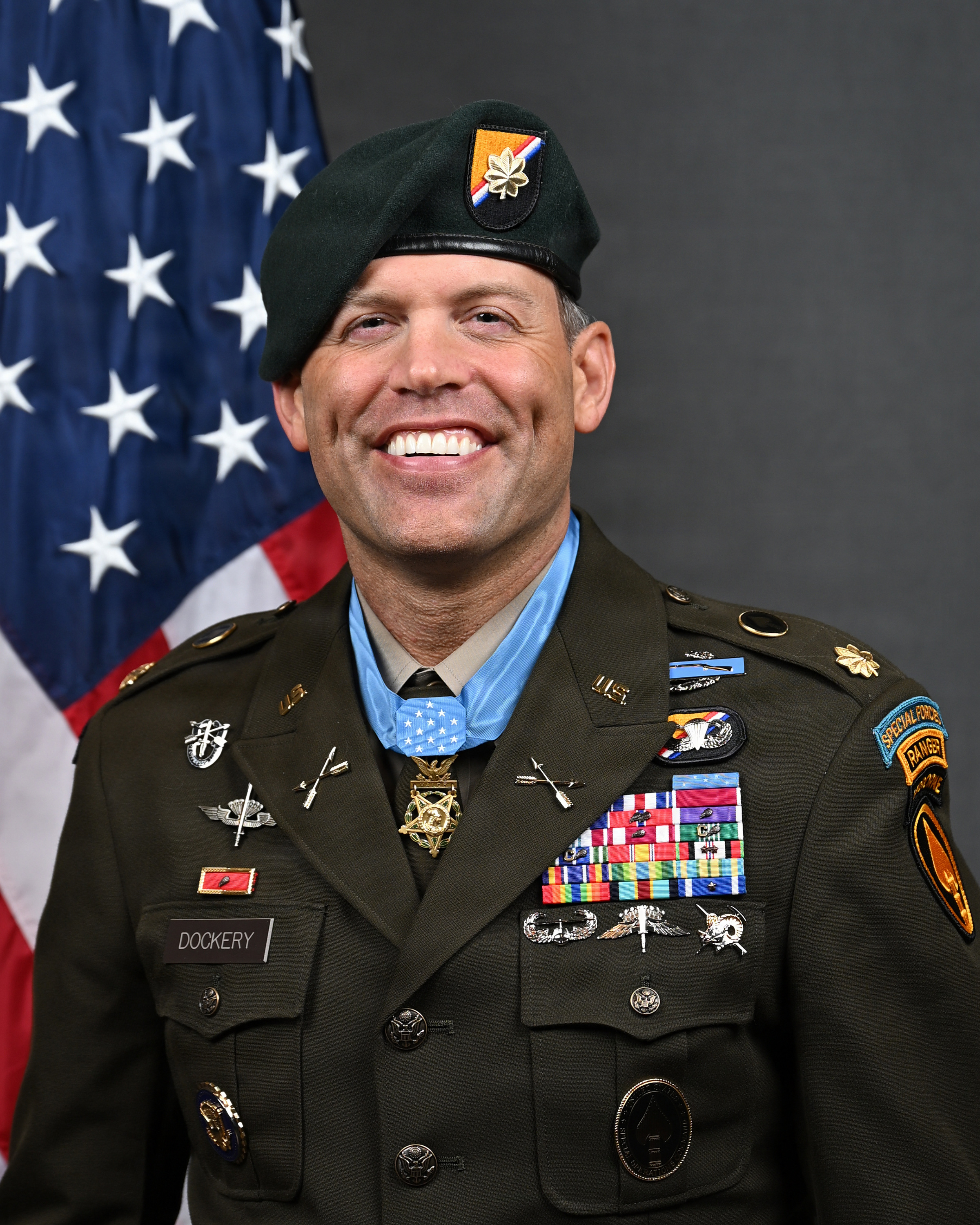
- Official portrait, 2026
- Born: October 3, 1981 (age 45); Indianapolis, Indiana, US
- Alma mater: St. John's Military School; New Mexico Military Institute; United States Military Academy; Yale University; University of Pennsylvania
- Military career
- Branch: United States Army
- Service years: 2004–2026
- Rank: Major
- Nickname: Nick
- Units: 2nd Battalion, 12th Infantry Regiment, 4th Infantry Division; 7th Special Forces Group
- Conflicts: War in Afghanistan
- Awards: Medal of Honor; Silver Star Medal; Legion of Merit; Soldier's Medal; Bronze Star Medal (3rd Award); Purple Heart (2nd Award)

Nicholas Dockery (born 3 October 1981) is a retired United States Army soldier who was awarded the Medal of Honor for actions in the War in Afghanistan. Born in Indianapolis, Indiana, Dockery enlisted in the Army National Guard before attending the United States Military Academy. He deployed to Afghanistan in 2012, where he and his unit were ambushed in Kapisa Province. Dockery rallied American and Afghan troops to repel the attack, while simultaneously protecting wounded allies. Dockery remained with the US Army until 2026, completing Special Forces training and rising to the rank of major. He served as a White House fellow in 2024, and in 2026 received the Medal of Honor for his actions in Kapisa.

== Early life ==
Dockery was born in Indianapolis, Indiana. He attended and graduated from St. John's Military School.

== Military service ==
Initially Dockery was hoping to attend the United States Military Academy straight after high school. Dockery was unable to achieve an appointment leading him to enlisted in the Indiana Army National Guard. Transferring into the New Mexico Army National Guard, Dockery enrolled into the New Mexico Military Institute doing Army ROTC at the military institute. While at the New Mexico Military Institute, he reapplied to the United States Military Academy and was accepted. Dockery graduated from the United States Military Academy in 2011.

As an infantry officer, Dockery deployed to Afghanistan first to Kunar and Kapisa Province in 2012, and to Zabul Province in 2014.

In 2015, Dockery completed Special Forces Assessment and Selection and was assigned to the 7th Special Forces Group. In 2019, Dockery took command of the group's Headquarters and Headquarters Company. In 2022, Dockery was the aide-de-camp for 1st Special Forces Command's commanding general.

In 2022, while assigned to the United States Special Operations Command, Dockery was named the Military Times Soldier of the Year. He is also a recipient of the Douglas MacArthur Leadership award, and the Alexander R. Nininger Award for Valor at Arms.

In 2023, Dockery completed graduate courses at Yale University's Jackson School of Global Affairs, and at the United States Military Academy. In 2024, Dockery was a White House fellow, and placed within the Office of the First Lady. He then was assigned to The Pentagon as part of U.S. Army Special Operations Command.

=== Kapisa Province action ===
On October 2, 2012, Dockery's unit was ambushed in Kapisa provice. Engaging the Taliban forces that attacked the unit, he rallied American and Afghans in the fight. He then went to the aid of a wounded American, consolidated his allies, used his body to shield an ally from an exploding grenade, and rescued an unconscious ally from being taken by the Taliban. After, he exposed himself to direct gunships to provide suppressive fire upon Taliban forces.

==== Medal of Honor citation ====

The President of the United States of America, authorized by act of Congress, March 3rd, 1863, has awarded in the name of Congress the Medal of Honor to Second Lieutenant (Infantry) Nicholas Dockery, United States Army. Second Lieutenant distinguished himself by acts of gallantry and intrepidity above and beyond the call of duty on October 2, 2012, while serving as a Platoon Leader, 2d Battalion, 12th Infantry Regiment, 4th Brigade, 4th Infantry Division in Kapisa Province, Afghanistan. On this day, Second Lieutenant Nicholas Dockery's platoon and associated Afghan forces were ambushed by an estimated 150 Taliban fighters. Ordered to eliminate the threat, Lieutenant Dockery planned and led an assault on the enemy forces. Lieutenant Dockery traversed 100 yards of open terrain under enemy fire to reach U.S. forces in need of assistance. Hearing a U.S. soldier had been wounded, Lieutenant Dockery fought his way to soldiers who were taking cover in a building that was occupied by enemy fighters. Realizing the immediate danger, he organized and led the forces in clearing six rooms of the multi-level compound, killing one enemy fighter and detaining two others. When an enemy grenade landed nearby, he shoved a team member behind cover preventing him from being killed or wounded by the resulting blast. Attempting to regain momentum after the blast, Lieutenant Dockery led a four-man team to clear the compound's courtyard before the enemy used a rocket-propelled grenade, resulting in an explosion that incapacitated two soldiers. Although dazed and wounded himself, Lieutenant Dockery went to the aid of the wounded soldiers who were fully exposed to enemy fire. After helping one soldier to his feet, he engaged and killed two enemy fighters who were attempting to approach the other injured soldier. Lieutenant Dockery provided first aid and used his own body to shield the soldier from further injury, saving his life. Air support assets could not differentiate between friendly and enemy positions, so Lieutenant Dockery marked his position on the building's roof, exposing himself to enemy fire on multiple occasions while providing covering fire to friendly forces evacuating the wounded. He was the last individual to leave the battlefield. Second Lieutenant Dockery's conspicuous gallantry and intrepidity at the risk of his life, above and beyond the call of duty, are in keeping with the highest traditions of military service and reflect great credit upon himself, his unit, and the United States Army.

== Post-military career and Medal of Honor ==
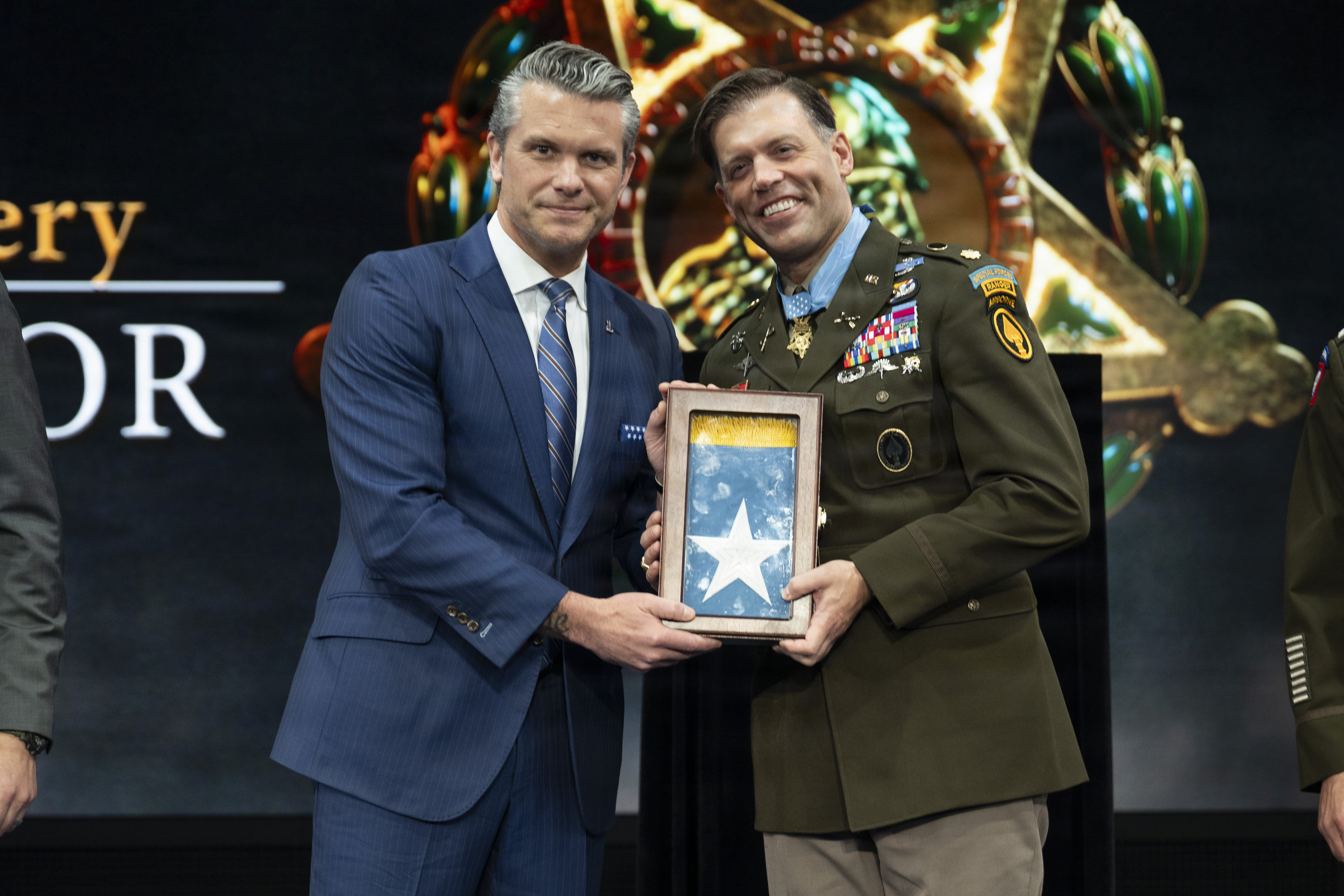
Secretary of Defense Pete Hegseth with Dockery

In 2025, Dockery began attending the University of Pennsylvania; that same year he created a foundation named after himself focused on supporting art, equine therapy, and funding those who need assistance with mental health. Dockery has experienced post-traumatic stress disorder. In May 2026, Dockery retired from the United States Army.

In 2026, Indiana congressman Jim Baird introduced legislation to elevate one of Dockery's two Silver Star Medal awards to a Medal of Honor; in 2022 Dockery was the only Army officer in the post–September 11th attacks era to have received two Silver Star Medals. In the Senate the legislation was advocated by senators Joni Ernst and Todd Young.

On 18 June 2026, Dockery received the Medal of Honor at the White House for his actions in Kapisa Provice on October 2, 2012. Also receiving the award at the same ceremony were James C. Capers Jr., and posthumous recipient John Ripley.
