= Nancy L. Ward =

Nancy Ward
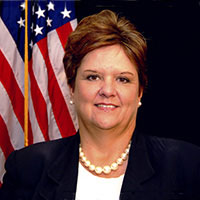

Director of the California Governor's Office of Emergency Services
- Incumbent
- Assumed office December 31, 2022
- Governor: Gavin Newsom
- Preceded by: Mark Ghilarducci

Administrator of the Federal Emergency Management Agency
- Acting
- In office January 21, 2009 – May 12, 2009
- President: Barack Obama
- Preceded by: R. David Paulison
- Succeeded by: Craig Fugate

Personal details
- Born: 1955 or 1956 (age 70–71)
- Party: Democratic

Nancy L. Ward (born 1955/1956) is the Director of the California Governor's Office of Emergency Services (Cal OES) and Homeland Security Adviser to the Governor of California. Previously, Ward served in the Federal Emergency Management Agency (FEMA) as the Regional Administrator for Region IX (which serves AZ, CA, Guam, HI, NV, CNMI, RMI, FSM and American Samoa) from 2006 until 2014. During this time, from January until May of 2009, Ward was selected to serve as FEMA's Acting Administrator by her predecessor, R. David Paulison to serve in his place after he retired on January 21, 2009. She returned to the position of Region IX Administrator in May 2009 after Craig Fugate was appointed as Federal Administrator.

== Biography ==
Before joining FEMA, Ward was Chief of the Disaster Assistance Branch and Deputy State Coordinating Officer for Cal OES. She administered the state's Natural Disaster Assistance Act program assistance provisions, which provide disaster assistance funding to local governments for state-level emergencies and disasters.

Ward served as FEMA Response and Recovery Division Director in 2000 until she became the Regional Administrator for FEMA Region IX in October 2006. In this role, she oversaw FEMA's response and recovery operations for Hurricane Katrina. She also served in various senior management positions in more than 20 disasters, including the earthquake in Hawaii, and the severe storms, flooding, landslides, and mudslides in California in 2006. Ward has received awards for special accomplishments at FEMA, including the 2007 Award for Excellence for her leadership during the California wildfires.

Ward left FEMA to rejoin Cal OES as Chief Deputy Director and Department of Homeland Security Advisor in 2014 and remained in that position until 2017 when she became a Retired Annuitant at Cal OES.

In 2022, Governor Gavin Newsom appointed Ward as the Director of Cal OES.

Political offices
Preceded by David Paulison	Administrator of the Federal Emergency Management Agency; Acting; 2009	Succeeded by Craig Fugate
