= Falehau =

- Village
- Map showing location of Falehau
- Coordinates: 15°56′43.32″S 173°45′56.61″W
- Country: Tonga
- Island: Niuatoputapu

Area
  - Total: 0.17 km^{2} (0.066 sq mi)
- Elevation: 7 m (23 ft)

Falehau is a village on the island of Niuatoputapu in Tonga. The population is 218.

The other two villages on Niuatoputapu are Hihifo, which is the main village on the island, and Vaipoa.

Falehau was extensively damaged by the 2009 Samoa earthquake and tsunami. The tsunami resulted from an 8.0 M_{w} earthquake in the Samoan Islands region at 06:48:11 local time on 29 September 2009 (17:48:11 UTC).
