= Vaipoa =

Village in Tonga

- Location within Tonga
- Coordinates: 15°57′S 173°45′W
- Country: Tonga
- Island: Niuatoputapu

Population
  - Total: 172

Vaipoa is one of three villages on the island of Niuatoputapu in Tonga. The population is 172.

The other two villages on Niuatoputapu are Hihifo, which is the main village on the island, and Falehau.

Niuatoputapu was extensively damaged in the 2009 Samoa earthquake and tsunami with a number of fatalities.

The tsunami followed an earthquake of an 8.0 M_{w} earthquake in the Samoan Islands region at 06:48:11 local time on 29 September 2009 (17:48:11 UTC).
