= St. John's Military School =

Private boarding school in Salina, Kansas, United States

Coordinates: 38°51′44″N 97°36′37″W

Location
- 110 W Otis Avenue; Salina, Kansas 67401; United States

Information
- Type: Private, College-prep,Boarding; Military school
- Motto: Scientia, Virtus, Disciplina (Knowledge, Valor/Courage/Character, Self-Control and Determination)
- Religious affiliation: Episcopal
- Established: 1887
- Closed: 2019
- President: D. Dale Browning
- Chaplain: Randy McIntosh
- Grades: 6–12
- Gender: Boys
- Enrollment: 113 Cadets (2016-2017)
- Colors: Orange and Black
- Team name: Mule Skinners
- Accreditation: NCA
- Website: sjms.org

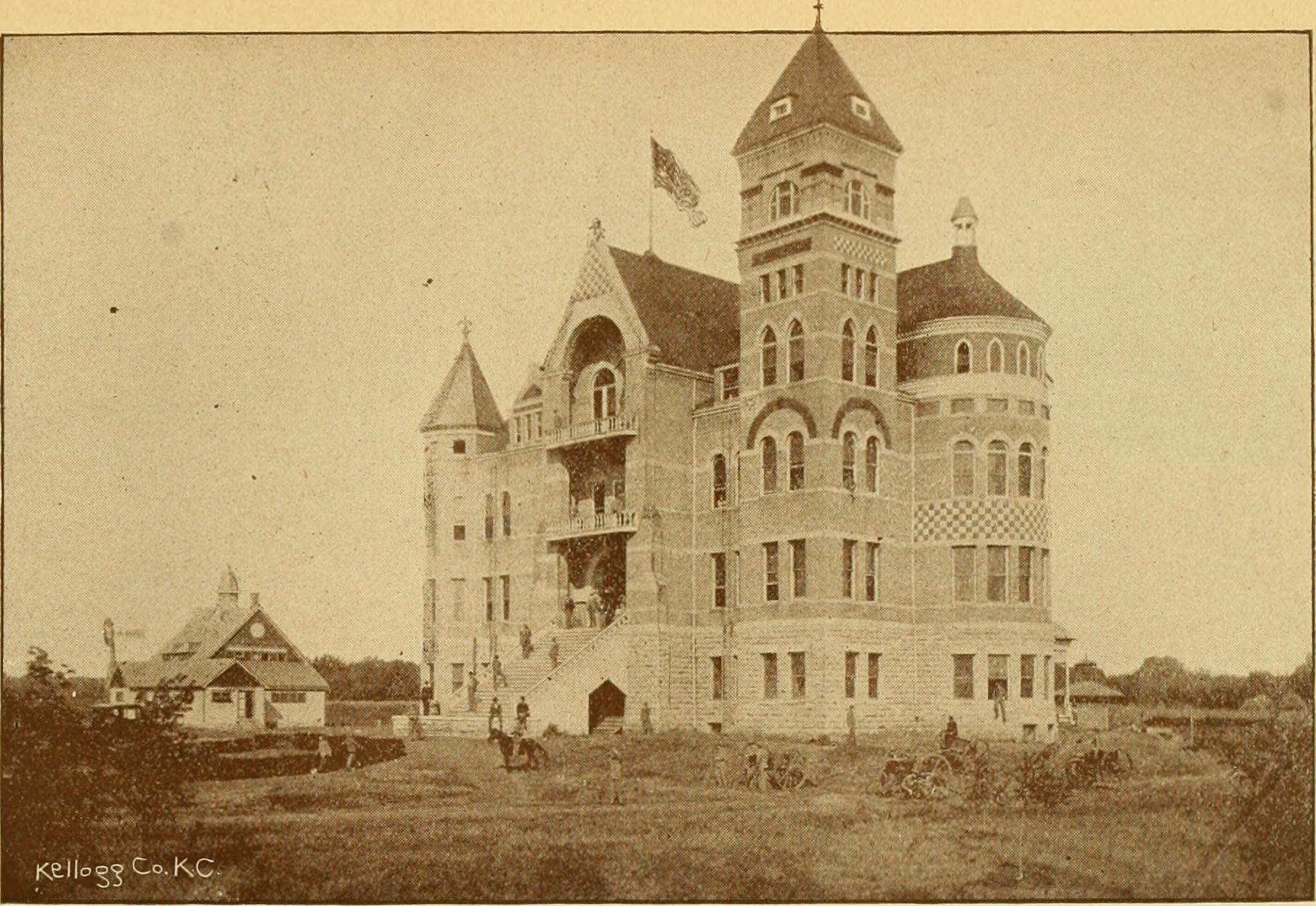
St. John's Military School (1890s)

St. John's Military School, located in Salina, Kansas, was a private boarding military school for male students from grades 6 to 12. It aimed to develop students' academic and leadership skills in a "military environment" overseen by a President, Academic Dean and Commandant of Cadets. It closed after the 2018–2019 academic year amid a decline in enrollment and multiple claims of abuse by previous students.

The school year ran from late August to early May. Honors classes are offered in English, Biology, and Social Studies. Advanced Placement classes for college credit were offered in English, Pre-Calculus, Chemistry, U.S. History, Government, and Computer Science. The school also had a comprehensive set of elective courses for students entering the work force upon graduation.

== History ==
St. John's was founded in 1887 by the Bishop of Kansas, Elisha Thomas, as an Episcopal boarding school for boys aged 8–18; it was preceded by Phillips Military School, which had been started by Colonel William Phillips, a founder of Salina. Salina Troop 1, one of the oldest Boy Scout troops in America, was organized on January 21, 1910, by F. John Romanes, an instructor at St. John's who reportedly knew Lord Baden-Powell, the British founder of Scouting, and also founded Scouting in Colorado Springs, Colorado. The school's original building, Vail Hall, was completed in 1888 and enlarged in 1904; it was destroyed by a fire in November 1978. Since 1979, the annual graduation ceremony includes a traditional passing around of the building's front door handle, retrieved from the fire wreckage.

The school was used in the filming of Up the Academy, a Mad magazine spoof about military boarding schools. The 1980 movie was filmed entirely in Salina, mostly on the school's campus.

=== Abuse claims ===
A wide range of abuse claims were filed against St. John's in a federal lawsuit in March 2012. An amended complaint was filed by six sets of parents on behalf of cadets from California, Florida, Tennessee, Colorado, Texas and Illinois. The lawsuit was settled with undisclosed terms in March 2014, just before the trial was to start. According to court records, as of June 2012 St. John's had settled fourteen previous abuse-related lawsuits filed since 2006.

A March 2013 report found 339 complaints of beatings, hazing, harassment, and abuse over five years, including of students being branded.|

In December 2018, St. John's was ordered by an arbitrator to pay $369,175 to the family of a student who was 11 years old in 2014 when he was bullied and sodomized by another student; the arbitrator found that in addition to inadequate and inappropriate management of students, the school had relaxed admission standards in response to declining enrollment.

== Accreditation and memberships ==
St. John's was accredited by AdvancED and the Kansas State Department of Education. It is a member of the National Association of Episcopal Schools and the Association of Military Colleges and Schools of the United States.

== Junior ROTC ==
The school had an Army JROTC. The JROTC Department also sponsored the rifle and drill teams.

The 125th Corps of Cadets received a perfect score of 1,000 points on their annual formal inspection. It was the first perfect score in the school's history, and very few military schools have ever received a perfect score. Previously, their highest score was a 999. The status as a JROTC Honor Unit with Distinction permits St. John's to make up to three recommendations to each of the five service academies: United States Merchant Marine Academy, United States Military Academy, United States Naval Academy, United States Coast Guard Academy, and United States Air Force Academy.

== Athletics and activities ==
St. John's competed on the junior varsity and varsity levels with other independent and public schools.

The interscholastic sports are:

- Football
- Soccer
- Cross Country
- Basketball
- Wrestling
- Golf
- Baseball
- Tennis
- Rifle Team

== Notable alumni ==
- Mark Cerney, founder of the Next of Kin Registry (NOKR) model
- Nicholas Dockery, Medal of Honor recipient
- Dean Hargrove, television producer, writer, and director
