= Hihifo =

Tongan Village

Coordinates: 15.953°S 173.796°W

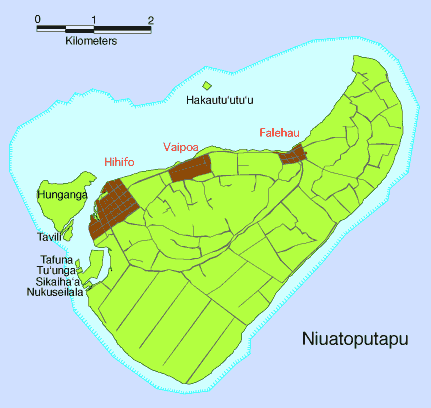
Map of Niuatoputapu Island

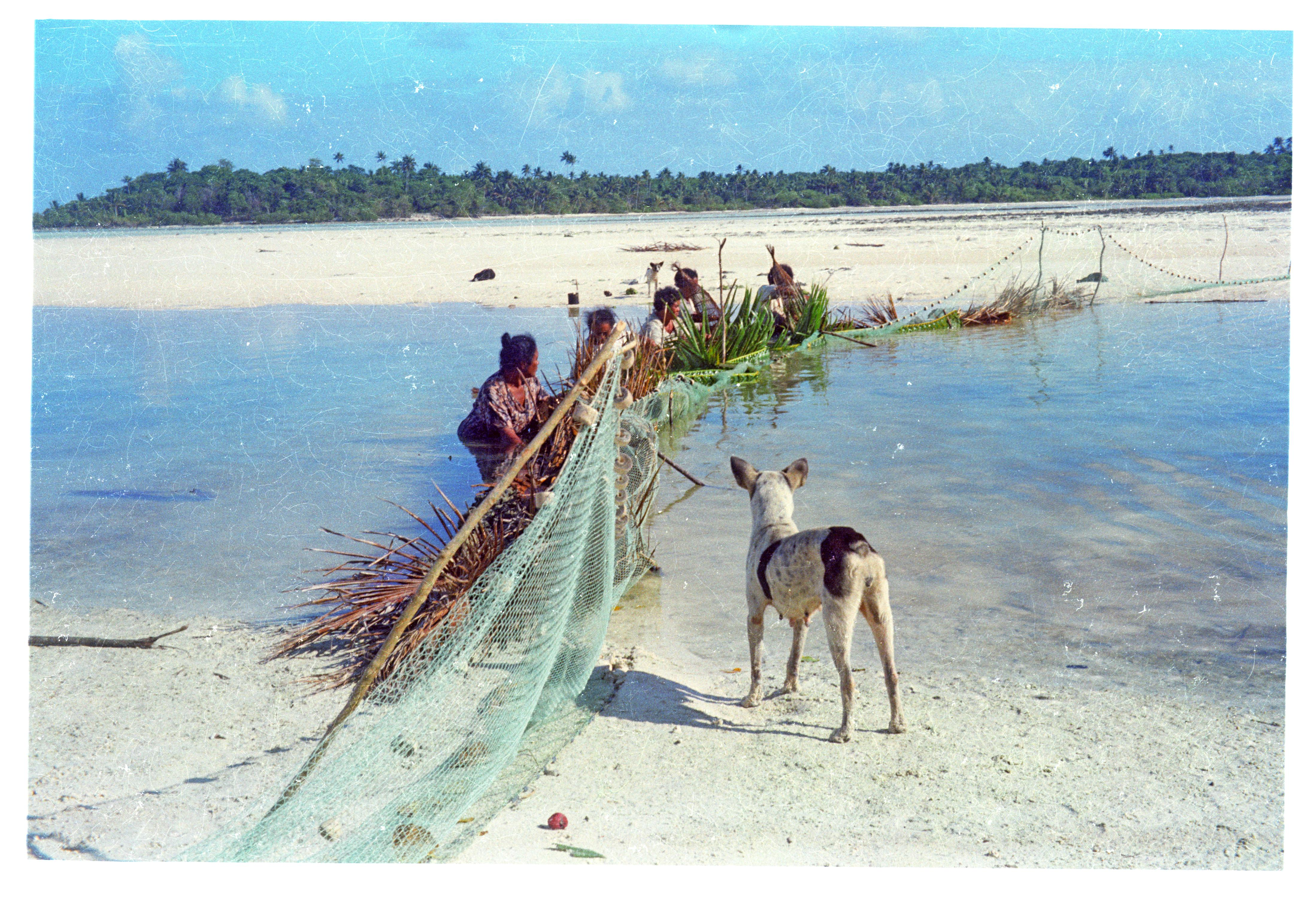
Women from the village of Hihifo fishing on Niuatoputapu in 1969.

Hihifo is the main village on the island of Niuatoputapu in the Kingdom of Tonga. Hihifo (which means 'west' in the Tongan language) is situated on the west side of Niuatoputapu and is the main centre for public and government facilities that serve the island residents, including a post office and police station. The other two villages on Niuatoputapu are Falehau and Vaipoa.

The population of the village is 301 (as of 2021).

== Overview ==
Hihifo was extensively damaged in the 2009 Samoa earthquake and tsunami with a number of fatalities. The tsunami followed an 8.0 M_{w} earthquake in the Samoan Islands region at 06:48:11 local time on September 29, 2009 (17:48:11 UTC).
