= Craig Fugate =

American federal administrator (born 1959)

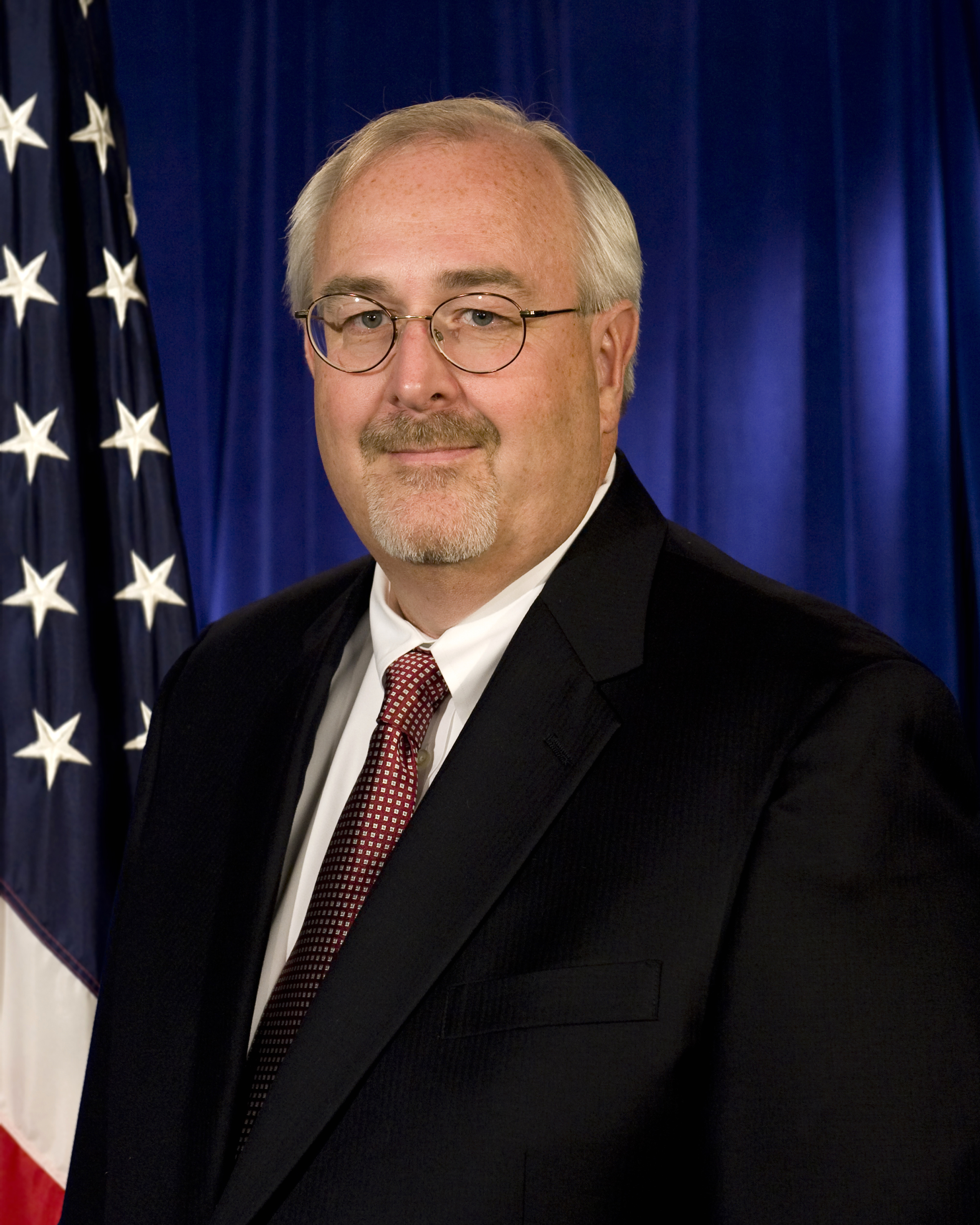

Administrator of the Federal Emergency Management Agency
- In office May 19, 2009 – January 20, 2017
- President: Barack Obama
- Preceded by: Nancy L. Ward (acting)
- Succeeded by: Robert J. Fenton (acting)

Personal details
- Born: William Craig Fugate; May 14, 1959 (age 67) Jacksonville, Florida, U.S.
- Party: Democratic
- Spouse: Sheree Fugate
- Education: Santa Fe College (attended)

William Craig Fugate (born May 14, 1959) is the former administrator of the Federal Emergency Management Agency. As director for the Florida Emergency Management Division, he oversaw the "Big 4 of '04" and as the administrator for the Federal Emergency Management Agency, he organized response and recovery efforts for a then record of ninety-nine major disasters in 2011.

== Early life ==
Fugate was born at Jacksonville Naval Air Station to William Roland Fugate, a senior chief petty officer in the U.S. Navy, and Carol Charlotte Fugate. In 1970 at the age of 11 he lost his mother, and then his father in 1974 at the age of 16. He attended high school at Santa Fe High School and trained as a volunteer firefighter, then attended fire college and paramedic school at Santa Fe College, began a job as an emergency paramedic and eventually rising to the rank of lieutenant with Alachua County Fire Rescue.

== Career ==
=== Emergency administrator ===
Beginning in 1987, he served for 10 years as an emergency manager for Alachua County before moving up to the state level as deputy director for the Florida Emergency Management Division and then became director in 2001 under Florida Republican governor Jeb Bush. The appointment from the opposing party was considered a favorable indication of the respect Fugate's career had earned. As director, he coordinated the state's response to Hurricane Charley, Hurricane Frances, Hurricane Ivan, and Hurricane Jeanne in 2004 and Hurricane Dennis, Hurricane Katrina, and Hurricane Wilma in 2005. He was criticized for the lack of ice, water, and other supplies distributed after Hurricane Wilma despite his warnings to those staying in the area to stock up on three days' worth of supplies. He was awarded the National Guard Association of Florida Hall of Fame in 2006.

==== Federal Emergency Management Agency ====
Fugate was considered for the position as director of the Federal Emergency Management Agency by president George W. Bush after sharp criticism and the resignation of Michael D. Brown. Later, due to Fugate's experience with Florida's extreme weather, he was appointed as the FEMA director in May 2009 by President Barack Obama. His nomination received bi-partisan support in Congress although Louisiana senator Republican David Vitter threatened to hold up his nomination until his concerns over the handling of Hurricane Katrina by Brown were answered by FEMA.

In 2010, as director of FEMA, he oversaw a record of eighty-one disaster declarations and superseded that record in 2011 with ninety-nine. He was criticized in 2012 by Brown for his early response to Hurricane Sandy in which he positioned recovery resources prior to the storm's arrival. In response, Fugate said that he "emphasized the importance of strong building codes and risk management before disasters strike".

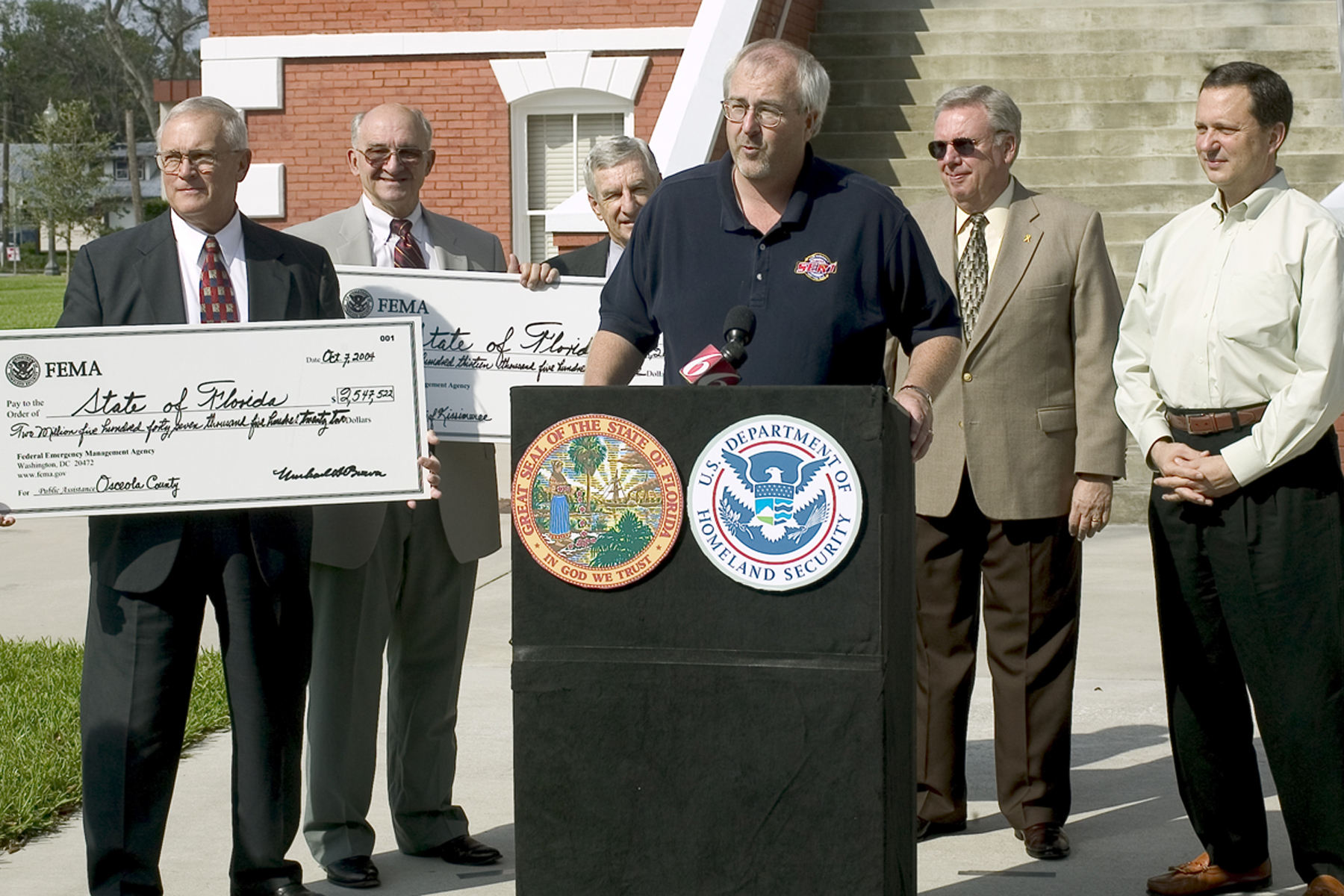
As director of the Florida Division of Emergency Management in 2004

==== Waffle House Index ====
Fugate is known for his "Waffle House Index", whereby he determines the level of attention a disaster area requires based on whether the Waffle House is open at the time emergency services arrive. Fugate told The New York Times that, "Waffle House has a very simple operation philosophy: get open." His theory is that if a Waffle House is open, keep driving. If it's damaged but serving a limited menu then the community needs help. If it's closed, then it means that the situation is really bad and needs the most attention. The strategy is particularly helpful in the South where Fugate is from, but becomes a challenge elsewhere where the Waffle House isn't as popular and local chains like Starbucks and Dunkin Donuts do not share the same "get open" philosophy.

==== Thunderbolt exercises ====
As administrator, Fugate instituted "thunderbolt exercises" into FEMA's preparations. Without notice, Fugate will walk into the emergency operations center and declare a fake disaster and the scenario obstacles.

==== Social media ====
Fugate spearheaded efforts to incorporate digital media into federal emergency management. He led the effort to develop smart phone apps allowing users to report disasters with photos and use GPS to identify the location.

=== Work after FEMA ===
In November 2020, Fugate was named a volunteer member of the Joe Biden presidential transition Agency Review Team to support transition efforts related to the Department of Homeland Security.

== Personal life ==
Fugate married his wife Sheree in 2002 and they currently live in Gainesville, Florida. Fugate enjoys sea kayaking. Outside of government he is also the founder of disastersrus.org, a website with disaster planning advice and links to disaster-related resources.

Fugate is a licensed amateur radio operator. His FCC call sign is KK4INZ. He earned his Technician Class license in 2010. He upgraded to General Class in 2014. He is a member of the Alexandria (VA) Amateur Radio Club. He was a keynote speaker at the 2014 ARRL Convention in Hartford, Connecticut.

Political offices
Preceded by Nancy L. Ward; Acting	Administrator of the Federal Emergency Management Agency; 2009–2017	Succeeded by Robert J. Fenton; Acting
