= Niuatoputapu =

Island of Tonga

Coordinates: 15°57′S 173°45′W

Location of Niuatoputapu in the Pacific Ocean

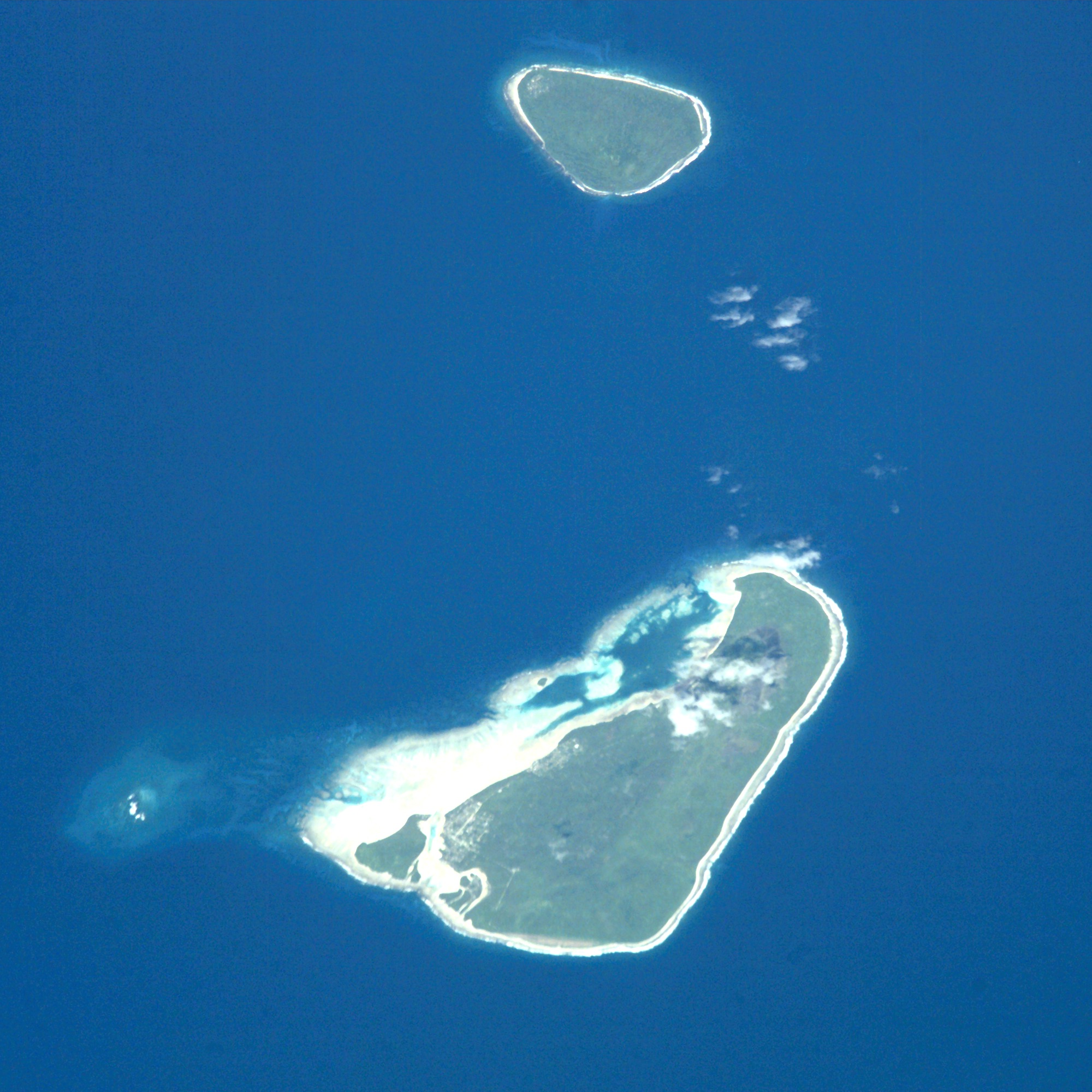
NASA picture of Niuatoputapu, with smaller Tafahi to the north.

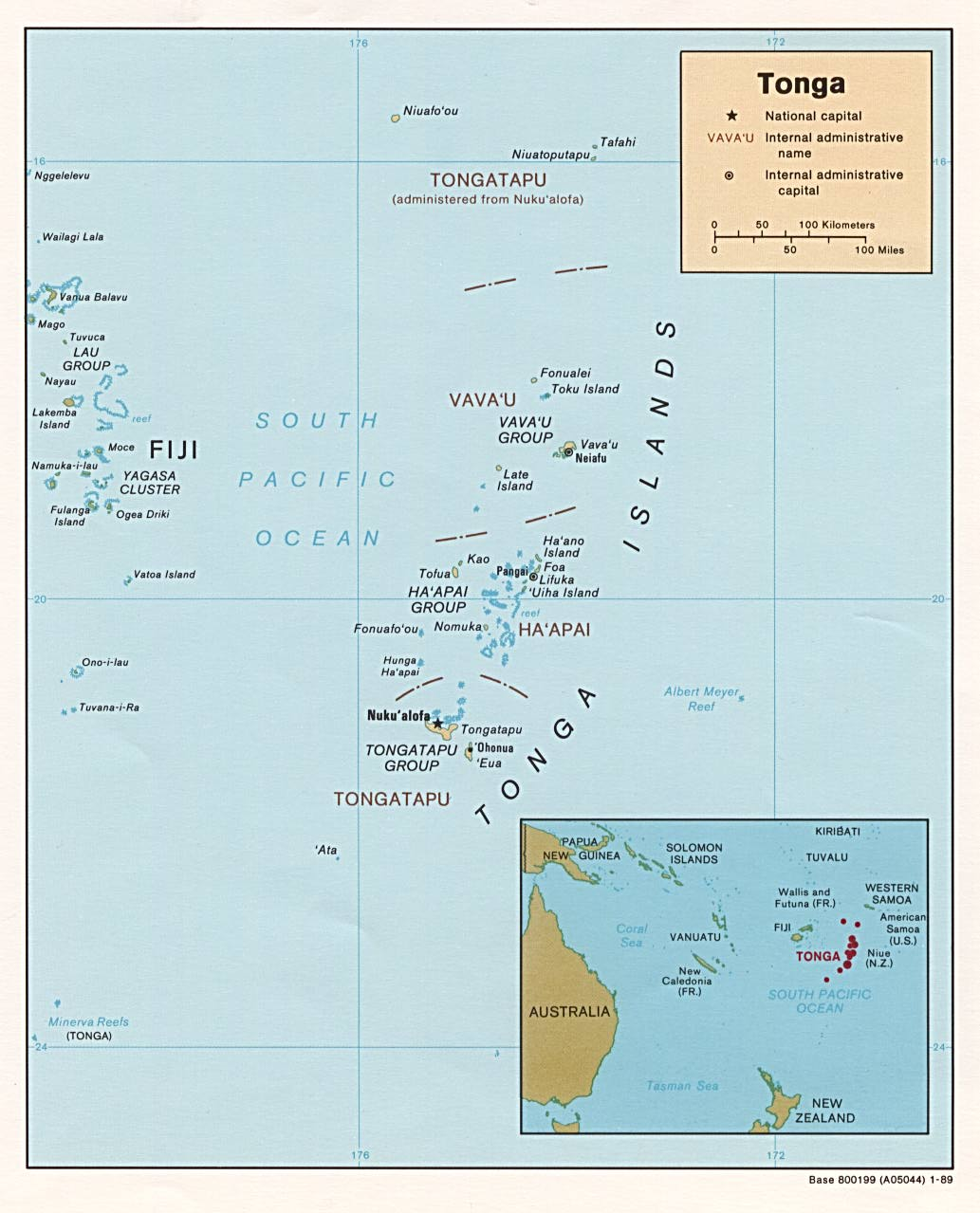
Located in Tongatupu to the very north of Tonga

Niuatoputapu (The Sacred Niua) is a volcanic island in the island nation of Tonga, Pacific Ocean. Its highest point is 157 metres (515 ft), and its area is 16 square kilometres (6.2 sq mi). Its name means sacred island. Other names for the island are Traitors Island or Keppel Island.

Niuatoputapu is located in the north of the Tonga island group, 300 kilometres (190 miles) away from Vavaʻu near the border with Samoa. Its closest neighbours are the small island of Tafahi, which is only 9 km (6 mi) to the north-northeast, and the island of Niuafo'ou. Those three islands together form the administrative division of the Niuas. Niuatoputapu Airport accepts international flights. The population was 719 in 2021. Until several centuries ago, the inhabitants spoke the Niuatoputapu language, but it was replaced by the Tongan language and went extinct. Nevertheless, the variety of Tongan spoken on Niuatoputapu contains elements of Samoan, ʻUvean, and Futunan.

== Geography ==
Niuatoputapu's highest central area, just beside Vaipoa, is a hill only 157 m (515 ft) high. It is the eroded remnant of a large volcano, which last erupted about 3 million years ago. The island is almost entirely surrounded by a large reef, uplifted, and largely covered with volcanic ash, which has proved an island with fertile soil.

In late September or early October 1886 the French steamer Decres notified authorities in Fiji that it had witnessed a volcanic eruption on Niuatoputapu.

Niuatoputapu consists primarily of three villages: Hihifo (meaning "west" in Tongan), Vaipoa, and Falehau. Hihifo is the largest village, and, as its name suggests, it lies in the western part of the island. It has most of the local governmental facilities, including the post office, telecommunications, police station, and a high school. There are primary schools in all three villages. Vaipoa lies in the middle of the island. Falehau, which is east of Vaipoa, fronts on the island's only harbor, on the northwest coast.

== History ==
The traditional line of lords of the island is the Māʻatu dynasty. According to the legends, an early member of them became the fish god Seketoʻa.

Niuatoputapu was put on the European maps by Willem Schouten and Jacob Le Maire during their famous circumnavigation of the globe in their ship the Eendracht (Unity) in 1616. After successful bartering with the inhabitants of Tafahi, but not finding a suitable anchorage there, they proceeded to its bigger southern neighbour. There their reception was less peaceful. Natives boarded their ship and attacked the Dutch with clubs, until they found out what muskets were and could do. After that an uneasy truce existed, enabling the barter of more coconuts, ubes roots (probably ʻufi (yam)), hogs and water. A 'king' of the island came along, but not on board. "He was equally naked with all the rest", only distinguishable by the respect the islanders paid to him. The next day the Dutch felt that something was in the air, and indeed when the king came along again he suddenly ordered his people into an attack. There were about 700 to 800 of them in 23 double canoes and 45 single canoes. But the Dutch fired their muskets and 3 cannons, and the islanders then quickly made themselves scarce. Schouten and LeMaire continued their westwards trip, leaving Verraders (Traitors) island behind.

Historical population
Year	Pop.	±%
1996	1,161	—
2006	1,019	−12.2%
2011	759	−25.5%
2016	739	−2.6%
2021	719	−2.7%

== In popular culture ==
The 2001 film The Other Side of Heaven depicts the LDS missionary efforts of John Groberg on Niuatoputapu. The film was, however, filmed on Rarotonga in the Cook Islands and in Auckland, New Zealand.

== 2009 tsunami ==
The island of Niuatoputapu was affected by the magnitude 8 2009 Samoa earthquake and resulting tsunami that occurred in the region of the Samoa Islands region, at 06:48:11 local time on 29 September. (17:48:11 UTC). 46 percent of the island was inundated, and more than half the buildings on the island were destroyed. Nine people were killed in Hihifo.

== See also ==
Cyprus mutiny
