= R. David Paulison =

American fire chief

David Paulison
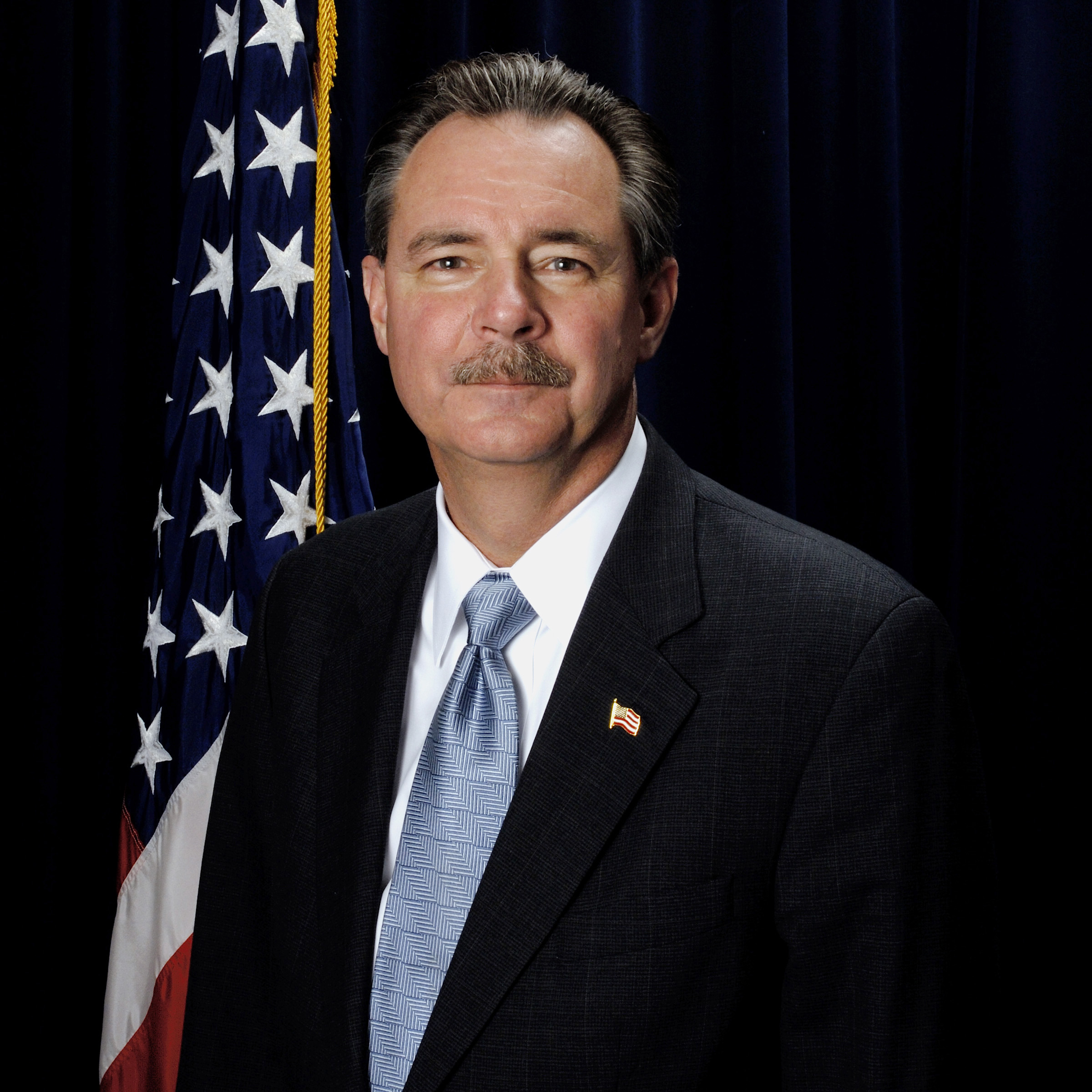
- Paulison in 2006

Administrator of the Federal Emergency Management Agency
- In office September 12, 2005 – January 21, 2009; Acting: September 12, 2005 – June 8, 2006
- President: George W. Bush
- Preceded by: Michael D. Brown
- Succeeded by: Nancy L. Ward (acting)

Personal details
- Born: February 27, 1947 (age 79) Miami, Florida, U.S.
- Party: Democratic
- Education: Florida Atlantic University (BA)

Robert David Paulison (born February 27, 1947) is an American former fire chief who served as the director of the Federal Emergency Management Agency (FEMA). Paulison was appointed by President George W. Bush on September 12, 2005, to replace the embattled Michael D. Brown, who resigned amid controversy over his handling of disaster relief in the aftermath of Hurricane Katrina. Prior to his appointment, Paulison was perhaps best known nationally for his 2003 advisory regarding household items (including duct tape and plastic sheeting) to have on hand in case of terrorist attack. At the 2009 National Hurricane Conference, he announced he would resign January 21, 2009.

== Biography ==
Paulison was born in 1947 in Miami, Florida. He attended North Miami Senior High School and earned his bachelor's degree from Florida Atlantic University, and later completed a program at John F. Kennedy School of Government at Harvard University for government service executives. After beginning his career as a firefighter, Paulison rose through the ranks, and became fire chief of Miami-Dade Fire Rescue in 1992. He was subsequently named fire chief of the year for Florida in 1993, and has thirty years of experience as a firefighter. In addition, he was also president of the International Association of Fire Chiefs.

During his time as a firefighter, Paulison was responsible for the cleanup after Hurricane Andrew in 1992 and after the crash of ValuJet Flight 592 over the Everglades in 1996.

On September 20, 2001, President George W. Bush announced that he would appoint Paulison (a Democrat) as the head of the United States Fire Administration, now a division of the Department of Homeland Security (DHS) and the Directorate of Preparedness. The nomination was sent to the U.S. Senate on October 16, 2001. Paulison was confirmed unanimously on November 30, 2001.

It was not in this role, rather he had also been made Director of FEMA's Preparedness Division, that Paulison released an advisory on February 10, 2003, recommending households keep several common items on hand in case of a biological, chemical or radiological terrorist attack. Among these: three days' worth of water and food, emergency supplies, and plastic sheeting and duct tape to seal windows and doors. The latter led to a much-publicized rush on hardware stores. This overshadowed another of the advisory's statements (one that unknowingly predicted conditions in the Gulf Coast 19 months later): in an emergency, most people "are going to be on their own for possibly 48 to 72 hours."

Later in 2003, Bush appointed Paulison director of the newly created National Preparedness Division of the Emergency Preparedness & Response Directorate. This distinctly DHS Directorate, was later made a part of FEMA again almost two years after Paulison became FEMA's acting "chief", Department of Homeland Security.

In April 2006, Acting FEMA Director and U.S. Fire Administrator Paulison was nominated to become the first DHS Under Secretary for Federal Emergency Management in charge of FEMA. Later, in May 2006, Paulison was unanimously confirmed and sworn in on June 8, 2006, as the first Under Secretary for Federal Emergency Management.

In April 2008 The Miami Herald had reported that Paulison was considering resigning, which was repudiated by the Under Secretary while testifying before the Senate Homeland Security Committee. Paulison noted that the newspaper had "misunderstood his statements", and that he was instead attempting to get the agency prepared for the incoming Obama administration appointee.

On January 21, 2009, Paulison announced his resignation.

Sources at the Miami Herald noted that rumors had been swirling that he was "tired" and "disillusioned" and would resign soon but that the White House was pressuring him to stay on. When asked by reporters if he would consider staying on at the request of the new president and he responded: "probably not."

Paulison selected Nancy L. Ward, then a FEMA regional director (for region IX, which serves Arizona, California, Guam, Hawaii, Nevada, Northern Mariana Islands, Marshall Islands, Federated States of Micronesia and American Samoa), to be interim director after his resignation took effect.

== See also ==
- List of U.S. political appointments that crossed party lines

Political offices
Preceded by Michael D. Brown	Administrator of the Federal Emergency Management Agency; 2005–2009; Acting: 2005–2006	Succeeded by Nancy L. Ward; Acting
