= Michael D. Brown =

Director of the U.S. Federal Emergency Management Agency from 2003 to 2005

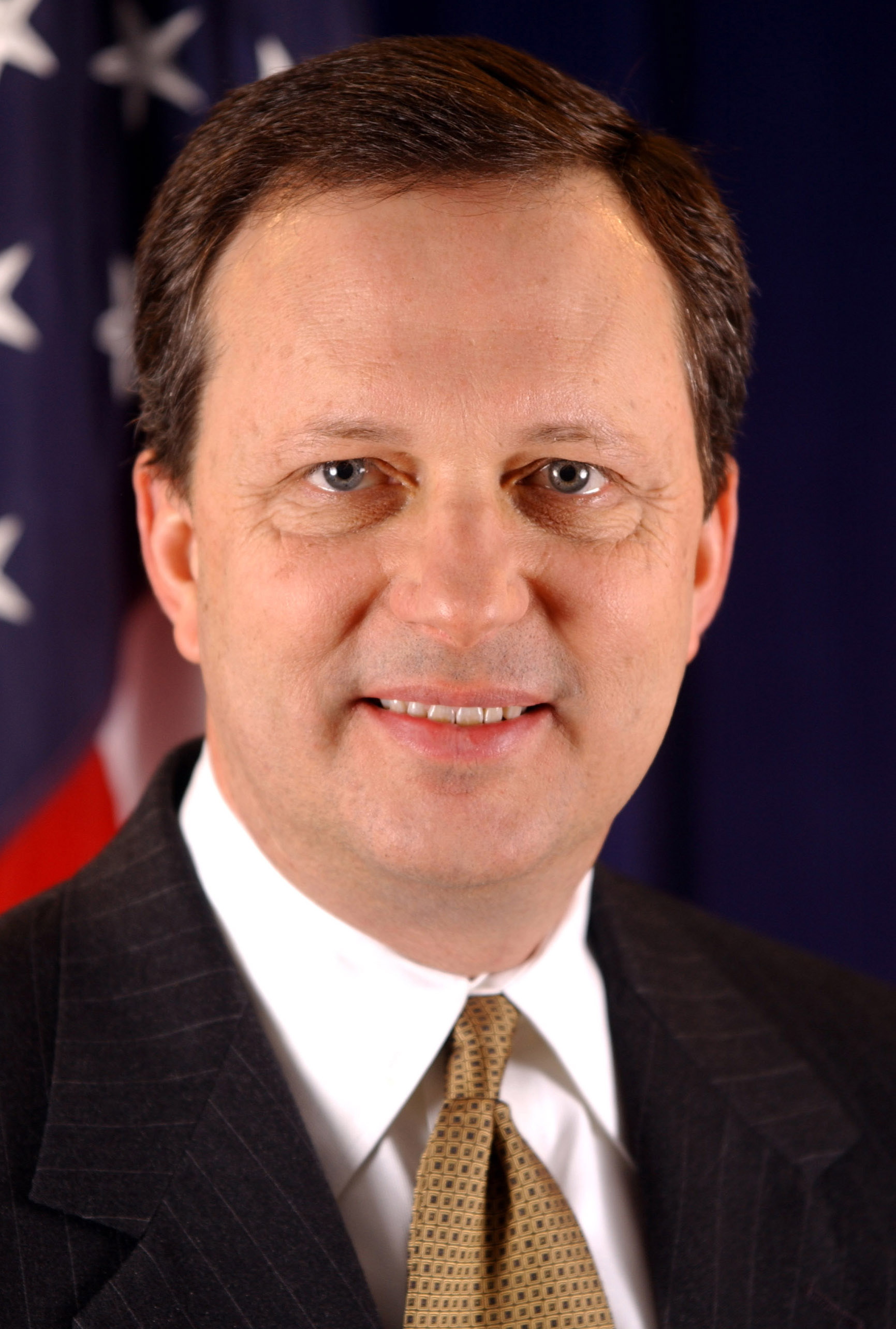
- Official portrait, 2003

Administrator of the Federal Emergency Management Agency
- In office March 15, 2003 – September 12, 2005
- President: George W. Bush
- Preceded by: Joe Allbaugh
- Succeeded by: R. David Paulison

Personal details
- Born: Michael DeWayne Brown; November 8, 1954 (age 71) Guymon, Oklahoma U.S.
- Party: Republican
- Education: University of Central Oklahoma (BA); Oklahoma City University (JD)

Michael DeWayne Brown (born November 8, 1954) is an American attorney, and former government official who served as the administrator of the Federal Emergency Management Agency (FEMA) from 2003 to 2005. He joined FEMA as general counsel in 2001 and became deputy director the same year. Appointed in January 2003 by President George W. Bush to lead FEMA, Brown resigned in September 2005 following his controversial handling of Hurricane Katrina. Brown currently hosts a radio talk show on 630 KHOW in Denver, Colorado.

== Early life ==
Brown was born on November 8, 1954, in Guymon, Oklahoma, the son of Eloise (Ferguson) and Wayne Ellsworth Brown. He received a B.A. in public administration/political science from the Central State University (now the University of Central Oklahoma). He received his J.D. from Oklahoma City University School of Law in 1981.

While he was in college, from 1975 to 1978, he handled labor and budget matters as an assistant to the city manager of Edmond, Oklahoma. His White House biography stated that he had emergency services oversight in this position. However, the head of public relations for the city denied that Brown had oversight over anybody and that "the assistant is more like an intern." She said, "Mike used to handle a lot of details. Every now and again, I'd ask him to write me a speech. He was very loyal. He was always on time. He always had on a suit and a starched white shirt." However, Claudia Deakins, the spokesperson for the City of Edmond, submitted information to the House Committee investigating Hurricane Katrina that Time Magazine, which described his resume as "padded," had taken her quotes out of context, and erroneously reported Brown's position at the City of Edmond. The former Mayor of Edmond, Carl Reherman, and the former City Attorney, Mary Ann Karns, each submitted affidavits to the House investigating committee showing that Brown did have emergency management experience.

While attending law school, Brown was appointed by the Chairman of the Senate Finance Committee of the Oklahoma Legislature as the Finance Committee Staff Director, where he oversaw state fiscal issues from 1980 to 1982. In 1981, he was elected to the city council for Edmond, but resigned to work in private practice.

== Law career ==
Later in the 1980s, Brown lived in Enid, Oklahoma and practiced law there. During the Hurricane Katrina controversy, Stephen Jones, the senior partner and founder of the firm for which Brown worked, described him as "not serious and somewhat shallow" and stated that he had handled "transactional," rather than litigation work. Brown later went into solo practice.

He also taught at Oklahoma City University law school as an adjunct lecturer – although his FindLaw profile falsely misrepresented his occupation at that time as an "Outstanding Political Science Professor". From 1982 to 1988, he was the chairman of the Board of the Oklahoma Municipal Power Authority.

Brown ran for Congress in 1988 against Democratic incumbent Glenn English, who had not been challenged in the previous election. English's well-financed campaign soundly defeated Brown with 122,763 votes against 45,199. After losing, Brown promised to try again in 1990, saying, "I have an excellent chance of prevailing. It's a Democratic state, but a very Republican district." However, Brown did not run in 1990, and English beat his Republican opponent, Robert Burns, 110,100 votes to 27,540.

== IAHA tenure ==
Brown was the Judges and Stewards Commissioner for the International Arabian Horse Association from 1989 to 2001. After numerous lawsuits were filed against the organization over disciplinary actions that Brown took against members violating the association's code of ethics, Brown resigned and negotiated a buy-out of his contract.

A March 2000 two-part report in the St. Louis Post-Dispatch, chronicling one of the disciplinary actions, lauded Brown for pursuing an investigation against David Boggs, "the kingpin of the Arabian horse world", despite internal pressure to end the inquiry. The Brown-led investigation found Boggs performed medically unnecessary surgery on horses to enhance their visual appeal. An ethics board suspended Boggs for five years. Boggs protested through multiple lawsuits against both the organization and Brown, alleging slander and defamation. Brown and the International Arabian Horse Association prevailed in each of the lawsuits brought by Boggs, but the lawsuits nonetheless took a financial toll. Some members interviewed felt Brown showed an imperious attitude, and nicknamed him "The Czar."

Brown started his own legal defense fund before resigning, a move he said was necessary to protect his family's assets. However, some insiders claimed that this was what really led to his ousting. He raised money from breeders for the fund as well as the International Arabian Horse Association, creating what some called a conflict of interest. Despite his contract stipulating that association was to pay all his personal legal expenses, on top of his $100,000 annual salary, the association initially refused to pay the legal bills. It was claimed that Brown created the legal defense fund on the advice of the association's own legal counsel.

== Bush administration service ==
After President Bush entered office in January 2001, Brown joined FEMA as general counsel. He was the first person hired by his long-time friend, FEMA director Joe Allbaugh, who also ran Bush's election campaign in 2000. Allbaugh later named Brown his acting deputy director in September 2001. Bush formally nominated him as deputy director on March 22, 2002, and the Senate confirmed him many months later, after the September 11th attacks recovery effort in New York had subsided. Brown oversaw the recovery efforts for New York and surrounding states with the White House Office of Domestic Policy's Reuben Jeffery III who later became chairman of the Commodity Futures Trading Commission.

Prior to his nomination as undersecretary, the White House appointed Brown to head a transition team creating the Emergency Preparedness & Response Directorate within Department of Homeland Security. Before that, shortly after the September 11 attacks, Brown served on the Consequence Management Principals' Committee, which acted as the White House's policy coordination group for the federal domestic response to the attacks. Later, Bush asked him to head the Consequence Management Working Group to identify and resolve key issues regarding the federal response plan.

In August 2002, Bush appointed Brown to the Transition Planning Office for the new Department of Homeland Security, serving as the transition leader for the Emergency Preparedness and Response Division. As undersecretary, Brown also directed the National Incident Management System Integration Center, the National Disaster Medical System and the Nuclear Incident Response Team. After Bush announced the creation of the Department of Homeland Security, Allbaugh left government and Bush nominated Brown in January 2003 for the directorship of FEMA. Brown was sworn into his position on April 15, 2003.

On August 31, 2005, following Hurricane Katrina being named an "Incident of National Significance", Brown was named the Principal Federal Official and placed in charge of the federal government's response by Homeland Security Director Michael Chertoff. At the Mobile (Alabama) Regional Airport on September 2, 2005, President Bush, who had appointed Brown in 2003, praised him shortly after the storm hit, saying "Brownie, you're doing a heck of a job."

Following criticism for what some perceived as a lack of planning and coordination, on September 7, 2005, Coast Guard Chief of Staff Vice Admiral Thad Allen was named Brown's deputy and given operational control of search and rescue and recovery efforts. On September 9, 2005, Chertoff relieved Brown of all on-site relief duties along the Gulf Coast, officially replacing him with Vice Admiral Allen, and sending Brown back to Washington to continue FEMA's central operations. Brown told the Associated Press that "the press" was making him a scapegoat for the slow federal response to the hurricane.

=== Resignation from FEMA ===
On September 12, 2005, in the wake of what was widely believed to be incompetent handling of the aftermath of Hurricane Katrina by state, local and federal officials, Brown resigned, saying that it was "in the best interest of the agency and best interest of the president."

Brown's standing had also been damaged when the Boston Herald revealed his meager experience in disaster management before joining FEMA. Shortly after his resignation the Associated Press obtained a videotape of Brown briefing Bush, Governor Blanco, Mayor Nagin and others in which he questioned the wisdom of the Mayor's use of the Louisiana Superdome as a "shelter of last resort" and questioning the structural integrity of the Superdome.

At least one source, The Economist, suggested that Brown had been "pushed" out by the administration rather than having resigned voluntarily, although internal e-mails from Brown indicated that he was already planning to leave FEMA at the time Katrina hit. The same suggestion was made by at least one member of Congress during a hearing on what went wrong during Katrina. Brown concentrated his testimony at that hearing on alleging that Louisiana Governor Kathleen Blanco and New Orleans Mayor Ray Nagin bore most, if not all, of the blame for the failures in the response to Katrina, and that his only fault had been not to realize sooner their inability to perform their respective duties.

Although Brown resigned as Director, he remained undersecretary of Emergency Preparedness and Response. Chertoff granted Brown two 30-day contract extensions in order not to "sacrifice the real ability to get a full picture of Mike's experiences." Brown continued to receive his $148,000 annual salary until November 2, 2005, when he left in the middle of the second 30-day extension.

On November 2, 2005, Brown ended his contract early (it had been extended to mid-November by Chertoff) and left the federal government. On January 18, 2006, Brown stated that certain things could have been handled differently, such as calling in the military. As one of the largest natural disasters to ever strike the U.S., he stated, "It was beyond the capacity of the state and local governments, and it was beyond the capacity of FEMA." On February 10, 2006, Brown again testified before Congress, this time placing blame on the Department of Homeland Security for the poor handling of the disaster, asserting that the anti-terrorism focus of the department had caused it to deny resources needed to properly operate FEMA. In his February 2006 testimony, Brown also contradicted earlier claims that the White House was unaware of levees having been breached, stating: "For them to claim that we didn't have awareness of it is just baloney."

On March 1, 2006, AP released a recording of Brown and Bush in a video conference in which the vulnerability of the levee system was raised with a great deal of concern over potential loss of life. Bush denied any awareness of the possibility of a levee-related catastrophe in an interview.

== Post-FEMA activities ==
=== Work for InferX Company ===
Brown began as an adviser to a publicly traded company, InferX, which claimed its technology is the answer to US security concerns, as well as the credibility problems of the Department of Homeland Security and Federal Emergency Management Agency.

Brown had been on the media circuit talking about technology that claims to screen for terror suspects, track threats in shipping containers and cargo hauling, and gather data for law enforcement tracking.

In December 2007, Brown was named CEO of InferX.

In April 2008, Brown was appointed to the board of directors.

On May 9, 2008, Brown and others left the company pending sale of InferX to another investor.

=== Work for Cotton Companies ===
As of 2007, Brown worked for Cotton Companies, a private firm specializing in disaster recovery. Throughout 2007 and early 2008 Brown made appearances to the press on behalf of Cotton companies. In these appearances, he referred to the lessons that he had learned from his experiences as the head of FEMA during Hurricane Katrina.

=== Next of Kin Registry NOKR ===
In July 2009, Brown became the CEO of the Next of Kin Registry, an NGO in Washington DC. NOKR is a central depository for Emergency Contact information in the United States plus 87 other countries. The NGO is all volunteer driven.

=== Work for Cold Creek Solutions ===
On August 28, 2009, it was announced via press release emails "Former FEMA Director Michael Brown Joins Cold Creek Solutions, Offers Consulting Practice for Disaster Recovery" and also subsequently reported that Brown had joined Cold Creek Solutions as VP, Disaster Recovery Practice.

=== Radio talk show host ===
Brown filled in at various times on Denver radio station KOA after leaving government service. In February 2010 he was named the host of the Michael Brown Show from 7–10 pm weeknights on KOA, when not preempted by sports. Brown has embraced the criticism received during his handling of FEMA and has indicated that this gives him insight into when government fails. In mid-2012 Brown teamed up with Denver liberal KKZN host David Sirota for KHOW's Sirota-Brown show for KHOW's afternoon drive slot, but now hosts his own show, again called the Michael Brown Show. Politically, on the program, Brown describes himself as "very clearly center-right, conservative, with a strong libertarian bent."

=== Author ===
Brown co-authored a book, Deadly Indifference: The Perfect (Political) Storm: Hurricane Katrina, The Bush White House, and Beyond, about his experiences during Hurricane Katrina. The book was released June 16, 2011 and is published by Taylor Trade Publishing. Brown criticizes the performance of numerous people, including Bush, Trent Lott, Dennis Hastert, Ray Nagin, and Jesse Jackson, and critiques his own performance by stating that he failed to be ready for the press and was too timid in his response.

== FEMA controversies and criticism ==
=== Hurricane Frances ===
In 2004, FEMA disbursed $30 million in disaster relief funds for Hurricane Frances to residents of Miami, Florida, where damage from Hurricane Frances was minimal. Brown admitted to $12 million in overpayments, but denied any serious mistakes, blaming a computer glitch. After investigating, the South Florida Sun-Sentinel wrote that Brown was responsible and called for him to be fired.

In January 2005, U.S. Rep. Robert Wexler (D-FL) publicly urged Bush to fire Brown, citing the Sun-Sentinel's report. Wexler repeated his call in April to Chertoff, citing new reports that FEMA sent inspectors with criminal records of robbery and embezzlement to do damage assessments.

=== Hurricane Katrina ===
In the aftermath of Hurricane Katrina, many Democratic politicians called for Brown to be fired immediately, including California Rep. Nancy Pelosi, Maryland Senator Barbara Mikulski, New York Senators Hillary Clinton and Chuck Schumer, Colorado Senator Ken Salazar, Michigan Rep. Carolyn Cheeks Kilpatrick and Senator Debbie Stabenow, Louisiana State Rep. Peter Sullivan, Nevada Senator Harry Reid, Delaware Senator Joe Biden, and Illinois Senator Dick Durbin.

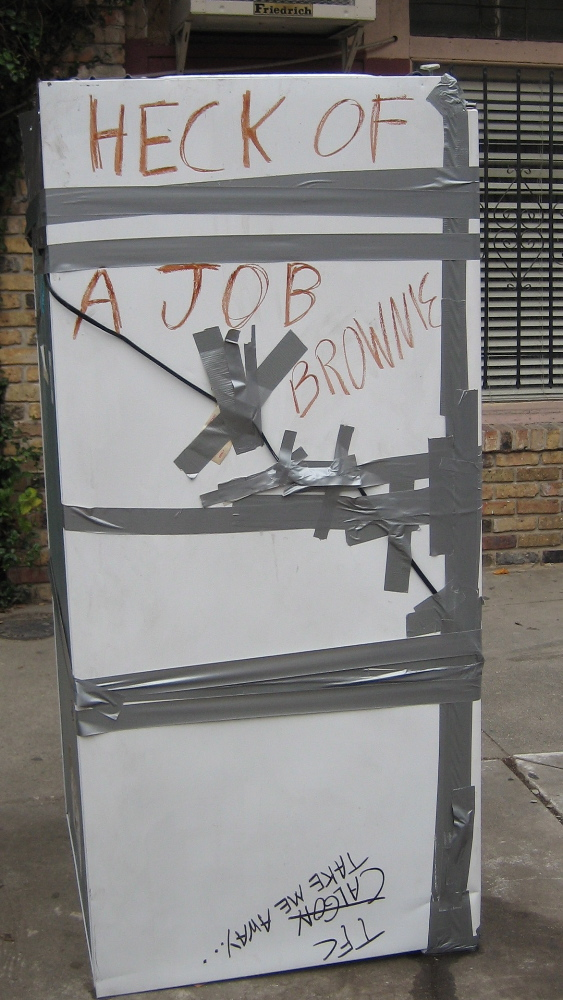
Post-Katrina, many New Orleanians added graffiti to their trashed appliances set on curbs to be hauled away. Here a refrigerator inscription satirizes Bush's "Heck of a job" praise for Brown.

Republican politicians such as Senator Trent Lott have also criticized Brown's leadership of FEMA. Brown's performance was defended, however, by Republicans such as former New York City Mayor Rudy Giuliani, Florida Governor Jeb Bush and former presidential speechwriter Pat Buchanan.

President Bush remarked "Brownie, you're doing a heck of a job" while touring Louisiana. "Heck of a job" soon became sarcastic slang for things done by politically connected cronies or general incompetence.

On August 29, 2005, five hours after the hurricane hit land, Brown made his first request for Homeland Security rescue workers to be deployed to the disaster area only after two days of training. He also told fire and rescue departments outside affected areas to refrain from providing trucks or emergency workers without a direct appeal from state or local governments in order to avoid coordination problems and the accusation of overstepping federal authority.

On September 1, 2005, Brown told Soledad O'Brien of CNN that he was unaware that New Orleans' officials had housed thousands of evacuees, who quickly ran out of food and water, in the Convention Center—even though major news outlets had been reporting on the evacuees' plight for at least a day. He also criticized those that were stuck in New Orleans as those "who chose not to evacuate, who chose not to leave the city" (disobeying a mandatory evacuation order).

On September 2, 2005, Chicago Mayor Richard M. Daley stated that he pledged firefighters, police officers, health department workers, and other resources on behalf of the city, but was only asked to send one tank truck.

Gail Collins, at the time editor of The New York Times' editorial page, called Brown "legendary as a disaster in his own right", and on Thanksgiving week in 2005, Brown was No. 1 on CNN's "Political Turkey of the Year" list for his handling of Katrina.

On August 28, 2007, Democratic presidential candidate John Edwards proposed what he called "Brownie's Law" requiring that "qualified people, not political hacks", lead key federal agencies.

=== E-mails ===
Brown's email messages were requested by a congressional house committee in November 2005 to investigate the federal government's handling of the Katrina disaster. Controversy arose when the approximately 1,000 e-mail messages between Brown, staff and acquaintances were released. Several of Brown's emails were criticised for a lack of professionalism.

On the day Katrina struck, Brown wrote "Can I quit now? Can I go home?" He later quipped to a friend on September 2 that he could not meet her because he was "trapped [as FEMA head] ... please rescue me."; and at another time "If you'll look at my lovely FEMA attire, you'll really vomit. I am a fashion god." In another e-mail, Brown's press secretary, Sharon Worthy, advised him to roll up his sleeves "to look more hard-working... Even the president rolled his sleeves to just below the elbow." An e-mail offering critical medical equipment went unanswered for four days.

== Brown criticism of the Obama administration ==
=== Deepwater Horizon oil spill ===
Speaking about the Deepwater Horizon oil spill in May 2010, Brown declared:

"This is exactly what they want, because now he can pander to the environmentalists and say, 'I'm gonna shut it down because it's too dangerous,'" ... "This president has never supported big oil, he's never supported offshore drilling, and now he has an excuse to shut it back down."

In contrast to Brown's claim, Obama had proposed a few weeks earlier major expansions of offshore oil and gas drilling as part of his "all of the above" energy policy. The spill did result in a spike in opposition to drilling among environmentalists, and the President did declare a 6-month moratorium on oil and gas drilling so that new safety measures could be put in place, resulting in loss of Republican support for major climate change legislation.

=== Hurricane Sandy ===
Brown criticized President Obama for responding to Hurricane Sandy faster than he responded to the attack on American diplomatic facilities at Benghazi, Libya. He also stated that he thought that President Obama was overplaying the likely threat from Sandy, and that the storm had hardly formed. He also noted "The storm was still forming, people were debating whether it was going to be as bad as expected, or not, and I noted that the president should have let the governors and mayors deal with the storm until it got closer to hitting the coastal areas along the Washington, D.C.–New York City corridor."

In an interview with Denver Westword, Brown said: "One thing [President Obama's] gonna be asked is, why did he jump on [Hurricane Sandy] so quickly and go back to D.C. so quickly when in ... Benghazi, he went to Las Vegas? Why was this so quick? ... At some point, somebody's going to ask that question."

Washington Post opinion writer Alexandra Petri responded that the Benghazi attack was unforeseen, whereas the hurricane was forecast well in advance. Petri found the criticism ironic given Brown's own too-slow response to Katrina, and unjustified given that Republican New Jersey governor Chris Christie was praising Obama's response. Sandy caused 71 deaths and tens of billions of dollars of damage in the United States.

== Recent activities ==
In 2025, Brown re-entered national discussions on emergency management, advocating for the Federal Emergency Management Agency (FEMA) to be removed from the Department of Homeland Security (DHS) and restored as an independent agency reporting directly to the president. He argued that FEMA's placement within DHS added bureaucratic delays that weakened disaster response and emphasized that state and local governments should assume greater responsibility instead of depending heavily on federal funding.

Brown discussed these proposals in several media appearances, including interviews with NewsNation and The Hill, especially in response to criticisms of FEMA's performance following Hurricanes Helene and Milton.

Brown continues to host his nationally syndicated radio and podcast programs, including The Situation and The Weekend with Michael Brown, where he comments on politics, culture, and current events from his perspective as a former federal official.

== See also ==
- Criticism of the government response to Hurricane Katrina

Political offices
Preceded by Joe Allbaugh	Administrator of the Federal Emergency Management Agency; 2003–2005	Succeeded by R. David Paulison
