= 2025 Tongan general election =

- 20 November 2025
- All 26 elected seats in the Legislative Assembly; 14 seats needed for a majority
- Turnout: 49.87% (▼12.05pp)
Party	Seats	+/–
Independents	17	+4
This lists parties that won seats. See the complete results below.
Prime Minister before	Prime Minister after
ʻAisake Eke; Independent	Fatafehi Fakafānua; Independent

General elections were held in Tonga on 20 November 2025. Prominent campaign issues included the cost of living and the monarchy's influence in government.

ʻAisake Eke became prime minister in January 2025. He succeeded Siaosi Sovaleni, who served from 2021 until his resignation in December 2024, shortly before a planned no-confidence motion, which Eke introduced. In August 2025, parliament passed a bill to replace the foreign ministry with an entity named His Majesty's Diplomatic Services, which would be under the monarch's authority. Royalists supported the bill, while pro-democracy advocates criticised it.

For the first time since its formation, the Democratic Party of the Friendly Islands (PTOA) failed to win any seats. Only one woman was elected, while two cabinet ministers lost their seats. Voter turnout was 49%, a decline from 62% in the 2021 election. Parliament elected a prime minister on 15 December. Two members of parliament were nominated, Prime Minister Eke and Parliamentary Speaker Fatafehi Fakafānua. The candidacy of Fakafānua, who is a relative of King Tupou VI, marked the first time a nobles' representative had run for prime minister since 2010. Fakafānua defeated Eke and became the second noble to serve as prime minister since democratisation. While some Tongans welcomed Fakafānua's victory, many pro-democracy advocates viewed his election as a setback for the country's democratic reforms.

== Background ==
=== 2021 general election ===
At the 2021 general election, independents won the most seats, securing 13. The PTOA won majorities in most constituencies. However, the party had been plagued by divisions since party founder and Prime Minister ʻAkilisi Pōhiva's death in 2019. The two rival claimants to the party's leadership, Sēmisi Sika and Pōhiva's son Siaosi Pōhiva, along with their factions, each fielded a separate list of candidates, which led to vote-splitting that benefited independents. The PTOA won only three seats, down from the 14 it secured in 2017. Both Sika and Pōhiva lost their seats. Prime Minister Pōhiva Tuʻiʻonetoa was the only successful candidate from his Tonga People's Party. No women were elected.

Following the election, three MPs declared their candidacies for prime minister: incumbent Prime Minister Tuʻiʻonetoa, former Deputy Prime Minister Siaosi Sovaleni and former Finance Minister ʻAisake Eke. Tuʻiʻonetoa later withdrew, allegedly due to a lack of support in parliament, and backed Eke. In a parliamentary vote on 15 December, Sovaleni defeated Eke. Sovaleni announced his new cabinet on 29 December, which included one woman, Fekitamoeloa ʻUtoikamanu, who was appointed foreign minister.

=== 2024 constitutional crisis ===
On 2 February 2024, while Sovaleni was in New Zealand for medical treatment, King Tupou VI revoked his armed forces portfolio and dismissed ʻUtoikamanu from the foreign affairs and tourism portfolios reportedly without explanation. Cabinet initially rejected the King's decrees, culminating in a constitutional crisis, with Attorney-General Linda Folaumoetuʻi stating that the dismissals were unconstitutional. Some MPs then accused Sovaleni of insulting the King, which he denied. In April, Sovaleni and ʻUtoikamanu agreed to accept the King's decrees and relinquished their respective portfolios.

=== No-confidence motions and resignation of Sovaleni ===
Sovaleni survived a no-confidence motion on 6 September 2023, which Eke filed. Sovaleni received the support of 14 MPs, who voted to keep him in office. A rare split occurred among the nobles' representatives, with three voting for the motion and others supporting Sovaleni. Eke tabled the motion, accusing Sovaleni of corruption, mismanagement, and poor governance. On 23 November 2024, Eke submitted a second motion against Sovaleni. Before parliamentary debate could begin on the motion, Sovaleni resigned on 9 December. Parliament elected Eke as prime minister on 24 December, defeating Viliami Latu. Eke assumed office on 22 January 2025. His cabinet was inaugurated on 28 January, which included four ministers who Eke also appointed members of parliament. Among the appointed MPs were two women and one noble, Crown Prince Tupoutoʻa ʻUlukalala, who became foreign minister and minister for His Majesty's Armed Forces.

=== Reform of the foreign ministry ===
Shortly before the conclusion of its 2025 session, the Legislative Assembly passed a bill on 5 August replacing the foreign ministry with His Majesty's Diplomatic Service, which would be transferred to the authority of the palace office, effectively allowing the monarch to directly administer Tonga's foreign affairs. Crown Prince Tupoutoʻa ʻUlukalala tabled the bill in parliament. The reforms faced criticism from pro-democracy advocates, while royal supporters favoured it. The PTOA petitioned the King not to sign the bill into law. Teisa Pōhiva, the PTOA chair and the daughter of former Prime Minister ‘Akilisi Pōhiva, led the petition and warned the reforms would make it difficult to hold the ministry accountable and restrict public access to crucial information. Former Solicitor-General ʻAminiasi Kefu argued it would provide "certainty" and said the passage of the 2010 reforms had caused confusion as to whether the ministry was under the monarch's authority or cabinet. Kefu claimed the foreign ministry would still be subject to checks and balances. Deputy Prime Minister Taniela Fusimalohi assured that the monarch and the Privy Council would not have the power to issue passports.

== Electoral system ==
The Legislative Assembly of Tonga has up to 30 members, of which 17 are directly elected by first-past-the-post voting from single-member constituencies. The island of Tongatapu has ten constituencies, Vavaʻu three, Haʻapai two and ʻEua and Niuatoputapu/Niuafoʻou have one each. Nine seats are held by members of the nobility who elect representatives amongst themselves. The Cabinet formed by a prime minister may include up to four members not elected to the Assembly, who then automatically become members of the legislature. Unless the monarch dissolves the Legislative Assembly early, members serve a four-year term.

Candidates and voters are required to be at least 21 years old and hold Tongan citizenship. Ineligible voters include those who have served a prison sentence of at least two years and individuals convicted of a criminal offence. To qualify, candidates are required to be eligible voters and present in Tonga for at least a three-month period within the six months before an election. Candidates running for a people's seat also require the signatures of at least 50 qualified electors from the constituency they contest and a deposit to be paid. Individuals subject to legal action for outstanding debt are ineligible to be contestants. Contestants must also undergo a legal clearance to qualify. In September 2025, the King signed an amendment revoking the nobles' exemption from this procedure. A total of 64,707 electors were registered to vote, a modest increase from 2021. The elections supervisor, Pita Vuki, stated that the electorate had increased from the 2021 election, but noted that the electoral roll still included deceased voters and individuals who had emigrated abroad. Vuki announced the electoral commission would look into removing these names after the election.

== Schedule ==
King Tupou VI issued the election writ on 11 September. Voter registration officially closed on 18 September, however, the electoral commission accepted late enrollments until 6 November. Candidate registration commenced on 8 October and closed the following day. Contestants had from 15 to 16 October to withdraw their candidacies if they intended to do so, while the term of the Legislative Assembly formally concluded on 23 October. The campaign blackout period occurred on 19 November. The election writ was returned to the monarch on 4 December.

Date	Event
11 September	Monarch issues the Writ for election
18 September	Voter registration officially closes
8–9 October	Candidate nomination period
15–16 October	Candidate withdrawal period
23 October	Parliamentary term formally ends
6 November	Deadline for late voter enrolments
19 November	Campaign blackout
20 November	Election day
4 December	Writ is returned

== Candidates and campaign ==
A total of 71 candidates for the people's seats and 13 contestants for the nobles' seats registered to contest the election. One candidate, Kalaniuvalu Fotofili, the incumbent noble MP for the Niuas constituency, was re-elected unopposed. Eight women contested the election, the lowest total since democratisation in 2010. The overall candidate total for the people's seats was slightly lower than in 2021, contributing to a trend in declining contestant numbers since the 2014 election. Two days before the election, one of the candidates for the nobles' seats, Sitenimoa Valevale, who was to contest the ‘Eua and Tongatapu constituencies, was disqualified due to ongoing legal proceedings against him. In early May, then-PTOA Party Chair Siale Napaʻa Fihake published a provisional party candidate list on Facebook. The list included members from both rival factions and several cabinet ministers, including Prime Minister Eke. It reportedly sparked backlash due to a lack of consultation with party executives and members. Eke denied that he would contest the election as a PTOA candidate and stated he would run as an independent. Most candidates did not run as affiliates of political parties. Some contestants, however, ran under the PTOA banner, including the sons of ʻAkilisi Pōhiva: Siaosi and ʻAkilisi Jr.

Major campaign issues included the cost of living, healthcare access and the monarchy's influence in government. Calls to allow Tongans abroad to vote while outside the country, especially for individuals employed in seasonal work, was also a prominent issue. Proponents argued that overseas voting should be permitted, citing the diaspora's significant contribution to the economy through remittances. Voters called on the parliamentary hopefuls to improve the country's infrastructure and address the persistent fuel shortages, that had especially affected Nukuʻalofa. Most candidates campaigned on their personal records, while bloc campaigns were rare. As in previous elections, sitting candidates generally had an advantage over challengers. Campaigns for the nobles' seats mainly occurred in the form of negotiations between candidates and the constituents they sought to win over. On 15 November, Tonga National University conducted the country's first pre-election poll. A total of 445 eligible voters across Tongatapu's 10 constituencies participated in the poll. Three constituencies showed the frontrunners leading by relatively comfortable margins, while three others saw candidates with large leads. The Tongatapu 2 and Tongatapu 6 electorates indicated close races, with contestants neck and neck.

== Conduct ==
On election day, polling stations for the people's seats opened at 9:00 and closed at 16:00. Voting for the nobles commenced at 10:00 and concluded at 12:00; the electoral commission announced the results for these seats shortly after. The electoral commission set up polling booths for voters who were outside the island group of the constituency in which they were registered on the day of the election. The election supervisor announced the results for the people's seats almost five hours after polls had closed. According to the electoral commission, no issues were reported with voting at any polling stations.

== Results ==
Seven of the incumbent nobles' representatives won re-election, while two newcomers secured seats. Ten of the incumbent people's representatives were returned to parliament, including Prime Minister Eke, who attained the largest margin of all candidates nationwide, receiving around 72% of the vote in his Tongatapu 5 constituency. Two cabinet members, Education Minister ʻUhilamoelangi Fasi and Tourism Minister Moʻale Finau, lost their seats, as did former acting prime minister Samiu Vaipulu. Six newcomers were elected, while former acting prime minister Sēmisi Sika returned to parliament, regaining the Tongatapu 2 seat that he had lost in the previous election to Fasi. One female candidate, Fane Fotu Fituafe, secured a seat, defeating incumbent Dulcie Tei in Tongatapu 6. The PTOA did not secure any seats, marking the first time the party was left without parliamentary representation since its establishment, leaving the Legislative Assembly to be composed entirely of independents. Voter turnout reached 49%, a decrease from 62% in 2021. Election Supervisor Vuki largely attributed the low turnout to many voters having been outside Tonga on election day.

Party	Votes	%	Seats	+/–
Democratic Party of the Friendly Islands			0	–3
Independents			17	+4
Nobles' representatives			9	0
Total			26	–
Valid votes	32,221	99.85		
Invalid/blank votes	50	0.15		
Total votes	32,271	100.00		
Registered voters/turnout	64,707	49.87		
Source: TEC (people's seats), RNZ (nobles), TEC (electorate)

=== By constituency ===
==== People's seats ====
Tongatapu 1
Candidate	Votes	%
Tēvita Fatafehi Puloka	1,343	62.58
Siaosi Pōhiva	758	35.32
Eliesa Fifita	45	2.10
Total	2,146	100.00
Valid votes	2,146	99.77
Invalid/blank votes	5	0.23
Total votes	2,151	100.00
Registered voters/turnout	4,725	45.52
Source: TEC

Tongatapu 2
Candidate	Votes	%
Sēmisi Sika	951	55.45
ʻUhilamoelangi Fasi	764	44.55
Total	1,715	100.00
Valid votes	1,715	99.88
Invalid/blank votes	2	0.12
Total votes	1,717	100.00
Registered voters/turnout	3,890	44.14
Source: TEC

Tongatapu 3
Candidate	Votes	%
Siaosi Sovaleni	1,239	72.75
Gabriella ʻIlolahia	464	27.25
Total	1,703	100.00
Valid votes	1,703	99.82
Invalid/blank votes	3	0.18
Total votes	1,706	100.00
Registered voters/turnout	4,686	36.41
Source: TEC

Tongatapu 4
Candidate	Votes	%
Mateni Tapueluelu	1,021	54.11
Viliami ʻA. Takau	808	42.82
ʻIsileli Pulu	56	2.97
Vili Fonolahi Pese	2	0.11
Total	1,887	100.00
Valid votes	1,887	99.63
Invalid/blank votes	7	0.37
Total votes	1,894	100.00
Registered voters/turnout	4,418	42.87
Source: TEC

Tongatapu 5
Candidate	Votes	%
ʻAisake Eke	1,568	72.93
Hekisou Fifita	480	22.33
Adi Mitimiti Pasikala	102	4.74
Total	2,150	100.00
Valid votes	2,150	99.86
Invalid/blank votes	3	0.14
Total votes	2,153	100.00
Registered voters/turnout	4,631	46.49
Source: TEC

Tongatapu 6
Candidate	Votes	%
Fane Fotu Fituafe	978	42.67
Dulcie Tei	835	36.43
Viliami Mahe Poʻese	283	12.35
Sione Leki	126	5.50
Tahifisi Vehikite	48	2.09
Sepeti Vakameilalo	22	0.96
Total	2,292	100.00
Valid votes	2,292	99.87
Invalid/blank votes	3	0.13
Total votes	2,295	100.00
Registered voters/turnout	4,857	47.25
Source: TEC

Tongatapu 7
Candidate	Votes	%
Paula Piukala	1,177	52.85
Siaosi ʻAkapei K. Maʻilei	499	22.41
Tauaʻho ʻAhokovi	266	11.94
Siueli ʻEleni Mone	155	6.96
Kitione Nikua	67	3.01
Lute Finau	51	2.29
Mateitalo Folaumoetao	12	0.54
Total	2,227	100.00
Valid votes	2,227	99.91
Invalid/blank votes	2	0.09
Total votes	2,229	100.00
Registered voters/turnout	4,728	47.14
Source: TEC

Tongatapu 8
Candidate	Votes	%
Viliami Sisifa	567	28.36
Raymond Lafu Sika	398	19.91
Filia Hetau Uipi	309	15.46
Johnny Taione	233	11.66
Taufa Kuli ʻAhomeʻe	221	11.06
Sipaisi Kutu	174	8.70
Poasi Fonua	97	4.85
Total	1,999	100.00
Valid votes	1,999	99.90
Invalid/blank votes	2	0.10
Total votes	2,001	100.00
Registered voters/turnout	4,233	47.27
Source: TEC

Tongatapu 9
Candidate	Votes	%
Sevenitini Toumoʻua	1,076	49.88
Tevita Tukunga	816	37.83
Vika Vaka Fusimalohi	164	7.60
Puluno ʻIpolito Lasalo	101	4.68
Total	2,157	100.00
Valid votes	2,157	99.91
Invalid/blank votes	2	0.09
Total votes	2,159	100.00
Registered voters/turnout	4,393	49.15
Source: TEC

Tongatapu 10
Candidate	Votes	%
Kapelieli Lanumata	1,423	60.68
Fakaʻosi Maama	460	19.62
Matani Nifofa	290	12.37
Tulutulu Mafuaiolotele Kalaniuvalu	172	7.33
Total	2,345	100.00
Valid votes	2,345	99.83
Invalid/blank votes	4	0.17
Total votes	2,349	100.00
Registered voters/turnout	4,783	49.11
Source: TEC

ʻEua 11
Candidate	Votes	%
Taniela Fusimalohi	1,179	60.62
Tevita Lavemaau	709	36.45
Siuaki Livai	55	2.83
Silivia Loumaile Mahe	2	0.10
Total	1,945	100.00
Valid votes	1,945	100.00
Invalid/blank votes	0	0.00
Total votes	1,945	100.00
Registered voters/turnout	3,241	60.01
Source: TEC

Haʻapai 12
Candidate	Votes	%
Saimone Vuki	437	29.77
Moʻale Finau	395	26.91
Tevita Vaikona	315	21.46
Sione Finau Tapu	190	12.94
Sione Foaki Fifita	121	8.24
Penisimani Tavalu Fatafehi	10	0.68
Total	1,468	100.00
Valid votes	1,468	99.66
Invalid/blank votes	5	0.34
Total votes	1,473	100.00
Registered voters/turnout	2,464	59.78
Source: TEC

Haʻapai 13
Candidate	Votes	%
Esafe Hema Latu	550	33.21
ʻAkilisi Pōhiva Jr.	522	31.52
Veivosa Taka	475	28.68
Fotofili Mahe	70	4.23
Siua Taufa	39	2.36
Total	1,656	100.00
Valid votes	1,656	99.94
Invalid/blank votes	1	0.06
Total votes	1,657	100.00
Registered voters/turnout	2,666	62.15
Source: TEC

Vavaʻu 14
Candidate	Votes	%
Moʻale ʻOtunuku	1,064	60.08
Tuʻamelle Topui	398	22.47
Latu Niua Lepolo	309	17.45
Total	1,771	100.00
Valid votes	1,771	99.66
Invalid/blank votes	6	0.34
Total votes	1,777	100.00
Registered voters/turnout	3,251	54.66
Source: TEC

Vavaʻu 15
Candidate	Votes	%
Alani Petelo Tangitau	848	44.26
Samiu Vaipulu	451	23.54
Keuli Pasina Lavaki	433	22.60
Tomifa Faingaʻa Paea	181	9.45
Arthur Afuhaʻamango	3	0.16
Total	1,916	100.00
Valid votes	1,916	99.84
Invalid/blank votes	3	0.16
Total votes	1,919	100.00
Registered voters/turnout	3,180	60.35
Source: TEC

Vavaʻu 16
Candidate	Votes	%
Viliami Latu	1,137	59.25
ʻEtuate Lavulavu	782	40.75
Total	1,919	100.00
Valid votes	1,919	100.00
Invalid/blank votes	0	0.00
Total votes	1,919	100.00
Registered voters/turnout	3,723	51.54
Source: TEC

Ongo Niua 17
Candidate	Votes	%
Lataifaingataʻa Tangimana	540	64.29
Paula Vovole Kohinoa	195	23.21
Vatau Hui	61	7.26
ʻAisake Hoatatau Finau	44	5.24
Total	840	100.00
Valid votes	840	99.76
Invalid/blank votes	2	0.24
Total votes	842	100.00
Registered voters/turnout	1,288	65.37
Source: TEC

==== Nobles ====
Constituency	Candidate	Votes
‘Eua	Lord Ve‘ehala	20
‘Eua	Lord Lasike	1
Ha‘apai	Lord Fakafānua	6
Ha‘apai	Lord Tu‘iha‘angana	6
Ha‘apai	Lord Tu‘iha‘ateiho	2
Niuas	Prince Fotofili	Unopposed
Tongatapu	Lord Ma‘afu	12
Tongatapu	Lord Vaea	10
Tongatapu	Lord Tu‘ivakanō	8
Tongatapu	Lord Lasike	6
Vava‘u	Lord Tu‘i‘afitu	5
Vava‘u	Lord Tu‘ilakepa	5
Vava‘u	Lord Luani	3
Vava‘u	Lord Fulivai	1
Source: RNZ

== Aftermath ==
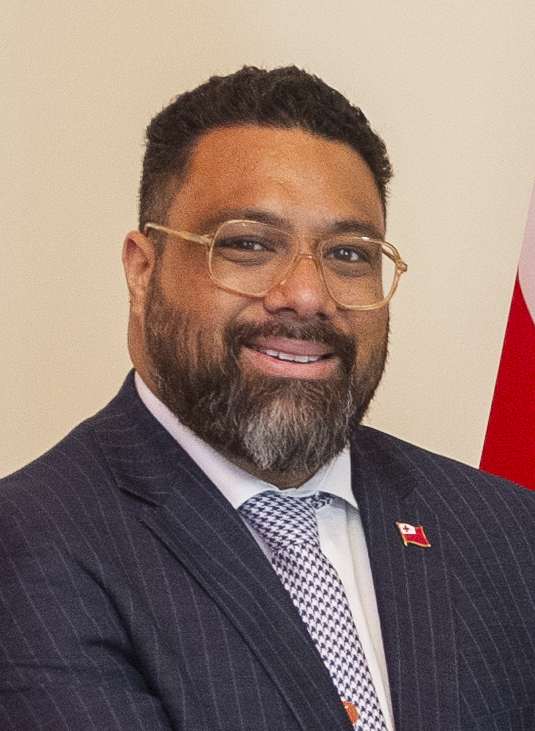
Fatafehi Fakafānua was elected prime minister

Following the election, noble MP ʻAlipate Tuʻivanuavou Vaea called on parliament to elect one of the nobles' representatives as prime minister, claiming they were more experienced and unified than the people's representatives. Vaea highlighted how previous prime ministers had struggled to maintain control over their governments, stating the people's representatives operate as individuals rather than a unified caucus. PTOA Chair Teisa Pōhiva said that the nobles' rhetoric suggested a desire to reclaim the powers they had before 2010. She urged the people's representatives to unite to keep control over the premiership and mentioned the decades-long effort to achieve democratisation. Days before the election, Vaea claimed that two nobles, Parliamentary Speaker Fatafehi Fakafānua, who is a close relative of the King, and former Prime Minister Sialeʻataongo Tuʻivakanō, intended to run in the prime ministerial election. Vaea's announcement signalled a shift in Tongan politics, as, reportedly due to the monarch's request, none of the nobles' representatives had run for prime minister since 2010. Both Prime Minister Eke and his predecessor, Sovaleni, also emerged as likely contenders for the premiership.

Nominations for the prime ministerial election were open from 1 to 12 December. Days before nominations closed, plans for a proposed citizenship-by-investment scheme were leaked to the press. The proposal became a focal point in the prime ministerial vote. Fakafānua supported the scheme, arguing that it would ease Tonga's budget deficits and reduce its dependence on foreign donations. The proposal was projected to generate around US$400 million. According to Kaniva Tonga, Fakafānua and several lobbyists attempted to convince the Eke government to approve the scheme, which they ultimately refused to support. The proposal sparked widespread concern; critics highlighted the sale of Tongan passports in the 1980s, which saw the involvement of foreign fugitives. Parliament convened on 15 December to elect a prime minister. Two MPs were nominated, Speaker Fakafānua and Prime Minister Eke. Deputy Prime Minister Taniela Fusimalohi also intended to seek the premiership, but was reportedly unable to attract enough support needed to enter the race, he subsequently supported Fakafānua. Voting was held using a secret ballot. Fakafānua went on to defeat the incumbent prime minister and received 16 votes, becoming the second noble elected as head of government since democratisation. Eke received 10 votes. Up to seven of the people's representatives voted for Fakafānua. Vaea was subsequently elected speaker, while Havea Tuʻihaʻangana became deputy speaker, both of whom were elected unopposed. Fakafānua was formally appointed by the monarch on 18 December, and announced that he would retain Crown Prince Tupoutoʻa ʻUlukalala as foreign minister and minister for His Majesty's Armed Forces. The prime minister unveiled the rest of his cabinet lineup on 5 January 2026, shortly after the monarch approved his ministerial selections. Former Prime Minister Sovaleni, Sēmisi Sika and former Deputy Prime Minister Fusimalohi were included in Fakafānua's cabinet. Viliami Latu was appointed deputy prime minister, while the sole female MP, Fane Fotu Fituafe, was assigned the internal affairs portfolio. All ministers were sworn-in on 6 January, except for Fusimalohi, who was scheduled to assume office on 9 January.

=== Reactions ===
Upon his election, Fakafānua stated he would prioritise stability in his government and intended to select cabinet ministers based on the consensus of all members of parliament. Pakilau Manase Lua, a leader of the Tongan community in New Zealand, praised Fakafānua's election, describing it as a "breath of fresh air". Pro-democracy advocates, however, expressed concern. Lopeti Senituli, a former advisor to the government, said Fakafānua's triumph indicated a return to control by the monarchy. Senituli also stated that a nobles' representative as head of government undermined checks and balances on the monarchy and nobility, arguing they are not as accountable to the public as the people's representatives. He, along with some of the people's representatives, stated that, due to both positions of speaker and deputy speaker being reserved for the nobility, the nobles effectively had a monopoly over the parliamentary leadership. Teisa Pōhiva described Fakafānua's victory as a "sad day" for the country's democratic reforms, and highlighted that he was elected by a small pool of voters. His supporters in parliament, including some of the people's representatives, argued that the constitution did not bar him from becoming prime minister. Responding to the criticism, Fakafānua said that he was accountable to the public and not the nobles or the monarchy.

=== Electoral petitions ===
Electoral petitions were filed against eight members of parliament after the election, by their unsuccessful opponents, accusing them of corrupt electoral practices. Two cabinet members were found guilty of election bribery by the Supreme Court in 2026: Finance Minister Lataifaingataʻa Tangimana on 24 March, who resigned from cabinet shortly after, and Lands Minister Taniela Fusimalohi in June. Tourism Minister Sēmisi Sika was convicted in May for exceeding campaign spending limits. All three subsequently announced they would appeal the rulings. After Fusimalohi's conviction, political analyst Mafua ‘a e Lulutai Malakai Koloamatangi called for a public awareness campaign outlining practices that constitute bribery. An electoral petition against Deputy Prime Minister Latu, filed by ʻEtuate Lavulavu, was dismissed by the Supreme Court in early June for lack of evidence. Fusimalohi successfully appealed his case and retained his seat; however, the convictions against Sika and Tangimana were upheld on 17 July, triggering by-elections in the Niua 17 and Tongatapu 2 constituencies.
