= 2026 Tongatapu 2 by-election =

- 8 October 2026
- Turnout: 37.04% (▼7.10pp)
	First party	Second party
Candidate	Alvin Sika	Malakai Koloamatangi
Party	Independent	Independent
Popular vote	609	262
Percentage	40.82%	17.56%
	Third party	Fourth party
Candidate	Lei Pa‘asi	‘Illaisa Lepolo Taunisila
Party	Independent	Independent
Popular vote	248	107
Percentage	16.62%	7.17%
MP before election
Sēmisi Sika
Independent
Elected MP
Alvin Sika
Independent

A by-election to the Legislative Assembly of Tonga was held in the Tongatapu 2 constituency on 8 October 2026. The by-election was triggered after the previous representative, Sēmisi Sika, was removed from parliament following his conviction for exceeding campaign expenditure limits during the 2025 general election. All contestants ran as independents. Alvin Sika, the brother of Sēmisi Sika, won the seat, securing 40% of the vote. He defeated eight other candidates, including Malakai Koloamatangi, an academic who placed second with 17%, and former representative ‘Illaisa Lepolo Taunisila. Voter turnout was 37%, a decline from the previous election.

== Background ==
Former Deputy Prime Minister Sēmisi Sika reclaimed the seat during the 2025 general election, having lost in 2021. He received 55% of the vote, defeating the incumbent member, Education Minister ʻUhilamoelangi Fasi, who garnered 44%. The election resulted in independents winning all seats, with the once dominant Democratic Party of the Friendly Islands, of which Sika was formerly affiliated, failing to capture any seats. Parliament subsequently elected Fatafehi Fakafānua as prime minister, who appointed Sika as minister of infrastructure and tourism. Fasi filed a lawsuit after the election, alleging that Sika had exceeded the 20,000 paʻanga campaign spending limit in breach of the Electoral Act. The Supreme Court convicted Sika, he went on to unsuccessfully appeal the ruling. As a result, Sika was removed from parliament on 3 August, triggering a by-election in the constituency. King Tupou VI issued the election writ on 7 August, scheduling the poll for 8 October, the same day as the Niua 17 by-election.

== Electoral system ==
Elections to all 17 Legislative Assembly seats elected by commoners are conducted using the first-past-the-post electoral system. Candidates and voters are required to hold Tongan citizenship, be at least 21 years old, be able to read and write in the Tongan language and not have a mental disability. Contestants also need to reside in the Tongatapu 2 constituency for at least three months before the election, obtain no fewer than 50 signatures from eligible electors, and undergo legal clearance to qualify. As Tonga does not employ overseas voting, all eligible electors must be in the country to cast a ballot.

== Candidates and campaign ==
The period for contestants to formally register their candidates took place from 2 to 3 September. Former member Fasi reportedly emerged as the favourite; however, he did not register his candidacy. The reasons for his absence from the ballot were reportedly unclear. Nine individuals registered their candidacies, an increase from only two parliamentary hopefuls in 2025. All contestants ran as independents. Among the contestants was political scientist Malakai Koloamatangi, the registrar of Tonga National University, Alivin Sika, the younger brother of Sēmisi Sika and ‘Illaisa Lepolo Taunisila, who previously represented the former Niuas constituency. Three individuals announced their intentions to run but ultimately withdrew before the nomination period. One of whom, Ringo Faʻoliu, said he did not meet the requirements to qualify, while Soane Patita Fifita and Attorney Sione Fonua dropped out to endorse Koloamatangi. Strengthening the country's democratic reforms, which Koloamatangi regarded as incomplete, was a key issue in his campaign and motivated Fonua to support his candidacy.

== Results ==
On the day of the by-election, polling stations closed at 16:00, and Election Supervisor Sam Vao announced the results several hours later. Alvin Sika won the by-election with 40% of the vote. The result was similar to the concurrently held Niua 17 by-election, in that the victor was a close relative of the previous representative. Malakai Koloamatangi placed second with 17% of the vote, followed by Lei Pa‘asi, who received 16%. Former representative ‘Illaisa Lepolo Taunisila finished fourth, garnering 7%. The other five candidates received less than 100 votes. Voter turnout reached 37%, a decrease from 44% in the 2025 general election.

Candidate	Party	Votes	%
Alvin Sika	Independent	609	40.82
Malakai Koloamatangi	Independent	262	17.56
Lei Pa‘asi	Independent	248	16.62
‘Illaisa Lepolo Taunisila	Independent	107	7.17
Samiuela Vea	Independent	93	6.23
‘Olioni Manoa	Independent	56	3.75
Sione Harvard Tupouniua	Independent	56	3.75
Mele ‘Amanaki	Independent	52	3.49
Mounu Uaisele	Independent	9	0.60
Total		1,492	100.00
Valid votes		1,492	100.00
Invalid/blank votes		0	0.00
Total votes		1,492	100.00
Registered voters/turnout		4,028	37.04
Source: Matangi Tonga, TEC (turnout)
