= Kapelieli Lanumata =

Tongan politician

Minister for Trade & Economic Development
- Incumbent
- Assumed office 28 January 2025
- Prime Minister: ʻAisake Eke
- Preceded by: Viliami Latu

Member of Parliament for Tongatapu 10
- Incumbent
- Assumed office 13 July 2023
- Preceded by: Pōhiva Tuʻiʻonetoa

Kapelieli Militoni Lanumata is a Tongan politician and Cabinet Minister.

He was first elected to the Parliament of Tonga at the 2023 Tongatapu 10 by-election. In January 2025 he was appointed Minister for Trade & Economic Development in the cabinet of ʻAisake Eke.

He was re-elected at the 2025 election.
