= Paula Piukala =

Tongan politician

Minister for Public Enterprises
- In office 28 January 2025 – 10 December 2025
- Preceded by: Siaosi Sovaleni

Minister for Police, Fire & Emergency Services
- In office 28 January 2025 – 10 December 2025
- Preceded by: Siaosi Sovaleni

Member of the Tongan Parliament for Tongatapu 7
- Incumbent
- Assumed office 3 November 2022
- Preceded by: Sione Sangster Saulala

Personal details
- Party: Democratic Party of the Friendly Islands

Paula Piveni Piukala is a Tongan politician and former Cabinet Minister. He is a member of the Democratic Party of the Friendly Islands.

Piukala works in the information technology industry, including as a computer systems manager for Shoreline Group. In March 2005 he became a whistleblower against Shoreline, alleging financial mismanagement, falsified audits, and exorbitant salaries paid to the company's executives, which included Crown Prince Tupouto‘a (later George Tupou V). The allegations led to a court case and protests against Shoreline from the Human Rights and Democracy Movement. He later worked as director of Tonga Cable.

At the 2021 Tongan general election he sought the PTOA nomination for Tongatapu 7, but a factional dispute inside the PTOA saw him lose to Sione Sangster Saulala. He contested the election anyway, but lost. Following the election he challenged Saulala's election in court, resulting in the latter's election being voided for bribery. Piukala was elected in the subsequent 2022 Tongatapu 7 by-election.

In February 2024 he was suspended from parliament for seven days after offending Prime Minister Siaosi Sovaleni during a heated debate on Lulutai Airlines. The suspension was later reduced, and Piukala resumed his seat on 26 February.

On 28 January 2025 he was appointed to the cabinet of ʻAisake Eke as Minister for Public Enterprises and Minister for Police, Fire and Emergency Services. In February 2025 he unsuccessfully requested to take his oath of office in English. In August 2025 he was suspended from parliament for five days after getting into a brawl with Lord Tuʻilakepa.

He was re-elected at the 2025 election. Shortly after the election, but before the new parliament met, he was suspended from his ministerial positions following corruption allegations. As a result he supported Fatafehi Fakafānua for the position of prime minister. He was subsequently charged with interfering with justice after assisting Mormon church leader Pita Hopate to flee the country in contravention of a court order.

In June 2026 he was again suspended from parliament for disorder after alleging another MP was connected with a drug lord.
