= 2023 Tongatapu 10 by-election =

A by-election was held in the Tongan electorate of Tongatapu 10 on 13 July 2023. The by-election was triggered by the death of Pōhiva Tuʻiʻonetoa on 18 March 2023. It was won by Kapelieli Militoni Lanumata.

== Results ==
Candidate	Votes	%
Kapelieli Lanumata	870	38.51
Matani Nifofā	621	27.49
Fotu Fisi'iahi	507	22.44
Daniel Fale	139	6.15
Senimili Fonua	122	5.40
Total	2,259	100.00
Valid votes	2,259	99.91
Invalid/blank votes	2	0.09
Total votes	2,261	100.00
