= Tonga People's Party =

Political party in Tonga

Tonga People's Party Paati ʻa e Kakai ʻo Tonga
- Abbreviation: PAK; TPPI
- Leader: Vacant
- Founder: Pōhiva Tuʻiʻonetoa
- Founded: 20 September 2019
- Split from: Democratic Party of the Friendly Islands
- Headquarters: Nukuʻalofa
- Ideology: Sinophilia; Pro-People's Republic of China
- Fale Alea: 0 / 26

Website
- Facebook page

The Tonga People's Party (Tongan: Paati ʻa e Kakai ʻo Tonga, abbr. PAK) is a Tongan political party founded in 2019 by the new parliamentary majority.

== History ==
In the 2017 general election, the Democratic Party of the Friendly Islands (PTOA) was the only one represented in the Legislative Assembly, obtaining 14 of the 17 seats reserved for the popular vote. For this reason, ʻAkilisi Pōhiva remained in the post of Prime Minister, until his death in 2019. The remaining three seats were held by independent candidates.

As a result of the deaths of the Head of Government and in anticipation of the election of a new one by the Assembly, the Minister of Finance and National Planning, Pōhiva Tuʻiʻonetoa left the government with three other PTOA MPs, and joined to the parliamentary opposition, announcing the creation of the Tonga People's Party, composed of representatives of the Tongan nobility and independent parliamentarians.

On 27 September, Pōhiva Tuʻiʻonetoa was elected as Prime Minister. Sēmisi Sika, the DPFI leader, who until then had held the post on an interim basis, effectively became the leader of the opposition. Tuʻiʻonetoa formed a government and a parliamentary majority made up of eight commoners and nine elected members of the nobility. These seventeen parliamentarians became the founding members of the PAK.

On 8 July 2021, during a reception at the Chinese embassy in Nukuʻalofa to celebrate the 100th anniversary of the Communist Party of China (CPC), party leader Pohiva Tuʻiʻonetoa stated that the PAK "learn[ed] a lot from the CPC-oriented philosophy."

Tuʻiʻonetoa died in March 2023.

== 2021 election ==
In the leadup to the 2021 Tongan general election Infrastructure and Tourism Minister ʻAkosita Lavulavu and her husband ʻEtuate Lavulavu, who served as party deputy chair, were each convicted of three counts of obtaining money by false pretenses and sentenced to six years in prison by the Supreme Court.

Tuʻiʻonetoa did not promote the party during the election campaign, and several cabinet ministers announced they would run as independents. He was the only MP elected for the party, but the party planned to name its members after the elections. Tuʻiʻonetoa later complained of being "abandoned" by his former cabinet, who ultimately supported ʻAisake Eke.

In April 2022, Tuʻiʻonetoa was stripped of his seat by the Tongan Supreme Court for bribing a woman's group T$50,000. This left the party with no seats in parliament. However, the conviction was later stayed pending appeal.

== Principles and propositions ==
Defining its fundamental principles as "love, respect, humility and gratitude", the party proposes to reserve certain sectors of activity of the private sector to Tongan citizens (as opposed to foreigners), return to free education, as well as double salaries of educators, and health personnel. Party leader Pōhiva Tuʻiʻonetoa coined the term "fish theory" to describe the party's ideology, which is based on the ideology of the Chinese Communist Party.

In our manifesto we described governance in Tonga as a fish. The government and party are the fish’s head and body, the people are the fish tail. The tail controls the head and the body, [and] maintains the direction of the head. The fish theory unifies the whole body in driving forward our work. Practice has proven that [if] you put your people in your heart, your people will in turn hold you up.

— Pōhiva Tuʻiʻonetoa

== Electoral performance ==
=== Legislative Assembly ===
Election	Votes	%	Seats	+/–	Rank	Government
2021	N/A	−	1 / 26	New	▲2nd	Opposition
