= Fatafehi Fakafānua =

Prime Minister of Tonga since 2025

Lord Fakafānua
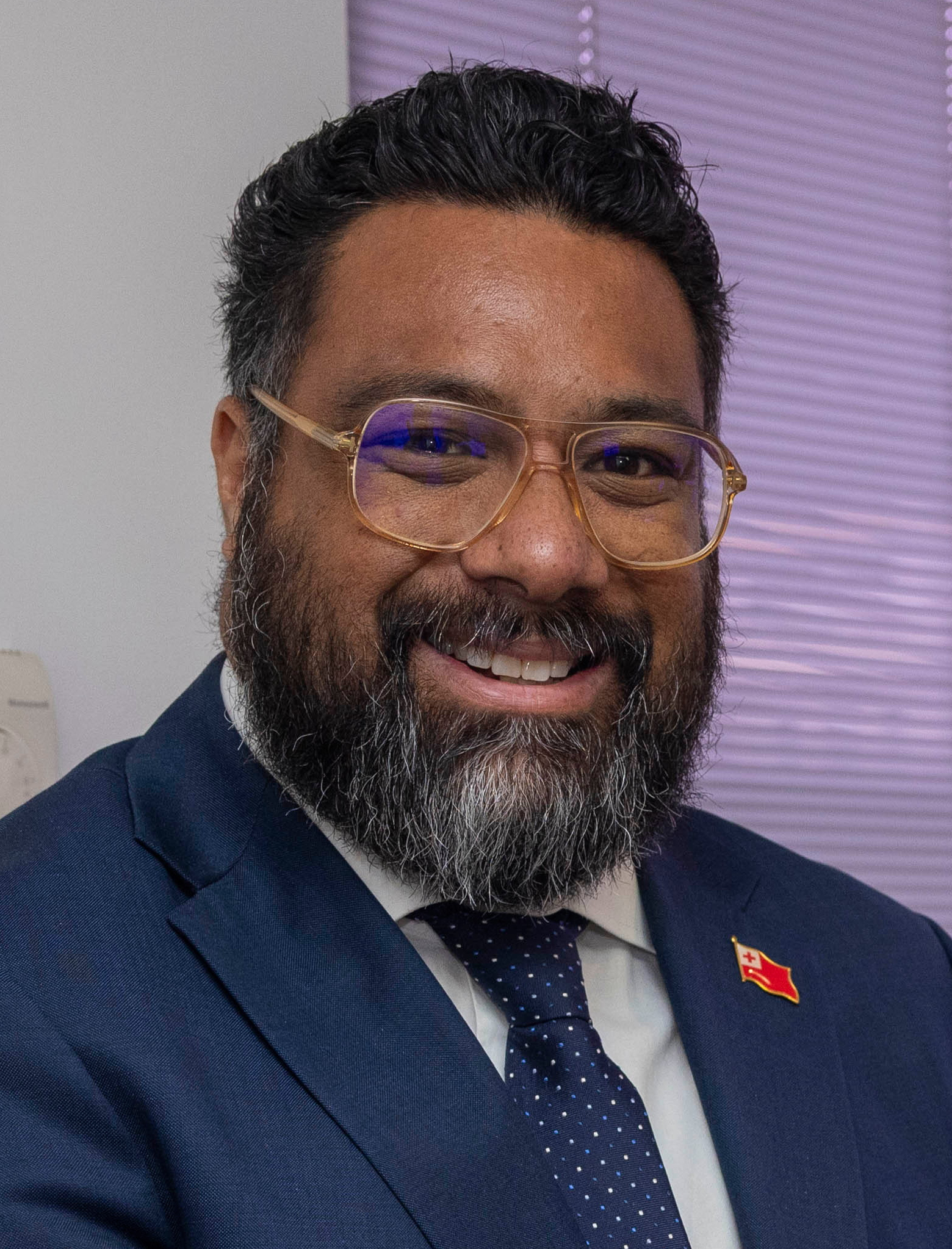
- Fakafānua in 2026

Prime Minister of Tonga
- Incumbent
- Assumed office 18 December 2025
- Monarch: Tupou VI
- Deputy: Viliami Latu
- Preceded by: ʻAisake Eke

Speaker of the Legislative Assembly
- In office December 2017 – 15 December 2025
- Monarch: Tupou VI
- Prime Minister: ʻAkilisi Pōhiva; Semisi Sika (acting); Pohiva Tuʻiʻonetoa; Siaosi Sovaleni; ʻAisake Eke
- Preceded by: Sialeʻataongo Tuʻivakanō
- Succeeded by: ʻAlipate Tuʻivanuavou Vaea
- In office 19 July 2012 – 29 December 2014
- Prime Minister: Sialeʻataongo Tuʻivakanō
- Preceded by: Lord Lasike
- Succeeded by: Sialeʻataongo Tuʻivakanō

Member of Parliament for Ha‘apai (noble)
- Incumbent
- Assumed office 16 November 2017
- Preceded by: Lord Tuʻihaʻateiho
- In office 23 April 2008 – 26 November 2014
- Succeeded by: Havea Tu‘iha‘angana

Personal details
- Born: 20 March 1985 (age 41)
- Party: Independent
- Spouse: Krystal Fane Kite (m. 2014)
- Parents: Kinikinilau Tūtoatasi Fakafānua; Sinaitakala ʻOfeina ʻe he Langi

Fatafehi Kinikinilau Lolomana‘ia Fakafānua, 8th Lord Fakafānua (born 20 March 1985), is a Tongan politician and noble who has served as prime minister of Tonga since 18 December 2025. He is an extended member of the Tongan royal family.

Fakafānua was first elected to the Legislative Assembly as a member of the nobility in 2008. He served as Speaker of the Tongan Legislative Assembly from 2012 to 2014 and from 2017 to 2025.

== Biography ==
Fakafānua is the son of Princess Sinaitakala ʻOfeina ʻe he Langi and Kinikinilau Tūtoatasi, who was the 7th Lord Fakafānua and estate holder of Maʻufanga. He has a brother, Fakaola mei Langi ʻItafuaʻatonga Tūtoatasi Fakafānua and a sister, Sinaitakala Tu‘imatamoana ‘i Fanakavakilangi Fakafānua, who is married to Crown Prince Tupoutoʻa ʻUlukalala.

He was bestowed with the title Fakafānua, one of the thirty-three hereditary titles of the Tongan nobility, in April 2006, following his father's death the previous year. The title is attached to the estates of Maʻufanga (on Tongatapu), Ngaʻakau (on Vavaʻu) and Faleloa (on Haʻapai), and enables its holder to be elected to the Legislative Assembly as a representative of the nobility. In a 2008 by-election, he was elected as a representative for Haʻapai, making him the youngest member of the Tongan Parliament. He was re-elected in the November 2010 general election.

On 19 July 2012 Fakafānua was elected Speaker of the Tongan Legislative Assembly following Lord Lasike's removal from office, becoming the youngest individual to elected to the role. As Speaker he held a "practice parliament" to encourage women to participate in politics. He lost his seat at the 2014 election. At the 2017 election, he regained his seat and was re-elected Speaker. Following the 2021 election, he was re-elected Speaker for a third term.

Following the 2025 election, Fakafānua was elected prime minister on 15 December, receiving 16 votes. He defeated the incumbent, ʻAisake Eke, who garnered the support of 10 MPs. Fakafānua became the second nobles' representative to be elected head of government since democratisation. King Tupou VI formally appointed Fakafānua as prime minister on 18 December. Taking office at the age of 40, he became one of the youngest individuals to be prime minister. Fakafānua announced that he would retain Crown Prince Tupoutoʻa ʻUlukalala as foreign minister. Following the election, He declared his intention to nominate his cabinet ministers based on the consensus of all members of parliament. During the government formation, Fakafānua released a statement, indicating that he would consult his predecessor on cabinet appointments. Eke, however, denied this claim, and said he was only informed once the selections were made.

Fakafānua unveiled the rest of his cabinet lineup on 5 January 2026, shortly after the monarch approved his ministerial selections. Former Prime Ministers Siaosi Sovaleni, Sēmisi Sika and former Deputy Prime Minister Taniela Fusimalohi were included in his cabinet. Viliami Latu was appointed deputy prime minister, while the sole female MP, Fane Fotu Fituafe, was assigned the newly established internal affairs portfolio.

== Personal life ==
Fakafānua married Lady Krystal Fane Kite, a daughter of Sione Kite, who previously served as Tonga's High Commissioner to the United Kingdom and later as Ambassador to the United States, on 15 October 2014.

== Honours ==
National honours

- Knight Commander of the Order of Queen Sālote Tupou III (31 July 2008)

Legislative Assembly of Tonga
Preceded by Havea Hikuleʻo ʻoPulotu	Speaker of the Legislative Assembly; 2012–2014	Succeeded by Sialeʻataongo Tuʻivakanō
Preceded by Sialeʻataongo Tuʻivakanō	Speaker of the Legislative Assembly; 2017–2025	Succeeded by ʻAlipate Tuʻivanuavou Vaea
Political offices
Preceded by ʻAisake Eke	Prime Minister of Tonga; 2025–present	Incumbent
