= Tevita Lavemaau =

Tongan politician

Minister of Finance
- In office 10 October 2019 – 28 December 2021
- Prime Minister: Pohiva Tuʻiʻonetoa
- Preceded by: Pohiva Tuʻiʻonetoa
- Succeeded by: Tatafu Moeaki

Minister for Revenue and Customs
- In office 10 October 2019 – 28 December 2021
- Preceded by: Pohiva Tuʻiʻonetoa
- Succeeded by: Tatafu Moeaki

Minister of Finance
- In office 6 March 2017 – 1 September 2017
- Prime Minister: ʻAkilisi Pōhiva
- Preceded by: ʻAisake Eke
- Succeeded by: Pohiva Tuʻiʻonetoa

Minister for Revenue and Customs
- In office 30 December 2014 – 6 March 2017
- Preceded by: Sifa Tuʻutafaiva
- Succeeded by: Pohiva Tuʻiʻonetoa

Member of Parliament for ʻEua 11
- In office 27 November 2014 – 18 November 2021
- Preceded by: Sunia Fili
- Succeeded by: Taniela Fusimalohi

Personal details
- Party: None

Tevita Lavemaau is a Tongan politician and Member of the Legislative Assembly of Tonga.

Lavemaau was first elected at the 2014 Tongan general election and appointed Minister of Revenue and Customs. Following the resignation of ʻAisake Eke in March 2017 he was appointed Minister of Finance.

In September 2017 he and Deputy Prime Minister Siaosi Sovaleni were sacked for disloyalty for supporting King Tupou VI's decision to sack the Prime Minister, dissolve Parliament and call new elections. He was re-elected at the 2017 election, but not reappointed to Cabinet.

In 2019 following the death of ʻAkilisi Pōhiva he was appointed to the cabinet of Pohiva Tuʻiʻonetoa as Minister for Finance, Minister for Revenue and Customs and Minister responsible for Statistics.

He lost his seat in the 2021 Tongan general election.
