= 2017 Tongan general election =

- 16 November 2017
- All 26 elected seats in the Legislative Assembly; 14 seats needed for a majority
- Turnout: 67.14% (▼12.02pp)
Party	Leader	Vote %	Seats	+/–
Democrats	ʻAkilisi Pōhiva	44.53	14	+5
Independents	–	47.22	3	−5
This lists parties that won seats. See the complete results below.
Results by constituency
Prime Minister before	Prime Minister after
ʻAkilisi Pōhiva; Democrats	ʻAkilisi Pōhiva; Democrats

General elections were held in Tonga on 16 November 2017. Initially expected to be held in 2018, King Tupou VI called a snap election in August 2017. Parliamentary Speaker Sialeʻataongo Tuʻivakanō, who advised the monarch to dissolve parliament and call an early election, had expressed unease with attempts by Prime Minister ʻAkilisi Pōhiva and his government to remove certain powers from the monarch and the Privy Council. Despite legal and political experts disputing the legality of the dissolution, given that neither the monarch nor the speaker consulted Pōhiva on the matter, the prime minister declined to challenge the decision in court.

Prime Minister Pōhiva and his Democratic Party of the Friendly Islands (PTOA) had governed since 2014. Two parties contested the election, the PTOA and the newly founded Langafonua ʻa e Masiva. Many candidates focused on local issues during the campaign, while national issues were generally viewed as less important by numerous voters. The controversial ban of a popular talkback show on the Tonga Broadcasting Commission, which had been critical of the PTOA government, resulted in many candidates utilising grassroots campaigning. The PTOA went on to win a majority of seats, securing 14 of the 17 people's seats, allowing the party to form government without the need of any of other factions. Independents won three of the people's seats, while Langafonua ʻa e Masiva failed to enter parliament. Voter turnout was 67%, a decline from 79% in the 2014 election. The Legislative Assembly re-elected Pōhiva as prime minister on 18 December, defeating former Deputy Prime Minister Siaosi Sovaleni. Pōhiva's cabinet was inaugurated on 18 January 2018.

== Background ==
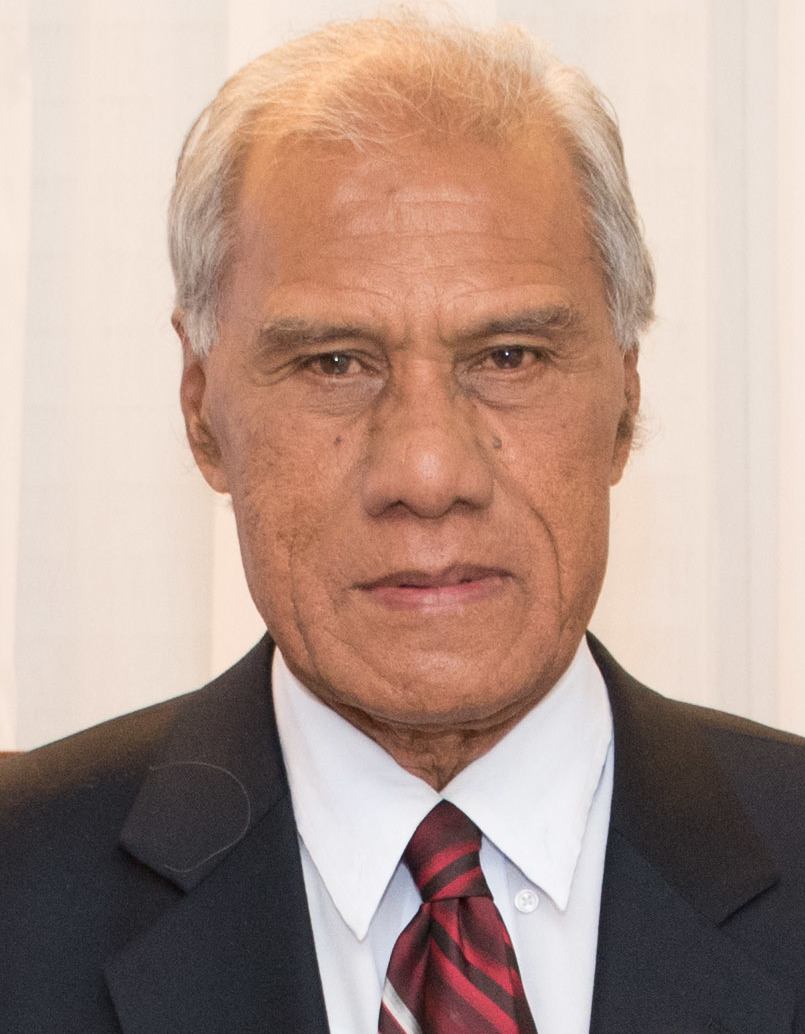
ʻAkilisi Pōhiva was elected prime minister in 2014, becoming the first commoner elected to the role

During the previous election, held in 2014, the PTOA, led by ‘Akilisi Pōhiva, won nine seats, while independents secured eight. Around half of the incumbent people's representatives lost their seats, as did one noble. Despite the election seeing a record 16 female candidates contest, no women were elected. Following the election, two MPs announced their candidacies for the parliamentary vote for prime minister, Pōhiva and Deputy Prime Minister Samiu Vaipulu. In the lead-up to the vote, Vaipulu emerged as the apparent favourite. Shortly before voting commenced on 29 December, a group of independents, led by Siaosi Sovaleni, switched their support to Pōhiva, who went on to defeat Vaipulu. Pōhiva became the first commoner to be elected prime minister and unveiled his cabinet the following day, Sovaleni became deputy prime minister. The outgoing prime minister, Sialeʻataongo Tuʻivakanō, was subsequently elected as the speaker of parliament. Pōhiva retained two incumbent ministers, one of whom, Maʻafu Tukuiʻaulahi, was also the sole noble member. In 2016, ʻAkosita Lavulavu became the first woman to be elected to parliament after democratisation, after winning a by-election. She succeeded her husband, former Education Minister ʻEtuate Lavulavu, who lost his seat after he was found guilty of bribery.

Pōhiva survived a no-confidence motion in February 2017, which had been led by most of the nobles' representatives, citing "poor governance, nepotism and favouritism". Supporters of the motion highlighted Pōhiva's appointment of his son as an advisor, although he did not receive a government salary. The prime minister dismissed the opposition's allegations, stating that these matters were sufficiently addressed. The motion garnered the support of 10 MPs, which included most of the nobles and some independents, while 14 MPs voted to keep Pōhiva in office. Finance Minister ‘Aisake Eke abstained and was reportedly forced to resign from cabinet shortly after.

On 24 August 2017, acting on the advice of Speaker Tuʻivakanō, King Tupou VI suddenly dissolved parliament, bringing forward elections that were originally planned for 2018. Tuʻivakanō accused Pōhiva of seeking to remove certain powers from the monarch and privy council, including the authority to appoint the attorney-general and police commissioner. The speaker also claimed that the PTOA had attempted to ratify the Convention on the Elimination of All Forms of Discrimination Against Women (CEDAW) while evading the monarch's approval. CEDAW was initially supported by the government, but became controversial in Tonga due to allegations that it would pave the way for the legalisation of same-sex marriage and that it was anti-Christian. Following protests and public outcry, the government withdrew its support for CEDAW. The dissolution occurred amidst a strained relationship between the monarch and Pōhiva. The prime minister characterised the situation as a "failed coup", stating that his opponents were unable to oust his administration completely, as it remained in government in a caretaker capacity. While several legal and political commentators believed the dissolution lacked legal legitimacy due its justifications, Pōhiva ultimately declined to bring the matter before the courts. Shortly after parliament was dissolved, Pōhiva dismissed Sovaleni as deputy prime minister, who was succeeded by Tukuiʻaulahi.

== Electoral system ==
The Legislative Assembly of Tonga has up to 30 members, of which 17 are directly elected by first-past-the-post voting from single-member constituencies. The island of Tongatapu has ten constituencies, Vavaʻu three, Haʻapai two and ʻEua and Niuatoputapu/Niuafoʻou have one each. Nine seats are held by members of the nobility who elect representatives amongst themselves. The Cabinet formed by a prime minister may include up to four members not elected to the Assembly, who then automatically become members of the legislature. Unless the monarch dissolves the Legislative Assembly early, members serve a four-year term.

Candidates and voters are required to be at least 21 years old and hold Tongan citizenship. Ineligible voters include those who have served a prison sentence of at least two years and individuals convicted of a criminal offence. To qualify, candidates are required to be eligible voters and present in Tonga for at least a three-month period within the six months before an election. Candidates running for a people's seat also require the signatures of at least 50 qualified electors from the constituency they contest and a deposit to be paid. Individuals subject to legal action for outstanding debt are ineligible to be contestants. Contestants for the People's Seats were also required to undergo a legal clearance to qualify. The nobles, however, were exempt from this procedure. A total of 59,003 individuals were registered to vote in this election.

== Candidates and campaign ==
A total of 86 candidates contested the people's seats, a decrease from 106 in 2014. There were 15 female candidates, one less than in the previous election. Prime Minister Pōhiva's PTOA Party fielded 17 candidates. The Langafonua ʻa e Masiva party was established on 29 September and ran eight candidates. Neither the party's chair, ‘Emeli Pouvalu, nor her deputy, Saia Moehau, contested the election.

Many candidates were reportedly more visible during the campaign period than in previous elections. A popular Tonga Broadcasting Commission (TBC) talkback show, which served as a platform to deliberate on election issues, was canned before the election. Prime Minister Pōhiva had frequently clashed with the TBC, labelling it an enemy of his government. In light of the ban, the campaign period saw an uptick of candidates engaging in more grassroots methods, including door-to-door canvassing, than in previous election cycles. As such, voters were predominantly more concerned about local issues than nationwide affairs. The PTOA primarily campaigned on regaining confidence from the electorate and continuing its accomplishments in government. Critics, such as journalist Kalafi Moala, questioned what achievements the PTOA was alluding to and highlighted the government's scandals from the previous term. The Langafonua ʻa e Masiva party platform focused on advocating for higher wages, introducing a provision for local government in the constitution and decreasing youth unemployment.

== Conduct ==
After dissolving parliament on 24 August, the monarch issued the election writ on 5 September. Candidate nominations were open from 27 to 28 September, while voter registration closed on 2 November. At the government's invitation, the Commonwealth of Nations and the Pacific Islands Forum sent delegations for the first time to observe the elections. The campaign period concluded on 15 November. On election day, polling for the people's seats commenced at 9:00 and concluded at 16:00. Voting for the nobles' representatives occurred from 10:00 to 12:00; the election supervisor, Pita Vuki, announced the results for these seats an hour after the nobles' polling concluded. Vuki announced the successful candidates for the people's seats shortly before 22:00. The electoral commission did not receive any complaints about the election conduct or any applications from candidates for recounts by the deadline.

== Results ==
The PTOA secured a majority of seats, winning 14 of the people's seats, while the other three went to independents. None of the Langafonua ʻa e Masiva candidates were successful. Only 47% of the electorate, who participated, voted for the winning candidates, while 10 of the people's representatives were elected by pluralities. Seven of the nobles' representatives were returned to parliament. Nikotimasi Fatafehi Laufilitonga Kakau Vahaʻi and incumbent MP ʻAlipate Tuʻivanuavou Vaea, were tied for the Tongatapu noble constituency's third seat, with seven votes each. Election Supervisor Vuki conducted a coin toss to break the tie, resulting in Vahaʻi securing the seat. Two women were elected, incumbent Lavulavu and a newcomer. Voter turnout reached 67%, a decrease from 79% in 2014.

Party	Votes	%	Seats	+/–
Democratic Party of the Friendly Islands	17,610	44.53	14	+5
Langafonua ʻa e Masiva	3,261	8.25	0	New
Independents	18,674	47.22	3	–5
Nobles' representatives			9	0
Total	39,545	100.00	26	0
Valid votes	39,545	99.83		
Invalid/blank votes	68	0.17		
Total votes	39,613	100.00		
Registered voters/turnout	59,003	67.14		
Source: TEC, IFES, Matangi Tonga, Kaniva Tonga

=== By constituency ===
Tongatapu 1
Candidate	Party	Votes	%
ʻAkilisi Pōhiva	Democratic Party of the Friendly Islands	1,379	50.57
Netatua Pelesikoti	Independent	352	12.91
Sione Tukia	Independent	279	10.23
Ofo-Mei-Vaha Tupou Niumeitolu	Independent	196	7.19
Mosese Teukiveiuto Manuofetoa	Independent	128	4.69
Siotame Drew Havea	Independent	109	4.00
Siale ʻAtaongo Puloka	Independent	80	2.93
ʻAna Kanume Bing Fonua	Independent	79	2.90
Sione Keuate Tupouniua	Independent	62	2.27
Barry Smith Taukolo	Independent	49	1.80
ʻEliesa Fifita	Independent	14	0.51
Total		2,727	100.00
Valid votes		2,727	99.74
Invalid/blank votes		7	0.26
Total votes		2,734	100.00
Source: Tonga Elections

Tongatapu 2
Candidate	Party	Votes	%
Semisi Sika	Democratic Party of the Friendly Islands	1,111	52.09
Sione Tuʻitavake Fonua	Langafonua ʻa e Masiva	465	21.80
Soane Patita Vakautafefine Fifita	Independent	277	12.99
ʻEma Rererangi Fonua Stephenson	Independent	260	12.19
Fisiʻipeau Faiva	Independent	20	0.94
Total		2,133	100.00
Valid votes		2,133	99.86
Invalid/blank votes		3	0.14
Total votes		2,136	100.00
Source: Tonga Elections

Tongatapu 3
Candidate	Party	Votes	%
Siaosi Sovaleni	Independent	1,421	44.34
Tevita Palu	Independent	932	29.08
Katalina Tohi	Democratic Party of the Friendly Islands	607	18.94
Mele Teusivi ʻAmanaki	Independent	159	4.96
Sitiveni Halapua	Independent	83	2.59
Tonga Soane	Independent	3	0.09
Total		3,205	100.00
Valid votes		3,205	99.84
Invalid/blank votes		5	0.16
Total votes		3,210	100.00
Source: Tonga Elections

Tongatapu 4
Candidate	Party	Votes	%
Mateni Tapueluelu	Democratic Party of the Friendly Islands	1,469	60.80
Seketi Foʻou Fuko	Independent	388	16.06
ʻIsileli Pulu	Langafonua ʻa e Masiva	216	8.94
Tevita Mateitalo Makameimoana Motulalo	Independent	138	5.71
Poli Tuaileva	Independent	136	5.63
Litia Simpson	Independent	69	2.86
Total		2,416	100.00
Valid votes		2,416	99.75
Invalid/blank votes		6	0.25
Total votes		2,422	100.00
Source: Tonga Elections

Tongatapu 5
Candidate	Party	Votes	%
Losaline Maʻasi	Democratic Party of the Friendly Islands	1,034	35.40
ʻAisake Eke	Langafonua ʻa e Masiva	953	32.63
ʻAna Hauʻalofaʻia Koloto	Independent	527	18.04
Feʻofaʻaki Taufonua Latu	Independent	311	10.65
Viliami Kini Mangisi	Independent	96	3.29
Total		2,921	100.00
Valid votes		2,921	99.80
Invalid/blank votes		6	0.20
Total votes		2,927	100.00
Source: Tonga Elections

Tongatapu 6
Candidate	Party	Votes	%
Poasi Tei	Democratic Party of the Friendly Islands	1,425	48.77
Soane Taiofonongahina ʻAhio	Independent	672	23.00
Siosifa Tuʻitupou Tuʻutafaiva	Langafonua ʻa e Masiva	425	14.54
Sione Tatafu Angakehe Tafuna	Independent	325	11.12
Fisiʻitotoa ʻAhohiva Kaufusi	Independent	75	2.57
Total		2,922	100.00
Valid votes		2,922	99.83
Invalid/blank votes		5	0.17
Total votes		2,927	100.00
Source: Tonga Elections

Tongatapu 7
Candidate	Party	Votes	%
Sione Vuna Faʻotusia	Democratic Party of the Friendly Islands	1,273	48.74
Sione Sangster Saulala	Langafonua ʻa e Masiva	726	27.79
Mavaetangi Manavahetau	Independent	217	8.31
Sione Hufanga	Independent	191	7.31
ʻOlikoni Tanaki	Independent	133	5.09
Talanoa Fuka Kitekeiʻaho	Independent	63	2.41
Tevita Silatolu	Independent	9	0.34
Total		2,612	100.00
Valid votes		2,612	99.85
Invalid/blank votes		4	0.15
Total votes		2,616	100.00
Source: Tonga Elections

Tongatapu 8
Candidate	Party	Votes	%
Semisi Fakahau	Democratic Party of the Friendly Islands	1,182	46.90
Viliami Sisifa	Independent	596	23.65
Penisimani Teisina	Independent	484	19.21
Mosaʻati Vaipulu	Independent	187	7.42
Viliami Kilisimasi Taufa	Independent	71	2.82
Total		2,520	100.00
Valid votes		2,520	99.76
Invalid/blank votes		6	0.24
Total votes		2,526	100.00
Source: Tonga Elections

Tongatapu 9
Candidate	Party	Votes	%
Penisimani Fifita	Democratic Party of the Friendly Islands	1,302	49.75
Siamelie Latu	Independent	537	20.52
Vika Vaka Fusimalohi	Independent	488	18.65
Timote Tuʻiono Oliveti Laume	Independent	290	11.08
Total		2,617	100.00
Valid votes		2,617	99.96
Invalid/blank votes		1	0.04
Total votes		2,618	100.00
Source: Tonga Elections

Tongatapu 10
Candidate	Party	Votes	%
Pōhiva Tuʻiʻonetoa	Democratic Party of the Friendly Islands	1,631	58.17
Soane Kautai	Independent	593	21.15
Loupua Kuli	Independent	406	14.48
Daniel Kimball Fale	Independent	174	6.21
Total		2,804	100.00
Valid votes		2,804	99.86
Invalid/blank votes		4	0.14
Total votes		2,808	100.00
Source: Tonga Elections

ʻEua 11
Candidate	Party	Votes	%
Tevita Lavemaau	Independent	789	37.46
Taniela Fusimalohi	Independent	519	24.64
Sunia Fili	Langafonua ʻa e Masiva	476	22.60
Sunia Kauvaka Havea	Democratic Party of the Friendly Islands	310	14.72
Hale Telepo	Independent	6	0.28
Silivia Loumaile Mahe	Independent	6	0.28
Total		2,106	100.00
Valid votes		2,106	99.91
Invalid/blank votes		2	0.09
Total votes		2,108	100.00
Source: Tonga Elections

Haʻapai 12
Candidate	Party	Votes	%
Moʻale Finau	Democratic Party of the Friendly Islands	635	39.84
Viliami Hingano	Independent	588	36.89
Finau Pulotu Uata	Independent	371	23.27
Total		1,594	100.00
Valid votes		1,594	99.75
Invalid/blank votes		4	0.25
Total votes		1,598	100.00
Source: Tonga Elections

Haʻapai 13
Candidate	Party	Votes	%
Veivosa Taka	Democratic Party of the Friendly Islands	905	56.88
ʻEsafe Hema Latu	Independent	589	37.02
ʻElikisoni Langi	Independent	97	6.10
Total		1,591	100.00
Valid votes		1,591	99.81
Invalid/blank votes		3	0.19
Total votes		1,594	100.00
Source: Tonga Elections

Vavaʻu 14
Candidate	Party	Votes	%
Saia Piukala	Democratic Party of the Friendly Islands	1,366	61.28
Latu Niua Lepolo	Independent	495	22.21
Matini Fatanitavake Maʻafu-ʻo-Veikune T. Veikune	Independent	368	16.51
Total		2,229	100.00
Valid votes		2,229	99.91
Invalid/blank votes		2	0.09
Total votes		2,231	100.00
Source: Tonga Elections

Vavaʻu 15
Candidate	Party	Votes	%
Samiu Vaipulu	Independent	684	32.33
Tomifa Faingaʻa Paea	Democratic Party of the Friendly Islands	608	28.73
Kulufeinga ʻAnisi Bloomfield	Independent	494	23.35
Keuli Pasina Lavaki	Independent	184	8.70
Sinali Feʻiloaki Hansen	Independent	83	3.92
Tongovua Fifita	Independent	63	2.98
Total		2,116	100.00
Valid votes		2,116	99.76
Invalid/blank votes		5	0.24
Total votes		2,121	100.00
Source: Tonga Elections

Vavaʻu 16
Candidate	Party	Votes	%
ʻAkosita Lavulavu	Democratic Party of the Friendly Islands	935	42.99
Viliami Latu	Independent	748	34.39
ʻAtalasa Misilemoti Pouvalu	Independent	296	13.61
Viliami Lolohea	Independent	174	8.00
ʻAisea Silivenusi	Independent	22	1.01
Total		2,175	100.00
Valid votes		2,175	99.77
Invalid/blank votes		5	0.23
Total votes		2,180	100.00
Source: Tonga Elections

Ongo Niua 17
Candidate	Party	Votes	%
Vatau Hui	Democratic Party of the Friendly Islands	438	51.11
Sosefo Feʻaomoeata Vakata	Independent	419	48.89
Total		857	100.00
Valid votes		857	100.00
Invalid/blank votes		0	0.00
Total votes		857	100.00
Source: Tonga Elections

=== Nobles ===
Constituency	Elected candidate	Votes
‘Eua	Lord Nuku	10
Ha‘apai	Lord Tuʻihaʻangana	5
Ha‘apai	Fatafehi Fakafanua	3
Niuatoputapu and Niuafo'ou	Mataʻiʻulua ʻi Fonuamotu	3
Tongatapu	Sialeʻataongo Tuʻivakanō	12
Tongatapu	Maʻafu Tukuiʻaulahi	11
Tongatapu	Lord Vaha‘i	7
Vava‘u	Malakai Fakatoufifita	6
Vava‘u	Tonga Tuʻiʻafitu	5
Source: Radio New Zealand

== Aftermath ==
One of the successful PTOA contestants described the party's victory as the public's rebuke of the early parliamentary dissolution. Moala said the PTOA's triumph was surprising, due to the early dissolution, but that it demonstrated Prime Minister Pōhiva remained the "most dominant" figure to influence Tonga's political landscape. Moala also stated that the result indicated the PTOA's scandals did not affect the party's standing at the polls. Parliament convened on 18 December to elect a prime minister. In addition to incumbent Prime Minister Pōhiva, his former deputy, Sovaleni, was also nominated. Pōhiva received 14 votes and secured another term, narrowly defeating Sovaleni, who received the votes of 12 MPs. The monarch formally appointed Pōhiva to a second term on 2 January 2018, and opened parliament on 11 January. Most of the cabinet ministers were sworn in on 18 January; however, the foreign affairs and defence portfolios were not immediately filled.

Pōhiva governed until his death in 2019. With the absence of a clear successor, the PTOA began to fragment shortly after. Finance Minister Pōhiva Tuʻiʻonetoa, who defected from the PTOA and formed the Tonga People's Party, contested the parliamentary vote to succeed Pōhiva, facing Deputy Prime Minister Sēmisi Sika. Tu‘i‘onetoa was backed by independents, three fellow PTOA defectors and some of the nobles, and went on to defeat Sika, whom the PTOA caucus supported. As a result, the PTOA fell into opposition mid-term.
