= Tongatapu 2 =

Electoral constituency in Tonga

- Constituency for the Legislative Assembly of Tonga
- Region: Tongatapu

Current constituency
- Created: 2010
- Number of members: 1
- Party: Independent
- Member: Alvin Sika (elect)

Tongatapu 2 is an electoral constituency for the Legislative Assembly in the Kingdom of Tonga. It was established for the November 2010 general election, when the multi-seat regional constituencies for People's Representatives were replaced by single-seat constituencies, electing one representative via the first past the post electoral system. Located on the country's main island, Tongatapu, it encompasses part of Kolofoʻou (a district of the capital city, Nukuʻalofa), and the villages of Fanga-ʻo-Pilolevu, Mailetaha, Haveluloto, Tofoa, and Koloua.

Its first representative was Sēmisi Sika, of the Democratic Party of the Friendly Islands. Sika, a first time MP, defeated Viliami Tangi, the incumbent Minister for Health, who had sat in Parliament as a minister but had not been an elected MP. Sika held the seat by wide margins in 2014 and 2017, but lost to ʻUhilamoelangi Fasi in 2021. In a rematch, Sika reclaimed the constituency from Fasi in 2025. In 2026, however, the Supreme Court convicted Sika for exceeding election expenses, and he was removed from parliament. His brother, Alvin Sika, won the subsequent by-election, held on 8 October.

== Members of Parliament ==
Election	Member	Party
2010	Sēmisi Sika	Democratic Party of the Friendly Islands
2014	Sēmisi Sika	Democratic Party of the Friendly Islands
2017	Sēmisi Sika	Democratic Party of the Friendly Islands
2021	ʻUhilamoelangi Fasi	Independent
2025	Sēmisi Sika	Independent
2026 by-election	Alvin Sika	Independent

== Election results ==
=== Elections in the 2020s ===
2026 by-election
Candidate	Party	Votes	%
Alvin Sika	Independent	609	40.82
Malakai Koloamatangi	Independent	262	17.56
Lei Pa‘asi	Independent	248	16.62
‘Illaisa Lepolo Taunisila	Independent	107	7.17
Samiuela Vea	Independent	93	6.23
‘Olioni Manoa	Independent	56	3.75
Sione Harvard Tupouniua	Independent	56	3.75
Mele ‘Amanaki	Independent	52	3.49
Mounu Uaisele	Independent	9	0.60
Total		1,492	100.00
Valid votes		1,492	100.00
Invalid/blank votes		0	0.00
Total votes		1,492	100.00
Registered voters/turnout		4,028	37.04
Source: Matangi Tonga, TEC (turnout)

2025 general election
Candidate	Party	Votes	%
Sēmisi Sika	Independent	951	55.45
ʻUhilamoelangi Fasi	Independent	764	44.55
Total		1,715	100.00
Valid votes		1,715	99.88
Invalid/blank votes		2	0.12
Total votes		1,717	100.00
Registered voters/turnout		3,890	44.14
Source: Matangi Tonga, TEC

2021 general election
Candidate	Party	Votes	%
ʻUhilamoelangi Fasi	Independent	962	48.93
Sēmisi Sika	Democrats	796	40.49
Soane Patita Fifita	Independent	208	10.58
Total		1,966	100.00
Registered voters/turnout		3,674	–
Source: Matangi Tonga

=== Elections in the 2010s ===
2017 general election
Candidate	Party	Votes	%
Sēmisi Sika	Democrats	1,111	52.09
Sione Tuʻitavake Fonua	Langafonua ʻa e Masiva	465	21.80
Soane Patita Fifita	Independent	277	12.99
ʻEma Fonua Stephenson	Independent	260	12.19
Fisiʻipeau Faiva	Independent	20	0.94
Total		2,133	100.00
Valid votes		2,133	99.86
Invalid/blank votes		3	0.14
Total votes		2,136	100.00
Source: Matangi Tonga, Tonga Elections

2014 general election
Candidate	Party	Votes	%
Sēmisi Sika	Democrats	1,091	48.36
Sione Tuʻitavake Fonua	Independent	543	24.07
Tevita Kaituʻu Fotu	Independent	436	19.33
Soane Patita Fifita	Independent	186	8.24
Total		2,256	100.00
Valid votes		2,256	99.60
Invalid/blank votes		9	0.40
Total votes		2,265	100.00
Source: TEC, Psephos

2010 general election
Candidate	Party	Votes	%
Sēmisi Sika	Democrats	849	37.90
Viliami Tangi	Independent	641	28.62
Malia ʻAlisi Taumoepeau	Independent	306	13.66
Sione Tuʻitavake Fonua	PLT	181	8.08
Siale ʻAtaongo Puloka	Independent	111	4.96
Mele Teusivi ʻAmanaki	Democratic Labor	65	2.90
Tevita Kaituʻu Fotu	Independent	49	2.19
Sitafooti ʻAho	Independent	26	1.16
Sēmisi ʻUluʻave Mila	Independent	12	0.54
Total		2,240	100.00
Source: Matangi Tonga

== See also ==
- Constituencies of Tonga
