= Constituencies of Tonga =

Constituencies used for elections to the Tongan Parliament

Constituencies of Tonga are used for elections to the Legislative Assembly of Tonga.

== List of constituencies ==
=== People's representatives ===
- Tongatapu 1
- Tongatapu 2
- Tongatapu 3
- Tongatapu 4
- Tongatapu 5
- Tongatapu 6
- Tongatapu 7
- Tongatapu 8
- Tongatapu 9
- Tongatapu 10
- ʻEua 11
- Haʻapai 12
- Haʻapai 13
- Vavaʻu 14
- Vavaʻu 15
- Vavaʻu 16
- Niua 17

=== Noble representatives ===
- ʻEua Nobles' constituency
- Haʻapai Nobles' constituency
- Niuas Nobles' constituency
- Tongatapu Nobles' constituency
- Vavaʻu Nobles' constituency
