= Tongatapu 3 =

Electoral constituency in Tonga

- Constituency for the Legislative Assembly of Tonga
- Region: Tongatapu

Current constituency
- Created: 2010
- Number of members: 1
- Party: Independent
- Member: Siaosi Sovaleni

Tongatapu 3 is an electoral constituency for the Legislative Assembly in the Kingdom of Tonga. It was established for the November 2010 general election, when the multi-seat regional constituencies for People's Representatives were replaced by single-seat constituencies, electing one representative via the first past the post electoral system. Located on the country's main island, Tongatapu, it encompasses parts of Kolofoʻou and Maʻufanga (districts of the capital city Nukuʻalofa), and the entirety of the villages of Pahu, ʻAmaile, Fasi-moe-afi-ʻa-Tungi, Ngeleʻia, Mataika, and Halaleva.

Its first ever representative is Sitiveni Halapua, of the Democratic Party of the Friendly Islands. Halapua, a first time MP, defeated Clive Edwards, an incumbent MP and former Deputy Prime Minister. (Edwards was nonetheless subsequently appointed Minister for Justice, thus obtaining a seat in Parliament ex officio.) For the 2014 election, Halapua was deselected by the party, which endorsed Simote Vea as its candidate to replace him. Vea was defeated by independent candidate Siaosi Sovaleni, resulting in the DPFI losing the seat.

== Members of Parliament ==
Election	Member	Party
2010	Sitiveni Halapua	Democratic Party of the Friendly Islands
2014	Siaosi Sovaleni	Independent
2017	Siaosi Sovaleni	Independent
2021	Siaosi Sovaleni	Independent
2025	Siaosi Sovaleni	Independent

== Election results ==
=== 2025 ===
Tongan general election, 2025: Tongatapu 3
Party	Candidate	Votes	%	±%
Independent	Siaosi Sovaleni	1239	72.75	–10.54
Independent	Gabriella Renne Blake ʻIlolahia	464	27.25	+12.22
Turnout		1703		
Majority		775	45.51	–27.76
Independent hold		Swing	–10.54	

=== 2021 ===
Tongan general election, 2021: Tongatapu 3
Party	Candidate	Votes	%	±%
Independent	Siaosi Sovaleni	2084	83.29	+38.95
Independent	Gabriella Renne Blake ʻIlolahia	376	15.03	n/a
Independent	Fisiʻipeau Faiva	42	1.68	n/a
Turnout		2502		
Majority		1708	68.27	+53.01
Independent hold		Swing	+38.95	

=== 2017 ===
Tongan general election, 2017: Tongatapu 3
Party	Candidate	Votes	%	±%
Independent	Siaosi Sovaleni	1421	44.34	+10.34
Independent	Tevita Palu	932	29.08	+5.08
Democrats	Katalina Tohi	607	18.94	n/a
Independent	Mele Teusivi ʻAmanaki	159	4.96	–0.04
Independent	Sitiveni Halapua	83	2.59	n/a
Independent	Tonga Soane	3	0.09	n/a
Turnout		3205		
Majority		489	15.26	+5.26
Independent hold		Swing	+10.34	

=== 2014 ===
Tongan general election, 2014: Tongatapu 3
Party	Candidate	Votes	%	±%
Independent	Siaosi Sovaleni	975	34.0	n/a
(unknown)	Tevita Palu	688	24.0	n/a
PDP	Clive Edwards	503	17.5	−7.5
Democrats	Simote Vea	440	15.3	−23.2
DLP	Mele ‘Amanaki	142	5.0	+1.2
(unknown)	Gabriella ‘Ilolahia	107	3.7	n/a
(unknown)	Paula Lavulo	13	0.5	n/a
Turnout		2868		
Majority		287	10.0	n/a
Independent gain from Democrats		Swing	18.7	

=== 2010 ===
Tongan general election, 2010: Tongatapu 3
Party	Candidate	Votes	%	±%
Democrats	Sitiveni Halapua	1047	38.5	n/a
PDP	Clive Edwards	681	25.0	n/a
(unknown)	Viliami Takau	289	10.6	n/a
(unknown)	Penisimani Vea	257	9.4	n/a
(unknown)	David Kaveinga Vaka	191	7.0	n/a
DLP	Betty Blake	103	3.8	n/a
(unknown)	Sione ʻUhilamoelangi Liavaʻa	83	3.1	n/a
(unknown)	Falakiko Karl Taufaeteau	35	1.3	n/a
(unknown)	Pesalili Kailahi	23	0.8	n/a
(unknown)	Semisi Nauto Tuapasi ʻAtaʻata	12	0.4	n/a
Turnout		2721		
Majority		366	13.5	n/a
Democrats win (new seat)				

== See also ==
- Constituencies of Tonga
