= ʻUhilamoelangi Fasi =

Tongan politician

Minister for Education
- Incumbent
- Assumed office 28 January 2025
- Prime Minister: ʻAisake Eke
- Preceded by: Siaosi Sovaleni

Minister for Lands and Natural Resources
- Incumbent
- Assumed office 28 January 2025
- Preceded by: Tonga Tuʻiʻafitu

Member of Parliament for Tongatapu 2
- In office 18 November 2021 – 20 November 2025
- Preceded by: Sēmisi Sika
- Succeeded by: Sēmisi Sika

ʻUhilamoelangi Fasi is a Tongan politician, academic, and former Cabinet Minister.

He worked as chair of the Pacific Community's Pacific Qualifications Advisory Board. He was first elected to the Legislative Assembly of Tonga in the 2021 Tongan general election, winning the Tongatapu 2 seat from Semisi Sika.

On 28 January 2025 he was appointed to the cabinet of ʻAisake Eke as Minister for Education and Minister for Lands and Natural Resources. He lost his seat in the 2025 election.
