= Losaline Maʻasi =

Tongan politician and cabinet minister

The Honourable Losaline Maʻasi MLA
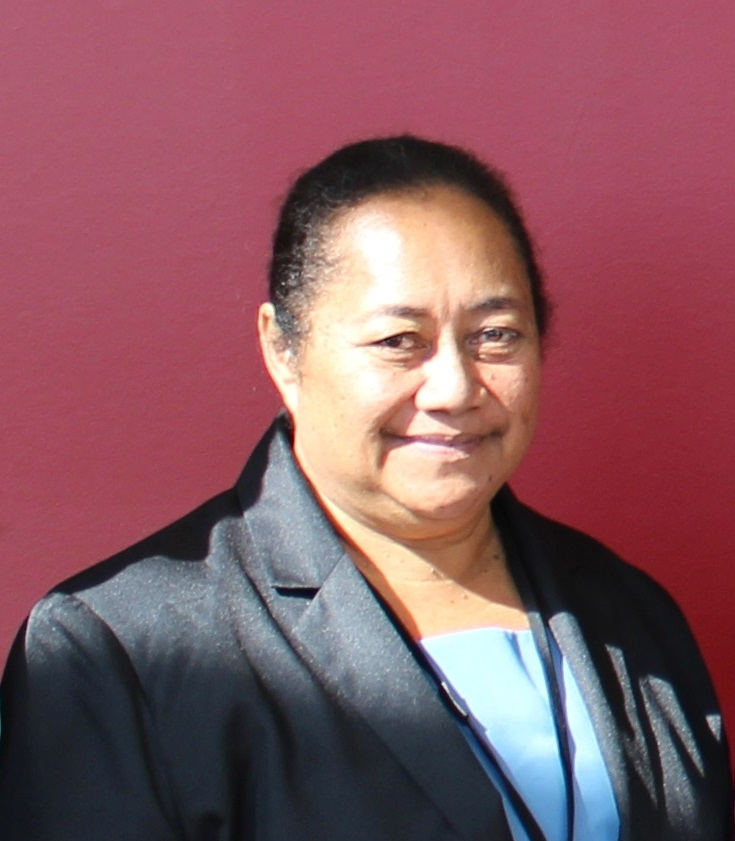
- Maʻasi in 2017

Minister for Agriculture, Food, and Forests
- In office 23 January 2019 – 10 October 2019
- Prime Minister: ʻAkilisi Pōhiva
- Preceded by: Semisi Fakahau
- Succeeded by: Lord Tuʻilakepa

Minister for Internal Affairs and Sports
- In office 26 June 2018 – 21 January 2019
- Preceded by: ʻAkosita Lavulavu
- Succeeded by: Saia Piukala

Member of Parliament for Tongatapu 5
- In office 16 November 2017 – 18 November 2021
- Preceded by: ʻAisake Eke
- Succeeded by: ʻAisake Eke

Personal details
- Party: Democratic Party of the Friendly Islands

Losaline Maʻasi is a Tongan politician, cabinet minister, and former member of the Legislative Assembly of Tonga for Tongatapu 5.

Maʻasi is a former chief executive of the Ministry of Agriculture. She was first elected to parliament in the 2017 election. On 26 June 2018 she was appointed Minister of Internal Affairs and Sports, replacing ʻAkosita Lavulavu. In January 2019 a minor cabinet reshuffle saw her swap her Internal Affairs portfolio for Agriculture, Food, and Forests.

She contested the 2021 Tongan general election, but was unsuccessful.
