= 2021 Tongan general election =

- 18 November 2021
- All 26 elected seats in the Legislative Assembly; 14 seats needed for a majority
- Turnout: 61.92% (▼5.22pp)
Party	Leader	Seats	+/–
Democrats	Disputed (Note: During the election, the PTOA leadership was disputed between Sēmisi Sika and Siaosi Pōhiva)	3	−11
PAK	Pōhiva Tuʻiʻonetoa	1	New
Independents	–	13	+10
This lists parties that won seats. See the complete results below.
Prime Minister before	Prime Minister after
Pōhiva Tuʻiʻonetoa; PAK	Siaosi Sovaleni; Independent

General elections were held in Tonga on 18 November 2021. Following the death of Prime Minister ʻAkilisi Pōhiva in 2019, the governing Democratic Party of the Friendly Islands (PTOA) fragmented and went into opposition. Finance Minister Pōhiva Tuʻiʻonetoa subsequently left the PTOA and formed the Tonga People's Party (PAK). He ascended to premiership after garnering the support of fellow PTOA defectors, independents and some of the nobles' representatives. Shortly before the election, the PTOA was divided into two factions: the Core Team, led by former Deputy Prime Minister Sēmisi Sika, and the People's Team, headed by Siaosi Pōhiva, the son of ʻAkilisi Pōhiva.

Major campaign issues included government corruption and the COVID-19 pandemic. Prime Minister Tu‘i‘onetoa and his allies did not promote the PAK during the campaign, reportedly due to the imprisonment of its deputy leader, ‘Etuate Lavulavu, for corruption. The two PTOA factions ran separate candidate lists, and despite receiving the most votes in numerous constituencies, the party only won three seats due to vote splitting between the groups. Both Sika and Pōhiva also lost their seats. Prime Minister Tuʻiʻonetoa was the only successful candidate from the PAK, while independents won 13 seats. No women were elected. Following the election, former Deputy Prime Minister Siaosi Sovaleni and former Finance Minister ʻAisake Eke contested the parliamentary election for prime minister. Tuʻiʻonetoa initially ran, but later withdrew due to insufficient support and backed Eke. Sovaleni went on to defeat Eke, and he assumed office on 27 December. Three cabinet ministers later lost their seats after being found guilty in court of engaging in corruption during the election.

== Background ==
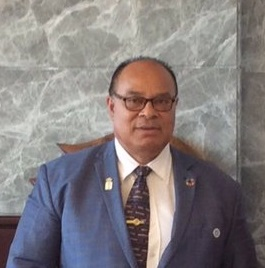
Pōhiva Tuʻiʻonetoa was elected prime minister in 2019 following the death of ʻAkilisi Pōhiva

The 2017 snap election was called by King Tupou VI on the advice of the then parliamentary speaker, Sialeʻataongo Tuʻivakanō. Prime Minister ‘Akilisi Pōhiva was not consulted by the monarch, with whom he had a strained relationship. Tuʻivakanō stated that he had resorted to an early election, claiming that Pōhiva intended to transfer the powers of the monarch and privy council to cabinet. Pōhiva declined to challenge the monarch's decision, and his PTOA party went to secure a landslide victory, winning 14 of the 17 people's seats. Following the election, the Legislative Assembly re-elected Pōhiva as prime minister, receiving 14 votes. He defeated former Deputy Prime Minister Siaosi Sovaleni, the only other contender for the premiership, who received the support of 12 MPs. Pōhiva died in September 2019, and the PTOA began to fragment shortly after, with no clear successor emerging. Two individuals ran in the parliamentary vote to succeed Pōhiva, Acting Prime Minister Sēmisi Sika and Finance Minister Pōhiva Tuʻiʻonetoa, who left the party after Pōhiva's death and formed the Tonga People's Party (PAK). Tuʻiʻonetoa garnered the support of the nobles, independents and three fellow defectors from the PTOA, and went on to defeat Sika, whom the remaining members backed. As a result, the PTOA was pushed out of government and fell into opposition. Tuʻiʻonetoa's cabinet included three nobles, who were excluded under Pōhiva.

In December 2020, Sika submitted a no-confidence motion against Tuʻiʻonetoa. Deputy Prime Minister Sione Vuna Faʻotusia supported the motion and subsequently resigned from cabinet. On 12 January 2021, the Legislative Assembly defeated the motion, with 13 MPs voting to strike it down and nine members, including the PTOA MPs, voting for it.

In June 2021, months before the election, Infrastructure and Tourism Minister ʻAkosita Lavulavu and her husband, PAK deputy leader and former cabinet minister ʻEtuate Lavulavu, were convicted of obtaining money on false pretences. The Supreme Court sentenced the couple to six years in prison.

== Electoral system ==
The Legislative Assembly of Tonga has up to 30 members, of which 17 are directly elected by first-past-the-post voting from single-member constituencies. The island of Tongatapu has ten constituencies, Vavaʻu three, Haʻapai two and ʻEua and the Niuas have one each. Nine seats are held by members of the nobility who elect representatives amongst themselves. The cabinet formed by a prime minister may include up to four members not elected to the Assembly, who then automatically become members of the legislature. Unless the monarch dissolves the Legislative Assembly early, members serve a four-year term.

Candidates and voters are required to be at least 21 years old and hold Tongan citizenship. Ineligible voters include those who have served a prison sentence of at least two years and individuals convicted of a criminal offence. To qualify, candidates are required to be eligible voters and present in Tonga for at least a three-month period within the six months before an election. Candidates running for a people's seat also require the signatures of at least 50 qualified electors from the constituency they contest and a deposit to be paid. Individuals subject to legal action for outstanding debt are ineligible to be contestants. Contestants for the people's seats were also required to undergo a legal clearance to qualify. The nobles, however, were exempt from this procedure. A total of 62,253 individuals were registered to vote in this election.

== Candidates and campaign ==
A total of 75 people's candidates were registered to contest the election. The total, however, later decreased to 72, after one candidate died and two others withdrew from the race. There were 12 female candidates, down from 16 in 2017. Amidst internal division and turmoil, the PTOA was split into two rival factions going into the election: the People's Board and the PTOA Core Team. Siaosi Pōhiva, the son of ‘Akilisi Pōhiva, led the People's Board, while former Deputy Prime Minister Sēmisi Sika headed the Core Team faction. Both factions fielded their own candidate lists, competing against one another. An informal bloc of independent candidates emerged, which was reportedly led by Education Minister Siaosi Sovaleni. According to a bloc member, the group's purpose was to help ensure a swift formation of a government, should all affiliated candidates secure a seat. The bloc also aimed to secure the support of some of the nobles' representatives.

Major issues during this election included the wide usage of illicit drugs, government corruption and the COVID-19 pandemic. Many candidates campaigned on their personal records. Prime Minister Tuʻiʻonetoa did not promote his PAK party during the election, which was also completely absent from his campaign platform and speeches. Many of his ministers instead ran as independents. Journalist Kalafi Moala suggested that the PAK's scarce presence during the campaign and its supporters' reluctance to promote it were likely due to the imprisonment of Deputy Leader Lavulavu. Prime Minister Tu‘i‘onetoa and his allies campaigned primarily on infrastructure. Moala believed independent candidates had an overall advantage, citing the PTOA infighting and the PAK's scandals.

== Conduct ==
King Tupou VI issued the election writ on 2 September, while the parliamentary term formally ended on 16 September. Candidate nominations were open from 27 to 28 September, while voter registration closed on 3 November. Shortly before the election, Tongatapu was placed under a week-long lockdown due to a COVID-19 case, with candidates restricted from campaigning on the island. Election Supervisor Pita Vuki, however, announced that the election would not be delayed, stating that the Electoral Act did not permit an election postponement under those circumstances. A campaign blackout occurred on 17 November. On election day, polling stations for the people's seats were open from 9:00 to 16:00, while voting for the nobles' representatives took place in the morning. No overseas delegations were present in Tonga to observe the election, due to the COVID border restrictions. Some foreign diplomats present in the country, however, did oversee the electoral process.

== Results ==
The PTOA received the most votes in a many constituencies; however, due to vote-splitting between the rival factions' candidates, the party only secured three seats. Both faction leaders, Siaosi Pōhiva and Sēmisi Sika, lost their re-election bids. Prime Minister Tuʻiʻonetoa was the only successful candidate from his PAK party, while the other 13 people's seats were won by independent contestants. Nine of the victorious people's candidates and two of the noble MPs were newcomers, while ʻAlipate Tuʻivanuavou Vaea also returned to parliament after losing his seat in 2017. No women were elected, with incumbent MP Losaline Maʻasi losing in Tongatapu 5. Female contestants received an overall lower combined vote share than in 2017. Voter turnout was around 62%, down from 67% in the previous election. The electoral commission conducted recounts in five constituencies, including the prime minister's, which were completed on 29 November. The recounts slightly altered the vote totals, but did not change any of the outcomes in these seats.

Party	Votes	%	Seats	+/–
Democratic Party of the Friendly Islands			3	–11
Tonga People's Party			1	New
Independents			13	+10
Nobles' representatives			9	0
Total			26	–
Total votes	38,550	–		
Registered voters/turnout	62,253	61.92		
Source: Matangi Tonga, Nukuʻalofa Times, Talanoa ʻo Tonga

=== By constituency ===
==== People's seats ====
Tongatapu 1
Candidate	Votes	%
Tēvita Fatafehi Puloka	1,695	58.45
Siaosi Pōhiva	1,114	38.41
Ikani Loneli Taliai	44	1.52
Sione Keuate Tupouniua	34	1.17
Eliesa Fifita	13	0.45
Total	2,900	100.00
Registered voters/turnout	4,681	–

Tongatapu 2
Candidate	Votes	%
ʻUhilamoelangi Fasi	962	48.93
Semisi Sika	796	40.49
Soane Patita Vakautafefine Fifita	208	10.58
Total	1,966	100.00
Registered voters/turnout	3,674	–

Tongatapu 3
Candidate	Votes	%
Siaosi Sovaleni	2,084	83.29
Gabriella Renne Blake ʻIlolahia	376	15.03
Fisiʻipeau Faiva	42	1.68
Total	2,502	100.00
Registered voters/turnout	4,734	–

Tongatapu 4
Candidate	Votes	%
Tatafu Moeaki	1,237	48.08
Mateni Tapueluelu	1,116	43.37
Ilaisi Lelei ʻUfi	220	8.55
Total	2,573	100.00
Registered voters/turnout	4,239	–

Tongatapu 5
Candidate	Votes	%
ʻAisake Eke	958	35.23
Maliu Takai	657	24.16
Losaline Maʻasi	614	22.58
‘Akanete Lauti	490	18.02
Total	2,719	100.00
Registered voters/turnout	4,526	–

Tongatapu 6
Candidate	Votes	%
Poasi Tei	1,771	61.94
Fane Fotu Fituafe	1,088	38.06
Total	2,859	100.00
Registered voters/turnout	4,700	–

Tongatapu 7
Candidate	Votes	%
Sione Sangster Saulala	810	31.75
Feletiliki Teau‘imo‘unga Fa‘otusia	659	25.83
Paula Piveni Piukala	610	23.91
Emaloni Tau‘akiloto Tongi	359	14.07
Mele Teusivi ‘Amanaki	80	3.14
Taniela Vao	33	1.29
Total	2,551	100.00
Registered voters/turnout	4,328	–

Tongatapu 8
Candidate	Votes	%
Semisi Fakahau	1,020	41.45
Johnny Grattan Vaea Taione	746	30.31
Viliami Sisifa	641	26.05
Poasi Fonua	42	1.71
John Alan Ramsay	12	0.49
Total	2,461	100.00
Registered voters/turnout	4,089	–

Tongatapu 9
Candidate	Votes	%
Sevenitini Toumoʻua	828	32.47
Tevita Tukunga	781	30.63
Penisimani Fifita	411	16.12
Vika Vaka Fusimalohi	344	13.49
Timote Tu‘iono ‘Oliveti Laume	130	5.10
Mapa Tautahi ‘Uhila	56	2.20
Total	2,550	100.00
Registered voters/turnout	4,216	–

Tongatapu 10
Candidate	Votes	%
Pohiva Tuʻiʻonetoa	1,303	45.61
Kapelieli Militoni Lanumata	1,086	38.01
Vika Taufa Kaufusi	468	16.38
Total	2,857	100.00
Registered voters/turnout	4,568	–

ʻEua 11
Candidate	Votes	%
Taniela Fusimalohi	1,072	50.05
Tevita Lavemaau	1,059	49.44
Tevita Fakaʻosi	7	0.33
Silivia Loumaile Mahe	4	0.19
Total	2,142	100.00
Registered voters/turnout	3,092	–

Haʻapai 12
Candidate	Votes	%
Viliami Hingano	475	31.39
Moʻale Finau	425	28.09
Sione Finau Tapu	208	13.75
Saimone Kapetaua Vuki	200	13.22
Ana Lautaimi Takai	143	9.45
Sovaleni Maama-Tataki-‘Oe-Fononga Toafa Fifita	62	4.10
Total	1,513	100.00
Registered voters/turnout	2,356	–

Haʻapai 13
Candidate	Votes	%
Veivosa Taka	731	47.84
Viliami Paumolevuka	436	28.53
Milika Fifita Ikahihifo	319	20.88
Pita Halapo‘ulia Mohetau	24	1.57
Taniela ‘Ahokovi Moli	18	1.18
Total	1,528	100.00
Registered voters/turnout	2,340	–

Vavaʻu 14
Candidate	Votes	%
Saia Piukala	1,010	48.30
Tuʻamelie Helotu Kemoeʻatu	405	19.37
Loisi Halaliku	379	18.13
Latu Niua Lepolo	169	8.08
Paula Penisimani Tatafu	128	6.12
Total	2,091	100.00
Registered voters/turnout	3,182	–

Vavaʻu 15
Candidate	Votes	%
Samiu Vaipulu	747	36.47
Keuli Pasina Lavaki	739	36.08
Tomifa Fainga‘a Paea	473	23.10
Katinia Limiteti Taumalolo	47	2.29
Siosiua ‘Umulovo Toki	42	2.05
Total	2,048	100.00
Registered voters/turnout	2,989	–

Vavaʻu 16
Candidate	Votes	%
Viliami Latu	1,047	44.44
Mapa Ha‘ano Jr Taumalolo	509	21.60
Silongoʻatonga Samani	404	17.15
Seli Uatekini Tuʻakalau	396	16.81
Total	2,356	100.00
Registered voters/turnout	3,262	–

Ongo Niua 17
Candidate	Votes	%
Vatau Hui	367	39.29
Sosefo Feʻaomoeata Vakata	285	30.51
Paea-ʻI-Vaha Filimoehala	230	24.63
ʻAisake Hoatatau Finau	52	5.57
Total	934	100.00
Registered voters/turnout	1,277	–

==== Nobles ====
Constituency	Elected	Votes
‘Eua	Lord Nuku	11
Ha‘apai	Lord Tu‘iha‘angana	5
Ha‘apai	Lord Fakafānua	4
Niuas	Prince Fotofili	2
Tongatapu	Lord Vaea	13
Tongatapu	Lord Tuʻivakanō	12
Tongatapu	Lord Fohe	10
Vavaʻu	Lord Tuʻiʻafitu	9
Vavaʻu	Lord Tuʻilakepa	8
Source: Matangi Tonga

== Aftermath ==
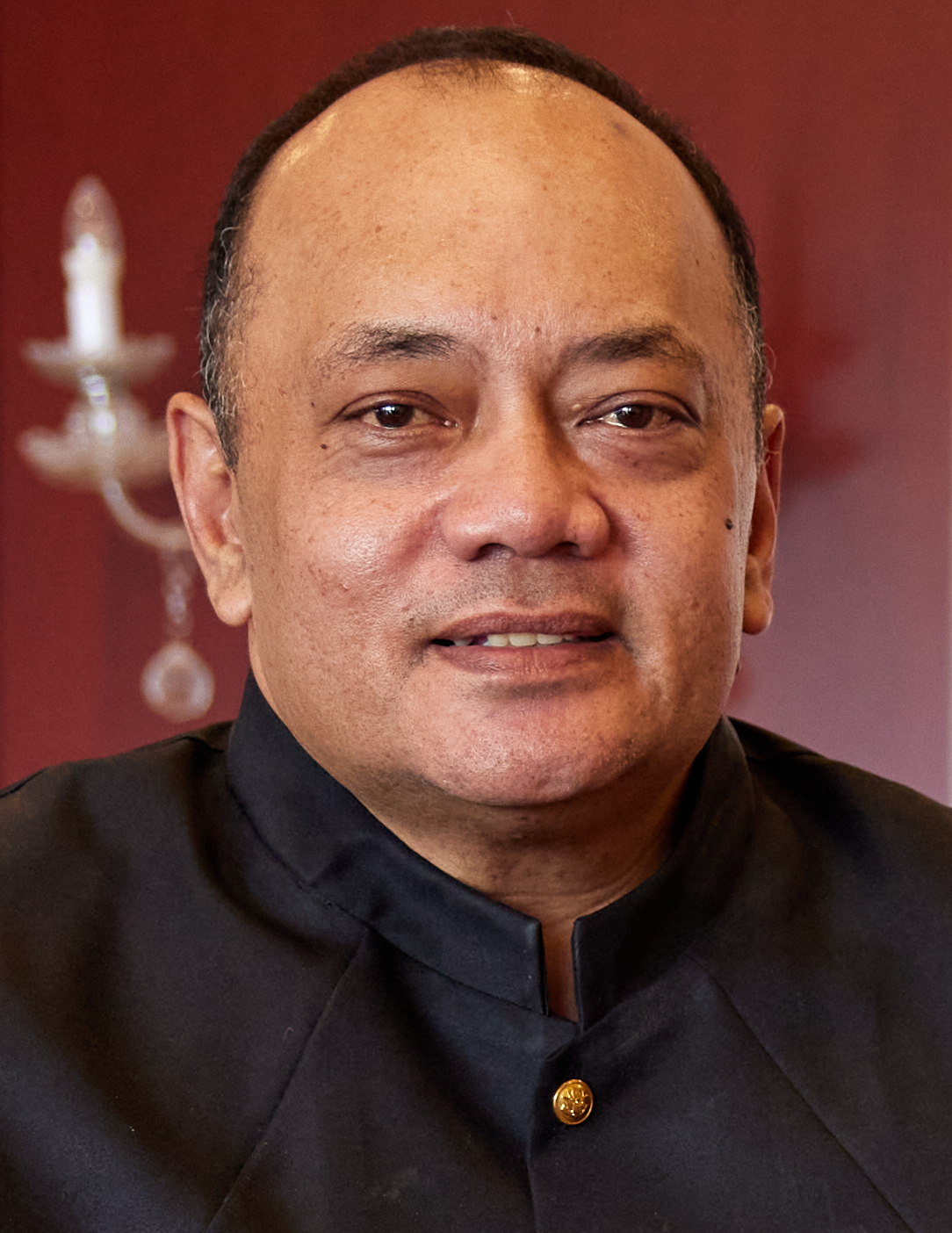
Siaosi Sovaleni was elected prime minister

Following the election, three members of parliament declared their candidacies for the prime ministerial election: Prime Minister Tuʻiʻonetoa, former Deputy Prime Minister Siaosi Sovaleni and former Finance Minister ʻAisake Eke. Tu‘i‘onetoa later withdrew from the race, due to a lack of support in parliament, leaving Sovaleni as the frontrunner. Tuʻiʻonetoa subsequently endorsed Eke. During the parliamentary vote on 15 December, Sovaleni received 16 votes, defeating Eke, who garnered the support of 10 MPs. Fatafehi Fakafānua was re-elected as speaker, as was his deputy, fellow Ha‘apai MP Havea Tuʻihaʻangana. The monarch formally appointed Sovaleni as prime minister on 27 December and unveiled his cabinet two days later. Included among his ministers was one woman, Fekitamoeloa ʻUtoikamanu, who assumed the portfolios of foreign affairs and tourism, and became the sole female member of parliament. Sovaleni also selected one noble MP to serve in cabinet, Tonga Tuʻiʻafitu, who became the minister for lands and natural resources. The monarch formally opened parliament on 11 January 2022.

The election of three cabinet ministers, Deputy Prime Minister Poasi Tei, Finance Minister Tatafu Moeaki and Internal Affairs Minister Sangster Saulala, was voided by the Court of Appeal on 9 August 2022. The rulings followed the lodging of electoral petitions, alleging that the trio had engaged in corrupt practices, including bribery, during the election. The trio were formally unseated the following day, triggering by-elections in their constituencies. Electoral petitions against ʻUhilamoelangi Fasi and Tevita Puloka were unsuccessful. Tuʻiʻonetoa's election was initially voided, but he successfully appealed the ruling and remained in parliament until his death in 2023.
