= Sitiveni Halapua =

Tongan politician (1949–2023)

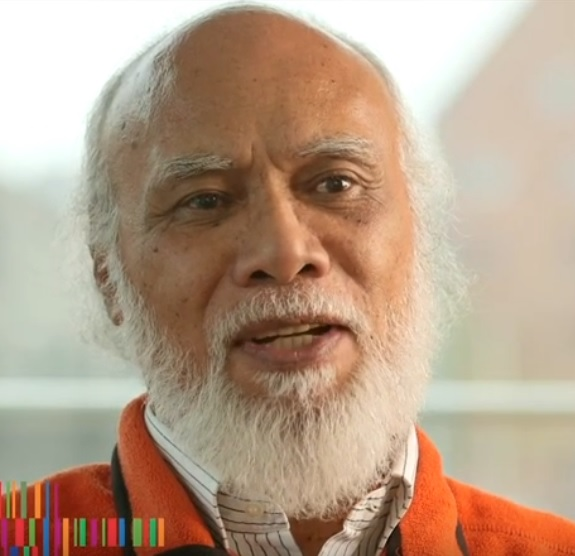
- Halapua in 2013

Member of Parliament for Tongatapu 3
- In office 26 November 2010 – 27 November 2014
- Preceded by: none (constituency established)
- Succeeded by: Siaosi Sovaleni

Personal details
- Born: 13 February 1949
- Died: 29 January 2023 (aged 73)
- Party: Democratic Party of the Friendly Islands

Sitiveni Halapua (13 February 1949 – 29 January 2023) was a Tongan politician and Member of the Tongan Parliament. He was a deputy leader of the Democratic Party of the Friendly Islands.

== Academic career ==
Halapua obtained a PhD in economics from the University of Kent in England. Between 1981 and 1988, he lectured in economics at the University of the South Pacific in Suva, Fiji. He later worked as Director of the Pacific Islands Development Programme at the East-West Center in Hawaii. While working at the East-West Center he developed a conflict-resolution system based on the Polynesian practice of Talanoa, which he has applied in the Cook Islands, Fiji, and Tonga.

In November 2005 he was appointed to the National Committee for Political Reform, which aimed at producing a plan for the democratic reform of Tonga. In October 2006 the Commission recommended a fully elected parliament. He subsequently blamed Prime Minister Feleti Sevele's "hijacking" of the report for the 2006 Nuku'alofa riots.

== Political career ==
Halapua was elected to Parliament at the 2010 elections, as MP for Tongatapu 3. Following the elections, he was suggested as a candidate for Prime Minister.

In July 2014 Halapua was dumped as a Democratic Party candidate. He subsequently announced he would campaign as an independent in the 2014 election, but ultimately chose not to stand. He later contested the 2017 election. He was unsuccessful.
