= Tongatapu 5 =

Electoral constituency in Tonga

- Constituency for the Legislative Assembly of Tonga
- Region: Tongatapu

Current constituency
- Created: 2010
- Number of members: 1
- Party: Independent
- Member(s): ʻAisake Eke

Tongatapu 5 is an electoral constituency for the Legislative Assembly in the Kingdom of Tonga. It was established for the November 2010 general election, when the multi-seat regional constituencies for People's Representatives were replaced by single-seat constituencies, electing one representative via the first past the post electoral system. Located in the central-western part of the country's main island, Tongatapu, it encompasses the villages of Kanokupolu, Haʻatafu, Kolovai, Haʻavakatolo, ʻAhau, Foʻui, Teʻekiu, Masilamea, Nukunuku, Matafonua, Matahau, Vaotuʻu, Fahefa, Kalaʻau, Haʻutu, and ʻAtata.

Its first ever representative in 2010 was ʻAisake Eke, who was not a member of any political party, and was a first time MP. Of Tongatapu's ten constituencies, Tongatapu 5 was the only one not to be won by the Democratic Party of the Friendly Islands, but Eke was viewed as a pro-democracy independent close to the party, and had even considered running as a party member. For the 2014 election, he did exactly that, and retained his seat, this time for the Democratic Party. Eke lost the seat to Losaline Ma'asi in 2017, but regained it at the 2021 election.

== Members of Parliament ==
| Election | Member | Party |
|---|---|---|
| 2010 | ʻAisake Eke | Independent |
| 2014 | ʻAisake Eke | Democratic Party of the Friendly Islands |
| 2017 | Losaline Ma'asi | Democratic Party of the Friendly Islands |
| 2021 | ʻAisake Eke | independent |

== Election results ==
=== 2014 ===
Tongan general election, 2014: Tongatapu 5
| Party | Candidate | Votes | % | ±% |
|---|---|---|---|---|
| DPFI | ʻAisake Eke | 1621 | 57.7 | +33.6 |
| (unknown) | Maliu Moeao Takai | 1076 | 38.3 | +16.4 |
| (unknown) | Lia Manatufa’oa | 71 | 2.5 | n/a |
| (unknown) | Viliami Mangisi | 41 | 1.5 | n/a |
| Turnout | | 2809 | | |
| Majority | | 545 | 19.4 | +17.2 |
| DPFI gain from Independent | | Swing | n/a | |

=== 2010 ===
Tongan general election, 2010: Tongatapu 5
| Party | Candidate | Votes | % | ±% |
|---|---|---|---|---|
| Independent | ʻAisake Eke | 679 | 24.1 | n/a |
| (unknown) | Maliu Moeao Takai | 616 | 21.9 | n/a |
| (unknown) | Siale Napaʻa Fihaki | 302 | 10.7 | n/a |
| (unknown) | Hekisou Fifita | 285 | 10.1 | n/a |
| (unknown) | Sione Loseli | 238 | 8.5 | n/a |
| (unknown) | Semisi Tongia | 233 | 8.3 | n/a |
| (unknown) | Lopeti Senituli | 155 | 5.5 | n/a |
| (unknown) | Sione Tuʻalau Mangisi | 116 | 4.1 | n/a |
| (unknown) | Sione Langi Vailanu | 98 | 3.5 | n/a |
| (unknown) | Sitiveni Takaetali Finau | 46 | 1.6 | n/a |
| (unknown) | ʻOfa Tautuiaki | 24 | 0.9 | n/a |
| (unknown) | Pita Ikataʻane Finaulahi | 19 | 0.7 | n/a |
| (unknown) | Sateki Finau | 4 | 0.1 | n/a |
| Turnout | | 2815 | | |
| Majority | | 63 | 2.2 | n/a |
| Independent win (new seat) | | | | |

== See also ==
- Constituencies of Tonga
