= Sēmisi Sika =

Tongan politician

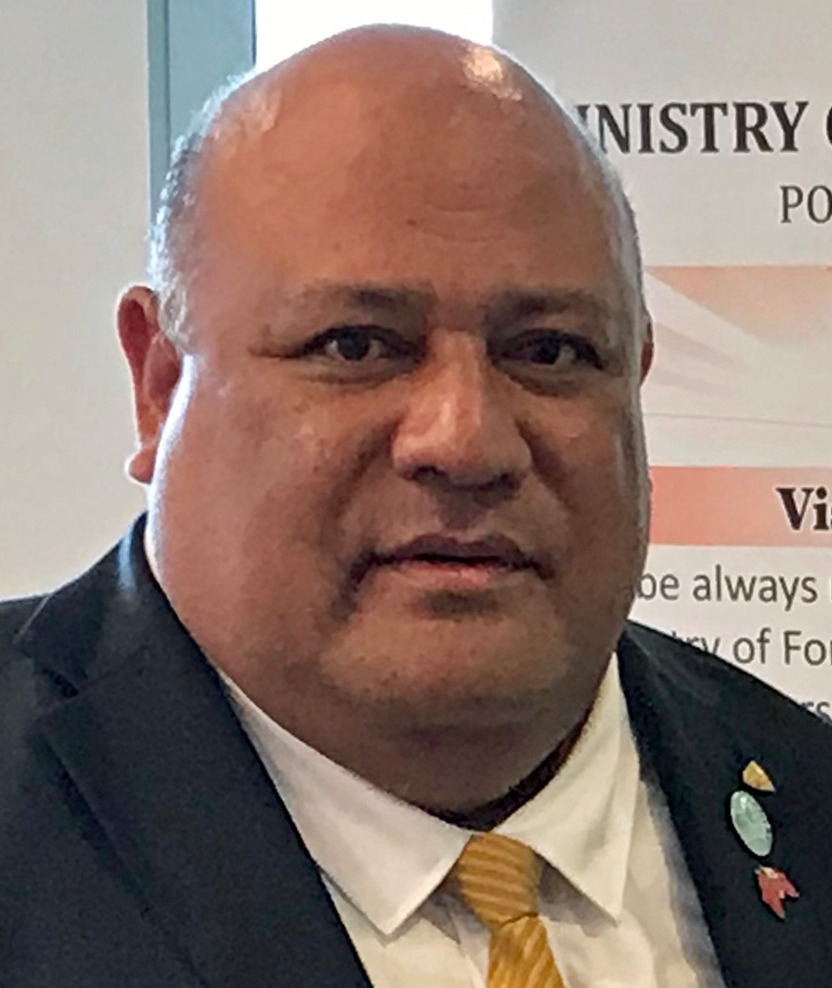
- Sika in May 2019

Acting Prime Minister of Tonga
- In office 12 September 2019 – 8 October 2019
- Monarch: Tupou VI
- Preceded by: ʻAkilisi Pōhiva
- Succeeded by: Pōhiva Tuʻiʻonetoa

Deputy Prime Minister of Tonga
- In office 16 January 2018 – 10 October 2019
- Prime Minister: ʻAkilisi Pōhiva
- Preceded by: Lord Maʻafu
- Succeeded by: Sione Vuna Fa'otusia

Minister of Infrastructure and Tourism
- In office 18 April 2016 – 10 October 2019
- Prime Minister: ʻAkilisi Pōhiva
- Preceded by: ‘Etuate Lavulavu (Infrastructure); Pohiva Tuʻiʻonetoa (Tourism)
- Succeeded by: 'Akosita Lavulavu

Member of the Tongan Parliament for Tongatapu 2
- In office 20 November 2025 – 3 August 2026
- Preceded by: ʻUhilamoelangi Fasi
- In office 26 November 2010 – 18 November 2021
- Preceded by: New constituency
- Succeeded by: ʻUhilamoelangi Fasi

Personal details
- Born: 31 January 1968 (age 58)
- Party: Independent
- Education: Brigham Young University–Hawaii

Sēmisi Kioa Lafu Sika (born 31 January 1968) is a Tongan politician, businessman, and former member of the Tongan Parliament from 2010 to 2021. He served as acting prime minister in September 2019, following the death of ʻAkilisi Pōhiva.

== Career and activism ==
Sika is from Haveluloto, and was educated at Brigham Young University–Hawaii, gaining a Bachelor of Science. Before entering politics he worked as a teacher and travel agent, and ran a takeaway shop and catering firm. He is a longstanding supporter of the democratic movement in Tonga. In 2007 he was one of three people, including Human Rights and Democracy Movement leader ʻAkilisi Pōhiva, who were prosecuted for their leadership of a protest march in June 2006. He was found not guilty and discharged.

== Political career ==
A member of the Democratic Party of the Friendly Islands, Sika was elected to Parliament in the seat of Tongatapu 2 in the 2010 elections. He was re-elected in the 2014 and became Chairman of the Committee of the Whole House. In April 2016 he was appointed Minister of Tourism and Infrastructure.

Following the 2017 election Sika was appointed Deputy Prime Minister. in July 2019 there were calls for his resignation after he intervened to silence a speech against bullying and sexism at the Miss Pacific pageant in Tonga.

He became acting premier following the death of Prime Minister ʻAkilisi Pōhiva on 12 September 2019. He contested the Premiership, but was defeated by Pōhiva Tuʻiʻonetoa by eight votes to fifteen. Sika led the PTOA.

In December 2020 he submitted a motion of no-confidence in Prime Minister Tuʻiʻonetoa.

He contested the 2021 Tongan general election, but was unsuccessful.

During the 2025 general election, Sika recaptured the Tongatapu 2 seat, receiving 55% of the vote. He defeated the incumbent representative, Education Minister ʻUhilamoelangi Fasi, who garnered 44%. The election produced a parliament composed entirely of independents, with the PTOA failing to capture any seats for the first time since its foundation. Sika endorsed incumbent ʻAisake Eke for another term in the prime ministerial vote in parliament, held on 15 December. Eke, however, went on to lose to Fatafehi Fakafānua. Despite not supporting him, Fakafānua appointed Sika to his cabinet, assigning him the infrastructure and tourism portfolios. Sika was sworn in on 6 January 2026, along with most of the new cabinet.

Fasi filed a lawsuit after the election, alleging that Sika had exceeded the 20,000 paʻanga campaign spending limit in breach of the Electoral Act. The Supreme Court found him guilty on 8 May. Sika said he did not expect the conviction, but that he would respect the ruling. Sika appealed the case; however, the Court of Appeal upheld the ruling, triggering a by-election in Tongatapu 2. Sika resigned from cabinet on 27 July, and he was formally unseated from parliament on 3 August.

Legislative Assembly of Tonga
Constituency Established	Member of Parliament for Tongatapu 2; 2010–2021	Succeeded by ʻUhilamoelangi Fasi
Preceded by ʻUhilamoelangi Fasi	Member of Parliament for Tongatapu 2; 2025–2026	Vacant
Political offices
Preceded by ‘Etuate Lavulavu (Infrastructure); Pōhiva Tuʻiʻonetoa (Tourism)	Minister of Infrastructure and Tourism; 2016–2019	Succeeded by 'Akosita Lavulavu
Preceded by Lord Maʻafu	Deputy Prime Minister of Tonga; 2018–2019	Succeeded by Sione Vuna Faʻotusia
Preceded by ʻAkilisi Pōhiva	Acting Prime Minister of Tonga; 2019	Succeeded by Pōhiva Tuʻiʻonetoa
