= ʻEua 11 =

Electoral constituency in Tonga

- Constituency for the Legislative Assembly of Tonga

Current constituency
- Created: 2010
- Number of members: 1
- Party: Independent
- Member: Taniela Fusimalohi

ʻEua 11 is an electoral constituency for the Legislative Assembly in the Kingdom of Tonga. It was established for the November 2010 general election, when the multi-seat regional constituencies for People's Representatives were replaced by single-seat constituencies, electing one representative via the first past the post electoral system. It covers the whole of the island of ʻEua, and the much smaller adjacent island of Kalau. Despite the "11" in its name, there is only one constituency for ʻEua; each constituency in the country is given a number.

Its first ever representative was Sunia Fili, who had first been elected to Parliament in 1999. Elected as an independent MP in 2010, he was appointed Minister for Finance by Prime Minister Lord Tuʻivakano. Though elected as an independent, he was close to the Democratic Party of the Friendly Islands, and joined it in 2012 after resigning from the government.

Fili was replaced by Tevita Lavemaau at the 2014 election. Lavemaau was re-elected in 2017, but lost the seat at the 2021 election to Taniela Fusimalohi.

== Members of Parliament ==
Election or event	Member	Party
2010	Sunia Fili	Independent
2012	Sunia Fili	Democratic Party of the Friendly Islands
2014	Tevita Lavemaau	Independent
2017	Tevita Lavemaau	Independent
2021	Taniela Fusimalohi	Independent

== Election results ==
=== 2010 ===
Tongan general election, 2010: ʻEua 11
Party	Candidate	Votes	%	±%
Independent	Sunia Fili	772	37.2	
(unknown)	Sione Sengililala Moala	667	32.1	
(unknown)	Tevita Lavemaau	637	30.7	
Majority		105	5.1	n/a
Independent win (new seat)				

=== 2014 ===
Along with five other incumbent DPFI MPs, Sunia Fili was not selected as a DPFI candidate for this election, and announced he would be running as an independent candidate.

'Eua 11
Candidate	Votes	%
Tevita Lavemaau	760	
Sunia Fili	716	
Taniela Fusimalohi	618	
Suliasi Pouvalu Fonise 'Aholelei	57	
Silivia Loumaile Mahe	7	
Invalid/blank votes	1	–
Total	2,159	100
Registered voters/turnout		
Source: TEC

=== 2017 ===
'Eua 11
Candidate	Votes	%
Tevita Lavemaau	789	
Taniela Fusimalohi	519	
Sunia Manu Fili	476	
Sunia Kauvaka Havea	310	
Hale Telepo	6	
Silivia Loumaile Mahe	6	
Invalid/blank votes	2	–
Total	2,108	100
Registered voters/turnout		
Source: Tonga Elections

== See also ==
- Constituencies of Tonga
