= Siaosi Sovaleni =

Prime Minister of Tonga from 2021 to 2024

The Honourable Siaosi Sovaleni
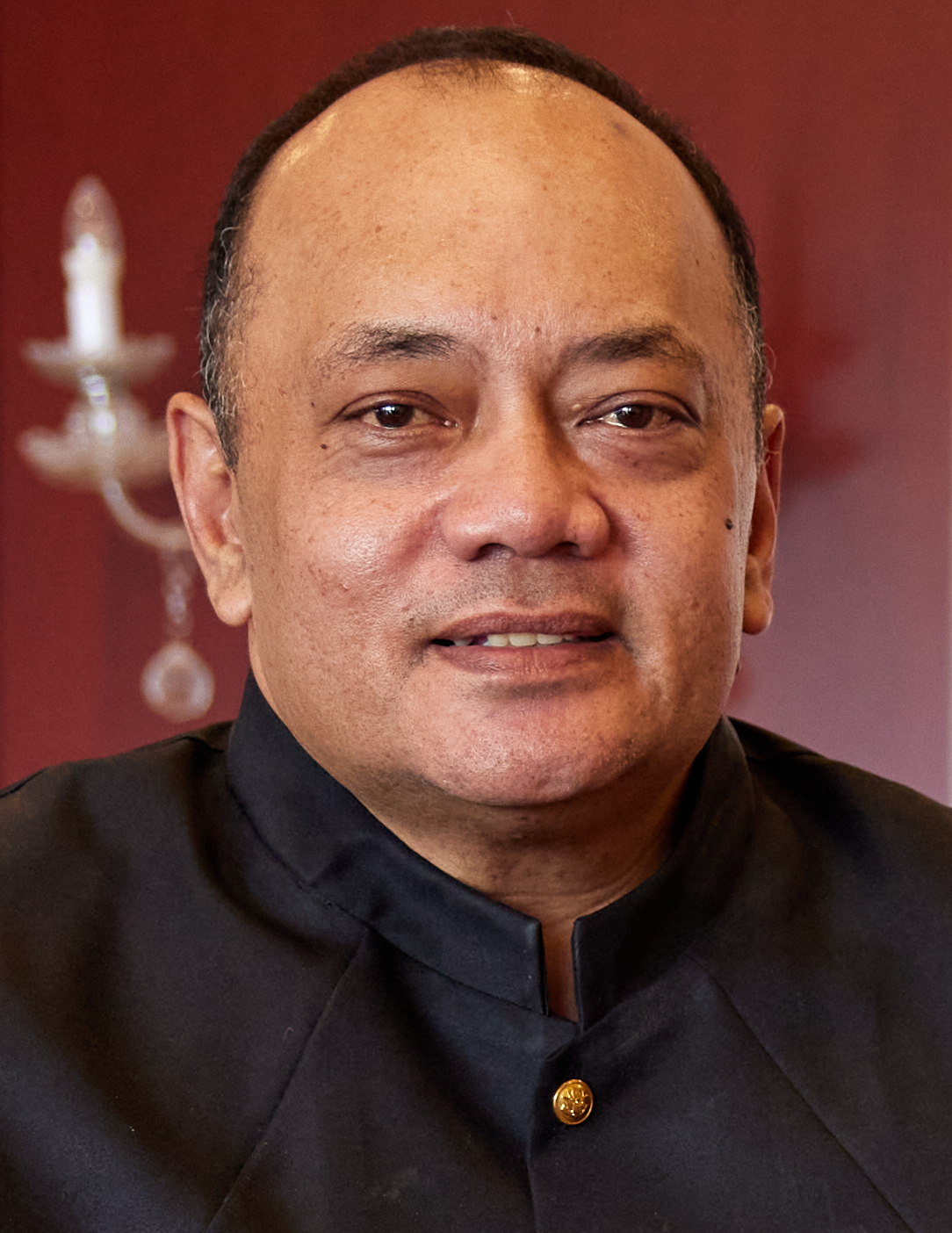
- Sovaleni in 2022

Prime Minister of Tonga
- In office 27 December 2021 – 9 December 2024
- Monarch: Tupou VI
- Deputy: Poasi Tei
- Preceded by: Pōhiva Tuʻiʻonetoa
- Succeeded by: Samiu Vaipulu (acting)

Minister of Education and Training
- In office 10 October 2019 – 28 January 2025
- Prime Minister: Pōhiva Tuʻiʻonetoa; Himself
- Preceded by: Penisimani Fifita
- Succeeded by: ʻUhilamoelangi Fasi

Minister for Police, Fire & Emergency Services
- In office 28 December 2021 – 28 January 2025
- Prime Minister: Himself
- Preceded by: Lord Nuku
- Succeeded by: Paula Piukala

Minister for His Majesty's Armed Forces
- In office 28 December 2021 – 28 March 2024
- Preceded by: Lord Maʻafu
- Succeeded by: Tupoutoʻa ʻUlukalala
Other offices held
Deputy Prime Minister of Tonga
In office 30 December 2014 – 6 September 2017
Prime Minister	ʻAkilisi Pōhiva
Preceded by	Samiu Vaipulu
Succeeded by	Lord Maʻafu
Minister for Environment and Communication
In office 30 December 2014 – 6 September 2017
Preceded by	Lord Maʻafu
Succeeded by	Poasi Tei

Member of the Tongan Parliament for Tongatapu 3
- Incumbent
- Assumed office 27 November 2014
- Preceded by: Sitiveni Halapua

Personal details
- Born: Siaosi ‘Ofakivahafolau Sovaleni; 28 February 1970 (age 56)
- Party: Independent
- Education: University of Auckland (BS); University of Oxford (MS); University of the South Pacific (MBA)

Siaosi 'Ofakivahafolau Sovaleni (born 28 February 1970), styled Hon. Hu‘akavameiliku, is a Tongan politician who served as the prime minister of Tonga from 2021 until his resignation in 2024. He had previously served as a cabinet minister, and from 2014 to 2017, he was deputy prime minister of Tonga. He is the current estate holder of the village of Ha'asini.

== Early life ==
Sovaleni is the son of former Deputy Prime Minister Langi Kavaliku. He attended Timaru Boys' High School in New Zealand and graduated in 1988. He was educated at the University of Auckland in New Zealand, graduating with a Bachelor of Science in computer science in 1992. He subsequently completed a master's degree at the University of Oxford, and an MBA at the University of the South Pacific in Suva, Fiji. He worked as a public servant for Tonga's Ministry of Finance from 1996 to 2010, before working for the Pacific Community and Asian Development Bank. He returned to Tonga in 2013 to work as the Chief Executive in the Ministry of Public Enterprises.

== Political career ==
Sovaleni was first elected to the Legislative Assembly of Tonga at the 2014 Tongan general election, and appointed Deputy Prime Minister and Minister of Environment and Communications in the Cabinet of ʻAkilisi Pōhiva. As Communications Minister, he pushed through two bills allowing for internet censorship in 2015.

In September 2017, he was sacked for disloyalty for supporting King Tupou VI's decision to sack the Prime Minister, dissolve Parliament and call new elections. He ran in the 2017 Tongan general election and was re-elected as the only non-DPFI MP on Tongatapu. He subsequently contested the premiership with Pohiva, but was defeated by 12 votes to 14.

Following the death of ʻAkilisi Pōhiva, Sovaleni supported Pōhiva Tuʻiʻonetoa for prime minister. He was appointed to Tuʻiʻonetoa's Cabinet as Minister for Education and Training.

In January 2021, he was bestowed with the chiefly title of Hu’akavameiliku, which had also been held by his father.

He was re-elected in the 2021 election while receiving the highest number of votes of all candidates for any seat.

== Prime minister (2021–2024) ==
In post-election negotiations he emerged as one of the two chief contenders for the premiership, along with ʻAisake Eke. On 15 December 2021, he was elected prime minister, defeating Eke with 16 votes. Eke has stated that he will contest the election results in court. He was formally appointed prime minister on 27 December. He named his Cabinet on 29 December 2021, retaining the Education portfolio and in addition taking responsibility for Police and the Armed Forces.

On 12 March 2022 he tested positive for COVID-19.

On 2 February 2024 while Sovaleni was in New Zealand for medical treatment the king purported to revoke his appointment as armed forces minister, as well as that of foreign affairs minister Fekitamoeloa ʻUtoikamanu. Attorney-General Linda Folaumoetu'i advised the Cabinet that the decision was unconstitutional.

On 4 April 2024 Sovaleni announced that he had resigned as Armed Forces Minister while ʻUtoikamanu also resigned from the Cabinet, effective from 28 March. These were seen as a consequence to the King withdrawing his confidence in the two.

Sovaleni resigned in December 2024, pre-empting a no-confidence vote in parliament.

He was re-elected at the 2025 election.

Legislative Assembly of Tonga
Preceded by Sitiveni Halapua	Member of Parliament for Tongatapu 3; 2014–present	Incumbent
Political offices
Preceded by Samiu Vaipulu	Deputy Prime Minister of Tonga; 2014–2017	Succeeded by Lord Maʻafu
Preceded by Lord Maʻafu	Minister of Environment and Communication; 2014–2017	Succeeded by Poasi Tei
Preceded by ʻAkilisi Pōhiva	Minister of Foreign Affairs; 2017–2018	Succeeded by ʻAkilisi Pōhiva
Preceded by Penisimani Fifita	Minister of Education and Training; 2019–2025	Succeeded by ʻUhilamoelangi Fasi
Preceded by Pōhiva Tuʻiʻonetoa	Prime Minister of Tonga; 2021–2024	Succeeded by Samiu Vaipulu as Acting prime minister
