= Tongatapu 10 =

Electoral constituency in Tonga

- Constituency for the Legislative Assembly of Tonga
- Region: Tongatapu

Current constituency
- Created: 2010
- Number of members: 1
- Member(s): Vacant

Tongatapu 10 is an electoral constituency for the Legislative Assembly in the Kingdom of Tonga. It was established for the November 2010 general election, when the multi-seat regional constituencies for People's Representatives were replaced by single-seat constituencies, electing one representative via the first past the post electoral system. Located on the country's main island, Tongatapu, it encompasses the villages of Lapaha, Talasiu, Hoi, Nukuleka, Makaunga, Talafo‘ou, Navutoka, Manuka, Kolonga, Afa, Niutoua, and ‘Eueiki.

Its first ever representative was Semisi Tapueluelu, a first time MP, representing the Democratic Party of the Friendly Islands. He lost the seat to Pōhiva Tuʻiʻonetoa at the 2014 election. Tuʻiʻonetoa would represent this constituency until April 2022, when he was stripped of the seat by the Supreme Court for bribery.

== Members of Parliament ==
Election	Member	Party
2010	Semisi Tapueluelu	Democratic Party of the Friendly Islands
2014	Pōhiva Tuʻiʻonetoa	Independent
2017	Pōhiva Tuʻiʻonetoa	Independent
2021	Pōhiva Tuʻiʻonetoa	Tonga People's Party

== Election results ==
=== 2010 ===
Tongan general election, 2010: Tongatapu 10
Party	Candidate	Votes	%	±%
DPFI	Semisi Palu ‘Ifoni Tapueluelu	792	26.6	
(unknown)	Pohiva Tuʻiʻonetoa	613	20.6	
(unknown)	Faka’osilea Kaufusi	608	20.5	
(unknown)	Faka’osi ‘Akapulu Maama	277	9.3	
(unknown)	Semisi Kaifoto Pale	170	5.7	
(unknown)	Daniel Kimball Fale	109	3.7	
(unknown)	Ongosia ‘Uhatafe	104	3.5	
(unknown)	Soane Vaka’uta Melekiola	77	2.6	
(unknown)	Fifita Sili	71	2.4	
(unknown)	Latanoa Pikula	64	2.2	
(unknown)	Kitione Pomaama	61	2.1	
(unknown)	Malia Peata Sioko Noa	27	0.9	
Majority		179	6	n/a
DPFI win (new seat)				

=== 2014 ===
Along with five other incumbent DPFI MPs, Semisi Tapueluelu was not selected as a DPFI candidate for this election, and announced he would be running as an independent candidate.

Tongan general election, 2014: Tongatapu 10
Party	Candidate	Votes	%	±%
(unknown)				
Turnout				

== See also ==
- Constituencies of Tonga
