= Taniela Fusimalohi =

Tongan politician and civil servant

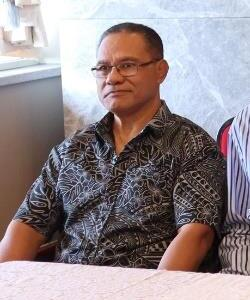
- Fusimalohi in 2023

Deputy Prime Minister of Tonga
- In office 28 January 2025 – 18 December 2025
- Prime Minister: ʻAisake Eke
- Preceded by: Samiu Vaipulu
- Succeeded by: Viliami Latu

Minister for Energy, Environment, Information and Climate Change
- Incumbent
- Assumed office 28 January 2025

Minister for Infrastructure
- Incumbent
- Assumed office 28 January 2025

Member of Parliament for ʻEua 11
- Incumbent
- Assumed office 18 November 2021
- Preceded by: Tevita Lavemaau

Taniela Likuʻohihifo Fusimalohi is a Tongan politician, civil servant, and Cabinet Minister.

Fusimalohi was educated at the University of South Australia, graduated with a Bachelor of Business Studies. After completing a postgraduate diploma at the University of Manchester in the United Kingdom, he returned to the University of South Australia to complete a Master of Arts. In 2005 he completed a PhD at the University of Queensland on the topic of Culture-bound public administration : the value basis of public administration in Tonga.

From 1987 Fusimalohi worked as a civil servant, starting as a Senior Executive Officer in the Prime Minister's Office and rising to be a Principal Assistant Secretary. In 2000 he was appointed Deputy Director of the Tonga Visitors Bureau. From 2007 to 2012 he served as Chief Executive of the Ministry of Training, Employment, Youth and Sports. In 2020 he was appointed as a Part Time Commissioner of the Public Service Commission.

He was elected to the seat of ʻEua 11 in the 2021 Tongan general election. On 28 January 2025 he was appointed to the cabinet of ʻAisake Eke as Deputy Prime Minister, Minister for Meteorology, Energy, Information, Disaster Management, Environment, Communications and Climate Change, and Minister for Infrastructure .

He was re-elected at the 2025 election.
