= Pōhiva Tuʻiʻonetoa =

Prime Minister of Tonga from 2019 to 2021

The Honourable Pōhiva Tuʻiʻonetoa
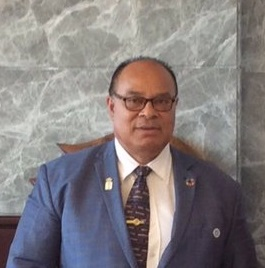
- Tuʻiʻonetoa in 2020

Prime Minister of Tonga
- In office 8 October 2019 – 27 December 2021
- Monarch: Tupou VI
- Deputy: Sēmisi Sika; Sione Vuna Faʻotusia; Lord Maʻafu
- Preceded by: Sēmisi Sika (acting)
- Succeeded by: Siaosi Sovaleni

Leader of the Tonga People's Party
- In office 20 September 2019 – 18 March 2023
- Preceded by: Party established
Other offices held
Minister for Public Enterprises
In office 10 October 2019 – 28 December 2021
| Prime Minister | Himself |
| Succeeded by | Poasi Tei |
Minister of Finance
In office 4 January 2018 – 10 October 2019
| Prime Minister | ʻAkilisi Pōhiva |
| Preceded by | Tevita Lavemaau |
| Succeeded by | Tevita Lavemaau |
Minister of Labour, Commerce and Industries
In office 30 December 2014 – 4 January 2018
| Succeeded by | Tevita Tu'i Uata |
Minister for Revenue and Customs
In office 6 March 2017 – September 2017
| Preceded by | Tevita Lavemaau |
| Succeeded by | Mateni Tapueluelu |
Minister for Police, Prisons and Fire Services
In office 30 December 2014 – 6 March 2017
| Succeeded by | Mateni Tapueluelu |

Member of the Tongan Parliament for Tongatapu 10
- In office 27 November 2014 – 18 March 2023
- Preceded by: Semisi Tapueluelu
- Succeeded by: Kapelieli Lanumata

Personal details
- Born: 30 June 1951 Talafo’ou, Tonga
- Died: 18 March 2023 (aged 71) United States
- Party: Tonga People's Party
- Spouse: Hena Tuʻiʻonetoa
- Education: Monash University; Institute of Certified Management Accountants

Pōhiva Tu’i’onetoa (30 June 1951 – 18 March 2023) was a Tongan accountant and politician who served as the prime minister of Tonga from 2019 to 2021. Tu'i'onetoa succeeded Semisi Sika, who had served as acting prime minister, since the death of ʻAkilisi Pōhiva.

== Early life and education ==
Born in Talafo’ou on 30 June 1951, Tu’i’onetoa graduated from Institute of Chartered Accountants of New Zealand in 1982, and then the Monash University in 1993. He had a diploma in financial management and a master of business degree. He was also a certified management accountant.

== Career ==
Tu’i’onetoa joined the Tonga Civil Service in January 1979. He was the Official Liquidator of the Commercial Division of the Department of Justice in Hamilton, New Zealand. Between 1983 and 2014 he served as Tonga's Auditor. He was a Private Secretary to King Tāufaʻāhau Tupou IV from 1987–1988, and also clerk to the Privy Council during the same period. He ran unsuccessfully for parliament in the 2010 Tongan general election.

In the 2014 general election, he was elected to the Legislative Assembly of Tonga to represent the constituency of Tongatapu 10. In the government of ʻAkilisi Pōhiva, he was Minister of Labor, Commerce and Industries, and Minister of Police, Prisons and Fire Services. In March 2017 he was appointed Minister of Revenue and Customs, replacing Tevita Lavemaau. He held that position until January 2018, when he was appointed Minister of Finance and National Planning.

== Prime Minister of Tonga (2019–2021) ==
On 27 September 2019, Tu’i’onetoa was elected prime minister by fifteen votes against eight for Semisi Sika, who served as acting prime minister. It was officially announced by King Tupou VI on 9 October 2019. He announced his Cabinet appointments on 10 October.

On 12 January 2021, Tu'i'onetoa survived a confidence vote in Parliament, by 13 votes to 9.

Tuʻiʻonetoa was re-elected to parliament in the 2021 election, and announced his candidacy for re-election as prime minister, but later withdrew as a contender to back ʻAisake Eke. He was succeeded as prime minister by Siaosi Sovaleni.

On 29 April 2022, the Supreme Court of Tonga declared his election void after finding he had bribed a women's group by offering them 50,000 Pa'anga. The conviction was stayed pending appeal on 26 May 2022. On 9 June 2022 he was again found to have committed bribery in a second election petition. On 9 August 2022 the Court of Appeal overturned both petitions.

== Personal life and death ==
Tuʻiʻonetoa died on 18 March 2023 in the United States, at the age of 71 while visiting the country for medical reasons.

== Honours ==
National honours;

- Order of Queen Sālote Tupou III, Commander (31 July 2008).

Legislative Assembly of Tonga
| Preceded by Semisi Tapueluelu | Member of Parliament for Tongatapu 10; 2014–2023 | Succeeded by Kapelieli Militoni Lanumata |
Political offices
| Preceded by Tevita Lavemaau | Minister for Revenue and Customs; 2017 | Succeeded by Mateni Tapueluelu |
| Preceded by Tevita Lavemaau | Minister of Finance; 2018–2019 | Succeeded by Tevita Lavemaau |
| Preceded by Sēmisi Sika (Acting) | Prime Minister of Tonga; 2019–2021 | Succeeded by Siaosi Sovaleni |
| Preceded by Sēmisi Sika (Acting) | Minister of Foreign Affairs; 2019–2021 | Succeeded by Fekitamoeloa ʻUtoikamanu |
Party political offices
| New political party | Leader of the Tonga People's Party; 2019–2023 | Vacant |
