= ʻAisake Eke =

Prime Minister of Tonga in 2025

The Honourable ʻAisake Eke
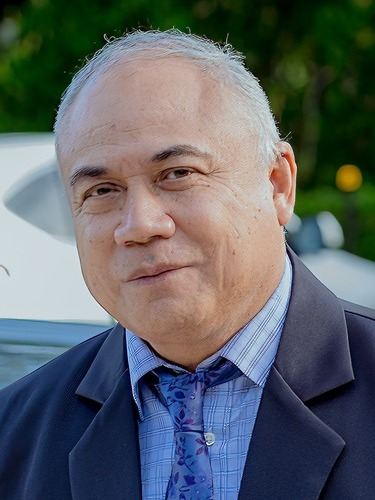
- Eke in 2025

Prime Minister of Tonga
- In office 22 January 2025 – 18 December 2025
- Monarch: Tupou VI
- Deputy: Taniela Fusimalohi
- Preceded by: Samiu Vaipulu (acting)
- Succeeded by: Fatafehi Fakafānua
Other offices held
Minister of Finance and National Planning
In office 28 January 2025 – 18 December 2025
Preceded by	Tiofilusi Tiueti
Succeeded by	Lataifaingataʻa Tangimana
In office 13 January 2014 – 6 March 2017
Prime Minister	Lord Tuʻivakano ʻAkilisi Pohiva
Preceded by	Lisiate ‘Akolo
Succeeded by	Tevita Lavemaau
Minister for Fisheries
In office 28 January 2025 – 18 December 2025
Minister for Prisons
In office 28 January 2025 – 18 December 2025
Preceded by	Samiu Vaipulu
Succeeded by

Member of the Tongan Parliament for Tongatapu 5
- Incumbent
- Assumed office 18 November 2021
- Preceded by: Losaline Maʻasi
- In office 25 November 2010 – 16 November 2017
- Preceded by: New constituency
- Succeeded by: Losaline Maʻasi
- Majority: 2.2%

Personal details
- Born: Tonga
- Party: Independent

ʻAisake Valu Eke is a Tongan politician who served as prime minister of Tonga from January to December 2025. He also served in the Cabinet as Minister for Finance and National Planning from 2014 to 2017.

== Education ==
Eke received a degree in economics during the 1980s at the University of the South Pacific. He undertook his doctorate at the University of Southern Queensland in Australia, where he was awarded a Doctor of Business Administration for his thesis "An exploratory study on the quality of service in the public sector in Tonga" completed in 2013.

== Member of Parliament ==
A former Secretary for Finance at the Ministry of Finance, he was first elected to the Legislative Assembly at the November 2010 general election as MP for Tongatapu 5. Though close to the Democratic Party of the Friendly Islands, and despite having considered running as a party member, he stood as an independent, taking the seat with 24.1% of the vote and a 63-vote margin; Tongatapu 5 was thus the only constituency on Tongatapu not to be won by the party.

Once elected, he told the press there was much to be done to improve the economy, and said the government should facilitate private sector activity.

In October 2011, he was one of several MPs to protest against Parliament voting large allowances to any of its members on sick leave overseas. Stating that MPs should not be spending more public money on themselves at a time when the economy was weak, he was one of eight MPs to vote against the increased allowances (along with ʻAkilisi Pohiva, Semisi Sika, Sitiveni Halapua, Sangster Saulala, Sione Taione, Falisi Tupou and Moʻale Finau, all members of the Democratic Party). The motion was adopted by twelve votes to eight.

== Finance Minister ==
In January 2014, Prime Minister Lord Tuʻivakano appointed him Minister of Finance, following the sacking of Lisiate ‘Akolo over a disagreement concerning the budget. He subsequently kept that position in Prime Minister ʻAkilisi Pohiva's government. In March 2017, however, he abstained during a parliamentary vote on a motion of no confidence against the government he was part of, and was compelled to resign. He subsequently lost his seat at the 2017 election.

He was re-elected in the seat of Tongatapu 5 in the 2021 election. In the aftermath of the election he was one of three candidates for Prime Minister, but was ultimately defeated by Siaosi Sovaleni, who won the Premiership with 16 votes. In May 2022 he was absolved of bribery by the Supreme Court. Following the 2025 election, he was replaced by Lataifaingataʻa Tangimana.

== Prime Minister (2025) ==
On 24 December 2024, Eke was elected prime minister by the Legislative Assembly of Tonga, defeating Viliami Latu by 16 votes to eight. King Tupou VI formally appointed Eke as prime minister on 22 January 2025. His cabinet was announced on 28 January and included four appointees to parliament, two of whom were women. The cabinet also included one noble, Crown Prince Tupoutoʻa ʻUlukalala, who became foreign minister.

In February 2025 Eke announced that the previous government's decision to privatise Vavaʻu International Airport would be reversed.

Eke was re-elected at the 2025 election, and ran in the subsequent parliamentary election for prime minister, held on 15 December. He received 10 votes and was defeated by the parliamentary speaker, Fatafehi Fakafānua, who received 16. Fakafānua succeeded Eke on 18 December.

== Honours ==
- Order of Queen Sālote Tupou III, Commander (31 July 2008).

Legislative Assembly of Tonga
New constituency	Member of Parliament for Tongatapu 5; 2010–2017	Succeeded by Losaline Maʻasi
Preceded by Losaline Maʻasi	Member of Parliament for Tongatapu 5; 2021–present	Incumbent
Political offices
Preceded by Lisiate ‘Akolo	Minister of Finance and National Planning; 2014–2017	Succeeded by Tevita Lavemaau
Preceded by Samiu Vaipulu as Acting prime minister	Prime Minister of Tonga; 2025	Succeeded by Fatafehi Fakafānua
Preceded by Tiofilusi Tiueti	Minister of Finance and National Planning; 2025	Succeeded by Lataifaingataʻa Tangimana
