= Tongan nationality law =

Tongan Nationality Act

Parliament of Tonga
- Long title: An Act Relating to Tongan Nationality and Nationalization
- Enacted by: Government of Tonga
- Status: Current legislation

Tongan nationality law is regulated by the 1875 Constitution of Tonga, as amended; the Nationality Act, and its revisions; and international agreements entered into by the government of Tonga. These laws determine who is, or is eligible to be, a national of Tonga. The legal means to acquire nationality, formal legal membership in a nation, differ from the domestic relationship of rights and obligations between a national and the nation, known as citizenship. Tongan nationality is typically obtained either on the principle of jus soli, i.e. by birth in Tonga or under the rules of jus sanguinis, i.e. by birth abroad to parents with Tongan nationality. It can be granted to persons who have lived in the country for a specific period of time, or who have an affiliation to the country through naturalisation.

== Acquiring Tongan nationality ==
Nationality in Tonga is acquired at birth or later in life by naturalisation.

=== By birth ===
Birthright nationality applies to:

- Persons born anywhere to at least one parent with Tongan nationality, if the parent was born in Tonga.

=== By naturalisation ===
Regular naturalisation in Tonga is acquired by application solely at the discretion of the monarch. Applicants must provide evidence that they are of good character; have familiarity with the Tongan language; intend to live there, and have resided within the territory for five years. Persons who may attain nationality by naturalisation include:

- Persons married to Tongan nationals, subject to taking an oath of allegiance;
- Women who formerly lost their nationality because of marriage, if the marriage has terminated may reacquire nationality without a residency period;
- Minor adoptees and foundlings, upon completion of an adoptive order;
- Minor children of a naturalised subject; or
- Persons who are deemed to have humanitarian need for nationality.

== Loss of nationality ==
Tongan nationals may not renounce their nationality. Denaturalisation may occur if a person obtained nationality through fraud, false representation, or concealment; if they have committed disloyal or treasonous acts, posing a threat to national security; or if they have committed certain criminal offences.

== Dual nationality ==
Since 2007, Tonga has allowed dual nationality. In February 2008, two former Tongan citizens who had lost their Tongan nationality by obtaining the nationality of other countries (one had become an American, the other an Australian) were the first to re-obtain Tongan nationality through application on the basis of the 2007 Nationality (Amendment) Act. Re-obtaining citizenship in this way entails submitting an application to the King, having this application reviewed by the Minister for Immigration, and swearing an oath of allegiance.

== History ==
=== 18th–19th centuries ===
Traditional governance in Tonga was without central authority and local chiefs governed districts and kinship networks. By the 1780s civil war had erupted between various chiefs. In 1820, Tāufaʻāhau began a quest to unite the islands of Tonga under his authority. He took over the disputed area of the Haʻapai islands in 1826, and then secured the Vavaʻu island group in 1833. Launching missionary groups in the 1830s, Tāufaʻāhau used both evangelicalism and conquest to secure allegiance. In 1845, he captured the inheritance of Tongatapu and declared himself King George Tupou I. He completed his unification of the islands in 1852. Working with English Methodist missionaries, Tupou established a governance system based upon the British model to insure that Western Powers would recognise the legitimacy of Tongan sovereignty. In 1839 and 1850, Tupou promulgated written legal codes to establish courts and criminal law and define family relationships, chiefly authority, land use, and religious observances. In 1875, the first constitution was promulgated, which named but did not define native-born subjects and established that foreigners could naturalise. Naturalisation required five years residence and the authorisation of the king.

The latter years of the nineteenth century were characterised by imperialistic ambitions of European powers. In an effort to remain independent, Tupou signed treaties with the French in 1855 and Germany in 1876. To appease security concerns of Australia and New Zealand, in 1879 a Treaty of Friendship was entered into with Britain and in 1886, Tonga signed a similar agreement with the United States. In 1900, Tonga officially became a British Protected State, when a Treaty of Friendship and Protection was signed 18 May. Under this arrangement, Britain did not control the internal affairs of Tonga, nor was its sovereignty compromised, but Britain assisted with its international affairs. As such, British nationality law was applicable for subjects born in Tonga to British fathers. Tonga's treaty history insured that it remained uncolonised.

=== 20th century ===
Tonga's first Nationality Act was drafted in 1915 and was amended in 1935, 1959, 1961, and 1961. It provided that legitimate children born anywhere could acquire nationality through their fathers, but only illegitimate children could derive nationality from their mother. However, if the illegitimate child was born abroad and the father, who was born in Tonga, acknowledged or legitimated it, the child could derive Tongan nationality. If a male subject lost his Tongan nationality, his minor children also lost their nationality, but upon reaching the age of sixteen could declare that they wanted to be Tongan, if they had no other nationality. Foreign women who married Tongan men derived their nationality from their spouse and native-born women who married foreigners lost their nationality upon marriage. The law did not allow Tongan women who married foreign men to pass their nationality to their husbands. In 1959, married women were allowed to choose whether they wished to acquire the nationality of their spouse and were allowed to repatriate if they had lost nationality through marriage by declaring a wish to do so, if the marriage had terminated. In 1970, Tonga ceased to be a British Protected State and joined the Commonwealth of Nations as an independent monarchy.

In 1982, the King and Privy Council of Tonga authorised the sale of passports granting persons diplomatic protection, but not nationality or citizenship of Tonga. Two years later, the Nationality Act was amended granting the King the authority to naturalise persons on humanitarian grounds, but the provision was repealed in 1988. The adoption law of that year, allowed only the adoption of illegitimate children or children who had been abandoned and whose mother was unknown. It specified that children obtained the nationality of their guardian upon completion of an adoption proceeding. Under terms of the Nationality Law of 1988, children born abroad to fathers who were not native-born Tongans were ineligible for Tongan nationality. Meaning if the father was born abroad or naturalised in Tonga, his children could not derive nationality if they were born outside of Tongan territory. Protected persons passports were reintroduced in 1996, allowing holders of those type of passports to apply for naturalisation.

=== 21st century ===
In 2007, amendments were made to the nationality law to eliminate gender disparities. The changes included the ability of either native-born Tongan parent to pass on their nationality to their child born in Tonga or abroad. It also legalised dual nationality and allowed children born abroad to Tongan mothers who were stateless to apply for registration as Tongan nationals. The Tongan Nationality Law was last amended in 2016.

== Tongans and Commonwealth citizenship ==
Tongan citizens are also Commonwealth citizens, and are thereby entitled to certain rights in the United Kingdom – notably the right to vote and stand for election.
