= 2010 Tongan Legislative Assembly =

The 2010 Tongan Legislative Assembly was established following the 2010 elections, the first under a new system which saw the majority of seats elected by universal suffrage. The Taimi Media Network described it as "Tonga's first democratically elected Parliament".

The Speaker of the 2010 Assembly was Lord Lasike, until he lost his seat in Parliament on 18 July 2012, following conviction for illicit ammunitions ownership. He was replaced as Speaker by Lord Fakafanua. The Deputy Speaker was initially Lord Tuʻiʻafitu, until he was appointed Minister for Health on 2 July 2012, whereupon he was replaced by Lord Tu'iha'teiho.

== Initial party standings ==
2010 Tongan Legislative Assembly election results
Party	Votes	%	Seats
Democratic Party of the Friendly Islands	10,953	28.49	12
Independent	25,873	67.30	5
People's Democratic Party	934	2.43	0
Sustainable Nation-Building Party	519	1.35	0
Tongan Democratic Labor Party	168	0.44	0
Noble representatives	54		9
Total	38,447	100.00	26

== Members ==
=== Initial MPs ===
Name	Party	Electorate	Term
ʻAkilisi Pohiva	DPFI	Tongatapu 1	Ninth
Semisi Kioa Lafu Sika	DPFI	Tongatapu 2	First
Sitiveni Halapua	DPFI	Tongatapu 3	First
'Isileli Pulu	DPFI	Tongatapu 4	Fourth
'Aisake Valu Eke	Independent	Tongatapu 5	First
Siosifa Tu'itupou Tu'utafaiva	DPFI	Tongatapu 6	First
Sione Sangster Saulala	DPFI	Tongatapu 7	First
P. Sione Havea Taione	DPFI	Tongatapu 8	First
Kaveinga Faʻanunu	DPFI	Tongatapu 9	First
Semisi Palu ‘Ifoni Tapueluelu	DPFI	Tongatapu 10	First
Sunia Fili	Independent	ʻEua 11	Fifth
Moʻale Finau	DPFI	Haʻapai 12	First
ʻUliti Uata	DPFI	Haʻapai 13	Eighth
Lisiate ʻAkolo	Independent	Vavaʻu 14	Third
Samiu Vaipulu	Independent	Vavaʻu 15	Seventh
Viliami Uasike Latu	Independent	Vavaʻu 16	First
Sosefo Feʻaomoeata Vakata	DPFI	Ongo Niua 17	First
Hon. Tuʻivakanō	Independent	Tongatapu Noble 1	Sixth
Hon. Maʻafu	Independent	Tongatapu Noble 2	Second
Hon. Vaea	Independent	Tongatapu Noble 3	First
Hon. Tuʻilakepa	Independent	Vavaʻu Noble 2	Fourth
Hon. Tu'i'afitu	Independent	Vavaʻu Noble 1	First
Hon. Lasike	Independent	ʻEua Noble	Third
Hon. Fusitu'a	Independent	Niuas Noble	First?
Hon. Tu'iha'teiho	Independent	Haʻapai Noble 1	Third
Hon. Fakafanua	Independent	Haʻapai Noble 2	Second

=== Summary of changes ===
- On 8 December 2010, Sosefo Vakata, People's Representative for Ongo Niua 17, left the Democratic Party of the Friendly Islands, to sit as an independent.
- On 24 July 2011, Kaveinga Faʻanunu, People's Representative for Tongatapu 9, a first term MP from the Democratic Party of the Friendly Islands, died of cancer. A by-election for Tongatapu 9 was held on 15 September 2011, and the seat was retained by the Democratic Party, through its candidate Falisi Tupou.
- On 18 July 2012, Lord Lasike, Nobles' Representative for ʻEua and Speaker of the Assembly, lost his seat by order of the King in application of the Constitution, following his conviction in court for illegal possession of firearms munitions. He was replaced by Lord Nuku in a by-election on 2 August.
- Lord Fusituaʻa, Nobles' Representative for the Niuas, died on 24 April 2014. His son Mataʻiʻulua ʻi Fonuamotu inherited his title on 6 May. The new Lord Fusituaʻa won his father's seat in Parliament through a by-election on 22 May.
