= 2008 Tongan Legislative Assembly =

The 2008 Tongan Legislative Assembly is the previous term of the Legislative Assembly of Tonga. Its composition was determined by the 2008 elections, held on April 23 and 24, 2008. It served until 2010, when special elections were held under a new constitution.

Nine members of the parliament were People's Representatives, nine represented the 33 nobles, and fourteen were Cabinet Ministers appointed by the King.

The Speaker of the 2008 Legislative Assembly was Hon Tu'ilakepa.

== Initial party standings ==
Summary of the 23 April/24 April 2008 Tongan Legislative Assembly election results
Parties	Votes	%	Seats
Human Rights and Democracy Movement	21,914	28.36	4
Independents	41,798	54.09	3
People's Democratic Party	10,798	13.97	2
Paati Langafonua Tu'uloa	2,768	3.58	0
Members elected by and among the 29 hereditary nobles of Tonga	9		
Members of the Privy Council (appointed by the King)	12		
Governors (appointed by the King)	2		
Total	77,278	100.00	30

== Members ==
Name	Party	Electorate	Term
Samuela 'Akilisi Pohiva	HRDM	Tongatapu No. 1	Eighth
'Isileli Pulu	HRDM	Tongatapu No. 2	Third
Clive Edwards	PDP	Tongatapu No. 3	Second?
'Etuate Lavulavu	Independent	Vava'u No. 1	Third
Samiu Vaipulu	Independent	Vava'u No. 2	Sixth
'Uliti Uata	HRDM	Ha'apai No. 1	Seventh
Sione Teisina Fuko	PDP	Ha'apai No. 2	Third
Sunia Fili	HRDM	Eua	Fourth
Sione Feingatau Iloa	Independent	Niuas	First
Hon Tu'ilakepa	Independent	Vava'u Noble 1	Third
Hon. Fielakepa	Independent	Tongatapu Noble 1	First
Hon. Ma'afu Tukui'aulahi	Independent	Tongatapu Noble 2	
Hon. Vaha'i	Independent	Tongatapu Noble 3	Second
Hon. Fulivai	Independent	Vava'u Noble 2	First
Hon Tu'iha'ateiho	Independent	Ha'apai Noble 1	Second
Hon Tu'iha'angana	Independent	Ha'apai Noble 2	Seventh
Hon Lasike	Independent	Eua Noble	Second
Hon. Tangipa	Independent	Niuas Noble	Second
Feleti Sevele	Independent	Cabinet Minister	Fourth
Viliami Tangi	Independent	Cabinet Minister	
Tevita Hala Palefau	Independent	Cabinet Minister	
Hon Tuita	Independent	Cabinet Minister	
Hon Nuku	Independent	Cabinet Minister	
Hon Tu'ivakano	Independent	Cabinet Minister	
Fineasi Funaki	Independent	Cabinet Minister	
Afu'alo Matoto	Independent	Cabinet Minister	
Lisiate 'Akolo	Independent	Cabinet Minister	
Tu'ipelehake Viliami Tupoulahi Mailefihi Tuku'aho	Independent	Cabinet Minister	
'Eseta Fusitu'a	Independent	Cabinet Minister	
Hon. Ma'afu Tukui'aulahi	Independent	Cabinet Minister	
Hon. Malupo	Independent	Governor of Ha'apai	
Hon. Luani	Independent	Governor of vava'u	
