= Elections in Tonga =

In Tonga, elections are held for the national unicameral parliament, the Legislative Assembly, and the local government posts of district and town officers. At the national level, Tongans elect 26 of the up to 30 members of parliament. Voters who are not members of the nobility elect 17 members of the Legislative Assembly, while nobles elect nine representatives. The prime minister may advise the monarch to appoint up to four members to the legislature, who serve as ex officio cabinet ministers. All elected officials are selected in direct elections.

A constitutional monarchy, Tonga has held elections since the 1870s; however, until the democratic reforms in 2010, commoners only elected a minority of representatives. With a majority of members of parliament either voted in by the nobility or appointed by the monarch, elections during this time had little effect on government composition. The first elections after democratisation were dominated by the Democratic Party of the Friendly Islands (PTOA). Following the death of the PTOA leader and prime minister, ʻAkilisi Pōhiva, in 2019, the party fragmented amidst infighting, with independents dominating the makeup of parliament since the 2021 election. Political parties tend to lack clear platforms, with most contestants choosing to campaign on their personal records.

== Voting ==
Tonga holds elections at the national and local levels. At the national level, Tongans elect 26 members of the Legislative Assembly, the unicameral national parliament. At the local level, citizens elect district and town officers. All elections are conducted using the first-past-the-post voting system, in which a candidate only requires a plurality of votes to win. As Tonga is a parliamentary constitutional monarchy, the prime minister, the nation's head of government, is not directly elected. The prime minister is instead elected by the other MPs and is formally appointed by the monarch. Elections are not held for the governors of the administrative divisions of Vavaʻu and Haʻapai, who are instead chosen by the monarch on the prime minister's recommendation.

=== Parliamentary elections ===
Tongans with commoner status elect 17 members of the Legislative Assembly, known as the people's representatives, who represent single-member constituencies. Nine MPs, known as the nobles' representatives, are elected by the 33 heads of families from the nobility and represent multi-member constituencies encompassing the country's island groups. Electors for these seats vote in the constituency in which their title is attached, thus nobles with plural titles are permitted to exercise plural votes. The number of MPs each noble's constituency returns depends on the electorate size. Until 2010, the people's representatives constituencies were elected in the same manner as the nobles' seats. The prime minister may advise the monarch to appoint an additional four unelected individuals to cabinet, who then become ex officio members of parliament (MP). Appointed members are entitled to vote in parliament, but are not allowed to vote in no-confidence motions on the prime minister. Vacancies are filled through by-elections. Candidates for the Legislative Assembly must be a Tongan citizen, at least 21 years old, able to read and write in the Tongan language, resident in the constituency they contest for at least three months before an election and not have a mental disability. Contestants must also go through a legal clearance to qualify. Until 2025, the nobles were exempt from this procedure. Members of the Legislative Assembly serve terms of up to four years, which was increased from three years in 2010. The monarch, however, can call a snap election without consulting the prime minister or cabinet. Before the introduction of the democratic reforms in 2010, the Legislative Assembly comprised 18 elected members; nine people's representatives and nine nobles' representatives. The other members were Privy Councillors, who also served as ex officio MPs, and were appointed by the monarch.

=== Local elections ===
At the local level, voters elect district and town officers. Largely responsible for oversight and executing government services, many officers also serve on village committees. As of 2016, there were 23 district officers and 156 town officers. Elections for officers are held every three years, and candidates must be at least 21 years old.

=== Eligibility ===
The 1875 Constitution of Tonga granted universal suffrage to all men aged 21 and over. An amendment to extend suffrage to women was approved in 1951, but did not take effect until 1960. Voting is not compulsory; it is, however, mandatory for eligible individuals to register to vote. The country does not employ overseas voting; electors residing abroad must travel back to Tonga to cast a ballot.

== History ==
Tonga first held elections for the Legislative Assembly in 1875, following the adoption of the constitution that year. Elections were initially held every five years, but were reduced to three years in 1915. Before democratisation in 2010, elections had no impact on the government formation, as most MPs were either nobles or appointees of the monarch. Political parties were non-existent until 1994, mainly due to the limited number of people's representatives and institutions such as churches and corporations remaining apolitical. Candidates for the people's seats would therefore typically campaign on their personal stature. While local affiliation and family lineage would entice electors to vote for certain individuals, these factors alone were usually insufficient to propel a contestant to victory.

An ad hoc organisation associated with former civil servant ʻAkilisi Pōhiva, known as the Pro-Democracy Movement, was formed in 1989 and began advocating for democratic reforms. The organisation eventually culminated in establishing a formal entity in 2002 called the Human Rights and Democracy Movement (HRDM). Despite democracy advocates holding demonstrations and submitting petitions to King Tāufaʻāhau Tupou IV, and affiliates of the HRDM winning seven of the nine people's seats at the 2002 election, the monarch ignored the movement's pleas.

Tāufaʻāhau Tupou IV died in 2006 and was succeeded by his son, George Tupou V, who supported democratic reforms. Despite disputes arising over the details of the proposed changes, resulting in riots in Nuku‘alofa that year, the democratic reforms were approved by parliament in 2010. The first election under democratisation occurred later that year. As in previous elections, most parties did not run on clear platforms, with candidates primarily campaigning on their personal records. Pōhiva formed the Democratic Party of the Friendly Islands (PTOA) shortly before the election, which emerged as the largest party. While elections since democratisation have usually been peaceful and orderly, the allocation of nine seats elected by a small electorate of nobles and life peers has been subject to domestic and international scrutiny.

The PTOA was included in the cabinet of Prime Minister Sialeʻataongo Tuʻivakanō, but it was not until after the 2014 election that the party would lead a government, with Pōhiva assuming the premiership. Pōhiva had a strained relationship with King Tupou VI, who called a snap election in 2017 on the advice of the parliamentary speaker, Sialeʻataongo Tuʻivakanō. The King did not consult Pōhiva on the decision, who declined to challenge it, and the PTOA went on to win a landslide victory, securing 14 of the 17 people's seats. The PTOA fractured and went into opposition following Pōhiva's death in 2019, with former party member, Pōhiva Tuʻiʻonetoa, forming a government with the nobles' support. At the 2021 election, the two rivals for the PTOA leadership, Sēmisi Sika and Siaosi Pōhiva, and their factions each fielded their own candidates against one another. The PTOA was reduced to three seats due to vote splitting, with independents winning the rest. Following the 2025 general election, the party lost all parliamentary representation, resulting in the Legislative Assembly being composed entirely of independents.

== See also ==
- Politics of Tonga
