= Vavaʻu Nobles' constituency =

Electoral constituency in Tonga

Vavaʻu Nobles
- Constituency for the Legislative Assembly of Tonga
- Region: Vavaʻu
- Electorate: 8

Current constituency
- Created: 1914?
- Number of members: 2
- Members: Lord Tuʻilakepa; Lord Tuʻiʻafitu

Vavaʻu is an electoral constituency which sends two representatives to the Legislative Assembly of Tonga. It covers the eponymous region and island chain.

Since its inception in 1875, the Assembly has consisted in representatives of the people and in members of the nobility. Following constitutional reforms in 2010, designed to strengthen democracy in the kingdom, the nobility elect nine representatives, while the people elect seventeen. The nobles' constituency in Vavaʻu thus overlaps with three single-seat peoples' constituencies.

Members of the nobility whose title is attached to lands in the constituency may vote there, and be elected as the constituency's representatives. Nobles do not formally stand as candidates, however, and never belong to any political party. There are eight titles of nobility attached to Vavaʻu: Fakatulolo, Fulivai, Luani, Tuʻiʻafitu, Tuʻilakepa, Tuita, ʻUlukalala, and Veikune. All are currently attributed, giving the constituency a full electorate of eight.

== History, recent elections and members ==
The constituency as such did not exist for the first Assembly in 1875. At that time, there were twenty nobles in all the kingdom, and they all sat in the Assembly, along with twenty elected peoples' representatives; the islands of Vavaʻu were associated with four titles of nobility. As the number of titles of nobility was increased by successive monarchs, a constitutional amendment in 1914 provided that the nobles would henceforth elect seven among them to represent them; the number of peoples' representatives was also decreased to seven. The nobles' constituency of Vavaʻu, as such, may have been established at this time.

Records of elections are sparse. In the 1996 general election, the Honourable Fulivai and the Honourable Veikune were elected; there is no further information. Nor is there any information for the 1999, 2002 or 2005 general election results. In the 2008 election, before nobles were restricted to voting only in the constituency associated with their lands, fifteen votes were cast; Honourable Luani and Honourable Tuʻilakepa were elected with three votes each. Lord Luani died in office in May 2010, and it was thus his successor to the title who voted in the November 2010 election. With the number of voters reduced to eight, the electorate was split evenly between two nobles, who were thus both elected.

=== Members of Parliament ===
Prior to 1996

no information

Since 1996

Year	First member	First party	Second member	Second party
1996	Lord Fulivai	none	Lord Veikune	none
1999, 2002, 2005	?		?	
2008	Lord Luani	none	Lord Tuʻilakepa	none
2010	Lord Tuʻiʻafitu	none	Lord Tuʻilakepa	none

== Election results ==
=== 2010 ===
Tongan general election, 2010: Vava'u (2 members)
Party	Candidate	Votes	%	±%
Independent	Lord Tuʻilakepa	4	50%	+30%
Independent	Lord Tuʻiʻafitu	4	50%	+36.7%
Majority		4	50%	
Majority		4	50%	
Lord Tuʻilakepa hold		Swing	+30%	
Lord Tuʻiʻafitu gain from Lord Luani		Swing	+36.7%	

=== 2008 ===
Tongan general election, 2008: Vava'u (2 members)
Party	Candidate	Votes	%	±%
Independent	Lord Luani	3	20%	
Independent	Lord Tuʻilakepa	3	20%	
Independent	Lord Fakatulolo	2	13.3%	
Independent	Lord Fulivai	2	13.3%	
Independent	Lord Tuita	2	13.3%	
Independent	Lord Tuʻiʻafitu	2	13.3%	
Independent	Prince ʻUlukalala	1	6.7%	
Majority		1	6.7%	
Majority		1	6.7%	

== See also ==
- Constituencies of Tonga
