= Sione Sangster Saulala =

Tongan politician (born 1974)

Sangster Saulala
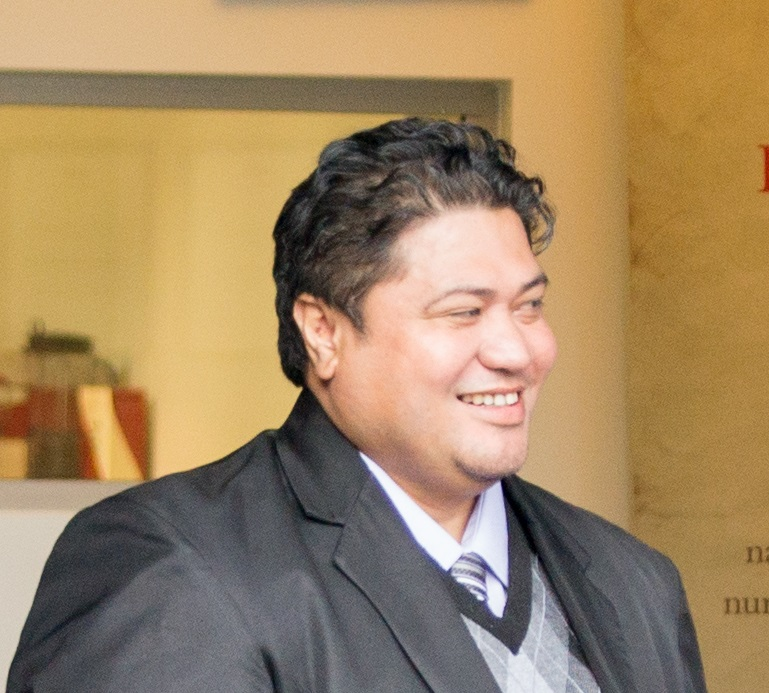
- Sangster Saulala in 2014

Minister for Internal Affairs
- In office 28 December 2021 – 10 August 2022
- Prime Minister: Siaosi Sovaleni
- Preceded by: Vatau Hui
- Succeeded by: ʻAlipate Tuʻivanuavou Vaea

Minister for Agriculture, Food, Forests and Fisheries
- In office 13 July 2012 – 27 November 2014
- Prime Minister: Lord Tuʻivakanō
- Preceded by: Lord Vaea
- Succeeded by: Semisi Fakahau

Member of the Tongan Parliament for Tongatapu 7
- In office 18 November 2021 – 10 August 2022
- Preceded by: Sione Vuna Fa'otusia
- Succeeded by: Paula Piukala
- In office 26 November 2010 – 27 November 2014
- Preceded by: none (constituency established)
- Succeeded by: Sione Vuna Fa'otusia

Personal details
- Born: 9 April 1974 (age 52)
- Party: Democratic Party of the Friendly Islands

Sione Sangster Saulala (born 9 April 1974) is a Tongan politician, broadcaster, and Cabinet Minister. He was a member of the Democratic Party of the Friendly Islands early in his political career.

== Personal background ==
He has a Bachelor of Arts degree in history, Politics and Business Management from the University of the South Pacific, and a Diploma in Education from the Tonga Teaching Training College.

Saulala is the manager of the Oceania Broadcasting Network and editor of the Tonga Star. In 2003, he was one of five people prosecuted for contempt of court for a television broadcast discussion the government's suppression of the Times of Tonga newspaper. In 2007 he was charged with sedition and riotous assembly over the 2006 Nuku'alofa riots, but the charges were later dismissed.

In 2007 Saulala served as chair of the Tonga Rugby Union. He was re-elected in 2009 but his election was disputed.

== Political career ==
He contested the 2005 elections, standing in Vava'u, and the 2008 elections, standing in Tongatapu, but was unsuccessful. He was elected to the Legislative Assembly of Tonga in the seat of Tongatapu 7 in the 2010 elections.

In October 2011, he introduced a controversial Arms and Ammunitions (Amendment) Bill to Parliament as a private member's bill. The aim of the bill was to reduce the maximum sentence for unlicensed possession, use or carrying of a firearm, from five years to one year and/or to a fine. Saulala explained that he was introducing the bill so as to "rationalise" and "humanise" the Arms and Ammunition Act 1968, at the request of his constituents who owned and used small firearms "for the familiar chores of shooting pigs and shooting chickens". The leader of the Democratic Party of the Friendly Islands, MP ʻAkilisi Pohiva, expressed surprise at the bill being submitted by a member of his party without the party caucus having been at all consulted. He expressed the view that, had it been discussed by the party, it would probably have been rejected without ever reaching the floor of the Assembly. Lord Tuʻihaʻateiho, a representative of the nobility from Haʻapai, was quoted by the Taimi Media Network as pointing out that, under the amendment, persons convicted of unlicensed possession of firearms would no longer lose the right to hold government office, including a seat in Parliament. The TMN argued that "therein lay the real reason for the Bill", as two representatives of the nobility (Lord Tuʻilakepa, and Lord Tuʻihaʻateiho himself in Parliament were awaiting trial on precisely that charge.

On 5 July 2012 Saulala joined the cabinet of Lord Tuʻivakanō as Minister for Agriculture, Food, Forests and Fisheries, but quit the day after he was appointed. A week later, he returned to the position.

He was not re-elected in the 2014 Tongan general election. He regained his seat in the 2021 election. On 28 December 2021 he was appointed to the Cabinet of Siaosi Sovaleni as Minister of Internal Affairs. On 2 May 2022 he was convicted of two counts of bribery in an election petition and his election was declared void. The conviction was stayed pending appeal on 26 May 2022. On 9 August 2022 his appeal was dismissed, and his election confirmed as void. He was formally unseated by Parliament on 10 August.
