= Haʻapai 13 =

Electoral constituency in Tonga

- Constituency for the Legislative Assembly of Tonga
- Region: Haʻapai

Current constituency
- Created: 2010
- Number of members: 1
- Party: Democratic Party of the Friendly Islands
- Member: Veivosa Taka

Haʻapai 13 is an electoral constituency for the Legislative Assembly in the Kingdom of Tonga. It was established for the November 2010 general election, when the multi-seat regional constituencies for People's Representatives were replaced by single-seat constituencies, electing one representative via the first past the post electoral system. Located in the Haʻapai island group, it encompasses the villages of Nomuka, Mango, Fonoifua, Haʻafeva, Kotu, Tungua, Tofua, Fotuhaʻa, Matuku, ʻOʻua, Fakakai, Pukotala, Ha'ano, Muitoa, Moʻungaʻone, Fotua, Fangaleʻounga, Lotofoa, Faleloa, Haʻateihosiʻi, and Haʻafakahenga. It is one of two constituencies in Haʻapai, the other being Haʻapai 12. (The number does not mean that it is the thirteenth in Haʻapai, but in the country.)

Its first ever representative was 'Uliti Uata, of the Democratic Party of the Friendly Islands. Pulu was first elected to the Assembly in 1975, then left politics in 1980, and returned to the Assembly in 1993, being re-elected continuously from that point on. In 2010, he thus began his eighth term as MP, in this new constituency. He was elected with an overwhelming majority, appearing to make this, at present, a safe seat for the party. In January 2011, he was appointed Minister for Health. He lost the seat in 2014 to Veivosa Taka, who has held it ever since.

== Members of Parliament ==
| Election | Member | Party |
|---|---|---|
| 2010 | 'Uliti Uata | Democratic Party of the Friendly Islands |
| 2014 | Veivosa Taka | Democratic Party of the Friendly Islands |
| 2017 | Veivosa Taka | Democratic Party of the Friendly Islands |
| 2021 | Veivosa Taka | Democratic Party of the Friendly Islands |

== Election results ==
=== 2010 ===
Tongan general election, 2010: Haʻapai 13
| Party | Candidate | Votes | % | ±% |
|---|---|---|---|---|
| Democrats | 'Uliti Uata | 1090 | 70.5 | |
| PDP | Sione Teisina Fuko | 253 | 16.4 | |
| PLT | Lopeti Kamipeli Tofa | 204 | 13.2 | |
| Majority | | 837 | 54.1 | n/a |
| Democrats win (new seat) | | | | |

== See also ==
- Constituencies of Tonga
