= Veivosa Taka =

Tongan politician

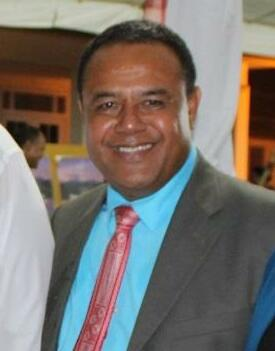
- Veivosa Taka in 2017

Member of Parliament for Haʻapai 13
- In office 27 November 2014 – 20 November 2025
- Preceded by: ‘Uliti Uata
- Succeeded by: Esafe Latu

Personal details
- Born: October 18, 1961 (age 64)
- Party: Democratic Party of the Friendly Islands

Veivosa Light of Day Taka (born 18 October 1961) is a Tongan politician and former Member of the Legislative Assembly of Tonga. He is a member of the Democratic Party of the Friendly Islands.

Before entering politics Taka was a shipping director, retail manager, and District Officer for Haʻapai. He was first elected to the Legislative Assembly in the 2014 Tongan general election. He was re-elected at the 2017 election. In November 2016 he was appointed Chairman of the Committee of the Whole House.

He was re-elected in the 2021 election. He subsequently supported Siaosi Sovaleni for Prime Minister. While offered a cabinet position, he decided to remain outside cabinet.

He lost his seat at the 2025 election.
