= 2008 Tongan general election =

- 23–24 April 2008
- 18 of the 30 seats in the Legislative Assembly
- Turnout: 46.69% (▼3.83pp)
| Party | Leader | Vote % | Seats | +/– |
|---|---|---|---|---|
| HRDM | ʻAkilisi Pōhiva | 28.47 | 4 | −3 |
| PDP | Sione Teisina Fuko | 14.02 | 2 | New |
| Independents | – | 57.51 | 3 | +1 |
This lists parties that won seats. See the complete results below.
| Prime Minister before | Prime Minister after |
|---|---|
| Feleti Sevele; HRDM | Feleti Sevele; HRDM |

General elections were held in Tonga from 23 to 24 April 2008 to elect 18 members of the Legislative Assembly. Voting for the nobles' representatives took place on 23 April, while the elections for nine seats held by commoners occurred the following day. The pro-reform camp experienced a rupture following the 2005 election, with some members defecting from the Human Rights and Democracy Movement (HRDM) to form the People's Democratic Party (PDP). The 2008 election was held while efforts by the government to implement democratic reforms were underway. In contrast to past elections, where debate occurred between advocates of reforms and others favouring the status quo, by this election, it had shifted to the question of what form democratisation should take. The election occurred while a state of emergency, imposed following the 2006 Nukuʻalofa riots, was still in force.

While much of the public favoured the reforms, most candidates focused on other issues during the campaign. Furthermore, most contestants lacked name recognition and clear policies. Shortly before the election, the Tonga Broadcasting Commission controversially declared that it would censor campaign broadcasts and not publish political stories, stating its staff were ill-equipped to report on such issues. The decision drew condemnation from the government, pro-reform lawmakers and international figures. The election saw low voter turnout, with only 46% of registered electors participating. The HRDM won four of the people's seats, the PDP captured two, and the other three went to independents. Six of the successful people's candidates were facing sedition charges over the 2006 riots. Parliamentary Speaker Havea Tuʻihaʻangana lost his seat, while no women were elected. The 2008 election was the last to occur before the passage of the democratic reforms in 2010, where seats elected by commoners would constitute a majority in parliament.

== Background ==
The pro-reform HRDM won seven of the nine people's seats during the previous election, held on 17 March 2005, losing only in Vavaʻu, where two independents were victorious. As in past elections, pro-democracy candidates campaigned primarily on accountability and curbing corruption. The election, which saw voter turnout reach 50%, generated widespread interest due to an announcement before the poll by King Tāufaʻāhau Tupou IV, promising to elevate two of the people's representatives and two elected nobles to cabinet. As such, after the election, two HRDM-affiliated MPs were appointed, including Feleti Sevele, who became minister of labour, commerce and industries. No women were elected, although ‘Illaisa Lepolo Taunisila entered the legislature after she won a May by-election to the Niuas seat. A group of HRDM members defected to form the PDP several months after the general election, causing a fracture in the pro-reform camp. Futa Helu, an academic who played a key role in the PDP's establishment, claimed the HRDM MPs were prioritising their own interests above those of the public. In February 2006, Prince ‘Ulukālala Lavaka Aka (the future King Tupou VI) abruptly resigned as prime minister; no official explanation was disclosed. Crown Prince Tupoutoʻa, acting as regent for the ailing monarch, subsequently appointed Sevele, who became the country's first non-aristocratic prime minister.

Tāufaʻāhau Tupou IV died in September 2006 and was succeeded by Tupoutoʻa, who became George Tupou V. The new monarch, unlike his father, supported democratic reforms, allowing democratisation to gain traction. Disputes around what form democratisation would take, however, subsequently emerged. Negotiations between reformists and the government were further complicated by the former reportedly altering their proposals numerous times. During a negotiation between Sevele and pro-reform MP ʻAkilisi Pōhiva in November 2006, riots broke out in Nukuʻalofa, destroying much of the central business district, including a supermarket owned by Sevele and many Chinese-owned businesses. Rioters also struck the building hosting the prime minister's office, and the government subsequently declared a state of emergency. While the riots were reportedly attributed to the pressing demands for immediate democratisation by five reformist politicians, the identities of the individuals who planned and facilitated the destruction remained unclear. Five reformist members of parliament were subsequently charged with sedition. Despite the riots, the monarch announced that reforms would proceed.

== Electoral system ==
At the time of the 2008 election, the Legislative Assembly comprised 18 elected seats, with the nobles and commoners each electing nine members. A further 12 ex officio members of the legislature were appointed by the monarch and concurrently served as cabinet ministers. There was no formal nomination process for the nobles seats, the electorate of which comprised 29 individuals with nobility titles during this election. Thus all of the nobles were eligible to receive votes, regardless of whether they declared their intentions to stand in the election. Both the nobles' and people's members were elected through plurality block voting, representing constituencies encompassing Tonga's five island groups. The constituencies for the nobles' and commoners' seat compositions mirrored one another, although the former had a significantly smaller electorate. Tongatapu returned three members, Haʻapai and Vavaʻu both elected two, while ʻEua and the Niuas were each represented by one lawmaker. Eligible candidates and voters were required to hold Tongan citizenship and be at least 21 years old. Individuals with criminal convictions, mental illness, or illiteracy were ineligible to contest the election. Candidates standing for a people's constituency were required to obtain the signatures of at least 50 enrolled voters and pay a deposit. Voting was not compulsory, although it was mandatory for individuals to register on the electoral roll. Overseas voting was not employed; voters were required to be in Tonga on election day to cast a ballot. A total of 68,370 individuals were registered to vote.

== Candidates and campaign ==
A total of 71 candidates contested the election, including a record eight women. The HRDM and the PDP ran in the election; however, because the electoral commission did not display party affiliations on the ballots, even though these contesting parties were registered with the registrar of elections. Despite their absence from the ballots, many of the parties' candidates nonetheless identified themselves as members of their parties during the campaign. Five incumbent people's representatives ran for re-election despite facing sedition charges stemming from the 2006 riots.

Unlike in previous elections, where the issues centred on whether the country should adopt democratic reforms, the 2008 election was the first in which the debate was about what form democratisation ought to take. A majority of voters reportedly favoured political reforms; however, the contesting parties and candidates had a lack of clear policies. Furthermore, most candidates had little to no name recognition and campaign promotional material was scarce. ‘Akilisi Pōhiva dominated the HRDM's campaign, yet despite his status as a pro-reform figure, he instead chose to prioritise economic development. One journalist compared Pōhiva's campaign and its support to that of a cargo cult.

Weeks before the election, the Tonga Broadcasting Commission announced it would not publish any political stories, stating its staff lacked the necessary training, and that it would censor candidates' political broadcasts. The decision drew domestic and international scrutiny, including from the information minister, Afualo Matoto, who said it was "damaging to Tonga's image overseas". Tonga Review said the decision would undermine freedom of speech and compared Tonga with Zimbabwe. At the same time, Tongatapu MP claimed the restrictions were implemented to prevent the re-election of incumbent people's representatives.

== Conduct ==
The election supervisor confirmed the election dates on 8 January; candidate nominations concluded on 27 February; and voter registration closed on 31 March. The polls were held while the state of emergency was still in place since the 2006 riots. The government did not offer a specific justification for extending the state of emergency, but alluded to alleged security threats from parts of the pro-democracy camp. Incumbent MP Clive Edwards, who was running for re-election, claimed the government was using the extension to intimidate its political opponents. The election for the nobles took place on 23 April at the palace office. Voting for the people's seats took place the following day; many polling stations were reportedly deserted, with numerous voters viewing the elections as unimportant and inconsequential. Polling stations in Nukuʻalofa, however, saw a higher voter turnout, due to a higher concentration of politically active electors.

== Results ==
The HRDM retained four of the people's seats, a decrease from seven in 2005, and the PDP secured two. The other three went to independents. Six of the incumbent people's representatives won re-election, two former MPs returned to parliament, while one was a newcomer. Of the nine elected candidates, six were facing sedition charges from the 2006 riots. Two of the people's MPs lost their seats, including Viliami Latu, who narrowly lost the Vava‘u constituency, and the sole female MP, ‘Illaisa Lepolo Taunisila. None of the other female candidates were successful. Latu requested a recount in Vava‘u, which confirmed the original result. Parliamentary Speaker Havea Tuʻihaʻangana was defeated in his re-election bid to the Haʻapai noble constituency. Voter turnout reached 46%, a decrease from 50% in 2005.

| Party | Votes | % | Seats | ± |
|---|---|---|---|---|
| Human Rights and Democracy Movement | 21,995 | 28.47 | 4 | –3 |
| People's Democratic Party | 10,828 | 14.02 | 2 | New |
| Independents | 44,423 | 57.51 | 3 | +1 |
| Nobles' representatives | | | 9 | 0 |
| Royal appointees | | | 12 | 0 |
| Total | 77,246 | 100.00 | 30 | 0 |
| Total votes | 32,091 | – | | |
| Registered voters/turnout | 68,730 | 46.69 | | |
Source: Psephos, IPU

=== By constituency ===
==== People's seats ====
| Constituency | Candidate | Party | Votes | % |
|---|---|---|---|---|
| ʻEua | Sunia Fili | HRDM | 861 | 35.4 |
| ʻEua | Tevita Lavemaau | Independent | 510 | 21.0 |
| ʻEua | Tevita Tupou | Independent | 446 | 18.3 |
| ʻEua | Siosaia Hausia | Independent | 279 | 11.5 |
| ʻEua | Tuʻipulotu Lauaki | Independent | 137 | 5.6 |
| ʻEua | ʻAsipeli Mafi | Independent | 130 | 5.3 |
| ʻEua | Veisinia Tuʻitakau Kaho | Independent | 56 | 2.3 |
| ʻEua | Hakeai Vea Havea | Independent | 12 | 0.5 |
| Haʻapai | ʻUliti Uata | HRDM | 2,555 | 29.7 |
| Haʻapai | Sione Teisina Fuko | PDP | 1,404 | 16.3 |
| Haʻapai | Moʻale Finau | Independent | 1,256 | 14.6 |
| Haʻapai | ʻOsai Latu | Independent | 1,062 | 12.3 |
| Haʻapai | Siosaia Maʻake Paluto | Independent | 885 | 10.3 |
| Haʻapai | Sione Tuʻitupou Fotu | Independent | 412 | 4.8 |
| Haʻapai | Lopeti Kamipeli Tofa | Independent | 409 | 4.8 |
| Haʻapai | Siaosi Vaikona | Independent | 318 | 3.7 |
| Haʻapai | Siaosi Finau | Independent | 309 | 3.6 |
| Niuafoʻou and Niuatoptapu | Sione Feingatau ʻIloa | Independent | 476 | 36.6 |
| Niuafoʻou and Niuatoptapu | Sione Haukinima | Independent | 367 | 28.2 |
| Niuafoʻou and Niuatoptapu | ‘Illaisa Lepolo Taunisila | HRDM | 241 | 18.5 |
| Niuafoʻou and Niuatoptapu | ʻOfa Simiki | Independent | 217 | 16.7 |
| Tongatapu | ʻAkilisi Pōhiva | HRDM | 11,290 | 22.4 |
| Tongatapu | ʻIsileli Pulu | HRDM | 7,048 | 14.0 |
| Tongatapu | Clive Edwards | PDP | 6,697 | 13.3 |
| Tongatapu | Sione Sangster Saulala | Independent | 5,461 | 10.8 |
| Tongatapu | ʻInoke Fotu Huʻakau | Independent | 2,802 | 5.6 |
| Tongatapu | Sione Fonua | Independent | 2,768 | 5.5 |
| Tongatapu | Sēmisi Palu ʻIfoni Tapueluelu | PDP | 2,727 | 5.4 |
| Tongatapu | Mele Teusivi ʻAmanaki | Independent | 1,523 | 3.0 |
| Tongatapu | Sēmisi ʻOfa Fukofuka | Independent | 1,150 | 2.3 |
| Tongatapu | Mateitalo Folaumoetao Mahuʻinga | Independent | 1,136 | 2.3 |
| Tongatapu | ʻAlisi Pone Fotu | Independent | 1,082 | 2.1 |
| Tongatapu | Sitīveni Takaetali Finau | Independent | 922 | 1.8 |
| Tongatapu | Mateaki Ki he Lotu Heimuli | Independent | 828 | 1.6 |
| Tongatapu | Latanoa Pikula | Independent | 765 | 1.5 |
| Tongatapu | Sateki Finau | Independent | 675 | 1.3 |
| Tongatapu | Filimone Fifita | Independent | 649 | 1.3 |
| Tongatapu | Sulunga Lavaka | Independent | 544 | 1.1 |
| Tongatapu | ʻAkanete Taʻai Lauti | Independent | 454 | 0.9 |
| Tongatapu | Sione Tuʻiʻonetia | Independent | 354 | 0.7 |
| Tongatapu | Salesi Kauvaka | Independent | 269 | 0.5 |
| Tongatapu | Tupou Malohi | Independent | 259 | 0.5 |
| Tongatapu | ʻAlani Fisher Taione | Independent | 184 | 0.4 |
| Tongatapu | Sēmisi Nauto Tuapasi ʻAtaʻata | Independent | 175 | 0.3 |
| Tongatapu | Malu Faletau | Independent | 145 | 0.3 |
| Tongatapu | ʻEliu Hafoka | Independent | 141 | 0.3 |
| Tongatapu | Punalei Nuku | Independent | 124 | 0.2 |
| Tongatapu | Hotatau Tenisi | Independent | 118 | 0.2 |
| Tongatapu | ʻEliesa Fifita | Independent | 98 | 0.2 |
| Vavaʻu | ʻEtuate Lavulavu | Independent | 2,116 | 14.6 |
| Vavaʻu | Samiu Vaipulu | Independent | 1,896 | 13.1 |
| Vavaʻu | Viliami Latu | Independent | 1,845 | 12.7 |
| Vavaʻu | Salesi Paea | Independent | 1,471 | 10.1 |
| Vavaʻu | Masao Paʻasi | Independent | 1,213 | 8.4 |
| Vavaʻu | ʻOpeti Pulotu | Independent | 917 | 6.3 |
| Vavaʻu | Viliami Kaufusi Helu | Independent | 726 | 5.0 |
| Vavaʻu | Tevita Moengangongo Saia | Independent | 700 | 4.8 |
| Vavaʻu | Sione Kilipati Lea | Independent | 674 | 4.6 |
| Vavaʻu | Peauafi Tatafu | Independent | 547 | 3.8 |
| Vavaʻu | Polutele Tuʻihalamaka | Independent | 544 | 3.7 |
| Vavaʻu | Viliula Mafi | Independent | 442 | 3.0 |
| Vavaʻu | Moleni Taufa | Independent | 383 | 2.6 |
| Vavaʻu | Viliami Pasikala | Independent | 191 | 1.3 |
| Vavaʻu | Keuli Pasina Lavaki | Independent | 185 | 1.3 |
| Vavaʻu | Pauka K. Kava | Independent | 175 | 1.2 |
| Vavaʻu | ʻOfa Kitokelau Fakalata | Independent | 113 | 0.8 |
| Vavaʻu | Mataiasi Moteni Moala | Independent | 104 | 0.7 |
| Vavaʻu | Tongovua Tae Appleton | Independent | 78 | 0.5 |
| Vavaʻu | Temaleti Levaitai Fulivai Fakaʻosi | Independent | 73 | 0.5 |
| Vavaʻu | Kapeliele Fungalei Cocker | Independent | 72 | 0.5 |
| Vavaʻu | Toʻofohe Loketi Teaupa | Independent | 51 | 0.4 |
Source: Psephos

==== Nobles ====
| Constituency | Candidate | Votes | % |
|---|---|---|---|
| ʻEua | Hon. Lasike | 7 | 63.6 |
| ʻEua | Hon. Fohe | 3 | 27.3 |
| ʻEua | Baron Vaea of Houma | 1 | 9.1 |
| Haʻapai | Hon. Tuʻihaʻateiho | 3 | 21.4 |
| Haʻapai | Hon. Tuʻipelehake | 3 | 21.4 |
| Haʻapai | Hon. Fakafanua | 2 | 14.3 |
| Haʻapai | Hon. Malupo | 2 | 14.3 |
| Haʻapai | Hon. Niukapu | 2 | 14.3 |
| Haʻapai | Hon. Tuʻihaʻangana | 2 | 14.3 |
| Niuafoʻou/Niuatoputapu | Hon. Tangipa | 2 | 66.7 |
| Niuafoʻou/Niuatoputapu | Hon. Fotofili | 1 | 33.3 |
| Tongatapu | Hon. Fielakepa | 10 | 30.3 |
| Tongatapu | Hon. Maʻafu | 10 | 30.3 |
| Tongatapu | Hon. Fohe | 6 | 18.2 |
| Tongatapu | Hon. Vahaʻi | 4 | 12.1 |
| Tongatapu | Baron Vaea of Houma | 3 | 9.1 |
| Vavaʻu | Hon. Luani | 3 | 20.0 |
| Vavaʻu | Hon. Tuʻilakepa | 3 | 20.0 |
| Vavaʻu | Hon. Fakatulolo | 2 | 13.3 |
| Vavaʻu | Hon. Fulivai | 2 | 13.3 |
| Vavaʻu | Hon. Tuita | 2 | 13.3 |
| Vavaʻu | Hon. Tuʻiʻafitu | 2 | 13.3 |
| Vavaʻu | Prince ʻUlukalala | 1 | 6.7 |
Source: Matangi Tonga

== Aftermath ==
The election effectively maintained the status quo parliamentary composition, with pro-reform candidates continuing to occupy most of the people's seats. The King appointed Malakai Fakatoufifita, a representative of the Vava‘u nobles constituency, as the speaker of parliament on 29 April, while Sevele remained prime minister. Princess Pilolevu Tuita, acting as regent on behalf of the monarch, opened the first post-election session of the Legislative Assembly on 29 May. The government continued to work towards democratisation thereafter. In April 2010, parliament approved amendments that saw the people's seats comprise a majority in the legislature, with a snap election taking place in November. As such, the 2008 election was the last to be held under the pre-reform system.
