= 1984 Tongan general election =

General elections were held in Tonga on 7 May 1984. Nine nobles were elected to the Legislative Assembly by their peers, whilst a further nine People's Representatives were publicly elected. All candidates were independents.

== Background ==
In 1981 plans were announced to increase the number of elected representatives for nobles and commoners from seven to nine. The People's Representatives seats were increased by adding two new constituencies, Niuafoʻou and Niuatoputapu, both of which had previously been part of the Tongatapu constituency.
