= Tongatapu 7 =

Electoral constituency in Tonga

- Constituency for the Legislative Assembly of Tonga
- Region: Tongatapu

Current constituency
- Created: 2010
- Number of members: 1
- Party: Independent
- Member(s): Sione Saulala

Tongatapu 7 is an electoral constituency for the Legislative Assembly in the Kingdom of Tonga. It was established for the November 2010 general election, when the multi-seat regional constituencies for People's Representatives were replaced by single-seat constituencies, electing one representative via the first past the post electoral system. Located on the country's main island, Tongatapu, it encompasses the villages of Pea, Tokomololo, Haʻateiho, Lotohaʻapai, and part of Tofoa and Koloua.

Its first ever representative was Sione Saulala, a first time MP, representing the Democratic Party of the Friendly Islands. He lost the seat to the Democratic Party of the Friendly Islands's Sione Vuna Fa'otusia in 2014, but regained it at the 2021 election.

== Members of Parliament ==
Election	Member	Party
2010	Sione Saulala	Democratic Party of the Friendly Islands
2014	Sione Vuna Fa'otusia	Democratic Party of the Friendly Islands
2017	Sione Vuna Fa'otusia	Democratic Party of the Friendly Islands
2021	Sione Saulala	independent

== Election results ==
=== 2010 ===
Tongan general election, 2010: Tongatapu 7
Party	Candidate	Votes	%	±%
DPFI	Sione Sangster Saulala	847	32.6	
(unknown)	Giulio Masasso Tu’ikolongahau Paunga	621	23.9	
(unknown)	Sione Vuna Fa'otusia	429	16.5	
(unknown)	Mavaetangi Manavahetau	240	9.2	
(unknown)	Siosifa Filini Sikuea	160	6.2	
(unknown)	Peato Tauholoaki Takai	117	4.5	
(unknown)	‘Anau Ki Lifuka ‘Anau	89	3.4	
(unknown)	‘Amanaki Paea Molitika	59	2.3	
(unknown)	Finau Lea’aetalafo’ou	23	0.9	
(unknown)	Hoatatau Tenisi	15	0.6	
Majority		226	8.7	n/a
DPFI win (new seat)				

== See also ==
- Constituencies of Tonga
