= 2006 Nukuʻalofa riots =

2006 civil unrest and riots in Tonga

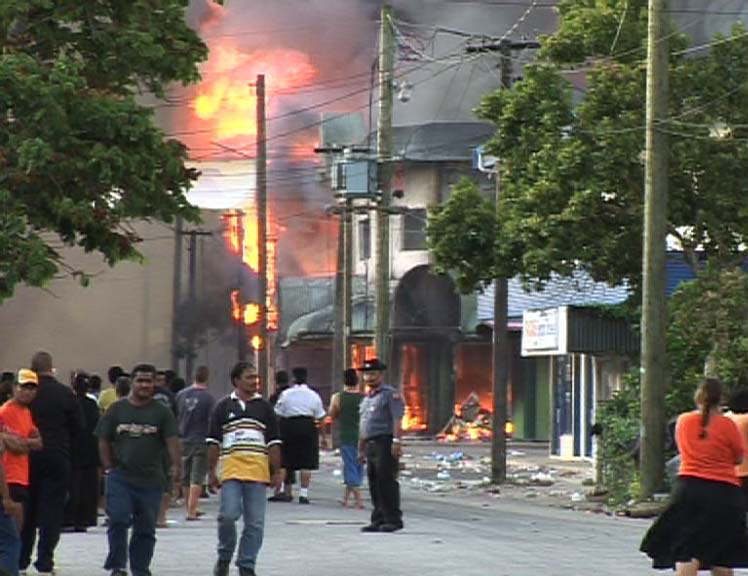
- The start of the major fires due to the Nukuʻalofa riots
- Date: 16 November 2006
- Location: Nukuʻalofa, Tonga; 21°8′S 175°12′W
- Result: Riots end: Declaration of a state of emergency

Parties
Tonga Supported by: Australia New Zealand	Protesters

Lead figures
George Tupou V Lord Sevele of Vailahi; Lord Tuʻihaʻangana	No centralised leadership

Units involved
Tonga Defence Services; Tonga Police Force	

Casualties
- Deaths: 6
- Arrested: 571

The 2006 Nukuʻalofa riots, also known as the 2006 Tongan riots, started on 16 November, in the Tongan capital of Nukuʻalofa. The Legislative Assembly of Tonga was due to adjourn for the year and despite promises of action, had done little to advance democracy in the government. A mixed crowd of democracy advocates took to the streets in protest. The riots saw a number of cases of robbery, looting, vehicle theft, arson, and various property damage.

== Targets of riots ==
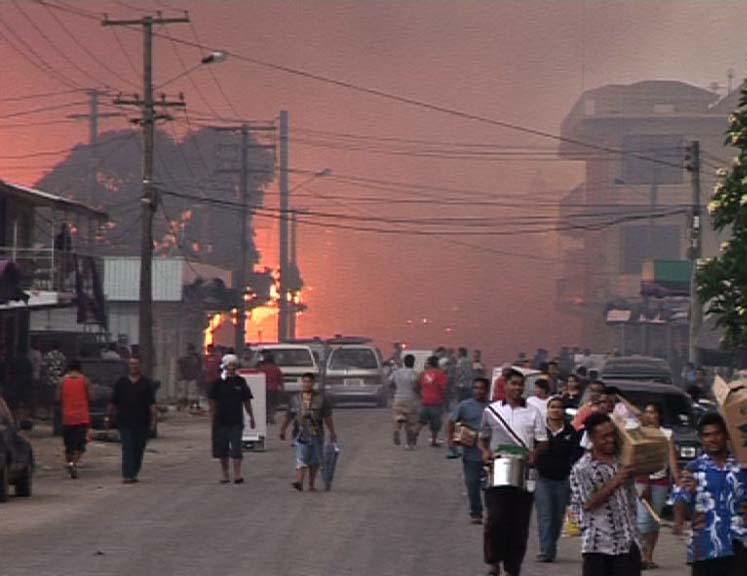
Looters walking

Riots broke out around 3:30 pm TOT as rioters threw stones, broke windows, and looted. By about 6:00 pm, rioters started setting buildings on fire. The first targets of the rioters were government buildings. Then they attacked enterprises, including some that were leased to ANZ Bank and those owned by the Prime Minister Feleti Sevele.

A private shop selling mobile telephones and advertising for Tonfön (part of the Shoreline Group of Companies owned, at the time, by the royal family) was next. Rioters also attacked and burned the main office of the Shoreline Group of Companies, which was located 1 km (0.62 mi) away from the small central business district.

Several of the larger Chinese shops were targeted for looting and burning. Other shops, including one owned by ethnic Indians, were burned as well, but it is not clear if they were intentionally set on fire or caught fire from surrounding buildings.

At about 6:00 PM TOT rioters torched the Royal Pacific hotel (owned by the Shoreline Group of Companies). The hotel was located on one of the main roads into the city. There are many commercial buildings on the thoroughfare, and the fire spread to some of those buildings as well.

According to an article in Tonga Now, normally law-abiding Tongans of both sexes and all ages were participating avidly in the looting. However, some photos would seem to indicate that the car-tipping and arson were the work of young men. This conception would be reinforced after a destroyed Chinese shop was vandalized with graffiti.

At nightfall, the police and the Tonga Defence Services regained control of the central business district and were turning away anyone who tried to enter.

== Aftermath ==
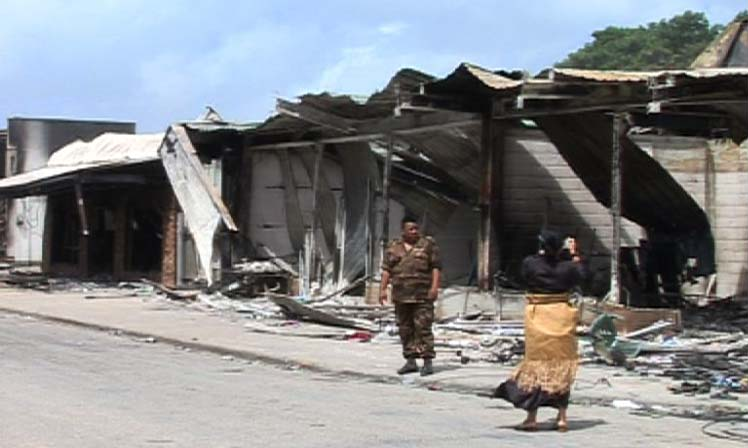
The day after, a journalist under the watchful eye of the army

Estimates of the damage varied. Some estimates said that 60 to 80% of the central business district was destroyed.

=== 17 November ===
It was announced that eight bodies had been found in charred ruins. Since most of the employees of the affected businesses managed to reach safety, news reports speculated that the dead were likely looters. It is not clear if the deceased have been identified or if identified, when their names will be released.

The Tongan government declared a state of emergency. Only firefighters, police, utility workers, etc. were allowed inside a perimeter defined by Vuna road, ʻAlipate road, Mateialona road, and Tupoulahi road. Residents of that area could enter only after being searched. For the next month, gatherings of more than five persons were illegal in that area. Emergency laws gave security forces the right to stop and search people without a warrant.

The Tongan government promised reform. Popular elections were held in 2008.

The Chinese embassy chartered an airplane to evacuate Chinese nationals.

=== 18 November ===
Australia and New Zealand sent 110 military personnel and 44 police officers to help the local police to establish order, with the Australian contingent consisting of 50 military and 35 police; they began arriving on 18 November after the Tongan government requested assistance the previous day. The New Zealand army was to be in charge of airport security and the police were to protect the staff of the New Zealand High Commission. The members of the Australian police contingent were to assist and relieve exhausted Tongan police.

=== 19 November ===
A leader of the Tongan pro-democracy movement, MP 'Akilisi Pohiva, criticised the intervention of Australian and New Zealand peacekeepers following the riots.

=== 20 November ===
Some businesses had temporarily relocated to the suburbs. Some looted items were returned. Police were guarding the telecommunications center and investigating mobile call logs. According to the Matangi Tonga newspaper, twenty-six arrests had been made and the number of deaths had been revised down to six.

=== 22 November ===
Nukuʻalofa was by now largely peaceful. The town center was still cordoned off and heavily patrolled, but local shop owners and the like could easily get permission to enter the restricted area. Some Chinese shops which escaped damage were now open again. Major shops and banks, however, were still operating from temporary locations in the suburbs.

=== 1 December ===
Peace was believed to be restored and foreign forces began leaving. The forbidden area in town was reduced. Police had made 571 arrests.

=== 2007 ===
The first business to rebuild and reopen was the Fung Shin supermarket, which opened in new premises on 19 December 2007.

=== 2008 ===
In November 2008, rebuilding began with an anticipated three years of work for the infrastructure to be complete. Roads, footpaths, drainage and more were planned by Minister Paul Karalus. Funding was provided by low-interest Chinese government loans amounting to $US55 million.

=== 2018 ===
In July 2018, Tonga was expected to begin the repayments of loans from China for reconstruction that ended up being US$100 million+ to the Chinese government. The commitment to begin this process was made by ʻAkilisi Pōhiva.

=== Maintaining the state of emergency ===
In late January 2008, the Tongan authorities renewed a Proclamation of Public Order for the sixteenth month running, a lingering aftermath of the riots. The statement reads: "It is hereby proclaimed that there continues to exist a state of danger" in central Nukuʻalofa. According to the Proclamation, the area will remain "controlled and maintained by the Tonga Police Force and Tonga Defence Services for the sole purpose of maintaining public order for all people of the country". Tongan information minister Afualo Matoto announced that the state of emergency would probably be maintained for another three months (i.e., until the end of April). This was criticised by Tongan pro-democracy advocate ʻAkilisi Pōhiva: "I don’t see any reason for government to continue to hold on to the emergency power."

The state of emergency was lifted in August 2008. Member of Parliament ʻAkilisi Pōhiva noted that the government had probably chosen to wait until after the coronation of King George Tupou V to put an end to it. It was, however, re-imposed in September, despite the objections of pro-democracy members of Parliament.

== Operation Kaliloa ==
A joint investigation into the riots by the Tonga police, Australian Federal Police and New Zealand Police, codenamed Operation Kaliloa, began. 678 people were arrested, some under controversial circumstances, with former Police Minister Clive Edwards also being charged after claiming that soldiers had engaged in indiscriminate beatings. Democratic leader ʻAkilisi Pōhiva was arrested on charges of sedition, along with Edwards and a number of other pro-democracy MPs and activists. In total there were 320 prosecutions related to the riots. No-one was convicted of any political charge. Most non-sedition charges against MPs were withdrawn in September 2007, and all were ultimately acquitted in March 2009. Democracy campaigner Sione Halafuka Vea was acquitted in July 2007. Charges against businesswoman 'Ofa Simiki, who the government had claimed masterminded the riots, were withdrawn in April 2008. MP ʻIsileli Pulu was acquitted on charges of abetting murder and arson in July 2008. Sedition charges against broadcaster Sione Sangster Saulala were also dismissed that month. Charges against Edwards were dismissed in May 2010.

The state of emergency declared on 17 November 2006 was extended several times. It was finally ended in January 2011 once the new Prime Minister took office following the 2010 election, itself preceded by constitutional reform.

== See also ==
- 2021 Solomon Islands unrest
