= 1996 Tongan general election =

General elections were held in Tonga on 24 and 25 January 1996 to elect members of the Legislative Assembly of Tonga. The nobles were elected on 24 January and the nine people's representatives on 25 January. A total of 61 candidates ran for the latter. Voter turnout was 56.1%.

== Results ==
| Party | Votes | % | Seats | +/– |
|---|---|---|---|---|
| Pro-reform candidates | 38,196 | 57.25 | 6 | 0 |
| Anti-reform candidates | 28,517 | 42.75 | 3 | 0 |
| Nobles' representatives | | | 9 | 0 |
| Total | 66,713 | 100.00 | 18 | 0 |
| Valid votes | 27,935 | 99.95 | | |
| Invalid/blank votes | 13 | 0.05 | | |
| Total votes | 27,948 | 100.00 | | |
| Registered voters/turnout | 49,830 | 56.09 | | |
Source: Nohlen et al.

=== Elected members ===
| Constituency | Nobles' representatives | People's representatives |
|---|---|---|
| Tongatapu | Hon Lasike | 'Akilisi Pohiva |
| Tongatapu | Hon Kalanivalu | Mahe 'Uli'uli Tupouniua |
| Tongatapu | Hon Tu'ivakano | Viliami Fukofuka |
| Vava'u | Hon Veikune | Samiu Vaipulu |
| Vava'u | Hon Fulivai | Masao Paasi |
| Eua | Hon Nuku | Tu'ipulotu L. Lauaki |
| Niuas | Hon Fusitu'a | 'Aisea Ta'ofi |
| Ha'apai | Hon Malupõ | 'Uliti Uata |
| Ha'apai | Hon Tu'iha'angana | Sione Teisina Fuko |
Source: Tongatapu.net
