= Fatafehi Fuatakifolaha =

Tongan noble and politician

The Honorable Lord Veikune

Speaker of the Legislative Assembly
- In office 1999 – 2001
- Preceded by: Lord Fusitu'a
- Succeeded by: Lord Tuʻivakanō

Speaker of the Legislative Assembly
- In office 2005 – 2006
- Preceded by: Lord Tuʻivakanō
- Succeeded by: Havea Tu‘iha‘angana

Member of the Legislative Assembly
- Constituency: Vavaʻu Nobles' constituency

Personal details
- Born: Fatafehi Fuatakifolaha; 12 April 1944; Kolofo'ou
- Died: August 2017
- Spouse: ‘Atilua Veikune
- Children: 5

Fatafehi Fuatakifolaha (April 1944 – August 2017), styled Lord Veikune, was a Tongan noble and politician. He held the hereditary title of lord Veikune until 2006. He was a civil servant and later a member of the Legislative Assembly. He was appointed the speaker from 1999 to 2001 and from 2005 to 2006. He lost the speakership and his noble title due to conviction for tax evasion and bribery.
