= 1999 Tongan general election =

General elections were held in Tonga on 10 and 11 March 1999 to elect members of the Legislative Assembly of Tonga. Voter turnout was 50.7%. Pro-reform candidates won a majority of seats, despite receiving fewer votes.

== Results ==
Party	Votes	%	Seats	+/–
Anti-reform candidates	40,605	60.57	4	+1
Pro-reform candidates (incl. HRDM)	26,432	39.43	5	–1
Nobles' representatives			9	0
Total	67,037	100.00	18	0
Total votes	27,867	–		
Registered voters/turnout	54,912	50.75		
Source: IPU, Nohlen et al.

=== Elected members ===
Constituency	Nobles' representatives	People's representatives
Tongatapu	Hon Lasike	ʻAkilisi Pōhiva
Tongatapu	Hon Fohe	Feleti Sevele
Tongatapu	Hon Tu'ivakano	ʻEsau Namoa
Vava'u	Hon Veikune	James W. K. Harris
Vava'u	Hon Fulivai	Samiu Vaipulu
Eua	Hon Nuku	Sunia Fili
Niuas	Lord Ma'atu	'Aisea Ta'ofi
Ha'apai	Hon Malupõ	Pita Vi
Ha'apai	Havea Tu‘iha‘angana	'Uliti Uata
