= Tonga Police =

Agency overview
- Formed: 1868; 158 years ago

Jurisdictional structure
- Operations jurisdiction: Tonga
- General nature: Civilian police

Website
- tonga-police.webflow.io

Tonga Police is the national police force of the Kingdom of Tonga.

Official records first mentioned the position of Minister of Police in 1868, which at the time was held by Kupu a Vanua Veikune who was chosen by King George Tupou I while he was still a student at Tupou College. When the Constitution of Tonga was signed in 1875, the Minister of Police was Tu’uhetoka.

The first Police Act was passed in 1891, which was updated in 1903 and replaced in 1923. A new Police Act was written in 1968 with assistance from the United Kingdom. This Act was later replaced by the Tonga Police Act 2010 which came into force on 2 February 2011. The 2010 Act separated the powers of the Minister of Police and Commissioner of Police, enshrines the philosophy of community policing, and defines the primary role of the Tonga Police.

Since Australia and New Zealand intervened in the 2006 Nukuʻalofa riots, Tonga Police have been assisted by the Australian Federal Police through the Tonga-Australia Policing Partnership (TAPP) program. Tonga Police sometimes calls upon on the resources of the Australian Federal Police and New Zealand Police. Members of the Australian Federal Police have also served as Commissioner of Tonga Police, including AFP Commander Geoff Turner who was sworn in on 12 May 2025 to serve a three-year term.

Tonga Police also has a police band known as the Royal Tonga Police Band, which was incorporated into the Tonga Police Force in 1951.

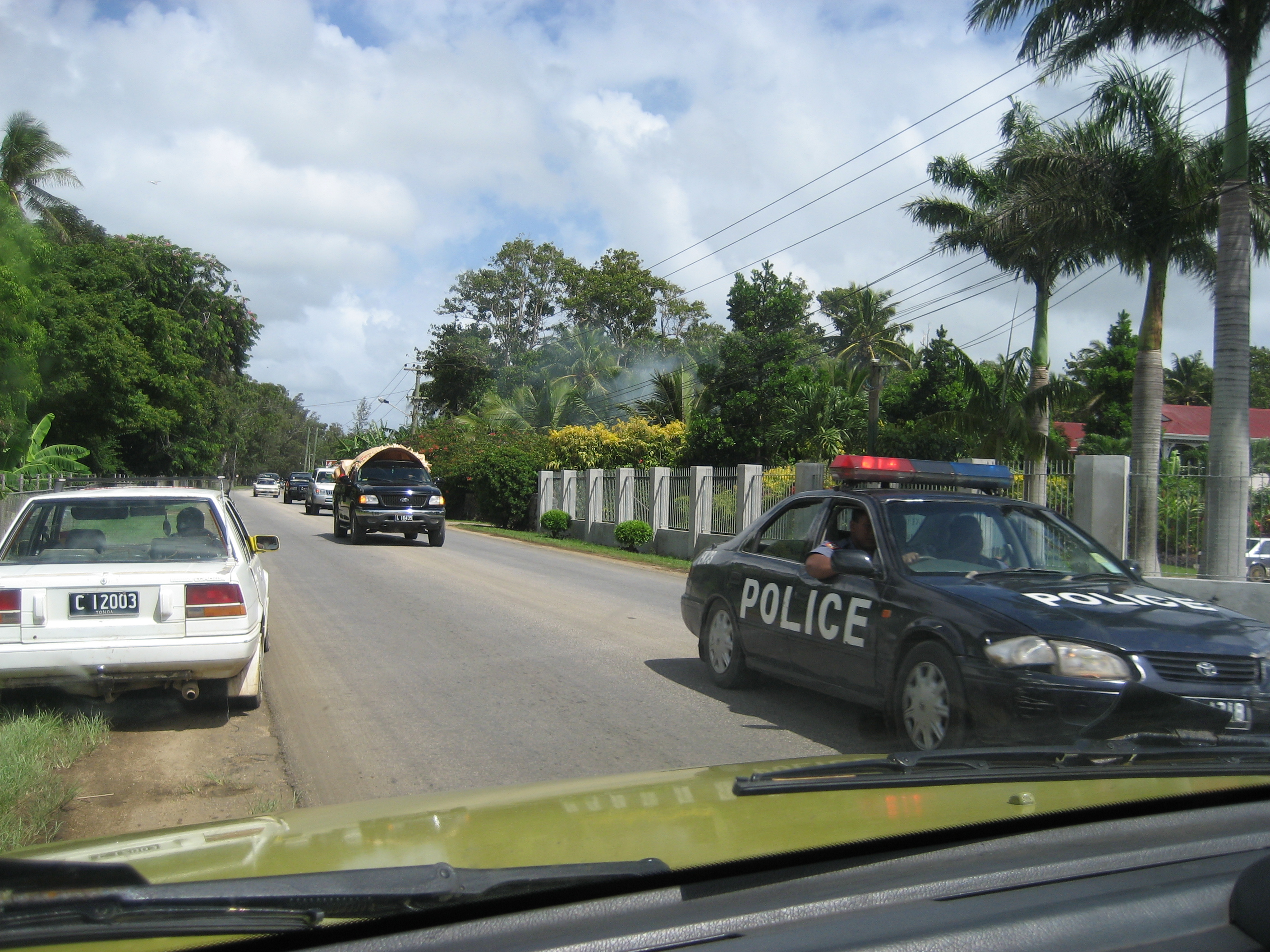
Tonga Police car ahead of funeral cortege in 2007.

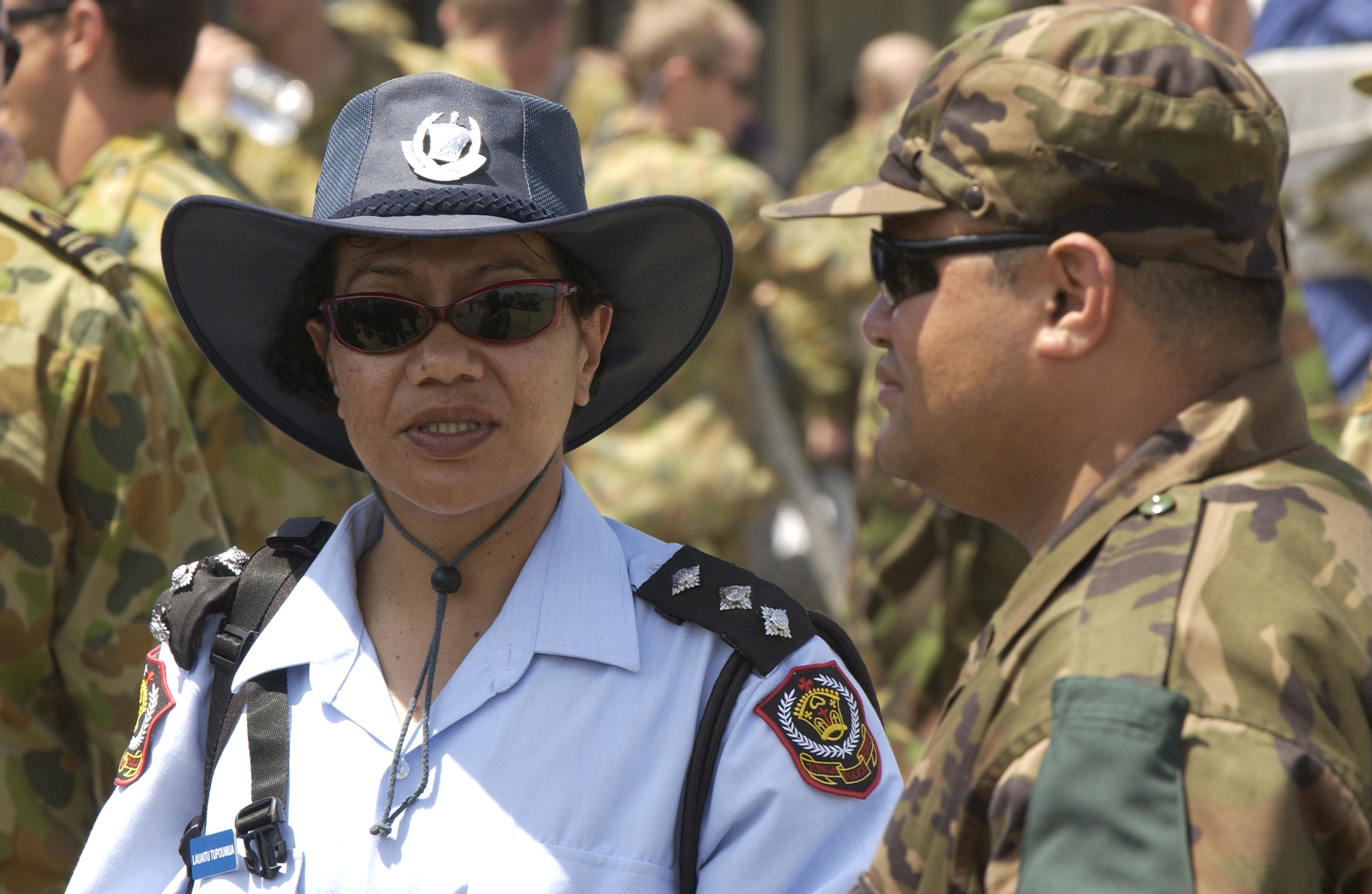
Tonga Police officer (left) in 2003.
