= 1993 Tongan general election =

General elections were held in Tonga on 3 and 4 February 1993 to elect members of the Legislative Assembly of Tonga. Nine nobles and nine people's representatives were elected. Six of the latter favoured democratic reform. Voter turnout was 59.3%.

== Results ==
Party	Votes	%	Seats	+/–
Pro-reform candidates	44,499	64.87	6	–1
Anti-reform candidates	24,102	35.13	3	+1
Nobles' representatives			9	0
Total	68,601	100.00	18	0
Valid votes	28,505	99.17		
Invalid/blank votes	238	0.83		
Total votes	28,743	100.00		
Registered voters/turnout	48,487	59.28		
Source: Nohlen et al.
