= Sione Teisina Fuko =

Tongan politician (born c. 1950)

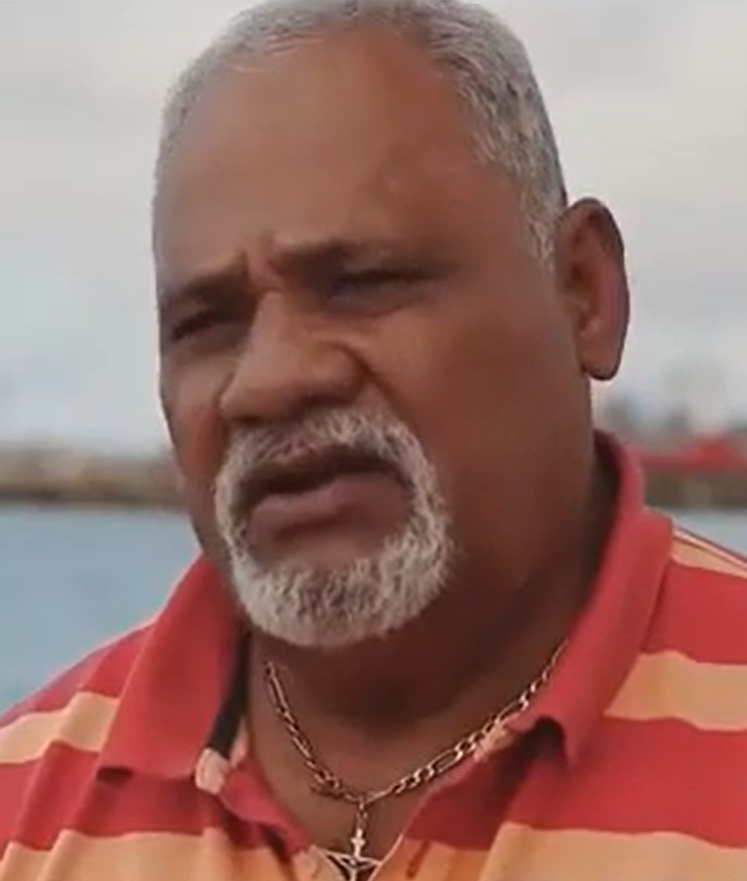
Image of Teisina Fuko

Sione Teisina Fuko (born circa 1950) is a Tongan politician and former Member of the Tongan Parliament for the island of Ha'apai. He is a member of the People's Democratic Party.

Fuko is from the village of Ha'ano on Ha'apai and was educated at Piedmont Technical College in South Carolina and later at Faith International University & Seminary in Tacoma, Washington. He worked as a schoolteacher at St Andrews High School in Nuku'alofa, before moving to the Bank of Tonga and then the Tonga Development Bank. He was first elected to Parliament in 1984.

On 15 November 2006, he gave two speeches to OBN Television and at Pangai Si'i shortly before the 2006 Nuku'alofa riots. He was subsequently charged with two counts of sedition. On 25 March 2009, he was acquitted.

In November 2009, Fuko was appointed to Cabinet as Minister for Revenue Services. Unlike previous Cabinet appointments, he was not forced to resign his seat, and continued to serve as a People's Representative.

Fuko ran for re-election in the 2010 election, in the Haʻapai 13 constituency, but was unsuccessful.
