= Parliament House, Tonga =

Seat of the Parliament of Tonga

Coordinates: 21°7′59.5″S 175°11′54.16″W

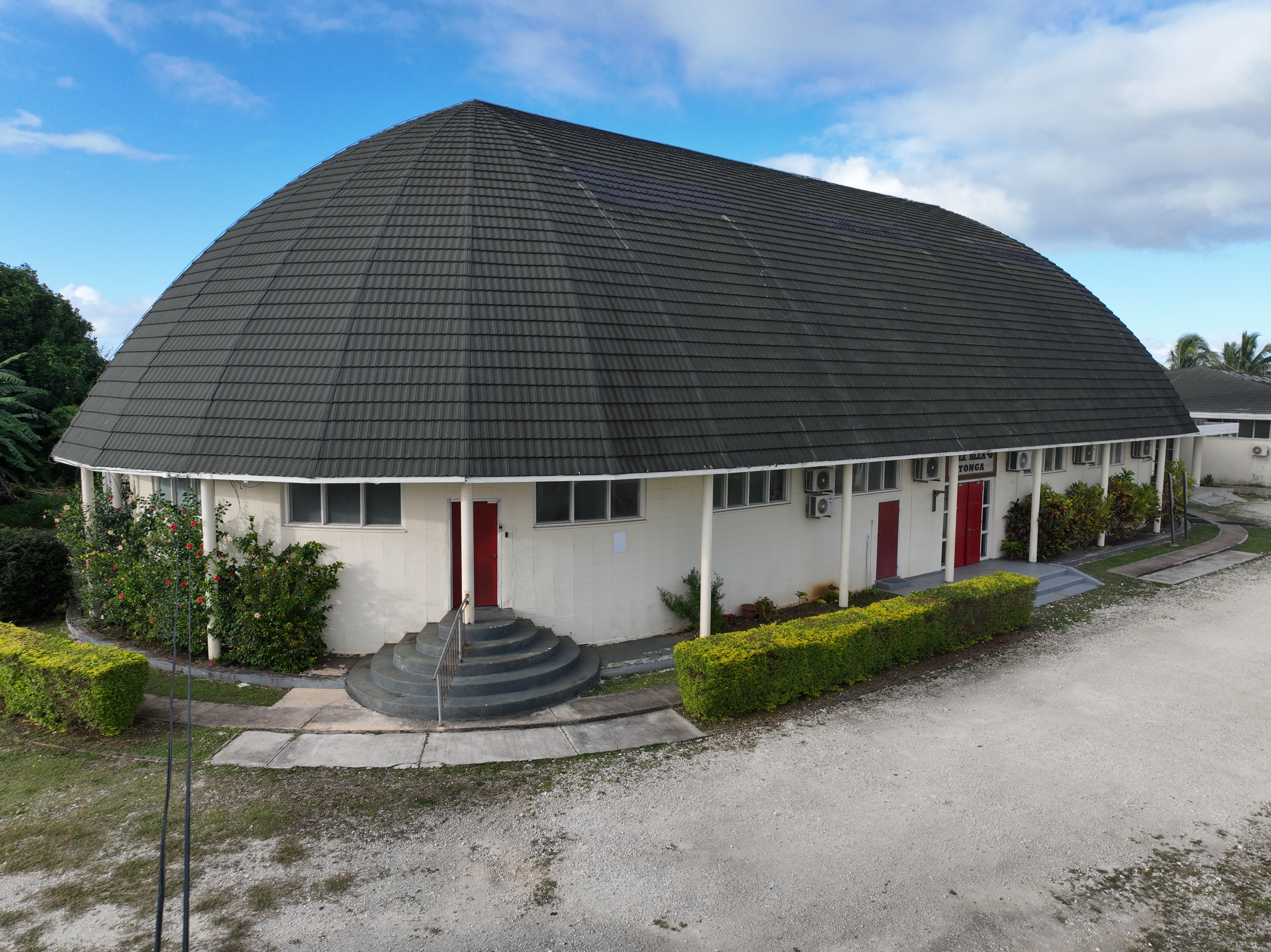
Parliament House in 2024.

Parliament House in Nukuʻalofa was the base of the Legislative Assembly of Tonga until 2018 when it was destroyed by Cyclone Gita.

== History ==
The 100-year-old Tongan Parliament House was destroyed by Cyclone Gita, a Category 4 tropical cyclone that passed through the nation on 12 and 13 February 2018. Parliament subsequently moved to the Tongan National Centre complex in Tofoa. In November 2021 the Tonga government announced that a new parliament building would be constructed on Nuku'alofa's waterfront.
