= Piukala =

Piukala is a surname. Notable people with the surname include:

- Paula Piukala, Tongan politician
- Saia Piukala, Tongan politician
- Sione Piukala (born 1985), Tongan rugby union player
