= Clive Edwards (politician) =

Tongan barrister and politician (born 1934)

William Clive Edwards OBE (born 11 January 1934) is a Tongan barrister and politician who formerly served as a Cabinet Minister and acting Deputy Prime Minister. He is a member of the People's Democratic Party.

== Life and education ==
Edwards was born in Kolofo'ou, Nuku'alofa, Tonga. He was educated at Tonga High School and Auckland Grammar School in New Zealand in 1953 where he gained NZ University Entrance. He studied law at the University of Auckland and practiced in both New Zealand and Tonga before returning to Tonga permanently in 1994.

He was appointed as an Officer of the Order of the British Empire by the New Zealand government in 1995 for services to the community.

== Political career ==
Edwards began his political career in New Zealand. He stood in the Auckland Central electorate for the National Party in the 1969 and 1972 elections. He was later elected as an Auckland City Councillor on a Citizens & Ratepayers ticket. His political career in Tonga led him to be labelled "the most detested man in the kingdom", and rumours consistently associated him with corruption, nepotism, intimidation, abuse of power and indifference to legal process.

=== Cabinet minister ===
In 1996, Edwards was appointed to the Tongan Cabinet (and therefore the Tongan Parliament) by King Taufa'ahau Tupou IV, and served as Minister of Police, Prisons and Fire Services, and acting Deputy Prime Minister. Upon taking office, he immediately warned the police that anyone who sympathised with the democracy movement should resign from the force, and warned pro-democracy campaigners that they could be tried for treason. He earned the nicknames "the royal hitman" and "the hangman" for his role in enforcing capital punishment. Edwards was an opponent of democracy, banning the Times of Tonga newspaper, ordering surveillance of pro-democracy meetings, and taking civil action suits against 'Akilisi Pohiva and other democracy activists for defamation.

In 1996 Pohiva and two Times of Tonga journalists, Kalafi Moala and Filokalafi 'Akauola, were found guilty by the Tongan Parliament of Contempt of Parliament, in a matter relating to then Minister of Justice and Attorney General, Lord Tevita Tupou published publicly by the Times, causing them to be jailed for 30 days. Edwards was responsible, in his capacity as Minister of Police and Prisons, for their incarceration. The three were later awarded US$26,000 for wrongful imprisonment. He was the Government spokesperson on all matters in relation to protecting His Majesty, Taufa'ahau Tupou IV. He was Government spokesperson on the passing of media laws which saw the Times of Tonga banned from the country in 2003 as a seditious publication, but the ban was overturned by the Supreme Court. Later in 2003 he laid a defamation complaint against the Times of Tonga after it published an article questioning his use of police housing.

In 1996 he ordered the police to visit Falisi Tupou for writing a letter to a newspaper that was critical of Edwards' contradictory viewpoints. Tupou was ordered to meet with Edwards, who shouted at Tupou for not knowing his position in society.

In 2004 Edwards was sacked from Cabinet by Prime Minister Ulukālala Lavaka Ata after the collapse of Royal Tongan Airlines. Edwards later claimed that he was unfairly sacked for opposing the government's one airline policy and for plotting to overthrow the government.

=== Member of Parliament ===
Following his sacking Edwards became a critic of the government and became a founding member of the People's Democratic Party. He contested the 2005 election, but failed to win a seat. However, he was subsequently elected as a People's Representative for Tongatapu in a by-election following the appointment of Feleti Sevele to Cabinet. As a people's representative, Edwards advocated democratic reform, and criticised the practice of appointing MPs to cabinet, arguing that it was a way for the government to silence its critics.

In 2007 Edwards was charged with two counts of sedition in relation to the 2006 Nuku'alofa riots. This was later reduced to a single charge of uttering seditious words. The trial was repeatedly delayed. Despite the charges, Edwards was re-elected at the 2008 election. Finally in May 2010, the sedition charges against him were dismissed.

In 2010, Edwards announced that he would be promoting a private members bill to abolish whipping and the death penalty.

Edwards stood for the seat of Tongatapu 3 in the 2010 elections, but was unsuccessful. Following the election, he was appointed to Cabinet as a minister outside the legislature, holding the portfolios of public enterprise and revenue services. On 1 September 2011, he was appointed Minister for Justice. He retained the portfolio for public enterprises, while the portfolio for revenue services was reshuffled to Sunia Manu Fili.

Edwards stood for the seat of Tongatapu 3 in the 2014 election, but was unsuccessful.
