= Cyclone Gita =

Strong tropical cyclone which affected Tonga

Severe Tropical Cyclone Gita
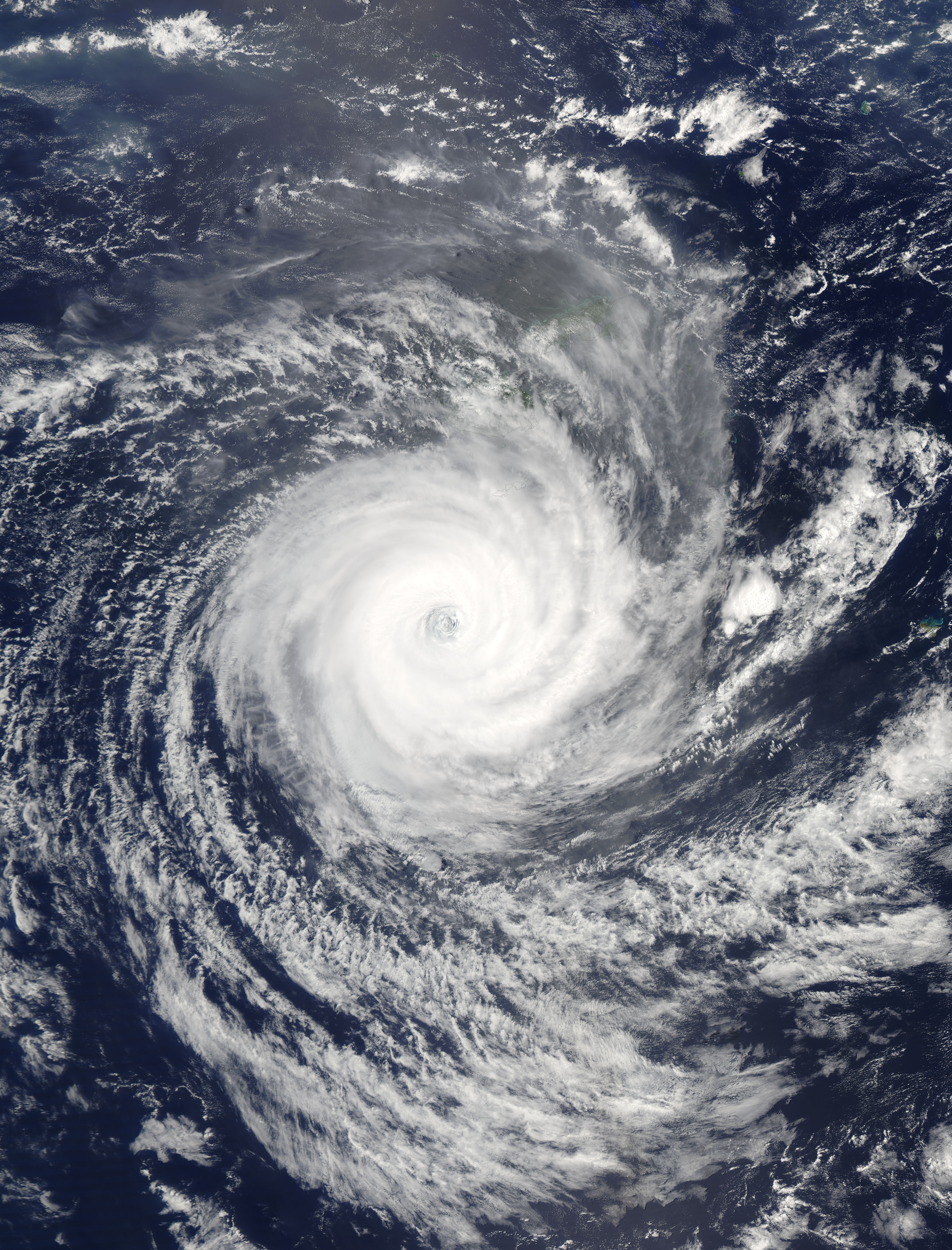
- Cyclone Gita at peak intensity south of Fiji on 14 February

Meteorological history
- Formed: 3 February 2018
- Extratropical: 19 February 2018
- Dissipated: 22 February 2018

Category 5 severe tropical cyclone
- 10-minute sustained (FMS)
- Highest winds: 205 km/h (125 mph)
- Lowest pressure: 927 hPa (mbar); 27.37 inHg

Category 4-equivalent tropical cyclone
- 1-minute sustained (SSHWS/JTWC)
- Highest winds: 230 km/h (145 mph)
- Lowest pressure: 937 hPa (mbar); 27.67 inHg

Overall effects
- Fatalities: 1
- Damage: $253 million (2018 USD)
- Areas affected: Vanuatu, Fiji, Wallis and Futuna, Samoa, American Samoa, Cook Islands, Niue, Tonga, New Caledonia, Queensland, New Zealand
- IBTrACS
- Part of the 2017–18 South Pacific cyclone season

Severe Tropical Cyclone Gita was the most intense tropical cyclone to impact Tonga since reliable records began. The second named storm and first major tropical cyclone of the 2017–18 South Pacific cyclone season, Gita originated from a monsoon trough that was active in the South Pacific in early February 2018. First classified as a tropical disturbance on 3 February, the nascent system meandered near Vanuatu for several days with little development. After acquiring a steady east trajectory near Fiji, it organized into a Category 1 tropical cyclone on 9 February near Samoa. Arcing south in a clockwise turn, the system rapidly intensified, and became a severe tropical cyclone on 10 February near Niue.

Throughout its path in the South Pacific, Cyclone Gita affected multiple island nations and territories. Tonga was the hardest-hit, with severe damage occurring on the islands of Tongatapu and ʻEua; two fatalities and forty-one injuries occurred in the kingdom. At least 171 homes were destroyed and more than 1,100 suffered damage. Violent winds destroyed homes and left the two islands largely without power. Torrential rains and damaging winds caused widespread disruptions in Samoa and American Samoa, prompting emergency declarations in both. Outlying islands in the Fijian Lau Islands were significantly affected, particularly Ono-i-Lau and Vatoa. Wallis and Futuna, Niue, and Vanuatu were also affected, but impacts in those areas were minor. Total damage from Gita is estimated to be in excess of US$252 million, primarily in American Samoa and Tonga.

== Meteorological history ==
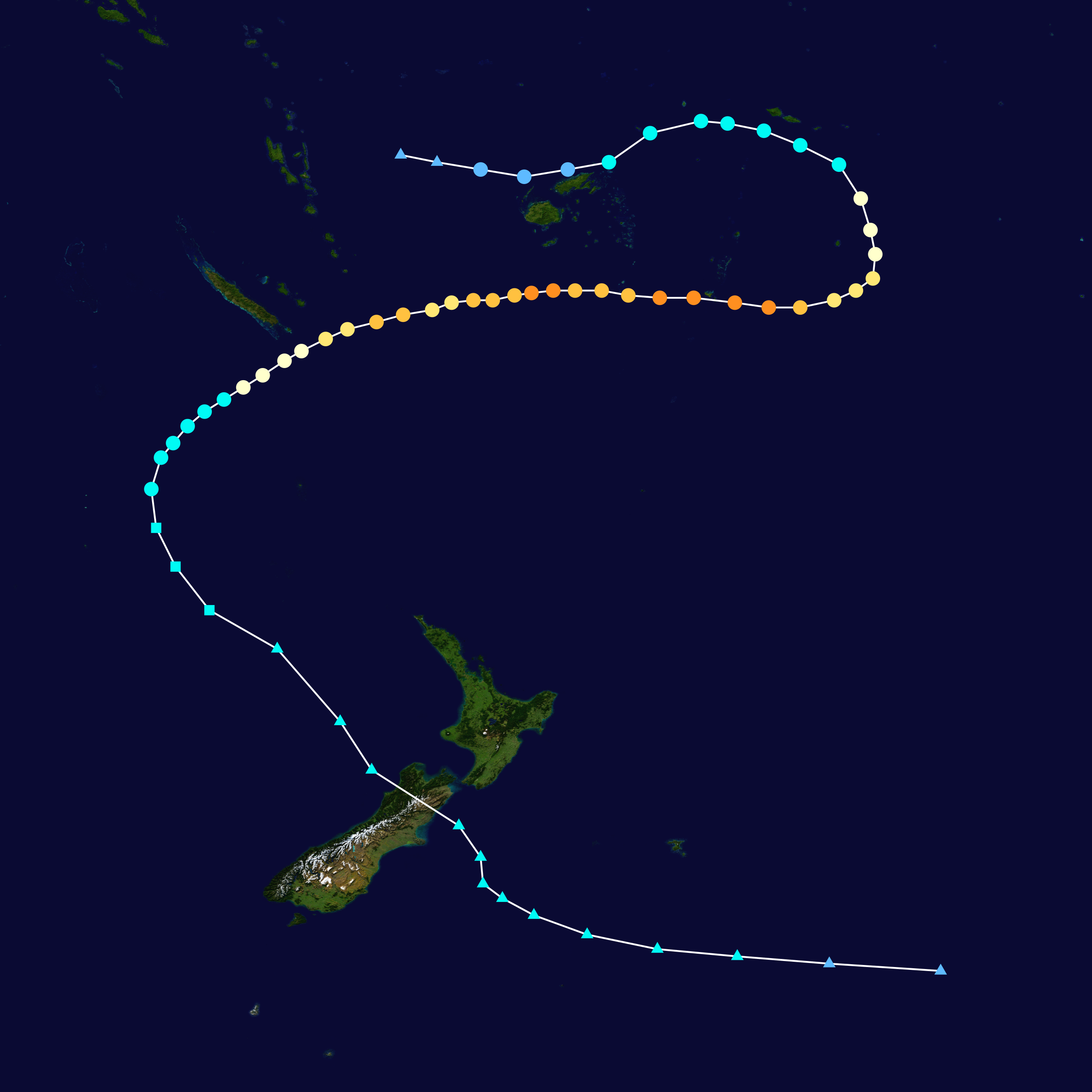
Map plotting the storm's track and intensity, according to the Saffir–Simpson scale Map key Saffir–Simpson scale Tropical depression (≤38 mph, ≤62 km/h) Tropical storm (39–73 mph, 63–118 km/h) Category 1 (74–95 mph, 119–153 km/h) Category 2 (96–110 mph, 154–177 km/h) Category 3 (111–129 mph, 178–208 km/h) Category 4 (130–156 mph, 209–251 km/h) Category 5 (≥157 mph, ≥252 km/h) Unknown Storm type Tropical cyclone Subtropical cyclone Extratropical cyclone, remnant low, tropical disturbance, or monsoon depression

On 3 February, the Fiji Meteorological Service (FMS) started to monitor Tropical Disturbance 07F, which had developed within a trough of low pressure, about 435 km (270 mi) to the southeast of Honiara in the Solomon Islands. The system was poorly organized and was located along an upper-level ridge of high pressure, in an area of high vertical wind shear. Over the next couple of days, the system moved erratically near northern Vanuatu and remained poorly organized, with convection located to the south of the low-level circulation center. The system subsequently started to move south-eastwards, towards the Fijian Islands and a favorable environment for further development, on 5 February. The system subsequently passed near the island nation during 8 February, where it developed into a tropical depression and started to move north-eastwards towards the Samoan Islands. During 9 February, the United States Joint Typhoon Warning Center (JTWC) initiated advisories on the system and designated it as Tropical Cyclone 09P, after an ASCAT image showed that it had winds of 65–75 km/h (40–45 mph) in its northern semicircle. The FMS subsequently named the system Tropical Cyclone Gita early, after the United States National Weather Service Weather Forecast Office in Pago Pago requested that the system be named early for warning and humanitarian reasons.

After Gita was named, a prolonged period of rapid intensification ensued as it quickly intensified into a Category 1 tropical cyclone on the Australian tropical cyclone intensity scale, before it passed within 100 km (60 mi) of Samoa and American Samoa. After moving past the Samoan Islands, Gita turned southeast, then southwards, under the influence of a near-equatorial ridge to the northeast. On 10 February, Gita rapidly intensified to a category 3 severe tropical cyclone on the Australian scale while traversing anomalously warm sea surface temperatures of between 28–29 °C (82–84 °F). The system bypassed Niue to the east during this intensification phase. On 11 February, Gita continued to intensify into a category 4 severe tropical cyclone. At the same time, Gita turned westward under the influence of a subtropical ridge to the south. Around 12:00 UTC on 12 February, the cyclone passed near or over the Tongan islands of ʻEua and Tongatapu as a high-end Category 4 severe tropical cyclone. At this time, maximum 10-minute sustained winds were estimated at 195 km/h (121 mph) making Gita the strongest cyclone to strike the nation since reliable records began. The JTWC estimated the system to have reached its overall peak intensity at this time as a Category 4-equivalent on the Saffir-Simpson scale with 1-minute sustained winds of 230 km/h (140 mph).

At 18:00 UTC on 13 February, Gita reached its peak strength approximately 205 km (127 mi) south of Kandavu, Fiji, as a Category 5 severe tropical cyclone with ten-minute sustained winds of 205 km/h (127 mph), gusts to 285 km/h (177 mph), a minimum pressure of 927 mbar (hPa; 27.37 inHg).

== Impact ==
Gita impacted the Pacific island nations and territories of Vanuatu, Fiji, Wallis and Futuna, Samoa, American Samoa, Cook Islands, Niue, Tonga, New Caledonia, and New Zealand, with the most significant damage being reported in the Samoan Islands and Tonga. Owing to the cyclone's significant and widespread impact, the name Gita was retired following its usage and will never be used for a South Pacific tropical cyclone again.

Effects of Cyclone Gita by country and territory
Country / Territory	Deaths	Injuries	Damage (USD)	Ref.
American Samoa	0	0	$52–200 million	
Australia	1 (Note: Search and rescue operations were suspended on 21 February 2018 for a missing swimmer in Queensland.)	0	None	
Cook Islands	0	0	Minor	
Fiji	0	0	$606,000	
New Caledonia	0	0	Minor	
New Zealand	0	0	$26.1 million	
Niue	0	0	None	
Samoa	0	0	$10 million	
Tonga	2	33	$164.1 million	
Vanuatu	0	0	—N/a	
Wallis and Futuna	0	0	Minor	
Total	3	33	$252.8–400.8 million	

=== Samoa ===
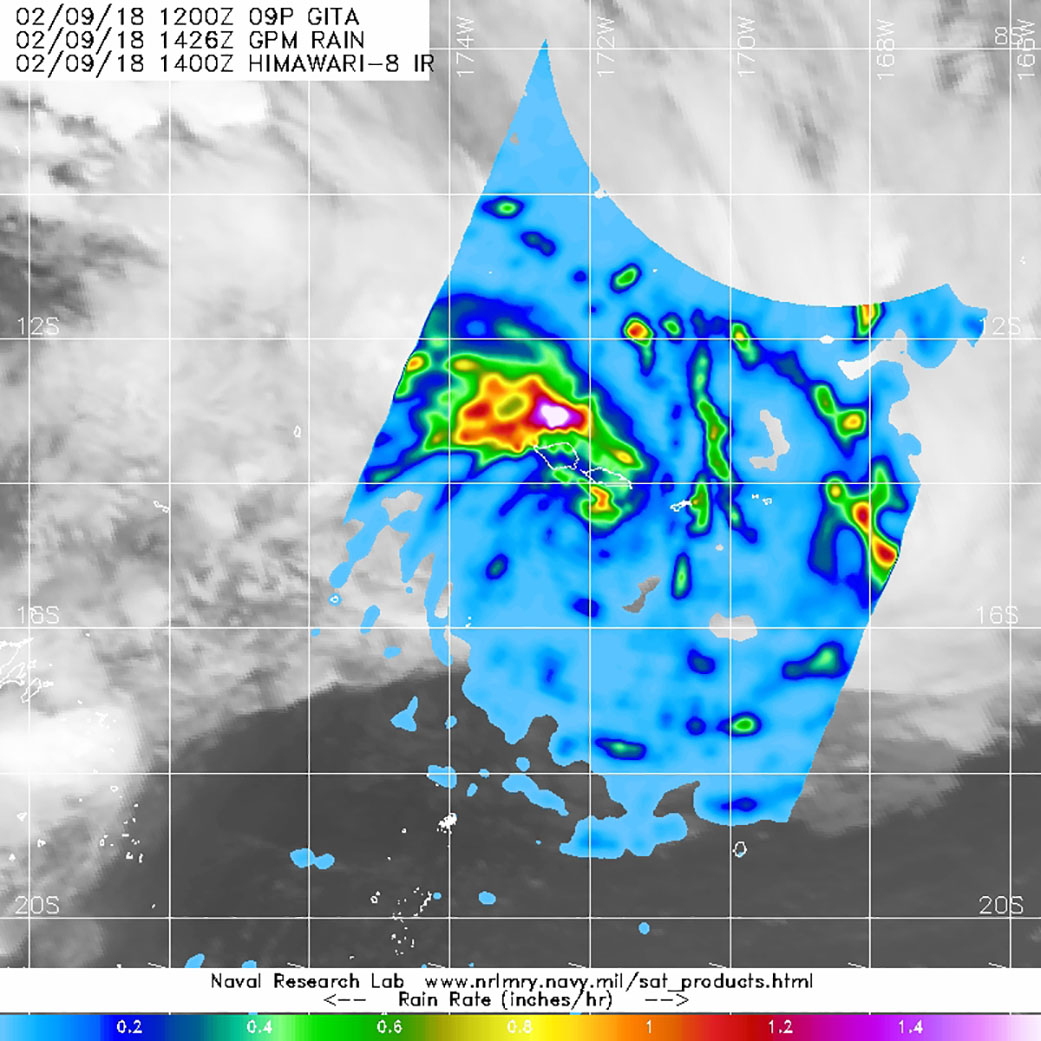
Global Precipitation Measurement satellite image of Gita near the Samoan islands on 9 February. Heavy rain bands with rainfall rates of 25 to 41 mm (1 to 1.6 in) per hour were identified near the islands.

Gita brought torrential rain to parts of Samoa on 8–9 February. Accumulations averaged 150–250 mm (5.9–9.8 in) across the country, peaking at 320 mm (13 in) along the eastern slops of Mount Le Pu'e on Upolu. Storm-force winds impacted the nation, reaching 99.7 km/h (62.0 mph) at Faleolo International Airport and 98.2 km/h (61.0 mph) in Apia. Multiple rivers in the city burst their banks and inundated homes. At least 233 people sought refuge in emergency shelters. Landslides and flooding rendered many roads impassable. Communications were briefly lost with the southern coast of Upolu. A state of disaster was declared for the nation on 10 February. Damage to the power grid reached $10 million. No casualties were reported nationwide.

=== American Samoa ===
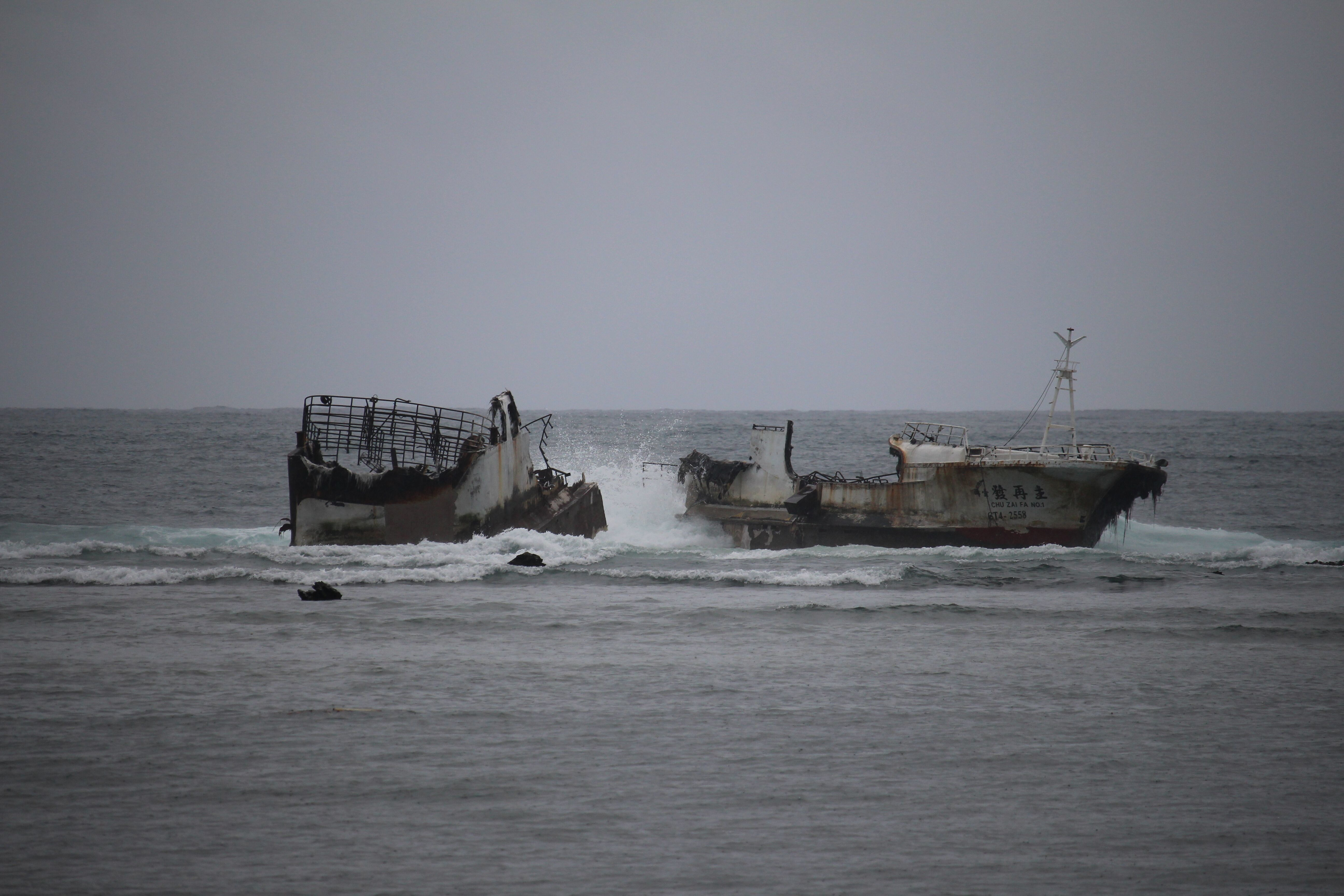
The Taiwanese fishing vessel Chui Kai Fa No. 1 grounded off the coast of Tutuila

On 8 February, the National Weather Service (NWS) office in Pago Pago issued a tropical storm watch, a high surf advisory, and a flash flood watch for all of American Samoa as the nascent cyclone approached the territory. With Tropical Depression 08F existing simultaneously to the south of Fiji, uncertainty existed in the exact track of Gita. However, NWS Forecasters emphasized the risk of flash floods and mudslides as the interaction of two cyclones led to persistent monsoonal flow across the region. In the two days preceding Gita's arrival, this monsoon trough produced significant rains, reaching 432 mm (17.0 in). Monsoonal rains continued for two days after Cyclone Gita, and the flash flood watch was finally discontinued on 12 February. The American Samoa Emergency Management Agency advised residents to "remain on alert and secure loose items as necessary". The tropical storm watch was soon upgraded to a warning, indicating the expected arrival of gale-force winds within 36 hours. Pago Pago International Airport suspended operations for the duration of the storm. The NWS discontinued the tropical storm warning late on 9 February as Gita moved away from the territory.

Cyclone Gita reached American Samoa on 9 February, bringing heavy rains and strong winds from 4:00 a.m. to 2:00 p.m. local time. The strongest winds were recorded at the NOAA Earth System Research Laboratory Office in Cape Matatula on Tutuila; sustained values reached 119 km/h (74 mph) and gusts peaked at 157 km/h (98 mph). These winds tore roofs of structures and downed trees and power lines across the territory, with the most severe damage reported in Nuʻuuli and Tafuna. Approximately 90 percent of the island was left without power and water and nearly 1,000 people required evacuation. The NWS Office lost power; the Honolulu, Hawaii, office issued forecasts in the interim. Rainfall in Pago Pago exceeded 155 mm (6 in). Flash floods and mudslides occurred territory-wide, with valleys and low-lying areas being most affected. Multiple streams flooded and prompted evacuations in Malaeloa village. Landslides were reported in Avau, Amanave, and Poloa. Approximately 3,000 people reported damage to their crops. Destruction of banana, papaya, and breadfruit crops temporarily limited the availability of food. At the American Samoa National Park, every trail closed.

Offshore, the cargo ship Uila o le Sami sank near Taʻū during the storm. Approximately 300 yd (270 m) off Leone Bay, the Taiwanese-flagged fishing vessel Chui Kai Fa No. 1 grounded on 5 February and split in half. The vessel was previously adrift in international waters following a fire on 4 November 2017. The grounding of the Chui Kai Fa No. 1 prompted the closure of the port of Pago Pago until 11 February. The vessel contained an estimated 13,000–30,000 US gal (49,000–114,000 L) of diesel fuel and a light oil sheen was reported in the area. Inclement weather produced by Cyclone Gita impeded response efforts by the United States Coast Guard.

An assessment by the American Samoa Public Works in March 2018 determined that Cyclone Gita destroyed 387 homes, inflicted major damage to more than 1,300 homes, and damaged a further 1,600. The American Samoa Department of Commerce estimated that half of the territory's population suffered some form of property loss and placed total damage at US$200 million. A 2019 report by the American Samoa Economic Forecast calculated combined direct and indirect losses at US$186 million. The National Centers for Environmental Information calculated a lower damage total of US$52 million. In contrast to the scale of damage, no fatalities or injuries were reported.

Costliest South Pacific Ocean tropical cyclones
Rank	Tropical cyclones	Season	Damage USD	Refs
1	3 Gabrielle	2022–23	$9.2 billion	
2	TD 06F	2022–23	$1.43 billion	
3	5 Winston	2015–16	$1.4 billion	
4	5 Harold	2019–20	$768 million	
5	5 Pam	2014–15	$543 million	
6	5 Judy and Kevin	2022–23	$433 million	
7	4 Val	1991–92	$381 million	
8	5 Lola	2023–24	$352 million	
9	4 Evan	2012–13	$313 million	
10	4 Gita	2017–18	$253 million	

On 10 February, a Coast Guard AC-130 conducted aerial surveys of the territory and a small group of Federal Emergency Management Agency (FEMA) personnel were deployed. By 18 April, almost 100 federal personnel were deployed to the territory. United States President Donald Trump declared a state of emergency for American Samoa on 11 February. The United States Army Reserve assisted FEMA and the American Red Cross with the deployment of personnel and distribution of relief supplies. Furthermore, the Army Reserve Pago Pago facility was converted into a staging area for the disaster response. The United Nations Development Programme initiated a US$100,000 response plan on 16 February to support the local governmental response. President Trump later declared the territory a major disaster area on 2 March. Following this declaration, the Internal Revenue Service announced that residents could apply for tax exemptions. Health officials advised residents to boil water amid an enhanced risk of dengue fever. StarKist Samoa donated US$50,000 to the American Samoa Government on 16 March. On 9 April 2019, Representative Nita Lowey (D-NY) introduced the Additional Supplemental Appropriations for Disaster Relief Act, 2019 (H.R. 2157) bill to the 116th Congress. The bill, signed into law by President Trump on 6 June, provided just over US$17.2 billion for disaster recovery nationwide; of this US$18 million was allocated for American Samoa and made available through February 2020. However, distribution of these funds was delayed and Governor Lolo Matalasi Moliga urged the United States Department of Agriculture to expedite the process. Through March 2021, FEMA provided US$31,198,512.50 in financial assistance: $20,543,787.44 in individual funds, US$9,763,391.26 for public assistance, and US$891,333.80 for a hazard mitigation program. A further US$40 million was provided through the Small Business Administration, intergovernmental agreements, disaster grants, and private distributions.

A prolonged downturn in the territory's tuna industry in the decade preceding Gita led to an economic recession. The nationwide reconstruction efforts and the influx of money in the wake of the cyclone spurred slight growth of the American Samoa economy, reflecting in the gross domestic product increasing by 2.2 percent in 2018, and a pause in the recession. This economic stimulation quickly subsided and American Samoa's economy contracted in 2019.

=== Tonga ===
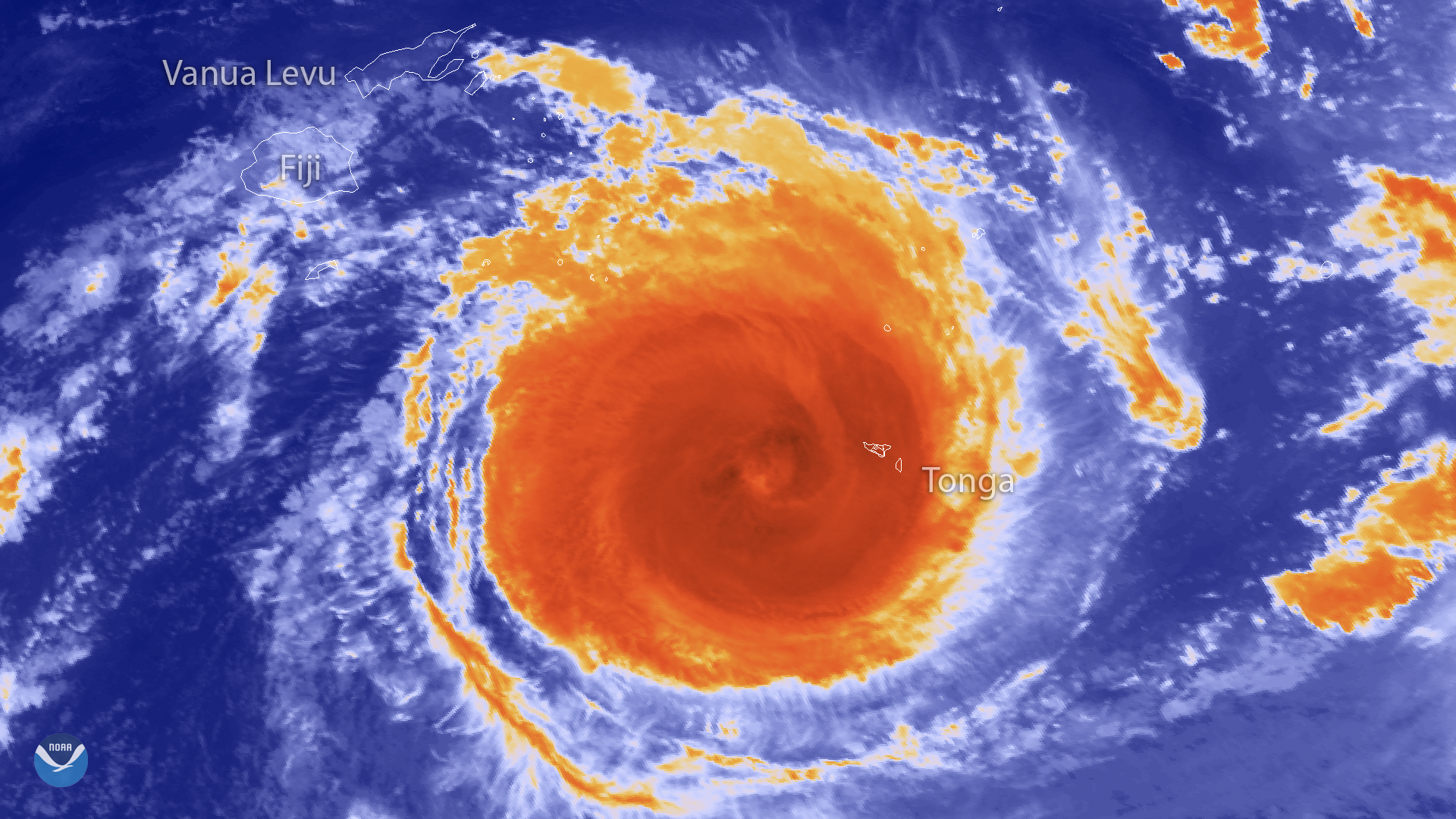
Enhanced infrared satellite image of Gita off the coast of Tonga on 12 February

Prior to and during the cyclone, approximately 5,700 residents sought refuge in public shelters. Power was turned off prior to the storm's arrival. Striking Tonga on 12 February, Cyclone Gita brought destructive winds to the capital island of Tongatapu. Initial surveys across the island revealed 119 homes destroyed and another 1,131 damaged, primarily in Nukuʻalofa. Many areas were left without water and power. Many structures lost their roof during the height of the storm. Older structures suffered the greatest damage, including the Tongan Parliament building, built more than 100 years ago, which was flattened by the storm. Fuaʻamotu International Airport sustained damage, along with the domestic terminal, prompting officials to keep the airport closed. Across Tongatapu, 3 people suffered major injuries while another 30 experienced minor injuries. An elderly woman died while trying to find shelter after her home was destroyed. One person died from a heart attack potentially related to the storm in Fuaʻamotu.

On the neighboring island of ʻEua, the storm knocked out power to all residents and caused extensive damage. Similar to Tongatapu, older structures suffered severe damage while newer buildings fared well. Crops were largely destroyed. Fifty-two homes were completely destroyed on the island; eight people suffered injury, including one severe. Total damage were estimated at T$356.1 million (US$164.1 million), including a NZ$20 million (US$14.5 million) damage to the power grid.

Immediately following the storm, a curfew was imposed for all of Tonga. Personnel from His Majesty's Armed Forces rescued people during the storm and began clearing roads at daybreak on 13 February. National Emergency Management Office spokesman Graham Kenna called the storm "the worst situation [he has] been in" during his 30-year career. MP Lord Fusituʻa described the impact as the worst since at least Cyclone Isaac in 1982. India provided US$500,000 humanitarian aid to Tonga under UNOSSF. On 13 February, Australia provided A$350,000 (US$275,000) in emergency supplies via the Royal Australian Air Force (RAAF) to assist more than 2,000 people. Australia also sent humanitarian supplies to the Tongan Red Cross. Two civilian humanitarian specialists were deployed to assist Tonga's National Emergency Management Office. A medical expert also provided assistance to assess health infrastructure. New Zealand provided NZ$750,000 (US$544,000) in assistance.

=== Fiji ===
During Gita's formative states on 6–8 February, the depression brought heavy rain and gusty winds to northern Fiji resulting in some flooding. Accordingly, the FMS issued alerts for these hazards across the affected regions. Rainfall reached 108 mm (4.3 in) in Udu Point on 6 February.

On 13 February, the center of Gita passed roughly 60 km (37 mi) south of Ono-i-Lau in the Lau Islands of Fiji. Observations from the island revealed peak sustained winds of 135 km/h (84 mph) with gusts to 190 km/h (120 mph). Twenty-four hour rainfall reached 270.7 mm (10.66 in), greatly contributing to the island experiencing its wettest February on record; the monthly total was 887.9 mm (34.96 in). Flooding from tidal surge preceded the core of the cyclone by several hours. Structural damage was reported in Doi Village, including one home that lost its roof. Communications with Ono-i-Lai and nearby Vatoa were disrupted for roughly a day. Across both islands, 10 homes were destroyed and 26 more sustained damage. Many structures sustained roof damage and crops were devastated. Local leaders on Ono-i-Lau called the storm the "worst in living memory". Damage to the nation were at FJ$1.23 million (US$606,000).

=== New Caledonia ===
On 16 February, the New Caledonia branch of Météo-France issued a level 1 hurricane alert for the Isle of Pines, southeast Grande Terre. This was soon raised to level 2, prompting the closure of schools and businesses across the municipality. In advance of the storm, most tourists visiting Isle of Pines were evacuated to Nouméa; however, many stayed to ride out the storm. Municipal buildings were opened to the public as shelters. Domestic flights at Nouméa Magenta Airport were suspended during the storm's passage. Offshore, removal operations of the grounded cargo ship Kea Trader—situated over Récif Durand about 220 km (140 mi) east of Nouméa—were suspended with workers repositioned to Nouméa. The two broken halves of the ship were ballasted to minimize movement in the expected rough seas. The cyclone ultimately had little effect across the territory; some damage to vegetation and marinas was reported.

=== Australia ===
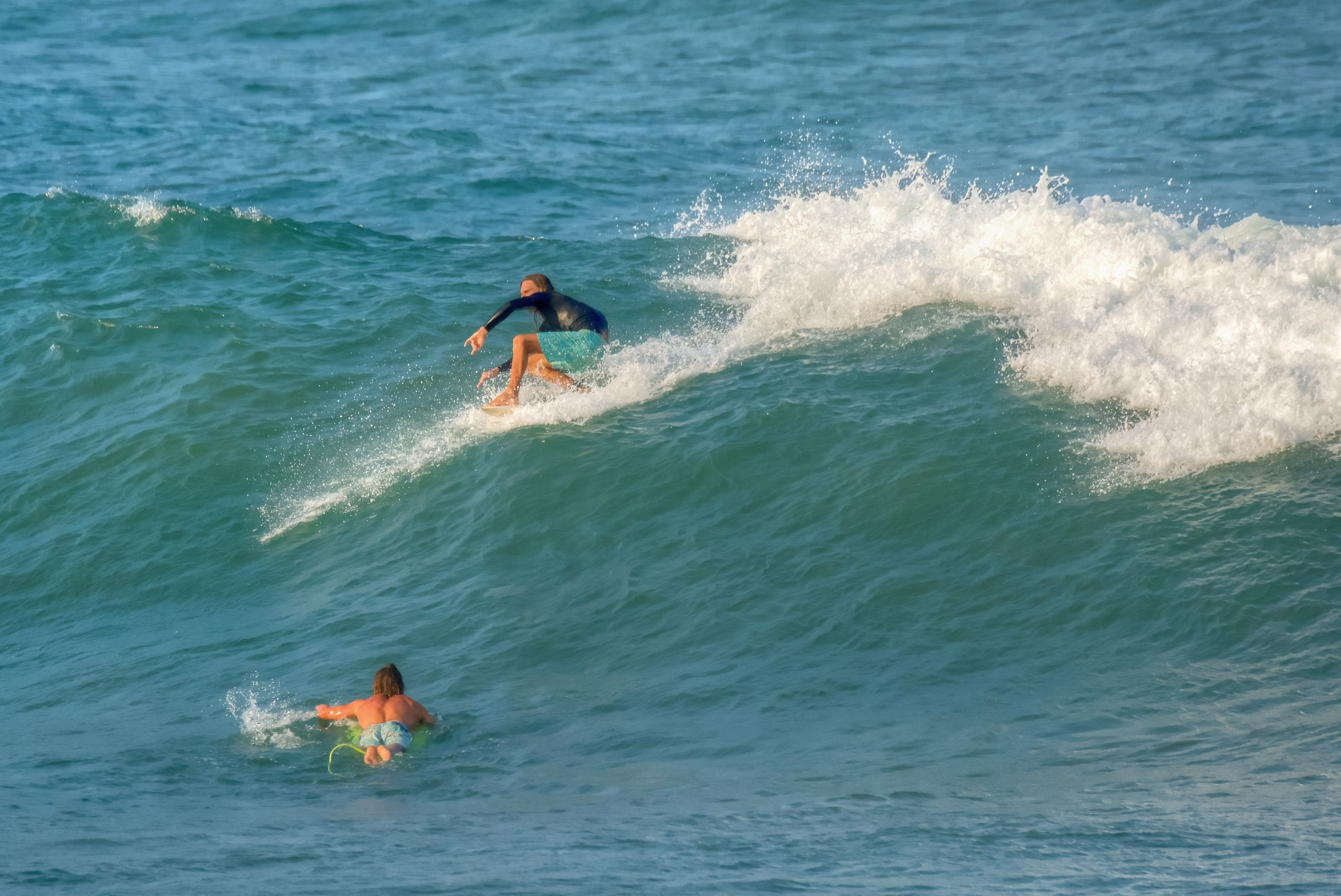
Large swells along Queensland coastline attracted surfers

While located nearly 1,000 km (620 mi) east of Queensland on 17 February, large swells propagating from the cyclone impacted Australia's Pacific beaches. Conditions remained hazardous through 19 February. Surf was largest from Gold Coast to Sydney, with peak swells of 6 m (20 ft) at Tweed Heads and 4.5 m (15 ft) at Palm Beach. Surf Life Saving Queensland closed all beaches between North Kirra and Southport. Although most people heeded warnings and closures, some "thrillseekers" surfed and used jet skis. One person required rescue in the Jumpinpin Channel. A surfer and swimmer were pulled from dangerous rip currents at Burleigh and Mooloolaba, respectively. Off Nambucca Heads, New South Wales, one person was pulled out to sea by rip currents on 17 February. Surf Life Saving New South Wales stated that rescue operations shifted to recovery the following day as there had been "a significant amount of time since this gentleman disappeared". Helicopters conducted aerial surveys on 19 February to assist local police and rescuers. Search and rescue operations were ultimately suspended on 21 February without success. Two people were rescued off the coast of Manly when their boat sank amid 2 m (6.6 ft) swells. Throughout New South Wales, authorities conducted dozens of rescues.

=== New Zealand ===
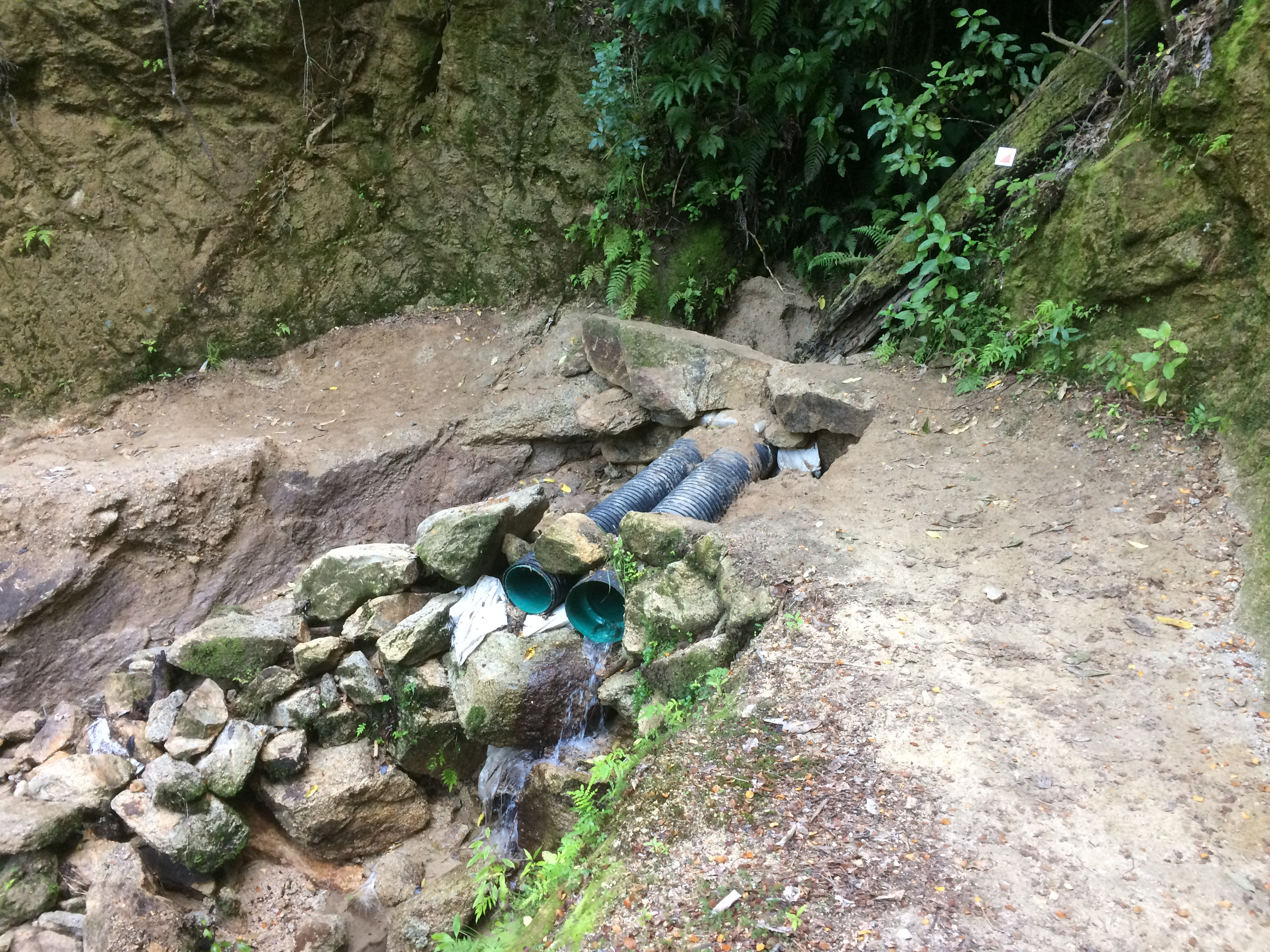
A culvert washed out in the Kaiteriteri Mountain Bike Park

As Cyclone Gita threatened to hit New Zealand as a strong ex-tropical cyclone, New Zealand's MetService issued heavy rain warnings and strong wind warnings covering a wide expanse of the country. Campers, hikers, and boaters in the Marlborough Sounds were told to evacuate, and residents there were warned that communications could be cut off by the storm. Several schools in the region of Nelson were closed, while in the West Coast, schools in the districts of Buller and Grey were closed. Air New Zealand cancelled a number of flights on 20 February.

As Gita bore down on the South Island, bringing floods and strong winds, a state of emergency was eventually declared on 20 February. Total insured losses across New Zealand reached NZ$35.6 million (US$26.1 million). In Taranaki, Gita resulted in NZ$4.5 million (US$3.1 million) worth of damage. A tree fell on a water main near the water treatment plant south of New Plymouth, leaving 10,000 homes without water for 3 days and 26,000 homes on a boil water notice for 7 days.

=== Other nations ===
As Gita's precursor tropical disturbance impacted Vanuatu's Torba province during 6 February, the Vanuatu Meteorology and Geo-hazards Department warned that heavy rainfall, thunder and lightning would impact the area and advised people to take extra precautions. Additional alerts were raised on 15–16 February as Gita tracked southeast of the nation. Between 8 and 9 February, the system brought strong winds and heavy rain to Wallis and Futuna. Some power outages were reported on Wallis, though overall effects were negligible. On 8 February, weather alerts were issued for Niue as Gita approached from the northeast. The cyclone bypassed the island to the southeast the following day with minimal effects. Sustained winds at Niue International Airport reached 40 km/h (25 mph) with gusts to 64 km/h (40 mph).

== See also ==
- Weather of 2017 and 2018
- Tropical cyclones in 2017 and 2018
- Cyclone Ofa (1990)
- Cyclone Hina (1997)
- Cyclone Waka (2001)
- Cyclone Heta (2003)
- Cyclone Ian (2014)
- Cyclone Winston (2016)
