= Human Rights and Democracy Movement =

- Leader: ‘Uliti Uata
- Founded: 1970s (informal); 1992 (formal)

The Human Rights and Democracy Movement (HRDM) is a political party in Tonga. Its leader is Uliti Uata. It states its ideology to be democracy, social justice, opposition to corruption, and women's rights.

The HRDM was founded in the late 1970s as an informal group of Tongans interested in democratic reform. It was formalised in 1992 as the Pro-Democracy Movement, and contested several elections under that name. In October 1998, it changed its name to the Human Rights and Democracy Movement.

In November 1992 the then-Pro-Democracy Movement held a constitutional convention which discussed the structure and history of the Constitution of Tonga and compared it to arrangements overseas. A follow-up convention was held in 1999, but this was less successful.

At the 1999 elections, candidates aligned with the HRDM gained five seats in the Legislative Assembly of Tonga. The results were a disappointment for the HRDM, which had expected to win at least seven seats.

At the 2002 elections, supporters of the HRDM won seven of the nine seats reserved for commoners. At the 2005 elections they also won seven seats, and following the election HRDM-aligned People's Representatives Feleti Sevele and Sione Haukinima were appointed to Cabinet. Sevele later became the first commoner to serve as Prime Minister of Tonga.

At the 2008 elections, the HRDM won only 4 seats.

In the leadup to the 2010 elections several members of the HRDM, including longstanding MP 'Akilisi Pohiva founded the Democratic Party of the Friendly Islands as an explicit electoral vehicle.
