= Viliami Veasiʻi Veikune =

Tongan noble and politician

Viliami Veasiʻi Veikune, styled Lord Tuʻihaʻateiho is a Tongan noble, politician, and Member of the Legislative Assembly of Tonga. He is the 15th person to hold the Tuʻihaʻateiho title, and was appointed to it on 5 June 2004.

He grew up and was educated in Hawaii & Alaska.

He served for a time as Chairman of the Tonga Body Builders Association.

Tuʻihaʻateiho was elected as a noble representative for Ha'apai in the 2005 and 2008 elections. He was re-elected in the 2010 elections.

In December 2010 Tuʻihaʻateiho was charged with possession of an illegal firearm. If convicted, he would lose his seat in Parliament. Before his trial, however, Parliament adopted an amendment to the Arms and Ammunition Act, lessening the potential sentence that he faced (and which Lord Tuʻilakepa was facing on a similar charge), so that if convicted he would nonetheless retain his seat in Parliament. The Democratic Party of the Friendly Islands, which had opposed the amendment, asked King George Tupou V to veto it, which he did.

Lord Tuʻihaʻateiho appeared before a magistrate's court on 11 June 2012. His counsel was fellow MP Siosifa Tuʻutafaiva. Following conviction, he was sentenced on 6 March 2015 to a 2,400 pa'anga fine.

On 2 July 2012, following Lord Tuʻiʻafitu's resignation from the position of Deputy Speaker of the Legislative Assembly to become Minister for Health, Lord Tu‘iha‘teiho became Deputy Speaker in his place.

== Honours ==
National honours

- Order of the Crown of Tonga, Commander (31 July 2008).
