= Havea Tuʻihaʻangana =

Tongan noble and politician

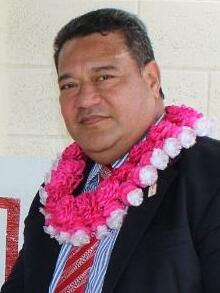
- Tuʻihaʻangana in 2019

Speaker of the Tongan Legislative Assembly
- In office 10 February 2006 – 2008
- Preceded by: Lord Veikune
- Succeeded by: Lord Tuʻilakepa

Member of Parliament for Haʻapai Nobles' constituency
- Incumbent
- Assumed office 27 November 2014
- Preceded by: Fatafehi Fakafanua
- In office 1991 – 23 April 2008
- Succeeded by: Hon. Tuʻipelehake

Havea Tuʻihaʻangana, styled Lord Tuʻihaʻangana, is a Tongan noble and politician. He was Speaker of the Tongan Legislative Assembly from 2006 to 2008.

Tuʻihaʻangana was first elected to the Legislative Assembly of Tonga as a noble representative for Haʻapai in 1991. In February 2006 he was appointed Speaker, replacing Lord Veikune following his conviction on tax evasion and bribery charges. He lost his seat at the 2008 election. Following his election loss he was appointed Governor of Haʻapai.

He was re-elected in the 2014 election. During this term he opposed the government of ʻAkilisi Pōhiva, tabling a no-confidence motion in 2017.

He was re-elected again by the nobles in the 2017 election, and in 2021.

== Honours ==
National honours

- Order of Queen Sālote Tupou III, Grand Cross (31 July 2008).
