= Malakai Fakatoufifita =

Tongan noble and politician

The Honorable Lord Tuʻilakepa
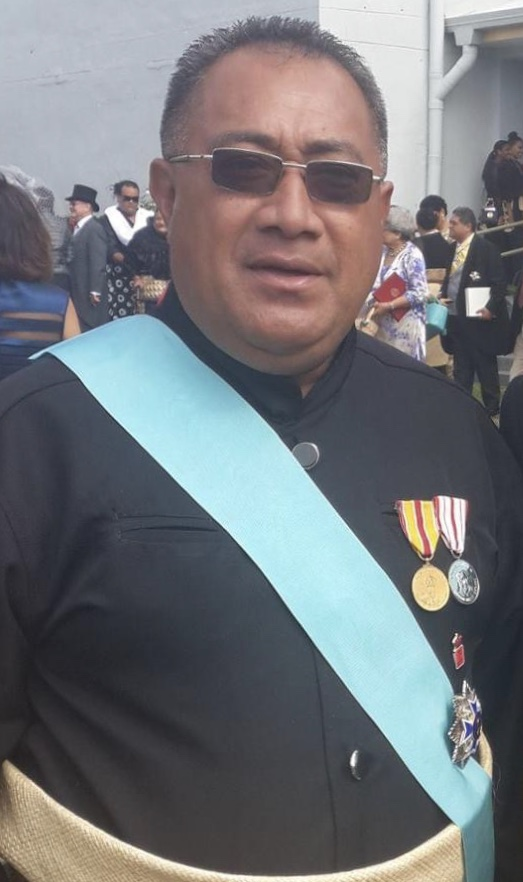
- Lord Tuʻilakepa in 2015
- Born: Malakai Fakatoufifita
- Citizenship: Tongan
- Education: Liahona High School
- Occupations: Politician, Nobleman
- Years active: (1977–present)
- Employer: Kingdom of Tonga
- Parent(s)

Noble representative for Vavaʻu
- Incumbent
- Assumed office 2005
- Monarch: Tupou VI
- Preceded by: Lord Veikune

Speaker of the Tongan Legislative Assembly
- In office 29 April 2008 – 3 December 2010
- Monarch: Tupou VI
- Preceded by: Hon. Havea Tui'ha'angana
- Succeeded by: Lord Tupou of Kolofo'ou

Malakai Fakatoufifita, styled Lord Tuʻilakepa, is a Tongan noble, politician, and Member of the Legislative Assembly of Tonga.

Fakatoufifita was educated at Liahona High School in Tonga and in the USA.

== Political career ==
He was appointed the 15th holder of the Tu'ilakepa title in 1977, with the estates of Talasiu in Tongatapu and Ofu, Okoa and Vasivasi in Vavaʻu.

Fakatoufifita worked as a civil servant for the Ministry of Lands, Survey and Natural Resources before entering politics. He was first elected to the Legislative Assembly as a noble representative for Vavaʻu in the 1993 election, serving for one term. He was re-elected in 2005, and subsequently in 2008 and 2010.

In April 2008, he was appointed Speaker of the Tongan Legislative Assembly by King George Tupou V. His term ended when he was charged on 3 December 2010 on firearms charges.

In September 2019, after the death of the incumbent PM, he was appointed Minister for Agriculture and Fisheries.

== Arrest ==
On 3 December 2010 he was arrested on firearms charges following a series of drug raids across the country. On 9 December 2010 he was charged with two counts of possession of an illegal firearm, two counts of possession of illegal ammunition, and one count of possession of an illegal drug, and released on bail. If convicted, he would lose his seat in Parliament. Before his trial, however, Parliament adopted an amendment to the Arms and Ammunition Act, lessening the potential sentence that he faced (and which Lord Tuʻihaʻateiho was facing on a similar charge), so that if convicted he would nonetheless retain his seat in Parliament. The Democratic Party of the Friendly Islands, which had opposed the amendment, asked the King to veto it. In January 2012, the King vetoed the amendment bill.

In December 2011, it was reported that in 2010 he had allegedly been bribed by a Colombian drug syndicate to facilitate the trafficking of cocaine into Australia via Tonga. It was revealed that in a tapped phone conversation members of the syndicate had asked Tuʻilakepa to help one of them, a convicted drug trafficker, obtain a visa to enter Tonga. Tuʻilakepa wrote to the Tongan Immigration Department to sponsor the man's visa application, saying that he would "take full responsibility for him during the duration of his stay", and vouching that the Colombian was "an honest, trustworthy and law-abiding person".

In January 2012, he appeared in court, on six firearms and illicit drugs charges; the case was adjourned. In February 2013, the Crown prosecution service withdrew the drugs charges, as evidence had reportedly been obtained via illicit means (phone-tapping). Four firearms charges remained. In February 2015, he was convicted on the firearms charges, and fined 12,000 pa'anga.

In August 2025 he was suspended from parliament for five days after getting into a brawl with Paula Piukala.
