= People's Democratic Party (Tonga) =

Former political party in Tonga

- President: Teisina Fuko
- Founded: 8 April 2005
- Split from: Human Rights and Democracy Movement

The People's Democratic Party (PDP) was a political party in Tonga. It was formed after a split in the Human Rights and Democracy Movement. The party was founded on 8 April 2005 in 'Atenisi. Teisina Fuko was the first person elected to the party presidency at a meeting on 15 April 2005. Former Police Minister Clive Edwards was also a founding member of the party.

The PDP was legally registered on 1 July 2005, being the first Tongan party to do so.

The president of the party announced in 2009 that the party would contest each seat in the 2010 election. However, the party has not won any seats to the Tongan Parliament. It is currently inactive without any candidates or Members of Parliament.

== See also ==
- Category:People's Democratic Party (Tonga) politicians
