= Constitution of Tonga =

Supreme law of Tonga

The Constitution of Tonga is supreme law under which the Government of Tonga operates. It was enacted by King George Tupou I on 4 November 1875. The 1875 constitution formally unified Tonga and established a monarchy and landed nobility in Tonga. The constitution codified practice and principles that sustained the ruling class, incentivizing powerful chiefs to agree to the new constitution.

The 1875 constitution was influenced by Hawaiian and British constitutional development and largely drafted by Shirley Waldemar Baker, an Australian missionary in Tonga. Baker obtained a copy of the 1864 Constitution of the Hawaiian Kingdom from Edward Reeve, a representative of the Hawaiian government.

The constitution stipulates the makeup of the Tongan Government and the balance between its executive, legislature, and judiciary. The anniversary of its passage is celebrated annually as Tonga's Constitution Day. The constitution is separated into three parts. Part one is a declaration of rights of the Tongan people. Part two addresses the form of government. Part three provides laws for land ownership, succession, and sale.

The Declaration of Rights provides for the basic human rights of the people of Tonga. It firstly established Tonga as a free nation. It prohibits slavery except as a form of punishment for a great crime and establishes Tonga as a haven for those who have escaped slavery in a foreign nation. It establishes equal law for all citizens of Tonga despite their class or ethnicity. The constitution provides the freedoms of worship, press, speech, petition, and assembly as well. It establishes a Sabbath day on Sunday during which no trade or professional or commercial undertakings are to be pursued. It applies the writ of Habeas Corpus to its people and provides for the basic rights of the accused, such as protection from double jeopardy. It establishes a national tax in return for protection of life, liberty, and property. It holds soldiers equally accountable to civil law. It establishes the qualifications to be selected as a juror and establishes an age of maturity for the inheritance of title or land. Finally, it states that any foreigner who has lived in Tonga for at least 5 years may take an oath of allegiance and become a naturalized citizen, granted all the same rights and privileges of natural-born Tongans except for the right of hereditary tax allotments.

Tonga is a semi-constitutional monarchy in which the King exercises executive power through his Cabinet. Legislative power is vested in the Legislative Assembly. The King can legislate through the Privy Council when the Assembly is not in session, but such ordinances must be subsequently confirmed by the Assembly to become law.

The constitution can be amended by the Legislative Assembly, provided this does not affect the "law of liberty", the monarchical succession, or the titles or estates of the nobles. Amendments must pass the Legislative Assembly three times, and be unanimously supported by the Privy Council.

== See also ==
- Flag of Tonga
