= Tongan nobles =

Nobility of the Kingdom of Tonga

There are 33 traditional noble titles in the modern Kingdom of Tonga. They are all estate holders. Twenty titles were established by Siaosi Tupou I with the Constitution of 1875. In 1880, he added 11 more. Tupou II created the titles Lasike in 1894 and Veikune in 1903. Sālote Tupou III created the title of Tupoutoʻa in 1921. In the beginning, it was forbidden for a noble to have more than one title. Later, this was made possible.

Some of the great chiefs who missed out on a noble's title (in 1910) were among others: ʻAlipate Mafileʻo of Kolomotuʻa, SA Sipu of Kolomotuʻa, Iki Lolohea of Haʻapai (but later inherited the Fulivai), Tēvita Tapueluelu of Vavaʻu, SF Tafolo, Tēvita Ula Afuhaʻamango of Vavaʻu, Siosiua Niutupuʻivaha Kaho (but later inherited the Tuʻivakanō).

These unacknowledged chiefs were still lords in the traditional sense. However, their influence slowly decreased with each passing generation. Queen Sālote acknowledged this in some of her public speeches by paying respect to the chiefs then a separate respect to the Nobles of the Crown as: "Highly respectful for the Chiefs is also Highly respectful for the nobles in this land".

In the 21st century, King George Tupou V created eight new noble titles but with no hereditary lands. The title is to remain with the holder for the rest of their life and is considered equivalent to the United Kingdom's practice of appointing life peers.

- Ramsay Robertson Dalgety (July 2008)
- Tevita Poasi Tupou (July 2008)
- Taniela Tufui (July 2008 – deceased)[
- Matoto of Tuʻanekivale (30 December 2010)
- Tangi of Vaonukonuka (30 December 2010)
- Feleti Sevele ʻo Vailahi (30 December 2010)
- Madraiwiwi Tangatatonga (4 January 2011 – deceased)
- Sonatane Tuʻa Taumoepeau-Tupou (28 March 2011 – deceased)
