= Democratic Party of the Friendly Islands =

Political party in Tonga

Democratic Party of the Friendly Islands Paati Temokalati ʻa e ʻOtu Motu ʻAngaʻofa
- Abbreviation: PTOA
- Founder: ʻAkilisi Pōhiva
- Founded: September 2010
- Split from: Human Rights and Democracy Movement
- Ideology: Reformism
- Political position: Big tent
- Legislative Assembly: 0 / 26

The Democratic Party of the Friendly Islands (Tongan: Paati Temokalati ʻa e ʻOtu Motu ʻAngaʻofa, PTOA), also referred to as the Democrats, is a political party in Tonga. The party's leader at its foundation was ʻAkilisi Pohiva.

The party was launched in September 2010, and included several sitting People's Representatives who were part of the Human Rights and Democracy Movement. Its objectives upon foundation included government transparency and economic reform. The PTOA failed to win any seats at the 2025 general election, marking the first time the party was left without parliamentary representation.

The "Friendly Islands" are a name originally given to Tonga by Captain James Cook.

== 2010 elections ==
The party contested all 17 people's seats in the 2010 elections, winning 12 of them. Following the election, it secured the support of one independent and was seeking the support of two others – 'Aisake Valu Eke and Sunia Fili – by offering them cabinet posts.

Following the elections, Niuas MP Sosefo Feʻaomoeata Vakata reportedly quit the party to become an independent and support a noble candidate as Prime Minister.
