= Legislative Assembly of Tonga =

National legislature of Tonga

Legislative Assembly of Tonga Fale Alea ʻo Tonga

Type
- Type: Unicameral

History
- Founded: 16 September 1875

Leadership
- Speaker: ʻAlipate Tuʻivanuavou Vaea since 15 December 2025
- Prime Minister: Fatafehi Fakafānua since 18 December 2025

Structure
- Seats: 27
- Political groups: Independents (27): People's Representatives (17); Ex officio member (1); Nobles' Representatives (9)

Elections
- Voting system: Single non-transferable vote
- Last election: 20 November 2025
- Next election: By 2029

Meeting place
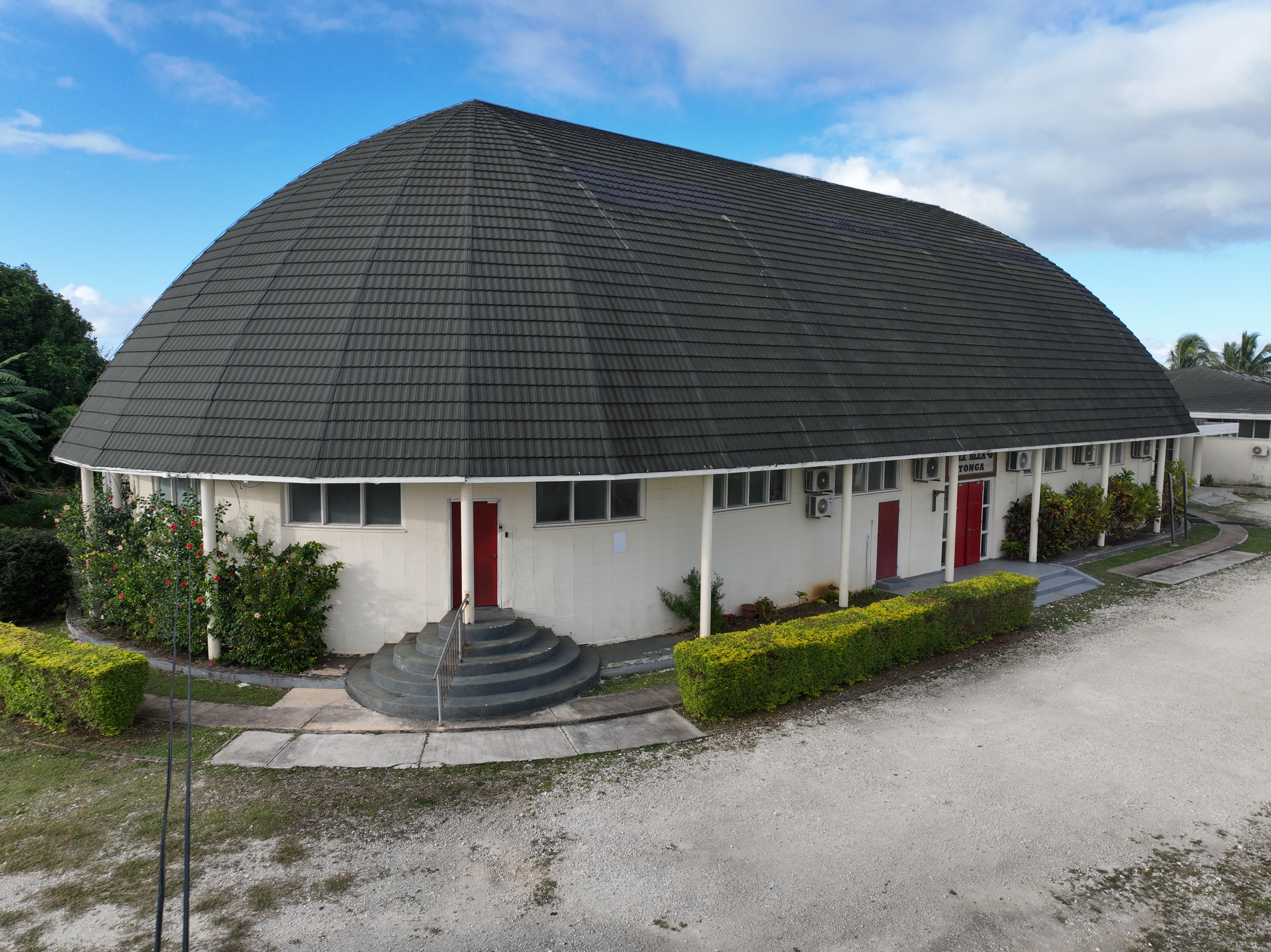
- Parliament House, Nukuʻalofa

Website
- parliament.gov.to

The Legislative Assembly of Tonga (Tongan: Fale Alea ʻo Tonga) is the unicameral legislature of Tonga.

== History ==
A Legislative Assembly providing for representation of nobles and commoners was established in 1862 by King George Tupou I. This body met every four years and was continued in the 1875 Constitution.

Originally the Legislative Assembly consisted of all holders of noble titles, an equal number of people's representatives, the governors for Haʻapai and Vavaʻu, and at least four Cabinet Ministers chosen by the monarch. An increase in the number of nobles from twenty to thirty saw the Assembly grow to 70 members. Amendments in 1914 saw a reduction in the size of the Assembly and annual sittings. The principle of equal representation of nobles and commoners was retained.

In April 2010 the Legislative Assembly enacted a package of political reforms, increasing the number of people's representatives from nine to seventeen, with ten seats for Tongatapu, three for Vavaʻu, two for Haʻapai and one each for Niuas and ʻEua.

The 100-year-old Tongan Parliament House was destroyed by Cyclone Gita, a Category 4 tropical cyclone that passed through the nation on 12 and 13 February 2018. Parliament subsequently moved to the Tongan National Centre complex in Tofoa. In November 2021 the Tongan government announced that a new parliament building would be constructed on Nukuʻalofa's waterfront.

== Electoral system ==
The assembly has 26 members, in which 17 members are elected by the people for 5-year term in single-seat constituencies via the single non-transferable vote system. The other 9 members are elected by the 33 hereditary nobles of Tonga.

== Speaker of the Assembly ==
The Legislative Assembly is presided over by a Speaker, who is elected by majority of the elected members of Parliament at the first meeting after the general election and constitutionally appointed by the king. Prior to 2010, the Speaker was appointed by the monarch.

A complete list of the Speakers is below:

Name	Took office	Left office	Notes
Hon. Viliami Tungī	1875	1896	
Hon. Siaosi Tukuʻaho	1897	1897	
Hon. Siaosi Tuʻipelehake	1897	1912	
Hon. Finau ʻUlukalala	1912	1938	
Hon. Iosaiasi Veikune	1939	1940	1st term
Hon. Tuʻivakanō	1941	1941	1st term
Hon. Nuku	1942	1944	
Hon. Iosaiasi Veikune	1945	1945	2nd term
Hon. Tuʻivakanō	1946	1948	2nd term
Hon. Iosaiasi Veikune	1949	1949	3rd term
Hon. Tuʻivakanō	1950	1950	3rd term
Hon. Kalaniuvalu	1951	1958	
Hon. Maʻafu Tukuiʻaulahi	1959	1984	
Hon. Kalaniuvalu Fotofili	1985	1986	
Hon. Malupo	1987	1989	
Lord Fusituʻa	1990	1998	
Lord Veikune	April 1999	2001	1st term
Lord Tuʻivakanō	1 July 2002	2004	1st term
Lord Veikune	22 March 2005	January 2006	2nd term
Lord Tuʻihaʻangana	10 February 2006	April 2008	
Hon. Tuʻilakepa	2 May 2008	2010	
Lord Tupou (interim)	3 December 2010	21 December 2010	
Hon. Lasike	21 December 2010	18 July 2012	
Lord Fakafānua	19 July 2012	29 December 2014	1st term
Lord Tuʻivakanō	January 2015	December 2017	2nd term
Lord Fakafānua	December 2017	15 December 2025	2nd term
Lord Vaea	15 December 2025		

== Terms of the Tongan Legislative Assembly ==
Until 2010, the government was appointed by the monarch without reference to Parliament, and there were no political parties. The last term under the old system was the 2008 Tongan Legislative Assembly. Political reform in 2010 saw the Prime Minister elected by Parliament from among its members, leading to responsible government.

Term	Elected in	Government
2010 Parliament	2010 election	Independent
2014 Parliament	2014 election	No overall majority
2017 Parliament	2017 election	PTOA
2021 Parliament	2021 election	Independent

== Officers ==
Clerk (Kalake Pule Fale Alea ʻo Tonga)

- Sione Tekiteki (2011–2012)
- Gloria Poleʻo (2012–present)

== See also ==
- Politics of Tonga
- List of legislatures by country
