= Langi Kavaliku =

Tongan scholar and politician

Deputy Prime Minister of Tonga
- In office 22 August 1991 – 2000
- Prime Minister: Baron Vaea ʻAhoʻeitu ʻUnuakiʻotonga Tukuʻaho
- Preceded by: Baron Vaea
- Succeeded by: Tevita Poasi Tupou

Minister of Education
- In office 1966–2000
- Prime Minister: Fatafehi Tuʻipelehake; Baron Vaea ʻAhoʻeitu ʻUnuakiʻotonga Tukuʻaho
- Succeeded by: Tutoatasi Fakafanua

Personal details
- Born: 1939
- Died: 3 December 2008 (aged 68–69)

Senipisi Langi Kavaliku (1939 – 3 December 2008), styled The Hon. Hu’akavameiliku, was a Tongan scholar and politician. He served as a Cabinet Minister for 35 years, and was Deputy Prime Minister of Tonga in the 1990s. He was the first Tongan to obtain a master's degree and a PhD. He was also the estate holder of the village of Ha'asini.

== Early life ==
Hu'akavameiliku was educated at Harvard University, graduating with a Bachelor of Arts, before obtaining a Master of Arts from the University of Cambridge. In 1966 he completed a PhD from Victoria University of Wellington, with a thesis was on "Educational reorganization for national development in Tonga".

== Political career ==
Shortly after graduating he was appointed to Cabinet as Minister Without Portfolio. In early 1968 he was appointed acting Minister of Finance while Mahe 'Uli'uli Tupouniua was seeking medical treatment in New Zealand. In 1969 he was serving as Minister of Education and Works. In 1969 he was granted the royal chiefly title of Hu'akavameiliku. He served as pro-chancellor of the University of the South Pacific from 1976 to 1981, and again from 2000 - 2006.

He served as deputy prime minister for over 20 years. He retired from politics in 2000. Following the 2005 Tongan public service strike he was appointed to the National Committee for Political Reform which recommended a transition to democracy.

== Death ==
On 3 December 2008, he was killed in a car accident when his car struck a mound of rocks.

== Family ==
Sempisi Langi Kavaliku was born as the eldest son of the late Honourable Kavaliku (Sione Ma'afu Kavaliku) and Lady Ana Pulotu Kavaliku. Sempisi Langi was the eldest of 7 children which consisted of himself The Hon. Hu'akavameiliku, Hon. Fane Pulu Kavaliku Moala, Hon. Veisinia Fa Kavaliku Pasikala, Hon. Popi Kavaliku, Mele Tokilupe Kavaliku Talanoalelei, Funaki Kavaliku, Losaline Ngaluafe Kavaliku Finau, and Dawson Kavaliku.

Sempisi Langi Kavaliku was bestowed the Royal Chiefly title of Hu'akavameiliku by His Late Majesty King Tupou IV as the title was to be bestowed on his father Sione Ma'afu but refused it as he was already The Honourable Kavaliku, so the title was bestowed upon his heir thus Dr Sempisi Langi Kavaliku was styled The Honourable Hu'akavameiliku of Ha'asini.

Hon. Hu'akavameiliku married Lady Fuiva Kavaliku and had many children in their care.

His son Siaosi Sovaleni is the current Prime Minister of Tonga.
