= Tapueluelu =

Tapueluelu is a surname. Notable people with the surname include:

- Mateni Tapueluelu (fl. 2013), Tongan journalist
- Semisi Tapueluelu (born 1949), Tongan politician
