= Niua 17 =

Electoral constituency in Tonga

- Constituency for the Legislative Assembly of Tonga
- Region: Niuas

Current constituency
- Created: 2010
- Number of members: 1
- Party: Independent
- Member: ‘Aminiasi Tangimana (elect)

Niua 17 is an electoral constituency for the Legislative Assembly in the Kingdom of Tonga. It was established for the November 2010 general election, when the multi-seat regional constituencies for People's Representatives were replaced by single-seat constituencies, electing one representative via the first past the post electoral system. It encompasses the entirety of the Niua island group, for which it is the sole constituency. (The number does not mean that it is the seventeenth in the Niuas, but in the country.) Thus, although it is technically a newer constituency, it corresponds exactly to the former Niuas constituency, which also elected a single representative.

Its first ever representative is Sosefo Fe‘aomoeata Vakata, an independent first time MP. Vakata stood as a candidate for the Democratic Party of the Friendly Islands in the 2010 general election, and defeated the incumbent MP for the Niuas, independent member Sione ʻIloa. Barely two weeks after the election, however, Vakata announced that he was leaving the party, and would henceforth sit as an independent, so that he could support a noble, rather than DPFI leader ʻAkilisi Pohiva, for the premiership. He was subsequently appointed Minister for Youth, Training, Employment and Sports. Vakata lost the seat to Vatau Hui in 2017, Hui was re-elected in 2021, but lost the seat in a landslide to Lataifaingataʻa Tangimana in 2025. Tangimana retained the seat until the Supreme Court voided his election in 2026 after finding him guilty of election bribery, and vacated the seat in July. His son, ‘Aminiasi Tangimana, won the subsequent by-election, held on 8 October.

== Members of Parliament ==
Election	Member	Party
2010	Sosefo Vakata	Democratic Party of the Friendly Islands
(resignation from party, 8 December 2010)	Sosefo Vakata	Independent
2014	Sosefo Vakata	Independent
2017	Vatau Hui	Democratic Party of the Friendly Islands
2021	Vatau Hui	Independent
2025	Lataifaingataʻa Tangimana	Independent
2026 by-election	‘Aminiasi Tangimana	Independent

== Election results ==
=== Elections in the 2020s ===
2026 by-election
Candidate	Party	Votes	%
‘Aminiasi Tangimana	Independent	435	55.70
Sitīveni Selui	Independent	144	18.44
Paea Filimoehala	Independent	138	17.67
Sione Tuifio Hui	Independent	50	6.40
ʻAisake Hoatatau Finau	Independent	14	1.79
Total		781	100.00
Valid votes		781	100.00
Invalid/blank votes		0	0.00
Total votes		781	100.00
Registered voters/turnout		1,316	59.35
Source: Matangi Tonga, TEC (turnout)

2025 general election
Candidate	Party	Votes	%
Lataifaingataʻa Tangimana	Independent	540	64.29
Paula Vovole Kohinoa	Independent	195	23.21
Vatau Hui	Independent	61	7.26
ʻAisake Hoatatau Finau	Independent	44	5.24
Total		840	100.00
Valid votes		840	99.76
Invalid/blank votes		2	0.24
Total votes		842	100.00
Registered voters/turnout		1,288	65.37
Source: Matangi Tonga, TEC

2021 general election
Candidate	Party	Votes	%
Vatau Hui	Independent	367	39.29
Sosefo Feʻaomoeata Vakata	Independent	285	30.51
Paea-ʻI-Vaha Filimoehala	Independent	230	24.63
ʻAisake Hoatatau Finau	Independent	52	5.57
Total		934	100.00
Registered voters/turnout		1,277	–
Source: Matangi Tonga

=== Elections in the 2010s ===
2017 general election
Candidate	Party	Votes	%
Vatau Hui	Democrats	438	51.11
Sosefo Feʻaomoeata Vakata	Independent	419	48.89
Total		857	100.00
Valid votes		857	100.00
Invalid/blank votes		0	0.00
Total votes		857	100.00
Source: Matangi Tonga, TEC

2014 general election
Candidate	Party	Votes	%
Sosefo Feʻaomoeata Vakata	Independent	519	54.75
Vatau Hui	Independent	291	30.70
Sione Peauafi Haukinima	Democrats	138	14.56
Total		948	100.00
Valid votes		948	99.89
Invalid/blank votes		1	0.11
Total votes		949	100.00
Source: TEC, Psephos

2010 general election
Candidate	Party	Votes	%
Sosefo Fe‘aomoeata Vakata	Democrats	383	46.76
Sione Feingatau ‘Iloa	Independent	228	27.84
Petelo Fuaevalu ‘Ahomana	Independent	208	25.40
Total		819	100.00
Source: Matangi Tonga

== See also ==
- Constituencies of Tonga
