= 2022 Tongatapu by-elections =

Three by-elections were held in the Tongan electorates of Tongatapu 4, Tongatapu 6, and Tongatapu 7 on 3 November 2022. The by-elections were triggered by the unseating of cabinet ministers Tatafu Moeaki, Poasi Tei, and Sione Sangster Saulala for bribery following the 2021 Tongan general election. The by-elections were won by Mateni Tapueluelu (Tongatapu 4), Dulcie Tei (Tongatapu 6), and Paula Piukala (Tongatapu 7).

Candidate registration for the by-elections was held on September 5 and 6, resulting in five candidates for Tongatapu 4 and Tongatapu 6, and three for Tongatapu 7.

Candidates for Tongatapu 4 were former MPs Mateni Tapueluelu and ʻIsileli Pulu, Viliami 'Alamameita Takau, Toutai 'Ulupano, and 'Etika Cocker.

Candidates for Tongatapu 6 were Tahifisi Vehikite, Sione Talanoa Fifita, Fane Fotu Fituafe, Sepeti Vakameilalo, and Dulcie Elaine Tei.

Candidates for Tongatapu 7 were Feletiliki Fa'otusia, Paula Piveni Piukala, and Kilisitina Saulala.

== Results ==
=== Tongatapu 4 ===
Candidate	Votes	%
Mateni Tapueluelu	973	45.55
Viliami 'Alamameita Takau	810	37.92
'Etika Cocker	300	14.04
'Isileli Pulu	39	1.83
Toutai 'Ulupano	14	0.66
Total	2,136	100.00

=== Tongatapu 6 ===
Candidate	Votes	%
Dulcie Tei	1,308	53.08
Fane Fotu Fituafe	900	36.53
Sione Talanoa Fifita	115	4.67
Tahifisi Vehikite	114	4.63
Sepeti Vakameilalo	27	1.10
Total	2,464	100.00

=== Tongatapu 7 ===
Candidate	Votes	%
Paula Piukala	979	40.16
Kilisitina Saulala	765	31.38
Feletiliki Fa'otusia	694	28.47
Total	2,438	100.00
