= 2026 Niua 17 by-election =

- 8 October 2026
- Turnout: 59.35% (▼6.02pp)
	First party	Second party	Third party
Candidate	‘Aminiasi Tangimana	Sitīveni Selui	Paea Filimoehala
Party	Independent	Independent	Independent
Popular vote	435	144	138
Percentage	55.70%	18.44%	17.67%
MP before election
Lataifaingataʻa Tangimana
Independent
Elected MP
‘Aminiasi Tangimana
Independent

A by-election to the Legislative Assembly of Tonga was held in the Niua 17 constituency on 8 October 2026. The by-election was triggered after the previous representative, Lataifaingataʻa Tangimana, resigned from parliament following his conviction for election bribery. All contestants ran as independents. ‘Aminiasi Tangimana, the son of Lataifaingataʻa Tangimana, won the seat in a landslide, securing 55% of the vote. He defeated four other candidates, including Sitīveni Selui, who placed second with 18%. Voter turnout was 59%, a decline from the previous election.

== Background ==
During the 2025 general election, Lataifaingataʻa Tangimana won the seat in a landslide, with 64% of the vote. He defeated three other candidates, including the incumbent representative, Vatau Hui, who only received 7%. The election produced a parliament composed entirely of independents, with the once dominant Democratic Party of the Friendly Islands failing to capture any seats. The legislature subsequently elected Fatafehi Fakafānua as prime minister, who appointed Tangimana as finance minister. The courts found Tangimana guilty of election bribery on 24 March 2026, and he subsequently resigned from cabinet. He launched an unsuccessful appeal against the conviction and thereafter resigned from parliament, triggering a by-election in the seat. King Tupou VI issued the election writ on 7 August, scheduling the poll for 8 October, the same day as the Tongatapu 2 by-election.

== Electoral system ==
Elections to all 17 Legislative Assembly seats elected by commoners are conducted using the first-past-the-post electoral system. Candidates and voters are required to hold Tongan citizenship, be at least 21 years old, be able to read and write in the Tongan language and not have a mental disability. Contestants also need to reside in the Niua 17 constituency for at least three months before the election, obtain no fewer than 50 signatures from eligible electors, and undergo legal clearance to qualify. As Tonga does not employ overseas voting, all eligible electors were required to be in the country to cast a ballot.

== Candidates ==
Candidates had from 2 to 3 September to formally register their candidacies. Five individuals qualified to contest the election: Sitīveni Selui and ʻAisake Hoatatau Finau of Vaipoa, Sione Tuifio Hui and ‘Aminiasi Tangimana of Falehau, and Paea Filimoehala of Esia village. Finau previously contested the seat in 2025, while Tangimana was the eldest son of the constituency's previous representative. All candidates ran as independents.

== Results ==
On the day of the by-election, polling stations closed at 16:00, and Election Supervisor Sam Vao announced the results several hours later. ‘Aminiasi Tangimana won the by-election in a landslide, receiving 55% of the vote. As in the concurrent Tongatapu 2 by-election, the poll saw the victory of a close relative of the previous representative. Sitīveni Selui placed second with 18% of the vote, followed by Paea Filimoehala, who received 17%. Voter turnout reached 59%, a decrease from 65% in the 2025 general election.

Candidate	Party	Votes	%
‘Aminiasi Tangimana	Independent	435	55.70
Sitīveni Selui	Independent	144	18.44
Paea Filimoehala	Independent	138	17.67
Sione Tuifio Hui	Independent	50	6.40
ʻAisake Hoatatau Finau	Independent	14	1.79
Total		781	100.00
Valid votes		781	100.00
Invalid/blank votes		0	0.00
Total votes		781	100.00
Registered voters/turnout		1,316	59.35
Source: Matangi Tonga, TEC (turnout)
