= Politics of Tonga =

The politics of Tonga take place in a framework of a constitutional monarchy, whereby the King is the Head of State and the Commander-in-Chief of the Armed Forces. Tonga's Prime Minister is currently appointed by the King from among the members of Parliament after having won the support of a majority of its members. Executive power is vested in the Cabinet of Ministers. Legislative power is vested in the King in Parliament, and judicial power is vested in the supreme court.

Tonga joined the Commonwealth of Nations in 1970, and the United Nations in 1999. While exposed to colonial forces, Tonga has never lost indigenous governance, a fact that makes Tonga unique in the Pacific and boosts confidence in the monarchical system. The British High Commission in Tonga closed in March 2006, before reopening 13 years later in mid-2019.

Politics in Tonga has historically been characterized by chiefly rule. In contrast to other Oceanic polities, Tongan chiefly rule has been characterized as uniquely unequal and authoritarian. The political system in Tonga has been characterized by corruption and a lack of political accountability.

Tonga's current king, Tupou VI, traces his line directly back through six generations of monarchs. The previous king, George Tupou V, born in 1946, continued to have ultimate control of the government until July 2008. At that point, concerns over financial irregularities and calls for democracy led to his relinquishing most of his day-to-day powers over the government.

== Executive ==
Main office-holders
Office	Name	Party	Since
King	Tupou VI		18 March 2012
Prime Minister	Fatafehi Fakafānua	Independent	18 December 2025

Its executive includes the prime minister and the cabinet, which becomes the Privy Council when presided over by the monarch. In intervals between legislative sessions, the Privy Council makes ordinances, which become law if confirmed by the legislature. The monarch is hereditary and appoints all members of the cabinet, including the prime minister and the deputy prime minister.

== Legislature ==
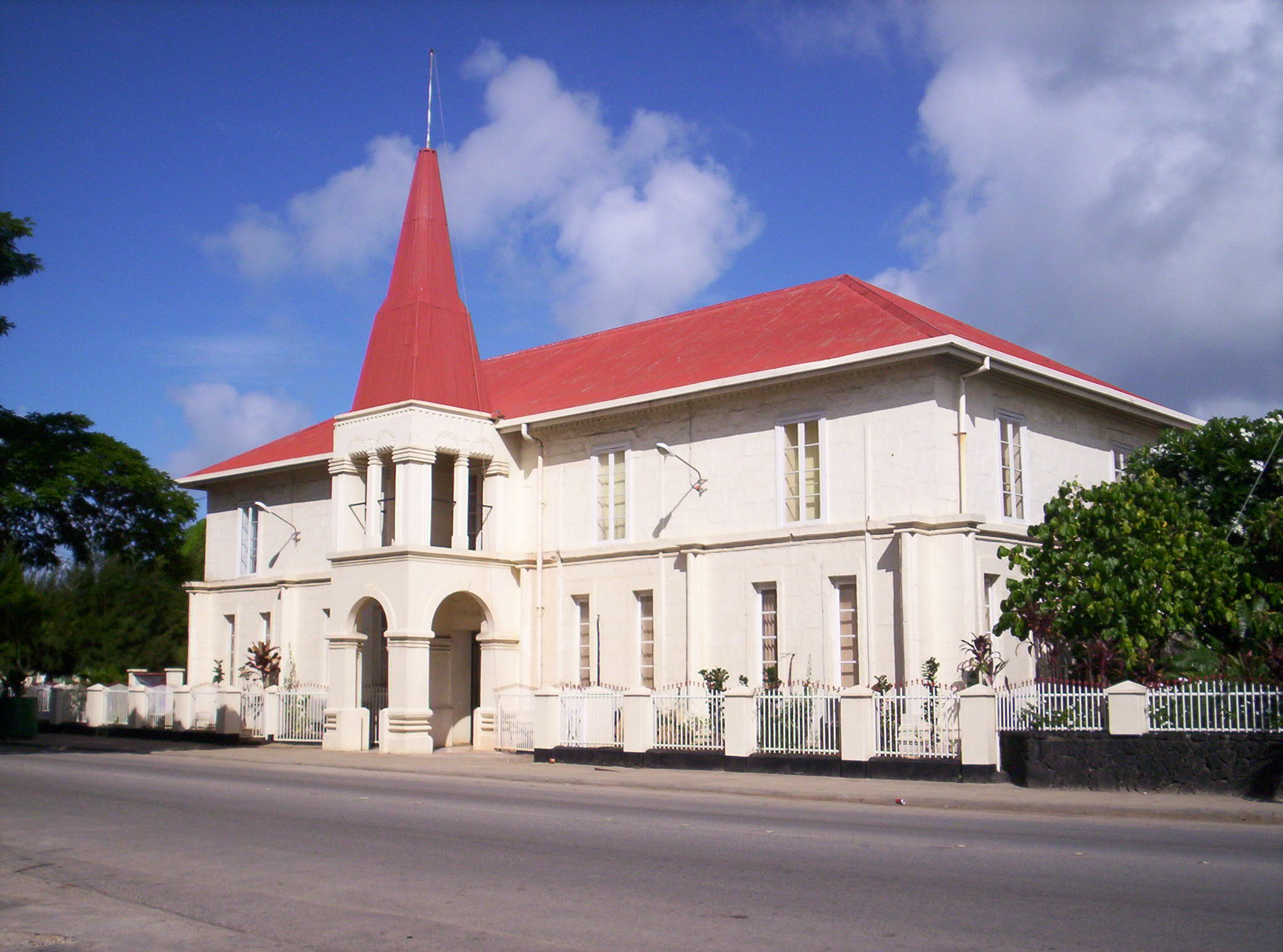
Parliament House in 2006.

The Legislative Assembly is composed of representatives elected by both the Nobles and the people. Currently, there are 17 peoples’ representatives and 9 nobles’ representatives. The composition is established by Article 59 of the Constitution as amended by the " Constitution of Tonga amendment Act 2010 ", which increased the number of representatives directly elected. Article 51 of the same Act allows the PM to nominate and the King to appoint up to 4 extra cabinet members from outside the Assembly.

The current composition is:

- 9 Nobles
- 17 Elected by Commoners

The Legislative Assembly elects a Prime Minister, who has the power to appoint up to 12 Ministers to the Executive Government.

== Political parties and elections ==
Tonga does not have a political party system. MPs not appointed as ministers form an informal opposition and hold an oversight role.

=== By-elections ===
Below is a list of recent or upcoming by-elections:

Election	Date	Reason	Winner
2005 Tongatapu by-election	5 May 2005	Feleti Sevele's elevation to Cabinet	Clive Edwards
2011 Tongatapu 9 by-election	15 September 2011	Death of Kaveinga Fa’anunu	Falisi Tupou (DPFI)
2016 Vavaʻu 16 by-election	14 July 2016	‘Etuate Lavulavu's election voided (bribery and campaign overspending)	'Akosita Lavulavu
2019 Tongatapu 1 by-election	28 November 2019	Death of ʻAkilisi Pōhiva	Siaosi Pohiva (DPFI)
2022 Ha’apai 12 by-election	1 September 2022	Death of Viliami Hingano	Moʻale Finau
2022 Tongatapu by-elections	3 November 2022	Unseating of Tatafu Moeaki, Poasi Tei, and Sione Sangster Saulala	Mateni Tapueluelu (Tongatapu 4), Dulcie Tei (Tongatapu 6), Paula Piukala (Tongatapu 7)
2023 Tongatapu 8 by-election	19 January 2023	Death of Semisi Fakahau	Johnny Taione
2023 Tongatapu 10 by-election	13 July 2023	Death of Pōhiva Tuʻiʻonetoa	Kapelieli Militoni Lanumata
2024 Vavaʻu 14 by-election	28 March 2024	Resignation of Saia Piukala	Mo’ale ‘Otunuku

== Courts ==
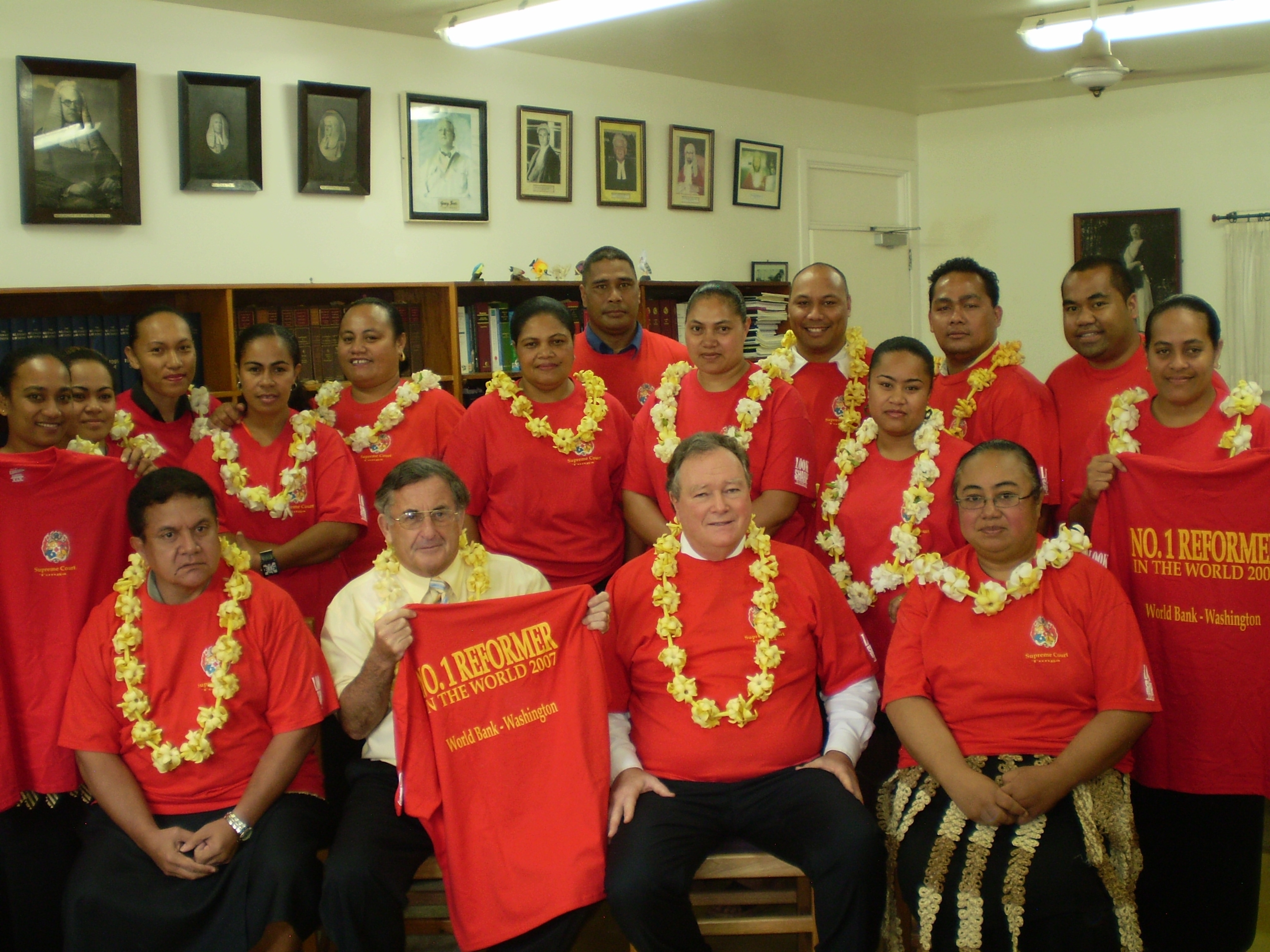
Supreme Court of Tonga, 2007

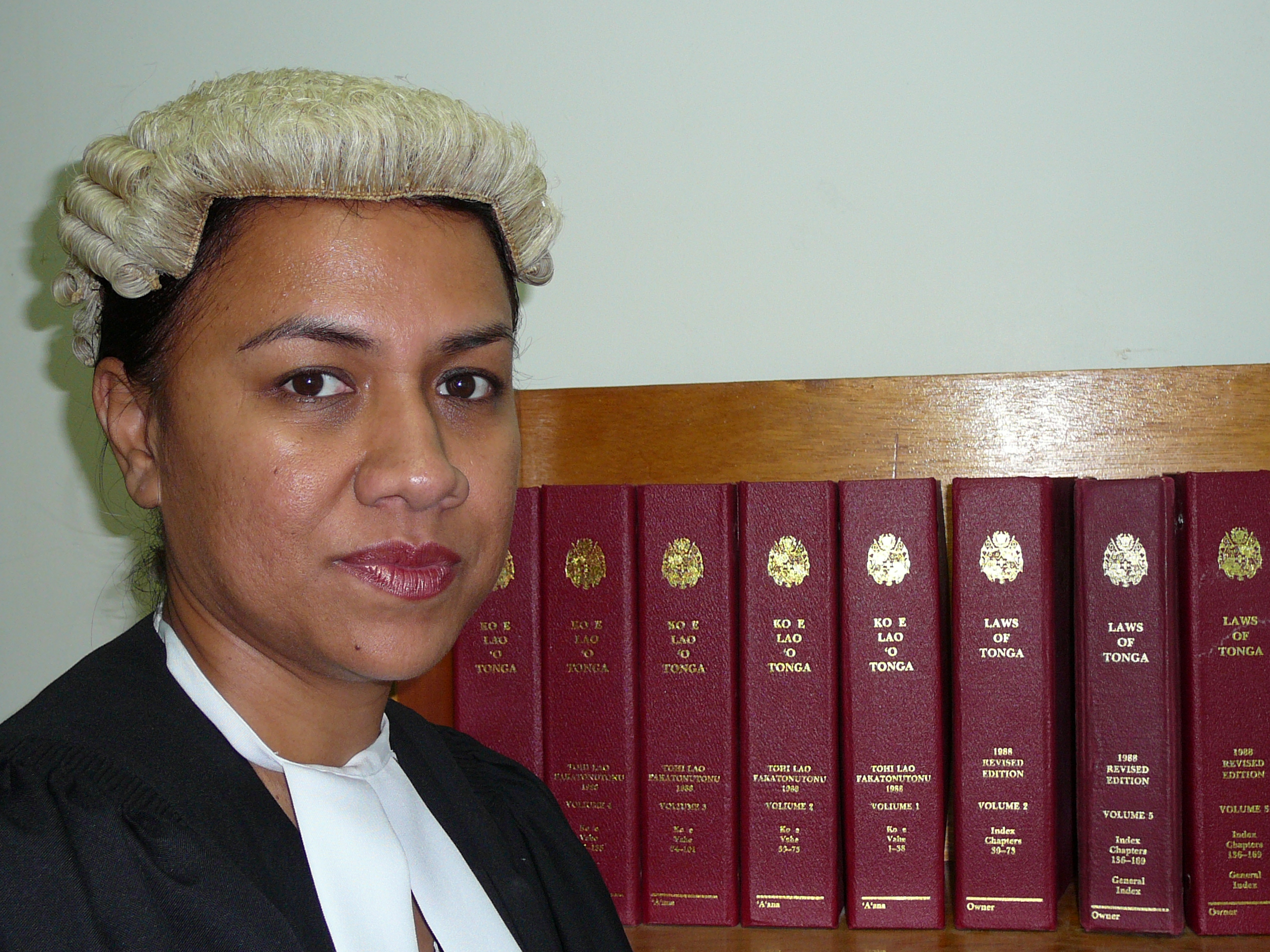
Tongan lawyer

Tonga's court system consists of the Court of Appeal (Privy Council), the Supreme Court, the Magistrates' Court, and the Land Court. Judges are appointed by the monarch.

The judiciary is headed by a Chief Justice. The current Chief Justice is Malcolm Bishop.

== Administrative divisions ==
Tonga is divided into five island groups: 'Eua, Ha'apai, Nuia, Tongatapu, and Vava'u. The only form of local government is through town and district officials who have been popularly elected since 1965. The town official represents the central government in the villages, the district official has authority over a group of villages.

== See also ==
- Electoral calendar
- Electoral system
- Lists of political parties
- 2006 Tonga riots
- Category:Political parties in Tonga
