= Tupouniua =

Tupouniua is a Tongan surname. Notable people with the surname include:

- ʻAlipate Tupouniua (1915−1975), Tongan politician
- Mahe Tupouniua (1927−2007), Tongan politician
- Sitili Tupouniua (born 1997), New Zealand-born Tongan international rugby league footballer
