= Tonga Chronicle =

Newspaper published in Tonga

The Tonga Chronicle (Tongan: Kalonikali Tonga) was a state-owned weekly newspaper in Tonga. It was established in 1964 and published both in English and Tongan until 2009, when it was sold to publisher Kalafi Moala. It ceased publication in 2011.

== History ==
The newspaper was established in 1964 by the government of Crown Prince Tupoutoʻa Tungī.

In March 2009, due to poor returns as a state-owned enterprise, the government of Tonga agreed to hand over management of the Tonga Chronicle to Kalafi Moala's Taimi Media Network, for a three-year period. The staff of the Times of Tonga newspaper moved in to share the state-owned building and assets of the Tonga Chronicle, which then began printing in English only, heavily reducing circulation and cutting staff numbers. The agreement between Moala and the government of Tonga was that he would operate the newspaper and turn it profitable, whilst utilizing the assets of the Chronicle for the publication of his own Tongan newspaper, Taimi ʻo Tonga. Two other government enterprises whose management was outsourced by the Tongan government in 2009, along with the Tonga Chronicle, were the Tonga National Cultural Centre, to Vavaʻu Member of Parliament ʻEtuate Lavulavu; and the Queen Sālote Memorial Hall, to Simote Poʻulivaʻati, former manager of the International Dateline Hotel.

There had been problems in the operation of the paper, which was occasionally withdrawn to publish fortnightly, monthly and ceased publication for periods. In May 2011, Moala took the decision to cease publication of the paper indefinitely. On 20 March 2012, as the management contract ended, "the Tonga Chronicle and its assets [were] returned to the government".

At the time of its dissolution, the managing editor was former editor of the Taimi ʻo Tonga, Fakaʻosi Maama. Previous editors of the newspaper included Paua Manuʻatu (Tuʻisoso), Pilimisolo Tamoʻua, Muhammad Ali Afu and Mateaki Heimuli, then outsourced to Taimi Media Network and editors Kalafi Moala, Josephine Latu-Sanft and Tevita Motulalo. Articles of the newspaper were also published on the Taimi ʻo Tonga alternate website.
