= Lataifaingataʻa Tangimana =

Tongan politician

Minister of Finance
- In office 6 January 2026 – 15 April 2026
- Prime Minister: Fatafehi Fakafānua
- Preceded by: ʻAisake Eke
- Succeeded by: Vika Lavemaau

Member of the Tongan Parliament
- In office 15 December 2025 – 31 July 2026
- Preceded by: Vatau Hui
- Constituency: Niua 17

Personal details
- Party: Independent

Lataifaingataʻa Tangimana is a Tongan politician who served as minister of finance from 2025 until his resignation in 2026. He represented the Niua 17 constituency during that time and stepped down following a conviction for election bribery.

== Career ==
Tangimana won the Niua 17 seat in a landslide, with 64% of the vote, during the 2025 general election, which saw independent candidates capture all seats in parliament. He defeated three other candidates, including the incumbent member Vatau Hui. Tangimana was subsequently appointed finance minister in the cabinet of the newly elected prime minister, Fatafehi Fakafānua. He was sworn in on 6 January 2026.

Tangimana was convicted of election bribery by the Supreme Court on 24 March and resigned from cabinet on 15 April; however, he remained in parliament while he appealed the conviction. Prime Minister Fakafānua assumed the finance portfolio thereafter. The court denied his appeal on 27 July, voiding his election. Tangimana resigned from the Legislative Assembly on 31 July, shortly before he was scheduled to be removed on 3 August, triggering a by-election in the Niua 17 seat.
