= Tuutafaiva =

Tuutafaiva is a surname. Notable people with the surname include:

- ʻAta Maama Tu’utafaiva (born 1997), Tongan athlete
- Siosifa Tuʻitupou Tuʻutafaiva (fl. 1998), Tongan lawyer
