= Tiueti =

Tiueti is a surname. Notable people with the surname include:

- Dave Tiueti (born 1973), Tongan rugby union player
- Tiofilusi Tiueti (fl. 2013), Tongan civil servant
