= Alipate =

Alipate is a name. Notable people with the name include:

- Alipate Aloisio Leone (born 1982), Tongan professional wrestler
- Alipate Carlile (born 1987), Australian rules footballer
- Alipate Fatafehi (born 1984), Tongan rugby union player
- Alipate Korovou, Fijian boxer
- Alipate Nagata, Fijian politician
- Alipate Noilea, Fijian rugby league and rugby union footballer
- Alipate Qetaki, Fijian lawyer
- Alipate Ratini (born 1991), Fijian rugby union and rugby league footballer
- Alipate Sikivou (died 1970), Fijian politician
- Alipate Tuilevuka (born 1980), American rugby union player
- ʻAlipate Tuʻivanuavou Vaea (born 1957), Tongan politician
- ʻAlipate Tupouniua (1915–1975), Tongan politician
- Tuineau Alipate (1967–2021), Tongan gridiron football player
