= Pōhiva =

Pōhiva is both a given name and a surname. Notable people with the name include:

- Pōhiva Tuʻiʻonetoa (1951–2023), Tongan accountant and politician
- ʻAkilisi Pōhiva (1941–2019), Tongan pro-democracy activist and politician
- Siaosi Pōhiva, Tongan politician
