= Afuʻalo Matoto =

Tongan civil servant and politician

Minister of Finance
- In office 20 March 2008 – 3 January 2011
- Prime Minister: Feleti Sevele
- Preceded by: Feleti Sevele
- Succeeded by: Sunia Fili

Minister for Public Enterprises
- In office October 2006 – 3 January 2011

Minister for Information
- In office 24 July 2007 – April 2009
- Preceded by: none (portfolio established)
- Succeeded by: 'Eseta Fusitu'a

ʻOtenifi Afuʻalo Matoto, styled Lord Matoto of Tuʻanekivale, is a Tongan civil servant, politician and former Cabinet Minister. He was Minister of Finance in the government of Feleti Sevele from 2008 to 2011.

== Early life ==
Having obtained a Bachelor of Arts degree from the University of Auckland, he became an assistant teacher at the Tonga High School in 1968. He later obtained a Master of Arts degree from the University of Durham in 1971, and was appointed Assistant Secretary at the Tongan Ministry of Finance that same year. He was Secretary of Finance from 1977 to 1983, then became the Bank of Tonga's Manager for Development and Planning. From 1999 to 2006, he was Managing Director of the Tonga Development Bank.

Matoto was also Treasurer of the Tonga Rugby Football Union from 1975 to 1982, and Chairman of the TRFU Referees Association "from the early 80s to the early 90s". He is the current President of the Nuku'alofa Rotary Club, of which he has been a member since 1974. He is, in addition, an ordained Minister of the Free Church of Tonga.

== Political career ==
Matoto was appointed to Cabinet as Minister for Public Enterprises in October 2006. He was appointed Tonga's first Minister of Information in July 2007. As Information Minister he claimed that the Prime Minister was being targeted by a 'hate campaign" run by the Kele'a newspaper, and drafted new guidelines for political reporting by the Tonga Broadcasting Commission. In March 2008 he was appointed Finance Minister. As Finance Minister he oversaw a series of privatisations, including selling the government's 40% share of Westpac Bank of Tonga to Westpac. He also oversaw an unpopular Ministerial pay increase in 2009 and a series of budget cuts in 2010. He lost his position when Tonga moved to an elected government after the 2010 Tongan general election.

In December 2010, he was one of the first people to be named a Life Peer in Tonga's heretofore solely hereditary nobility, by King George Tupou V. As a Noble of the Realm, he is known as Lord Matoto of Tuʻanekivale.

== Honours ==
National honours

- Order of Queen Sālote Tupou III, Grand Cross (31 July 2008).
