= ʻUtoikamanu =

ʻUtoikamanu or Utoikamanu is a surname. Notable people with the surname include:

- Fekitamoeloa ʻUtoikamanu (born 1959), Tongan civil servant
- Siosiua ʻUtoikamanu, Tongan politician
- Stefano Utoikamanu (born 2000), New Zealand rugby league player
