= Tongan pound =

Currency of Tonga from 1921 to 1967

The pound was the currency of Tonga between 1921 until 1967. Issued by the Board of Commissioners of Currency of Tonga, it was subdivided into 20 shillings, each of 12 pence.

== History ==
For most of its history, Tonga relied upon the barter system. This system continued until William Mariner arrived on Tonga in the 1800s and lived amongst the locals and tried to teach them about the Western concept of money. Initially, when Tonga became a British protectorate, the Pound sterling was circulated as the official Tongan currency. This was supplemented from 1921 by sterling banknotes issued by the Tongan government which became the Tongan Pound.

The notes were denominated in sterling and included the rather unusual denomination of 4 shillings. When the Australian pound devalued relative to sterling at the beginning of the Great Depression, this caused considerable confusion in the other British territories in the Pacific. In the mid-1930s, people in these islands were asking whether or not the money in their sterling accounts were to be considered as sterling or the Australian pound, and clarification was sought. In 1936, one Tongan pound was devalued to be worth 16 shillings sterling, setting the Tongan pound equal to the Australian pound. Existing banknotes had the word "sterling" overstamped, later issues omitted the word altogether. In 1967, the pound was replaced by the decimalised pa'anga at a rate of £1 = T$2. Originally the new money was going to be called the Tongan Dollar, but this was changed on the grounds that it sounded similar to the Tongan language word "tola" which meant "pig's snout". Pa'anga was chosen instead.

== See also ==
- British currency in Oceania
- Economy of Tonga
