= Siosifa Tuʻitupou Tuʻutafaiva =

Tongan lawyer and politician

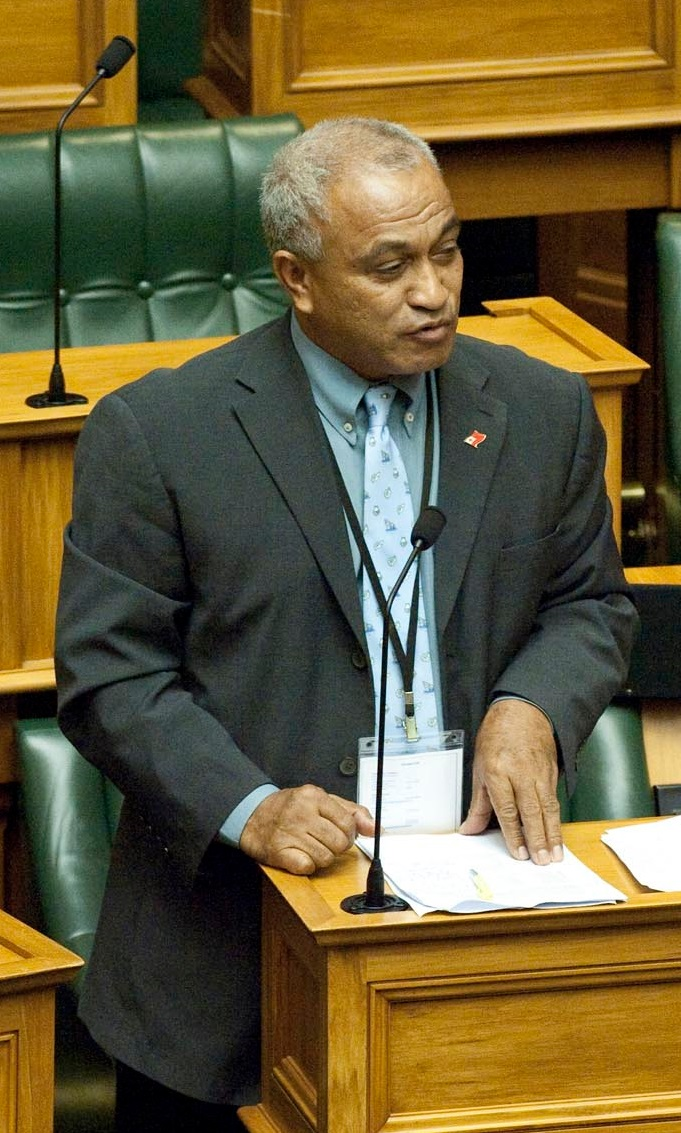
- Siosifa Tuʻitupou Tuʻutafaiva in 2013

Minister for Police, Prisons and Fire Services Minister for Revenue Services
- In office 2 February 2013 – 27 November 2014
- Prime Minister: Lord Tuʻivakano
- Preceded by: Lord Tuʻivakano (Police; acting); Feʻao Vakata (Revenue)
- Succeeded by: Pohiva Tuʻiʻonetoa (Police); Tevita Lavemaau (Revenue)

Member of Parliament for Tongatapu 6
- In office 25 November 2010 – 27 November 2014
- Preceded by: none (constituency established)
- Succeeded by: Poasi Tei
- Majority: 0.1% (four votes)

Personal details
- Party: Democratic Party of the Friendly Islands

Siosifa Tuʻitupou Tuʻutafaiva is a Tongan lawyer and politician.

== Biography ==
Tuʻutafaiva has served as an advocate lawyer in a number of high-profile cases. In 2001, he represented ʻAkilisi Pohiva, the main leader of Tonga's pro-democracy movement, when the latter was sued for defamation. Pohiva, a Member of Parliament, was the editor, owner and publisher of the Keleʻa pro-democracy newspaper, in which an article in late 1998 alleged that the Auditor General, Pohiva Tuʻiʻonetoa, had lied and "altered the correct result of [an] independent examination". A jury found for ʻAkilisi Pohiva in the Supreme Court, on the grounds that the article was not malicious, and the Court of Appeal upheld the judgment.

He began a career in national politics when he was elected People's Representative to Parliament for the constituency of Tongatapu 6 in the November 2010 general election, standing as a candidate for the Democratic Party of the Friendly Islands. He obtained 26.5% of the vote in his constituency, seeing off fourteen other candidates. It was a narrow victory; he obtained just four votes more than fellow candidate Siosaia Moehau.

He continued to work as a lawyer, and was defence counsel in two significant cases shortly after his election. He represented the Keleʻa newspaper again when it was sued for defamation by Clive Edwards, Minister of Public Enterprises and Revenue, who accused its editor, Mateni Tapueluelu, and its publisher, Laucala Pohiva Tapueluelu, of having falsely written that he was a member of a "secret" political party. Specifically, Edwards alleged that the false story had contributed to his losing his seat in Parliament in the 2010 general election. (He remained in Cabinet nonetheless, as an appointee.) Tuʻutafaiva represented the Tapueluelus, while Edwards, a lawyer, represented himself. The case began in the Magistrate's Court in late January 2011. The case began fairly poorly for Tuʻutafaiva, when one of the first witnesses he called failed to corroborate the defendants' version of events. A few days later, he was defence counsel in a case which the Times of Tonga described as "set to be one of Tonga’s most watched trials in recent history". The case, beginning before the Supreme Court, was a criminal trial over the sinking of the MV Princess Ashika, an inter-island ferry which sank in August 2009 with seventy-four fatalities. Five persons, and the Shipping Corporation of Polynesia, were charged primarily with manslaughter by negligence over the death of one of the passengers, Vae Fetuʻu Taufa. Tuʻutafaiva served as counsel for two of the accused: captain Makahokovalu Tuputupu and first mate Semisi Pomale.

On 2 February 2013, Prime Minister Lord Tuʻivakano appointed him Minister for Police, Prisons and Fire Services, and Minister for Revenue Services, his first ministerial appointments.

He was not re-elected at the 2014 Tongan general election.
