= Tongatapu 1 =

Electoral constituency in Tonga

- Constituency for the Legislative Assembly of Tonga
- Region: Tongatapu

Current constituency
- Created: 2010
- Number of members: 1
- Party: Independent
- Member: Tēvita Fatafehi Puloka

Tongatapu 1 is an electoral constituency for the Legislative Assembly in the Kingdom of Tonga. It was established for the November 2010 general election, when the multi-seat regional constituencies for People's Representatives were replaced by single-seat constituencies, electing one representative via the first past the post electoral system. Located on the country's main island, Tongatapu, it encompasses the villages of Kolomotuʻa, Tongataʻeapa, Tufuenga, Sopu-ʻo-Taufaʻahau, ʻIsileli, Halaʻo vave, Tuʻatakilangi, Longolongo, Vaololoa, and Kapeta.

Its first ever representative was ʻAkilisi Pohiva, a veteran MP first elected in 1987 and who thus began his ninth consecutive term; the leading figure of the pro-democracy movement, he was the leader of the Democratic Party of the Friendly Islands. He won the seat by an overwhelming margin, appearing to make it, at present, a safe seat for the party. In the 2014 general election he was re-elected comfortably, with a diminished but still absolute majority (53.5%).

== Members of Parliament ==
Election	Member	Party
2010	ʻAkilisi Pohiva	Democratic Party of the Friendly Islands
2019 by-election	Siaosi Pōhiva	Democratic Party of the Friendly Islands
2021	Tēvita Fatafehi Puloka	Independent

== Election results ==
=== 2025 ===
Tongan general election, 2025: Tongatapu 1
Party	Candidate	Votes	%	±%
Independent	Tēvita Fatafehi Puloka	1343	62.58	+4.13
Independent	Siaosi Pōhiva	758	35.32	–3.11
Independent	Eliesa Fifita	45	2.10	+1.60
Turnout		2146		
Majority		585	27.26	+5.38
Independent hold		Swing	+4.13	

=== 2021 ===
Tongan general election, 2021: Tongatapu 1
Party	Candidate	Votes	%	±%
Independent	Tēvita Fatafehi Puloka	1695	58.45	+7.88
Democratic Party of the Friendly Islands	Siaosi Pōhiva	1114	38.41	
Independent	Ikani Loneli Taliai	44	1.52	
Independent	Sione Keuate Tupouniua	34	1.17	
Independent	Eliesa Fifita	13	0.45	
Turnout		2900		
Majority		581	21.88	–28.69
Independent gain from Democrats		Swing	+20.04	

=== 2017 ===
Tongan general election, 2017: Tongatapu 1
Party	Candidate	Votes	%	±%
Democrats	ʻAkilisi Pohiva	1379	50.57	−2.93
Independent	Netatua Pelesikoti	352	12.91	
Independent	Sione Tukia	279	10.23	
Independent	Ofo-Mei-Vaha Tupou Niumeitolu	196	7.19	
Independent	Mosese Teukiveiuto Manuofetoa	128	4.69	
Independent	Siotame Drew Havea	109	4.00	
Independent	Siale ʻAtaongo Puloka	80	2.93	
Independent	ʻAna Kanume Bing Fonua	79	2.90	
Independent	Sione Keuate Tupouniua	62	2.27	
Independent	Barry Smith Taukolo	49	1.80	
Independent	ʻEliesa Fifita	14	0351	
Turnout		2,727		
Majority		1027	50.57	+13.47
Democrats hold		Swing	-2.93	

=== 2014 ===
Tongan general election, 2014: Tongatapu 1
Party	Candidate	Votes	%	±%
Democrats	ʻAkilisi Pohiva	1422	53.5	−9
(unknown)	William Cocker	437		
(unknown)	Mosese Manuofetoa	325		
(unknown)	‘Ilisapesi Baker	191		
(unknown)	‘Ana Bing Fonua	129		
(unknown)	‘Eliesa Fifita	74		
(unknown)	‘Emeline Tuita	71		
(unknown)	Soloni Lutui	7		
Turnout		2656		
Majority		985	37.1	−4
Democrats hold		Swing	-9	

=== 2010 ===
Tongan general election, 2010: Tongatapu 1
Party	Candidate	Votes	%	±%
Democrats	Samuela ʻAkilisi Pohiva	1657	62.5	
(unknown)	Taniela Talifolau Palu	567	21.4	
(unknown)	Poutele Kaho Tuʻihalamaka	270	10.2	
(unknown)	ʻInoke Fotu Huʻakau	105	4.0	
(unknown)	ʻEliesa Fifita	38	1.4	
(unknown)	Siosifa Moala Taumoepeau	13	0.5	
Turnout		2650		
Majority		1090	41.1	n/a
Democrats win (new seat)				

== See also ==
- Constituencies of Tonga
