= Sione Tapa =

Tongan politician, physician, and philanthropist (1923–2018)

Sione Tapa (30 October 1923 – 9 May 2018) was a Tongan politician, physician, and philanthropist. He was the first Tongan to graduate with a medical degree. He served as Tonga's Health Minister from 1970 to 1996.

Tapa was born in Nukuʻalofa and educated at Tonga College and the Fiji School of Medicine. After graduating in 1944, he attended Auckland Grammar School and then the University of Otago, graduating in 1953 with an MB ChB. He worked as a medical officer for the Tongan government from 1955 to 1970, when he was appointed Minister of Health, a role he held until 1996. He also served as acting Minister of Finance from September 1970 to May 1971 while Mahe 'Uli'uli Tupouniua was studying overseas, and again from November 1972 to January 1981.

In May 1977 he was elected president of the 30th World Health Assembly, He was later chair of the World Health Organization Regional Committee for the Western Pacific from 1982 to 1983, and a member of the WHO Executive Board from 1989 to 1990. In 1991 he was awarded the WHO Health-for-All Gold Medal.

In 2012 he donated TP$1 million saved from his ministerial salary to establish a scholarship for students who wanted to study health.

== Honours ==
National honours

- Order of Queen Sālote Tupou III, Grand Cross (31 July 2008).
