= Siosiua =

Siosiua is a given name. Notable people with the given name include:

- Siosiua ʻUtoikamanu, Tongan politician
- Tu'iono Siosiua "Josh" Liava'a (1948–2014), Tongan-born rugby league player
- Siosiua Halanukonuka (born 1986), Tongan rugby union player
