= Moeaki =

Moeaki is a given name and surname. Notable people with the name include:

- Moeaki Fotuaika (born 1999), Tongan rugby league player
- Tatafu Moeaki (born 1972), Tongan politician
- Tony Moeaki (born 1987), American football player
