= James Cecil Cocker =

Tongan politician

Minister of Finance
- In office 1982–1991
- Prime Minister: Fatafehi Tuʻipelehake
- Preceded by: Mahe Tupouniua
- Succeeded by: Tutoatasi Fakafanua

Personal details
- Born: 26 July 1939
- Died: May 2014 (aged 74)

James Cecil Cocker was a Tongan politician who formerly served as a cabinet minister and Deputy Prime Minister and Minister of Finance.

Cocker was born on 26 July 1939 in Nuku'alofa. He got a Bachelor of Commerce degree in 1963.

Cocker was appointed into the cabinet as the Minister of Finance in 1982, and served until 1991. In October 2001, King Tāufaʻāhau Tupou IV appointed him as the Deputy Prime Minister. Cocker was described as one of king's friends.

Cocker served as a director in the National Reserve Bank of Tonga from November 2013 and May 2014, when he died.
