= Sosefo Feʻaomoeata Vakata =

Tongan politician (born 1969)

Minister for Public Enterprises
- In office 2 February 2013 – 30 December 2014
- Prime Minister: Lord Tuʻivakano
- Preceded by: Clive Edwards
- Succeeded by: Poasi Tei

Minister for Revenue
- In office 1 May 2012 – 2 February 2013
- Prime Minister: Lord Tuʻivakano
- Preceded by: Sunia Fili
- Succeeded by: Sifa Tuʻutafaiva

Minister for Training, Employment, Youth and Sports
- In office 4 January 2011 – 1 May 2012
- Prime Minister: Lord Tuʻivakano
- Preceded by: Lord Tuʻivakano
- Succeeded by: Lord Vaea

Minister of Internal Affairs
- In office 30 December 2014 – 16 September 2016
- Prime Minister: ʻAkilisi Pōhiva
- Succeeded by: Penisimani Fifita

Member of Parliament for Niua 17
- In office 25 November 2010 – 16 November 2017
- Preceded by: Sione ʻIloa
- Succeeded by: Vatau Hui
- Majority: 19.0%

Personal details
- Born: 13 February 1969 (age 57)
- Party: Independent
- Other political affiliations: Democratic Party of the Friendly Islands (until after the 2010 elections)

Sosefo Feʻaomoeata Vakata (born 13 February 1969) is a Tongan politician and former member of the Legislative Assembly of Tonga. He is a former member of the Democratic Party of the Friendly Islands.

He holds a Master of Science degree in physics from the University of Queensland, and also has an IRB Level 2 Rugby Coaching Certificate; he lists coaching rugby as one of his hobbies. He "taught at Tonga High School for many years", then worked as a civil servant, holding the positions of radio licensing officer and outer islands project manager, then communications engineer, at the Ministry of Information and Communications.

Vakata was elected to the Legislative Assembly for the first time when he won the seat of Ongo Niua 17 in the November 2010 general election as a candidate for the Democratic Party, defeating incumbent independent MP Sione ʻIloa. On 8 December 2010 it was reported that he had withdrawn his support from the Democratic party and become an independent, and would support a noble candidate as Prime Minister.

At the start of January 2011, when newly elected Prime Minister Sialeʻataongo Tuʻivakanō formed his Cabinet, Vakata was appointed Minister for Training, Employment, Youth and Sports. On 1 May 2012, he reshuffled to the position of Minister for Revenue.

In July 2012, Vakata was accused of mis-using government funds allocated to him for expenses during a trip to Australia which was later cancelled. He denied the allegations, but repaid the money.

In February 2013, he was reshuffled to the position of Minister of Public Enterprises.

Following the 2014 Tongan general election he was appointed to the Cabinet of ʻAkilisi Pōhiva as Minister of Internal Affairs, Women, and Sport. In September 2016 he was dismissed from his Ministerial positions after throwing a wine glass at a senior civil servant.

He was not re-elected at the 2017 election.
