= Tongatapu 9 =

Electoral constituency in Tonga

- Constituency for the Legislative Assembly of Tonga
- Region: Tongatapu
- Electorate: 2,959

Current constituency
- Created: 2010
- Number of members: 1
- Party: Independent
- Member(s): Sevenitini Toumoʻua

Tongatapu 9 is an electoral constituency for the Legislative Assembly in the Kingdom of Tonga. It was established for the November 2010 general election, when the multi-seat regional constituencies for People's Representatives were replaced by single-seat constituencies, electing one representative via the first past the post electoral system. It is a rural constituency located in the south-east of the island of Tongatapu, and covers the villages of Tatakamotonga, Holonga, ʻAlakifonua, Pelehake, Toloa, Fuaʻamotu, Nakolo, Haʻasini, Hamula, Lavengatonga, Fatumu and Haveluliku.

Its first ever representative was Kaveinga Faʻanunu, a first term MP from the Democratic Party of the Friendly Islands, who won it in the November 2010 general election, and died of cancer seven months later, in July 2011. A by-election was held on September 15, 2011 - the first for any seat since the 2010 general election. The Democratic Party retained the seat, with its candidate Falisi Tupou winning by a substantial margin. It appears, at present, to be a safe seat for the party.

== Members of Parliament ==
Election	Member	Party
2010	Kaveinga Faʻanunu	Democratic Party of the Friendly Islands
2011 by-election	Falisi Tupou	Democratic Party of the Friendly Islands
2014	Penisimani Fifita	Democratic Party of the Friendly Islands
2017	Penisimani Fifita	Democratic Party of the Friendly Islands
2021	Sevenitini Toumoʻua	Independent

== Election results ==
=== 2010 ===
Tongan general election, 2010: Tongatapu 9
Party	Candidate	Votes	%	±%
DPFI	Kaveinga Faʻanunu	908	34.0	
(unknown)	Sevenitini Toumoʻua	414	15.5	
(unknown)	Viliami Fukofuka	262	9.8	
(unknown)	Filimone Fifita	241	9.0	
(unknown)	ʻAisake ʻEtimoni Tuʻiono	229	8.6	
(unknown)	Siaosi ʻEnosi Tuʻipulotu	147	5.5	
(unknown)	Semisi Kailahi	136	5.1	
(unknown)	Tonga Tongilava Lemoto	110	4.1	
(unknown)	ʻEpeli Taufa Kalemani	51	1.9	
(unknown)	Konisitutone Simana Kami	50	1.9	
(unknown)	Falati Papani	49	1.8	
(unknown)	Mosese Latu	22	0.8	
(unknown)	Sione ʻUmeahola Faeamani	21	0.8	
(unknown)	ʻOfa Fatai	18	0.7	
(unknown)	Samisoni Lotaki Kanongataʻa	15	0.6	
Turnout		2673		
Majority		494	18.5	
DPFI win (new seat)				

=== 2011 by-election ===
Tongatapu 9 by-election, 2011
Party	Candidate	Votes	%	±%
DPFI	Falisi Tupou	745	32.83	−1.2%
(unknown)	Sevenitini Toumoʻua	483	21.29	+5.8%
(unknown)	Viliami Fukofuka	469	20.67	+10.9%
(unknown)	Siaosi ʻEnosi Tuʻipulotu	254	11.20	+5.7%
(unknown)	ʻEpeli Taufa Kalemani	199	8.77	+6.9%
(unknown)	Konisitutone Simana Kami	119	5.24	+3.3%
Turnout		2,269	76.68%	
Majority		262	11.55%	−7%
DPFI hold		Swing	-1.2%	

=== 2014 ===
Along with five other incumbent DPFI MPs, Falisi Tupou was not selected as a DPFI candidate for this election, and announced he would be running as an independent candidate.

Tongan general election, 2014: Tongatapu 9
Party	Candidate	Votes	%	±%
(unknown)				
Turnout				

== See also ==
- Constituencies of Tonga
