= Siosi Cocker Mafi =

Tongan economist and banker

Governor of National Reserve Bank of Tonga
- In office May 2003 – 5 July 2013
- Preceded by: Siosiua ʻUtoikamanu
- Succeeded by: Sione Ngongo Kioa

Siosi Cocker Mafi is a Tongan economist. She was Governor of the National Reserve Bank of Tonga from May 2003 to July 2013, the first women to serve in the post.

== Career ==
Mafi started working for the central during 1993. In 2003 she was appointed governor and became the first female central bank governor in Pacific Islands. She was deputy governor from 2000, and also worked as an economist in Tonga's Ministry of Finance for the last three years before she became governor.

Sione Ngongo Kioa took over as central bank governor from Siosi Mafi on 21 August 2013, when her second 5-year term expired.
