= Netatua Pelesikoti =

Tongan environmental scientist (died 2020)

- Died: 11 November 2020; Nuku’alofa, Tonga
- Burial place: Telekava Cemetery
- Other name: Netatua Pelesikoti Taufatofua
- Education: University of the South Pacific; University of Wollongong
- Occupation: environmental scientist
- Spouse: Pita Taufatofua
- Children: Siosi’ana and Filimone

Netatua (Neta) Pelesikoti (died 11 November 2020), also known as Netatua Pelesikoti Taufatofua, was an environmental scientist from Tonga.

== Biography ==
Pelesikoti studied geography and economics at the University of the South Pacific, followed by a master's degree in coastal management in the Netherlands and a Ph.D. degree at University of Wollongong, Australia (2003) in Sustainable Coastal Resource Monitoring and Assessment, coastal water quality, coral reefs and sea grass.

In 1999, Pelesikoti was named to an elite group of 15 international experts who were part of the World Meteorological Organization Scientific Advisory Panel (WMOSAP).

=== Career ===
A coastal ecologist by profession, she began her life's work as an environmental technical officer in Tonga. She then moved on to work on policy and management at the national level. She also served as an advisor at the South Pacific Applied Geoscience Commission (SOPAC), now called the Applied Geoscience Division of the Pacific Community.

Pelesikoti was the director of the Climate Change Division at the Secretariat of the Pacific Regional Environment Programme for more than seven years in Apia, Samoa. In 2012, she was the first Pacific island woman to become a lead author of an Intergovernmental Panel on Climate Change Report. She also worked as a consultant with the World Bank. She has been described as the 'Queen of Disaster Risk Management' in the Pacific region.

=== Candidate ===
In 2017, at the conclusion of her term at the Pacific Regional Environment Programme, she returned to Tonga. She ran as a candidate for Tongatapu 1 in the previous General Election and narrowly lost a 2019 By-Election. In 2019 she was admitted to an International Scientific Advisory Panel for the World Meteorological Organisation, and was Deputy Chair of the Tonga Cable Ltd. Board.

Pelesikoti died suddenly in Nuku’alofa on 11 November 2020 in Tonga's capital, Nuku’alofa. She was survived by her husband, Dr. Pita Taufatofua, and children Siosi’ana and Filimone. She was buried in Telekava Cemetery in Kolomotu’a.

== Selected works ==
- Looijen, J., Pelesikoti, N., & Staljanssens, M. (1995). ICOMIS: a spatial multi-objective decision support system for coastal resource management. ITC journal, 3, 202-216.
- Mimura, N., & Pelesikoti, N. (1997). Vulnerability of Tonga to future sea-level rise. Journal of Coastal Research, 117-132.
- Pelesikoti, N. (2003). Sustainable Resource and Environmental Management in Tonga: Current situation, community perceptions and a proposed new policy framework.
- Penaia, A., Titimaea, A., Kohlhase, J., Nelson, F., Pelesikoti, N., Bonte-Grapentin, M., ... & Lumbroso, D. (2007). Reducing Flood Risk–From Science to Policy: The Samoa Process. Presented at: 24th STAR Session held in conjunction with the SOPAC 36th Session, 22, 29.
- Nurse, L. A., McLean, R. F., Agard, J., Briguglio, L., Duvat-Magnan, V., Pelesikoti, N., ... & Webb, A. (2014). Small islands.
- Pelesikoti, N., & Suwamaru, J. K. (2017). ICTs in Pacific Islands’ climate change and disaster risk reduction policy and programs. In Achieving Sustainable E-Government in Pacific Island States (pp. 269–303). Springer, Cham.
- Sohn, S. J., Kim, W., Yoo, J. H., Lee, Y. Y., Oh, S. M., Kim, B. R., ... & Pelesikoti, N. (2018). The Republic of Korea-Pacific Islands Climate Prediction Services Project. Bulletin of the American Meteorological Society, 99(2), 253-257.
- Mackay, S., Brown, R., Gonelevu, M., Pelesikoti, N., Kocovanua, T., Iaken, R., ... & Mackey, B. (2019). Overcoming barriers to climate change information management in small island developing states: lessons from pacific SIDS. Climate Policy, 19(1), 125-138.
