= 2005 Tongan public service strike =

Labor dispute in Tonga

The 2005 Tongan public service strike was a campaign protest against the Tongan government's decision to refuse negotiations for a bigger salary increase for civil service workers. Leading up to the strike, the Tongan government's decision to downsize the civil service, new taxes, the royal family's disregard for calls for democracy, and inflation contributed to civil strife. The crown prince voted to give himself a high salary. Within months, demonstrations began and culminated with Tonga's biggest march ever, as 10,000 protested the shoreline company.

The Tongan strikers were informed by parliament of the need to collaborate with department heads for a solution. One of the leaders of the Public Servants Association (PSA) made the executive decision to bring up labor grievances directly with the Tongan government. During the strike, the Public Service Association was founded, with an emphasis on a nonviolent movement protest, although it wasn't officially a union.

Refusal by the Tongan government in 2005 to negotiate a bigger salary increase for civil service workers caused the PSA to send civil service workers on strike on 25 July. The six-week-long strike resulted in salary increases ranging from 60 to 80%. The strike has orators making speeches about the royal family.

== Strike ==
On 22 July 2005, 40% of the country's civil service workers, or about 2,000 people, went on strike. Over a thousand public servants rallied in Nukuʻalofa, the capital city of Tonga, as organized by the PSA. Strikers began to meet daily at a park located near the parliament building called Pangai SiʻI. The government ministries had to close down, with the Ministry of Labour only having two people show up to work that day. Public school teachers also joined the strike, with over 1,400 supporting the civil servants. After two days, all primary and secondary schools in the country shut down early for the August holidays.

On 25 July, 2,000 striking public servants were made as they rallied at Queen Sālote Hall and then continued on to the parliament building, where they displayed their letter of petition to the Speaker of the House, which demanded pay increases ranging from 60 to 80%. The Speaker of the House stated that the petition would be examined by Parliament, but no immediate action was taken. On 4 August, a negotiation offered pay raises of 10–20%, to which the PSA rejected the committee's offer. The PSA then planned a march on King Tāufaʻāhau Tupou IV, which would be led by "The People's Prince" Tuʻipelehake on 8 August.

On 12 August, the cabinet had police stop protestors from demonstrating at Pangai SiʻI, but the Land Court overturned the order on 13 August, and Chief Justice Webster ordered that the government not remove civilians from public spaces. King Tupou joined more than 5,000 people on 15 August in Teufavia Stadium to pray for a resolution to the strike. Two days later, students took some of the only militant actions of the strike as they burned government-owned cars, threatened to burn government buildings and ransacked Tonga College in response to authorities not taking action. It was also done in protest of the dismissal of the school's principal and other senior faculty for supporting the strike, who they demanded be given their positions back.

In late August, the Tongan parliament suggested to the government that the PSA's demands be granted, but the cabinet did not approve. Negotiations occurred twice more, with the first utilizing a judge from New Zealand as a mediator and ending only after three days when the PSA stated they would strike until their demands were met. On 1 September, the Prime Minister, the Princess Regent, and the cabinet joined strikers at Pangai SiʻI.

== Outcome ==
Many of the PSA leaders saw the strike as an opportunity to address the systemic issues found within the representative government of Tonga, specifically the potential of allowing, creating, and developing trade unions for Tongan workers. The deputy chairman of the strike committee for the PSA, Malio Takai, mentioned that the strike made it hard to not engage in dialogue about the political structures the government had not changed since 1875.

A further expansion of strike demands was made, with new calls for the resignation of the King's cabinet as well as the opportunity to vote for a democratically elected parliament. After a few months of back and forth between PSA demands and Parliament's counter-offers, on 3 September, the Tongan government agreed upon the PSA's original demand for a 60–80% wage increase for workers, no disciplinary actions against individuals who participated in the strike, as well as a suspension of salary reviews. The government also offered the chance for Tongan workers and the PSA to negotiate further if they were not satisfied with the offer. The PSA agreed upon the full terms and conditions and offered to immediately return to work on 5 September 2005.

The day before they were scheduled to return to work (4 September), Tonga's political cabinet made a series of pledges, these include a pledge to consider allowing the establishment and development of unions, a pledge to consider the establishment of a royal commission to review the Constitution of 1875 and update its terms, as well as a pledge to find ways to make the country more democratic. The strike also caused New Zealand to pressure Tonga to make democratic reforms, as the cabinet had promised. The government then aimed to become a constitutional monarchy and planned a more representative election in 2010.

Georges Benguigui, a French sociologist and member of the French National Centre for Scientific Research, stated that the 2005 strike was a possible "trigger" event for the Nukuʻalofa riots that occurred in 2006, where eight people died.
