= Havea Tui'ha'ateiho =

Tongan politician (1910–1962)

Deputy Premier
- In office 1953–1960

Minister of Works
- In office 1949–1960

Minister of Lands and Works
- In office 1946–1949

Acting Minister of Police
- In office 1946

Personal details
- Born: 17 March 1910
- Died: 4 February 1962 (aged 51)

Hon. Havea Tui'ha'ateiho OBE (17 March 1910 – 4 February 1962) was a Tongan nobleman and politician. He held several ministerial posts, including serving as Deputy Premier.

== Biography ==
Tui'ha'ateiho was born Sione Fatukimotulalo, the son of Hon. Havea Tui'ha'ateiho Kelepi Fulilangi Havea (1874–1940) and Sinalauli'i Mafile'o (1878–1928). He was educated at Tupou College and Newington College in Australia, where he studied under the name John Fatu from 1919 until 1922.

In 1923 he joined the civil service, working as a clerk. He became Governor of Vavaʻu in 1929, and then Governor of Haʻapai in 1932. In 1933 he married Leafa'itulangi Seumanutafa, the daughter of a Samoan Chief.

Tui'ha'ateiho joined the cabinet of Tonga in 1946 as Acting Minister of Police. In the same year he was appointed Minister of Lands and Works. In 1949 he became Minister of Works, before being appointed Deputy Premier in 1953, retiring from that post in 1960.

Tui'ha'ateiho died in February 1962 and was given a state funeral.
