= Dulcie Tei =

Tongan politician

Member of the Tongan Parliament for Tongatapu 6
- Incumbent
- Assumed office 3 November 2022
- Preceded by: Poasi Tei

Dulcie Elaine Tei is a Tongan politician and Member of the Legislative Assembly of Tonga. She is married to former Deputy Prime Minister Poasi Tei.

She was first elected to Parliament in the 2022 Tongatapu 7 by-election, succeeding her husband who had been unseated for corruption.
