= Penisimani Fifita =

Tongan politician

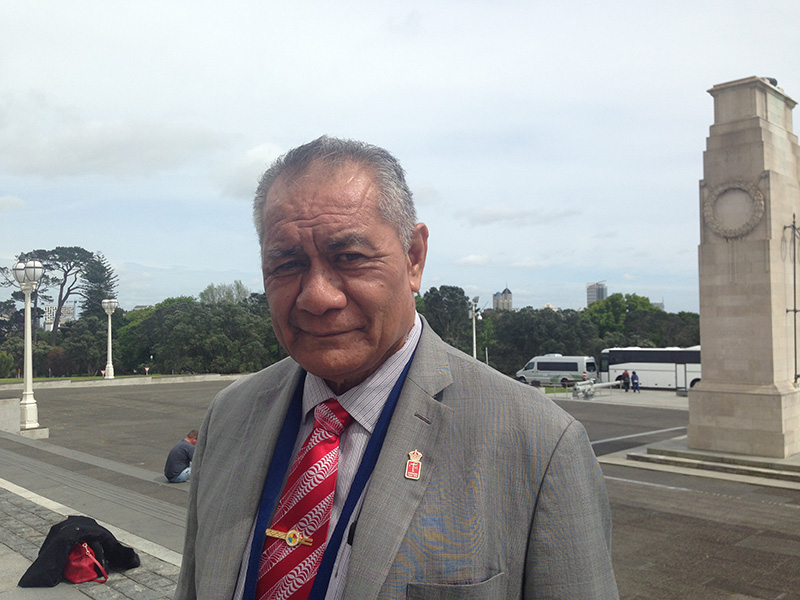
- Penisimani Fifita in 2016

Minister of Internal Affairs
- In office 17 October 2016 – 16 January 2017
- Prime Minister: ʻAkilisi Pōhiva
- Preceded by: Fe’ao Vakatā
- Succeeded by: ʻAkilisi Pōhiva

Minister of Education
- In office 16 January 2017 – 10 October 2019
- Preceded by: ʻAkilisi Pōhiva
- Succeeded by: Siaosi Sovaleni

Member of Parliament for Tongatapu 9
- In office 27 November 2014 – 18 November 2021
- Preceded by: Falisi Tupou
- Succeeded by: Sevenitini Toumoʻua

Personal details
- Party: Democratic Party of the Friendly Islands

Penisimani 'Epenisa Fifita is a Tongan politician and former Member of the Legislative Assembly of Tonga. He is a member of the Democratic Party of the Friendly Islands.

Before entering politics Fifita worked as a teacher, lecturer, and a public servant for Tonga's Ministry of Internal Affairs. He was first elected at the 2014 Tongan general election. He served as Chairman of the Committee of the Whole House, and in October 2016 was made Minister of Internal Affairs. In January 2017 he became Minister of Education. He was re-elected at the 2017 election and retained his portfolio. In 2018, he caused a public controversy by banning Tongan schoolgirls from playing rugby.

Following the death of ʻAkilisi Pōhiva and his replacement by Pohiva Tuʻiʻonetoa in October 2019 he was not reappointed to Tuʻiʻonetoa's new Cabinet.

He lost his seat in the 2021 Tongan general election.
