= William Garfield Bagnall =

Tongan minister

Minister of Finance
- In office January 1919 – July 1939
- Monarch: Sālote Tupou III
- Succeeded by: Horace E. Nicolson

Personal details
- Born: 31 January 1882; Turua, New Zealand
- Died: 17 August 1957 (aged 74); Auckland, New Zealand

William Garfield Bagnall (31 January 1882 – 17 August 1957) was a New Zealander who served as Minister of Finance of Tonga between 1919 and 1939.

== Biography ==
Bagnall was born in Turua in 1882, and moved to Tonga whilst working as a purser on the Ysabel schooner. He initially worked for the Vines Utting and Purston trading firm, before joining the Postal Department. He also owned a plantation on Tongatapu. He married Lilly Riechelmann from Nukuʻalofa. The couple had an adopted son.

Bagnall rose within the civil service to become Treasurer, before being appointed Minister of Finance in January 1919, also becoming a member of the Legislative Assembly. The presence of four Europeans in key positions (Herbert Cecil Stronge as Chief Justice, James Darrell Wall as Auditor-General and Alexander Brooke Wallace as Minister for Public Works) led to a rebellion by opposition MPs, who held a majority in the Assembly. However, despite going on strike in 1920, their demand that Bagnall be removed from office was refused by Queen Sālote.

During his time as Minister of Finance, Bagnall became the second-highest ranking person in European social circles after the British consul, and his wife occasionally acted as Sālote's social secretary. However, when a new Chief Justice William Hemming Stuart arrived in 1938, Bagnall fell foul of his new ministerial colleague. After refusing to pay for Stuart's excess fares and baggage fees upon his arrival, Bagnall's presence in the house previously reserved for chief justices, and his speeches to the Privy Council in Tongan (which Stuart could not understand) led to a feud between the two. Stuart claimed that Tonga was ruled by a camarilla, which included Bagnall. As a result of Stuart's repeated attacks on Bagnall, meetings of the cabinet and Privy Council had to be suspended by Sālote.

When a treasury clerk named Uliti was convicted of embezzlement in May 1939, Stuart used his judgement to attack Bagnall and Prime Minister Viliami Tungī Mailefihi, claiming that Bagnall had committed perjury and had been involved in the theft. The judgement stated that Bagnall had been having an affair with a cousin of Uliti, who had acted as a go-between. As a result, when Bagnall investigated Uliti over the missing funds, Uliti had held influence over him.

On the same day that the judgement was released, Sālote asked the British High Commissioner Harry Luke to recall Stuart. However, a 1,100-signature petition was subsequently brought to Sālote requesting all ministers except Stuart and Sioape Kaho were sacked, and the British Colonial Office opined that Stuart's removal would give weight to the reports of malpractice. As a result, Sālote asked Bagnall for his resignation, which he gave on 21 July. Two days earlier a bill had been presented in the Legislative Assembly to impeach him.

== Later life and death ==
After retiring Bagnall moved to Auckland. He died in hospital at the age of 74 in 1957.
