= Sione Ngongo Kioa =

Tongan diplomat

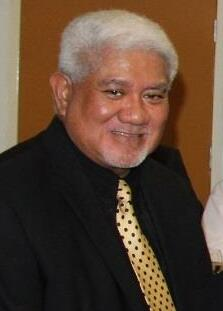
- Kioa in 2017

Governor of National Reserve Bank of Tonga
- In office 21 August 2013 – 10 October 2022
- Preceded by: Siosi Cocker Mafi
- Succeeded by: Tatafu Moeaki

Personal details
- Born: 14 April 1959 (age 67)
- Education: Australian National University; University of the South Pacific

Sione Ngongo Kioa (born 14 April 1959) is a Tongan diplomat and civil servant. From 2013 to 2022 he served as governor of National Reserve Bank of Tonga.

After graduating from Tailulu College, Ngongo attended the University of the South Pacific in Suva, Fiji, where he studied mathematics and economics, and later earned his Doctor of Philosophy in Economics at the Australian National University in Canberra, Australia.

From 1992 to 1996 Ngongo was the Deputy Director of Central Planning, and from 1996 to 1999 he served in Washington, D.C. as Assistant Executive Director at the International Monetary Fund. After returning to Tonga in 2001, he was appointed as the Director of Fiscal and Economic Policies at the Ministry of Finance. In 2002 he became the Project Manager of the Reconstruction and Rehabilitation Operation of Cyclone Waka.

From 2002 to 2005 Ngongo was General Manager of Leiola Duty Free Shops as well as the President of the Tonga Chamber of Commerce & Industries in Nuku’alofa. His appointment as Tongan High Commissioner to the United Kingdom was announced by the Ministry of Foreign Affairs on 21 November 2005, replacing Viela Tupou in the post.

He was the High Commissioner of the Kingdom of Tonga to the United Kingdom from 2006 to 2012. He was also concurrently accredited as Ambassador Extraordinary and Plenipotentiary of Tonga to the Russian Federation, Germany, the Netherlands, Denmark, Italy, Luxembourg, Switzerland, Belgium, and the European Union.

Effective 21 August 2013, Ngongo was appointed Governor of the National Reserve Bank of Tonga, the central bank. His first term lasted until 2018. He stepped down in October 2022. Since 1 March 2022, he has been Chairman of the Shared Board Transport Sector.

== Honours ==
National honours

- Order of Queen Sālote Tupou III, Grand Cross (31 July 2008).
