= Tongatapu 4 =

Electoral constituency in Tonga

- Constituency for the Legislative Assembly of Tonga
- Region: Tongatapu

Current constituency
- Created: 2010
- Number of members: 1
- Party: Independent
- Member(s): Tatafu Moeaki

Tongatapu 4 is an electoral constituency for the Legislative Assembly in the Kingdom of Tonga. It was established for the November 2010 general election, when the multi-seat regional constituencies for People's Representatives were replaced by single-seat constituencies, electing one representative via the first past the post electoral system. Located on the country's main island, Tongatapu, it encompasses part of Maʻufanga (a district of the capital city, Nukuʻalofa), and the entirety of the villages of Houmakelikao, ʻAnana, ʻUmisi, Fangaloto, Popua, Patangata, Nukunukumotu, Tukutonga, and Pangaimotu.

Its first ever representative was ʻIsileli Pulu, of the Democratic Party of the Friendly Islands. Pulu was first elected to the Assembly in 2002, and in 2010 began his fourth term as MP, in this new constituency. He was elected with an overwhelming majority, appearing to make this, at present, a safe seat for the party. After the election, he was appointed Minister for Education. For the 2014 election, Pulu was deselected by the party, and stood as an independent. The DPFI endorsed Mateni Tapueluelu, who retained the seat for the party. Tapueluelu retained the seat in 2017, but lost to independent Tatafu Moeaki in the 2021 election.

== Members of Parliament ==
Election	Member	Party
2010	ʻIsileli Pulu	Democratic Party of the Friendly Islands
2014	Mateni Tapueluelu	Democratic Party of the Friendly Islands
2017	Mateni Tapueluelu	Democratic Party of the Friendly Islands
2021	Tatafu Moeaki	independent

== Election results ==
=== 2010 ===
Tongan general election, 2010: Tongatapu 4
Party	Candidate	Votes	%	±%
DPFI	ʻIsileli Pulu	1274	58.3	n/a
(unknown)	ʻEtika Koka	302	13.8	n/a
(unknown)	ʻAhongalu Fusimalohi	223	10.2	n/a
(unknown)	ʻEtuate ʻEniti Sakalia	215	9.8	n/a
(unknown)	Tupou Lotoʻaniu	74	3.4	n/a
(unknown)	Mele Tonga Savea Linda Maʻu	71	3.2	n/a
(unknown)	Christopher Mafi	24	1.1	n/a
Turnout		2185		
Majority		972	44.5	n/a
DPFI win (new seat)				

== See also ==
- Constituencies of Tonga
