= Tēvita Fatafehi Puloka =

Tongan politician and civil servant

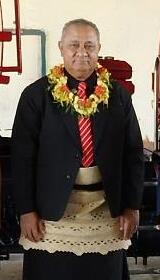
- Puloka in 2021

Member of Parliament for Tongatapu 1
- Incumbent
- Assumed office 18 November 2021
- Preceded by: Siaosi Pōhiva

Tēvita Fatafehi Puloka is a Tongan politician.

Puloka runs a construction business. He was first elected to the Legislative Assembly of Tonga in the 2021 Tongan general election, winning the Tongatapu 1 seat from Siaosi Pōhiva. He subsequently supported Siaosi Sovaleni for Prime Minister. While offered a cabinet position, he decided to remain outside cabinet.

He was re-elected at the 2025 election.
