= 2011 Tongatapu 9 by-election =

By-election to the Tongan parliament

Tongatapu 9 by-election
- 15 September 2011
Candidate	Falisi Tupou	Sevenitini Toumoʻua	Viliami Fukofuka
Party	DPFI	(unknown)	(unknown)
Popular vote	745	483	469
Percentage	32.8%	21.3%	20.7%

A by-election was held in the Tongatapu 9 constituency of Tonga on 15 September 2011. It was triggered by the death of the incumbent, the first time MP Kaveinga Faʻanunu, who died of head and neck cancer on 24 July. Under the first past the post system, Faʻanunu had won the newly established single-member seat for the Democratic Party of the Friendly Islands in the November 2010 general election, with 34% of the vote, and a majority of 494 votes (18.5%), appearing to make it a relatively safe seat for the party (which was a junior partner in Lord Tuʻivakano's government).

== Candidates ==
On 18 August, the Tongan government announced that six candidates had been registered for the by-election, without however specifying what political party any of them might be a member of. They were Konisitutone Simana Kamii, Siaosi ʻEnosi Tuʻipulotu, Viliami Fukofuka, Sevenitini Toumoʻua, ʻEpeli Taufa Kalimani, and Falisi Tupou. The first five had stood unsuccessfully in the November general election – most notably Sevenitini Toumoʻua, who had finished second to Faʻanunu with 15.5% of the vote.

== Result ==
Falisi Tupou, the candidate of the Democratic Party of the Friendly Islands, won the seat with 32.8% of the vote.

Tongatapu 9 by-election, 2011
Party	Candidate	Votes	%	±%
Democrats	Falisi Tupou	745	32.83%	−1.2%
(unknown)	Sevenitini Toumoʻua	483	21.29%	+5.8%
(unknown)	Viliami Fukofuka	469	20.67%	+10.9%
(unknown)	Siaosi ʻEnosi Tuʻipulotu	254	11.20%	+5.7%
(unknown)	ʻEpeli Taufa Kalemani	199	8.77%	+6.9%
(unknown)	Konisitutone Simana Kami	119	5.24%	+3.3%
Turnout		2,269	76.68%	
Majority		262	11.55%	−7%
Democrats hold		Swing	-1.2%	

== 2010 result ==
Tongan general election, 2010: Tongatapu 9
Party	Candidate	Votes	%	±%
Democrats	Kaveinga Faʻanunu	908	34.0	
(unknown)	Sevenitini Toumoʻua	414	15.5	
(unknown)	Viliami Fukofuka	262	9.8	
(unknown)	Filimone Fifita	241	9.0	
(unknown)	ʻAisake ʻEtimoni Tuʻiono	229	8.6	
(unknown)	Siaosi ʻEnosi Tuʻipulotu	147	5.5	
(unknown)	Semisi Kailahi	136	5.1	
(unknown)	Tonga Tongilava Lemoto	110	4.1	
(unknown)	ʻEpeli Taufa Kalemani	51	1.9	
(unknown)	Konisitutone Simana Kami	50	1.9	
(unknown)	Falati Papani	49	1.8	
(unknown)	Mosese Latu	22	0.8	
(unknown)	Sione ʻUmeahola Faeamani	21	0.8	
(unknown)	ʻOfa Fatai	18	0.7	
(unknown)	Samisoni Lotaki Kanongataʻa	15	0.6	
Turnout		2673		
Majority		494	18.5	
Democrats win (new seat)				
