= Sevenitini Toumoʻua =

Tongan politician

Minister for Infrastructure
- Incumbent
- Assumed office 28 December 2021
- Prime Minister: Siaosi Sovaleni
- Preceded by: ʻAkosita Lavulavu

Member of Parliament for Tongatapu 9
- Incumbent
- Assumed office 18 November 2021
- Preceded by: Penisimani Fifita

Sevenitini Toumoʻua is a Tongan politician and Cabinet Minister.

== Politics ==
He was a candidate in the 2011 Tongatapu 9 by-election.

He was elected to the Legislative Assembly of Tonga at the 2021 Tongan general election. On 28 December 2021 he was appointed to the Cabinet of Siaosi Sovaleni as Minister for Infrastructure.

He was re-elected at the 2025 election.
