= Tevita Motulalo =

Military and international security strategist and journalist

Tevita Motulalo, also known as Dave Motulalo, is a military and international security strategist, and journalist. He is Deputy Editor of Tonga's Koe Kele'a newspaper, Editor of the Tonga Herald, Host of the weekly geopolitics radio show 'Tonga and the World', and a journalism professor at the Tonga Institute of Higher Education.

Tevita Motulalo is the Director of the Royal Oceania Institute, an independent, non-partisan think tank founded in the Kingdom of Tonga in March, 2016. The Institute has the Crown Prince Tupouto'a as Patron, and Lord Fakafanua as Chair. The Institute is geared to tackle strategic challenges facing Tonga, the South Pacific region, and beyond.

Formerly he was Editor of the Tonga Chronicle and Deputy Editor of the Talaki, one of the Kingdom's main Tongan-language newspapers. He has a M.Sc. from the Department of Geopolitics at Manipal University, India, and is a Senior Researcher at Gateway House (the Indian Council on Global Relations). Gateway House published his Report India's Strategic Engagement in the South Pacific. He contributes widely to media in Tonga (in English and in Tongan), as well as abroad.
