= Kalafi Moala =

Tongan journalist

- Born: 1947 or 1948 (age 77–78)
- Occupation: Journalist
- Years active: 1989–present
- Employer: Radio New Zealand (current)
- Known for: Founder of Times of Tonga

Kalafi Moala is a Tongan journalist who founded the Times of Tonga, and was later jailed by the Tongan government for contempt of parliament. He later worked for Radio New Zealand and founded an investigative journalism website.

== Biography ==
Before becoming a journalist, Moala worked as a Christian missionary in Hawaii, Hong Kong, Japan and Papua New Guinea.

In 1989, Moala founded the Times of Tonga, an independent newspaper, becoming its majority shareholder and editor-in-chief. In 1996, the Legislative Assembly of Tonga sentenced him and his deputy editor-in-chief to one month in prison for contempt of parliament, after the Times of Tonga published the text of a no confidence motion against justice minister Tevita Poasi Tupou. ʻAkilisi Pōhiva, a pro-democracy politician who proposed the motion and delivered its text to the paper, was also given the same sentence. Amnesty International called for their release, describing them as prisoners of conscience. While in prison, Moala continued to write articles on toilet paper to smuggle out to visitors for publication. The three were released four days ahead of schedule after the chief justice of Tonga ruled that their imprisonment was unconstitutional.

In 2003, the Times of Tonga was banned by the government from being distributed in Tonga. ʻEseta Fusituʻa, a government spokesperson, maintained that the newspaper was legally a foreign product as Moala was at the time based in New Zealand and had US citizenship. Moala took issue with the government's description, describing it as "crazy" and "quite insulting" to him as a native Tongan. The ban was lifted in 2004. In 2009, Moala acquired the Tonga Chronicle, the country's oldest newspaper, from the state.

In 2014, Moala launched a talk radio station known as Leʻo ʻo Tonga ("Voice of Tonga"), which he said would be a "pro democracy station". He briefly worked as a media adviser to Pōhiva and his Democratic Party of the Friendly Islands, which gained power at the end of the year. Moala later distanced himself from Pōhiva's government, calling for his resignation in 2017 for "incompetence" and attacks on the media.

In 2019, Moala sold his newspaper and radio station to go into what he described as "semi-retirement". He later joined Radio New Zealand, becoming its Tonga correspondent. In 2021, he founded Talanoa ‘o Tonga, an investigative journalism website. In March 2024, Moala described King Tupou VI's revocation of the appointment of Siaosi Sovaleni as armed forces minister as a "retrograde step".

In September 2024, Moala was elected president of the Pacific Islands News Association, a regional association of media outlets in the Pacific region.
