= Tevita Poasi Tupou =

Tongan Jurist

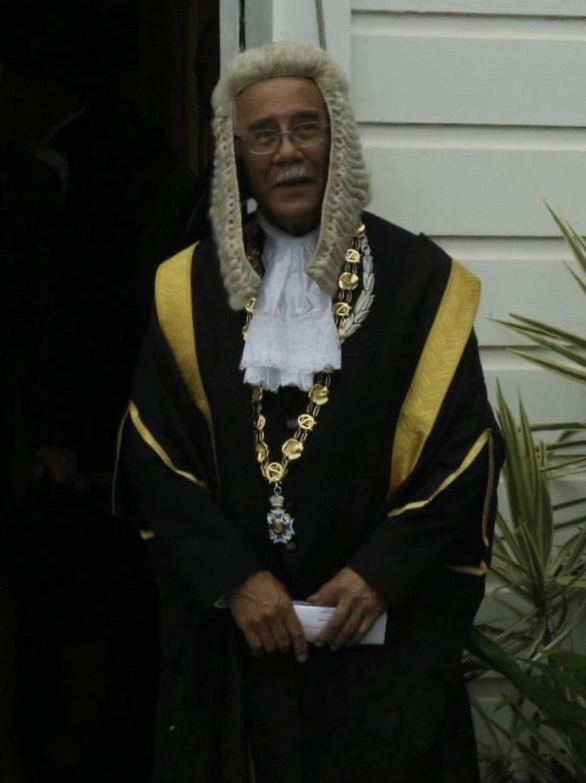
- Lord Tupou at the State Opening of Parliament in May 2015

Deputy Prime Minister of Tonga
- In office 2000–2001
- Preceded by: Langi Kavaliku
- Succeeded by: Clive Edwards (acting)

Attorney General of Tonga
- In office 1988–2001
- Succeeded by: ʻAisea Taumoepeau

Tevita Poasi Tupou (born 27 July 1941), also known as David Tupou, styled Lord Tupou of Kolofo‘ou, is a Tongan judge and former politician. He was the first Tongan admitted to the bar in New Zealand.

== Biography ==
Tupou was educated in New Zealand, attending Wesley Preparatory School and Wesley Training College. He was granted a Tongan government scholarship to study law at the University of Auckland, on the condition that he return to Tonga and work for the government for three years. On graduation he became the first Tongan admitted as a barrister in New Zealand. In 1965 he took up a British government bursary to study law for a further two years in London. He returned to Tonga in 1968, and immediately took up a position as assistant crown solicitor. He married Saane Tufui the same year. From 1969 to 1972 he was first secretary at the Tongan High Commission in London. He later served as crown solicitor.

In 1988 he was appointed Attorney General of Tonga and Minister of Justice.

In 1996 Tupou attended the 1996 Summer Olympics in Atlanta, Georgia as head of the country's Olympic team. He did not have the approval of the Speaker of the Legislative Assembly for leaving the country, and opposition MP ʻAkilisi Pōhiva filed impeachment proceedings against him for neglecting his parliamentary duties while receiving his salary. Pohiva and journalists Kalafi Moala and Filokalafi ʻAkauʻola were subsequently jailed for thirty days for contempt of parliament for publishing news of the impeachment motion before it had been filed, creating an international uproar. The Legislative Assembly voted to begin impeachment proceedings, but the trial was delayed when king Tāufaʻāhau Tupou IV prorogued parliament.

He later served as Deputy Prime Minister. He resigned in 2001 following a financial scandal involving the sale of passports and the subsequent loss of the funds by court jester Jesse Bogdonoff.

In 2008, King George Tupou V elevated him to the title of life peer and appointed him Law Lord (judge) in the newly formed Judicial Committee of the Privy Council. On 3 December 2010, the king appointed Tupou as interim Speaker.

In October 2014, Tupou was appointed as Judge in the Appeal Court of Tonga, making him the first Tongan in the panel.

In June 2015 he was inducted into the Tonga National Sports Hall of Fame for his services on the Tonga Sports Association and National Olympic Committee.

== Honours ==
- Order of Queen Sālote Tupou III, Grand Cross (31 July 2008)
