= ʻIsileli Pulu =

Tongan politician

Minister for Labour, Commerce and Industries
- In office 1 September 2011 – 25 June 2012
- Prime Minister: Lord Tuʻivakanō
- Preceded by: Lisiate ‘Akolo
- Succeeded by: Viliami Latu

Minister for Tourism
- In office 5 January 2011 – 1 September 2011
- Succeeded by: Viliami Latu

Member of Parliament for Tongatapu 4
- In office 26 November 2010 – 27 November 2014
- Preceded by: none (constituency established)

Personal details
- Born: 15 May 1957 (age 69)

‘Isileli Pulu (born 15 May 1957) is a Tongan politician and former Member of the Tongan Parliament. He is a member of the Human Rights and Democracy Movement and the Democratic Party of the Friendly Islands.

== Biography ==
He has a bachelor's degree in business administration from Charles Sturt University (Australia).

Pulu was first elected to Parliament for the island of Tongatapu in 2001. He had previously run in the 1999 election, but was unsuccessful.

In 1999 Pulu was convicted of defamation and fined $1,500 for a letter to the Times of Tonga in which he referred to the king as a pig.

In 2002 Pulu was charged with sedition and forgery over the publication of a letter claiming king Taufa‘ahau Tupou IV had a secret fortune. He was acquitted by a jury in May 2003. In 2003, he challenged then-Police Minister Clive Edwards' use of police housing. He also opposed government plans for a media clampdown aimed at preventing criticism from the Times of Tonga.

After the 2006 Nuku‘alofa riots Pulu was accused of encouraging the riot and inciting two men to burn down the Shoreline building, in which eight people were killed. He was arrested in January 2007 and charged with abetting murder and arson, and sedition. He was acquitted of the former charges by a jury in July 2008. The sedition charges against him and a number of other pro-democracy MPs were dismissed in September 2009.

Pulu was elected to the seat of Tongatapu 4 in the 2010 elections. Following the election and selection of a Prime Minister he accepted the position of Minister of Education in the new Cabinet. On September 1, 2011, he was reshuffled to the Ministry for Labour, Commerce and Industries. In late June 2012, he -along with two other ministers- resigned from the Cabinet, so as to support a motion of no confidence tabled by his party (DPFI) against the government.

He was not re-elected at the 2014 Tongan general election. He stood again in the 2022 Tongatapu 4 by-election.
