= Siosiua ʻUtoikamanu =

Tongan politician

Minister of Finance
- In office January 2001 – 25 February 2008
- Prime Minister: ʻAhoʻeitu ʻUnuakiʻotonga Tukuʻaho; Feleti Sevele
- Preceded by: Tutoatasi Fakafanua
- Succeeded by: Feleti Sevele

Governor of National Reserve Bank of Tonga
- In office July 1991 – May 2003
- Preceded by: Alan E. Gee
- Succeeded by: Siosi Cocker Mafi

Siosiua Tuitalukua Tupou ʻUtoikamanu is a Tongan politician and former Cabinet Minister. He was Tonga's Minister of Finance from 2001 to 2008.

ʻUtoikamanu was governor of the National Reserve Bank of Tonga from 1991 to 2003. He was appointed as Minister of Finance in a cabinet reshuffle in January 2001. Shortly after being appointed he faced an impeachment motion in parliament over the loss of money from the Tonga Trust Fund. In his role as head of customs, he was responsible for the Tongan government's efforts to ban the independent newspaper the Times of Tonga.

As Finance Minister he pursued a program of economic reform, including the introduction of a goods and services tax. In 2005 efforts to reform the public service by introducing new pay scales with increases only for senior public servants led to a six week long strike which shut down and threatened to topple the government. The strike resulted in 60 to 80 percent pay increases for most public servants. ʻUtoikamanu responded to the resulting budget pressures by proposing further privatisations and public service cuts. Following the 2006 Nukuʻalofa riots he negotiated a loan from China to rebuild the city's CBD. The loan later led to significant controversy, with a parliamentary committee finding it was illegal and that the funds had been misappropriated. He was forced to resign as a Minister in February 2008 after refusing to cooperate with other members of the Cabinet.

After leaving politics ʻUtoikamanu served as director of the Pacific Islands Centre for Public Administration at the University of the South Pacific. In July 2016 he was elected to the Legal and Technical Commission of the International Seabed Authority. On 26 May 2022 he was appointed to the Privy Council of Tonga.
