= Tiofilusi Tiueti =

Tongan politician

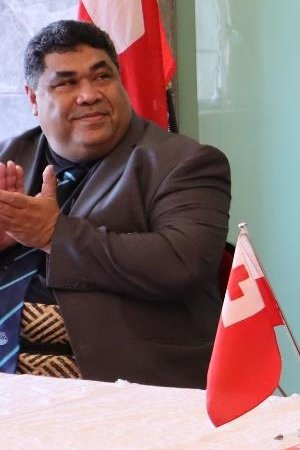
- Tiueti in 2023

Minister of Finance
- In office 20 October 2022 – 28 January 2025
- Prime Minister: Siaosi Sovaleni
- Preceded by: Tatafu Moeaki
- Succeeded by: ʻAisake Eke

Minister for Revenue and Customs
- In office 20 October 2022 – 28 January 2025
- Preceded by: Tatafu Moeaki
- Succeeded by: Mateni Tapueluelu

Tiofilusi Tiueti is a Tongan civil servant, politician, and former Cabinet Minister.

Tiueti has previously worked as a civil servant. He was chief executive of Tonga's Ministry of Finance until 2013, when he moved to a position at the World Bank. In May 2015 he was appointed as chief executive of the Pacific Association of Supreme Audit Institutions, a role he held until May 2020. He then served on PASAI's secretariat until September 2022.

On 20 October 2022 he was appointed Minister of Finance and Minister of Revenue and Customs, replacing Tatafu Moeaki who had been unseated for bribery.
