= Falisi Tupou =

Tongan politician

Member of Parliament for Tongatapu 9
- In office 15 September 2011 – 27 November 2014
- Preceded by: Kaveinga Faʻanunu
- Succeeded by: Penisimani Fifita
- Majority: 11.5%

Personal details
- Party: Democratic Party of the Friendly Islands

Falisi Tupou is a Tongan journalist and politician.

He is a senior editor at Keleʻa, the newspaper of the pro-democracy movement, owned by ʻAkilisi Pohiva. In April 2007, he was arrested and charged with sedition over an editorial in which he was accused of describing the King as utukovi ("bad brain"). In April 2009, he was co-defendant in a civil defamation case brought by Prime Minister Feleti Sevele against the newspaper, which was found liable.

In September 2011, he was selected as the candidate of the Democratic Party of the Friendly Islands to stand in the by-election to the Tongatapu 9 seat in the Legislative Assembly. The seat had been won in the November 2010 general election by DPFI candidate Kaveinga Faʻanunu, who had died of cancer seven months later. Tupou retained the seat for the party, winning 32.8% of the vote and seeing off the other five candidates with a comfortable margin.

Tupou was not re-elected at the 2014 election.
