= Minister of Finance of Tonga =

Minister of Finance
- Incumbent; Vika Lavemaau since 17 August 2026
- Formation: January 1919
- First holder: William Garfield Bagnall

Ministry of Finance building in Nuku'alofa

Minister of Finance is the person in charge of the Ministry of Finance of Tonga.

== Ministers ==
- William Garfield Bagnall, January 1919 - July 1939
- Horace E. Nicolson, 1939 - 1949
- George Goodacre, 1950 - 1961
- Mahe 'Uli'uli Tupouniua, 1961 - 1982
- Sione Tapa (acting September 1970 to May 1971, November 1972 to January 1981)
- James Cecil Cocker, 1982 - 1991
- Tutoatasi Fakafanua, 1991 - 2000 (Tutoatasi Kinikinilau Fakafanua)
- Siosiua 'Utoikamanu, 2001 - 2008 (Siosiua Tuitalukua Tupou 'Utoikamanu)
- 'Otenifi Afu'alo Matoto, 2008 - 2010
- Sunia Manu Fili, 2010 - April 2012
- Lisiate 'Akolo, April 2012 - December 2013
- ʻAisake Eke, January 2014 - March 2017
- Tevita Lavemaau, March 2017 - January 2018
- Pohiva Tu'i'onetoa, January 2018 - October 2019
- Tevita Lavemaau, October 2019 - 28 December 2021
- Tatafu Moeaki, 28 December 2021 - August 2022
- Tiofilusi Tiueti, October 2022 - 28 January 2025
- ʻAisake Eke, 28 January 2025 - 31 December 2025
- Lataifaingata'a Tangimana, 23 January 2026 - 15 April 2026
- Vika Lavemaau, 17 August 2026 - Incumbent

== See also ==
- Government of Tonga
- Economy of Tonga
- National Reserve Bank of Tonga
