= International Dateline Hotel =

Hotel in Nukuʻalofa, Tonga

Coordinates: 21.1356°S 175.1947°W

General information
- Location: Nukuʻalofa, Tonga
- Opening: 1964

Other information
- Number of rooms: 126

Website
- http://www.tanoadateline.com/

The International Dateline Hotel is a hotel in Nukuʻalofa, the capital of Tonga, often used by guests of state. It was established in 1964 with 24 rooms by Janfull International Dateline Hotel Ltd., a joint venture between Tonga and China which according to Pacific Islands Report was the first entry by China into free-market Pacific tourism. The hotel was built to house visitors to the coronation of King Tāufaʻāhau Tupou IV and also marked the start of tourism to Tonga.

It was renovated and expanded in 2001–2003 with a Chinese loan, adding a new wing and redeveloping the waterfront, and again with Chinese funding in 2006. This added 30 rooms and a convention centre whose main conference hall holds 400 people and was built for the 38th Pacific Islands Forum.

Ownership was transferred to the government of Tonga in 2012 after the original hotel went into liquidation. Another renovation was begun in 2015 by the Tanoa Hotel Group with support from the government. The work was carried out by the Reddy Group. This preserved the original atmosphere of the public areas while modernising the rooms and added a pool bar, restaurant and spa area. It was reopened by King Tupou VI on 16 February 2017. Prime Minister ʻAkilisi Pōhiva said that "such project contributes heavily to economic development." Later in 2017, the hotel hosted the Commonwealth Observer Group to the 2017 Tongan general election.

The hotel has 120 rooms: 6 long term apartments, 4 ocean view suites, 43 superior rooms with balcony, 27 superior king rooms, 38 ocean view queen rooms, and 2 disable access rooms.
