= Tonga Development Bank =

Tonga Development Bank (TDB) is a development finance institution that promotes Tonga's economic and social advancement through a variety of banking services.

== Products and Microlending ==
Tonga Development Bank supplies loans, savings, cross border cash remittances (Ave Pa'anga Pau), domestic money transfer, promissory notes, and business advising. TDB also is the longest running provider of microloans in Tonga. For 16 years, the New Zealand Government has funded the Tonga Development Bank with approximately TOP$300,000. Lending targets 2 major groups; the disadvantaged borrowers and product diversification borrowers within the productive sectors; Agriculture, Industry & Business, Fishing and Women Development Groups.

Tonga Development Bank’s Micro Lending Product and facilities are aimed at advancing the development of key economic sectors in the country, especially small-scale farming and handicraft-making that involves women and youth groups. This product aims to promote small business initiatives and savings at villages especially people who have skills but have less or no collateral at all to pledge as loan security.

== History ==
TDB and was established on September 1, 1977 under TDB Act 1977 and was incorporated under the Companies Act at the time. TDB was registered again in 2001 under the Companies Act 1995.

== Awards ==
The Association of Development Financing Institutions in Asia and the Pacific (ADFIAP) announced Tonga Development Bank as the winner of its two (2) projects under the Category 8: Development Finance-led Poverty Alleviation in May 2010. Tonga Development Bank entered two projects: “New Zealand Borrowers’ Diversification Fund (NZBDF)” and “Micro Lending Product” and they were equally named as winning projects.

This ADFIAP Award 2010 given to Tonga Development Bank recognizes its efforts in successfully advancing economic and social development through innovative financing schemes that benefit poor and disadvantaged groups in the country.

== Networks ==
TDB is a member of the Association of Development Finance Institution in the Pacific (ADFIP), the Association of Development Finance Institution in Asia and the Pacific (ADFIAP), the Association of Banks in Tonga (ABT) and the Microfinance Pasifika Network.
