= National Reserve Bank of Tonga =

Central bank of Tonga

- Central bank of: Tonga
- Headquarters: Nukuʻalofa
- Established: 1 July 1989
- Ownership: 100% state ownership
- Governor: Tatafu Moeaki
- Currency: Tongan pa'anga TOP (ISO 4217)
- Reserves: 140 million USD
- Website: www.reservebank.to

The National Reserve Bank of Tonga (NRBT; Tongan: Pangikē Pule Fakafonua ʻo Tonga) is the central bank of Tonga. The Reserve Bank is responsible for regulating the issue and supply of domestic and international currency, as well as promoting monetary stability and economic development. It also advises the Ministry of Finance on banking and monetary matters, acts as the principal banker and fiscal agent of the Government of Tonga, and is responsible for the licensing and supervision of financial institutions. The current Governor is Tatafu Moeaki who succeeded Ngongo Kioa.

The NRBT actively promotes financial inclusion and is a member of the Alliance for Financial Inclusion.

The NRBT Building hosts the Embassy of Japan. It is one of the tallest buildings in Tonga, standing 18 meters (59 feet) tall.

== History ==
The National Reserve Bank of Tonga was established on 1 July 1989. It was preceded as monetary authority and holder of foreign reserves by Bank of Tonga, which was established in 1974.

== Governors ==
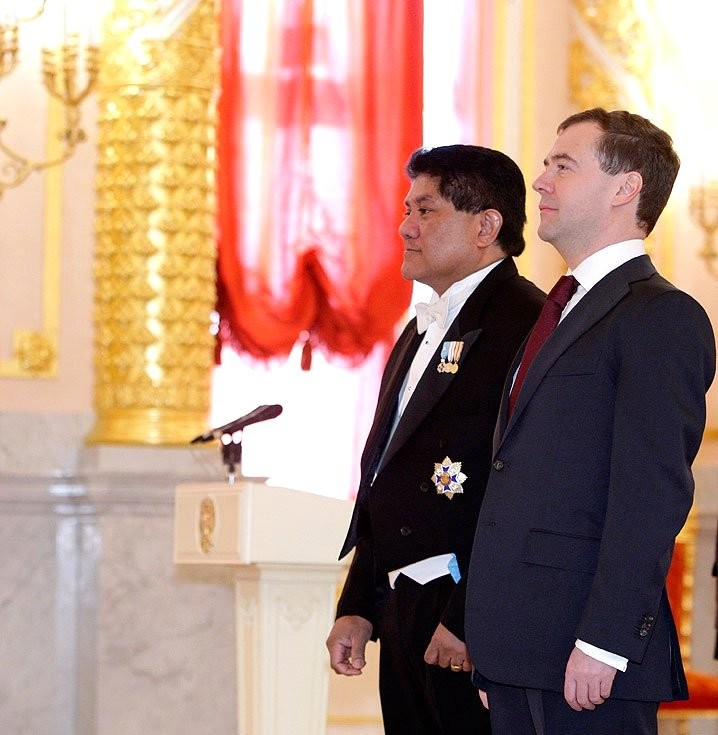
Sione Ngongo Kioa

Governor of the bank is appointed for renewable five-year terms.

1. Alan E. Gee, July 1989 - July 1991
2. Siosiua 'Utoikamanu, July 1991 – May 2003
3. Siosi Cocker Mafi, May 2003 – July 2013
4. Sione Ngongo Kioa, August 2013 — October 2022
5. Tatafu Moeaki, December 2022 — present

== See also ==
- Minister of Finance (Tonga)
- List of central banks
