= Semisi Tapueluelu =

Tongan politician (born 1949)

Semisi Palu ‘Ifoni Tapueluelu

Member of Parliament for Tongatapu 10
- In office 25 November 2010 – 27 November 2014
- Preceded by: none (constituency established)
- Succeeded by: Pohiva Tuʻiʻonetoa
- Majority: 6.0%

Personal details
- Born: 28 October 1949 (age 77)
- Party: Democratic Party of the Friendly Islands

Semisi Palu ‘Ifoni Tapueluelu (born October 28, 1949) more commonly known as Semisi Tapueluelu, is a Tongan politician. He is the father of Mateni Tapueluelu.

After working as a prisons superintendent, he went into politics. His career in national politics began when he was elected People's Representative for the tenth constituency of Tongatapu in the November 2010 general election. Standing as a candidate for the Democratic Party of the Friendly Islands, he obtained 26.6% of the vote, seeing off eleven other candidates.

In July 2014 Tapueluelu was dumped as a Democratic Party candidate. He ran as an independent in the 2014 Tongan general election, but was not re-elected.

== Honours ==
National honours

- Order of the Crown of Tonga, Member (6 July 2021).
