= 2019 Tongatapu 1 by-election =

A by-election was held in the Tongan electorate of Tongatapu 1 on 28 November 2019. The by-election was triggered by the death of MP ʻAkilisi Pōhiva on 12 September 2019. 'Akilisi Pōhiva's son, Siaosi Pōhiva, won the by-election.

== Results ==
Candidate	Votes	%
Siaosi Pōhiva	1,160	50.35
Netatua Pelesikoti Taufatofua	1,144	49.65
Total	2,304	100.00
Valid votes	2,304	99.96
Invalid/blank votes	1	0.04
Total votes	2,305	100.00
Registered voters/turnout	4,342	53.09
