= Poasi Tei =

Tongan politician (born 1967)

The Honourable Poasi Tei

Deputy Prime Minister of Tonga
- In office 28 December 2021 – 10 August 2022
- Prime Minister: Siaosi Sovaleni
- Preceded by: Lord Maʻafu
- Succeeded by: Vacant

Minister for Energy, Environment, Information and Climate Change
- In office 4 January 2018 – 10 August 2022
- Prime Minister: Siaosi Sovaleni; Pohiva Tuʻiʻonetoa ʻAkilisi Pōhiva
- Preceded by: Siaosi Sovaleni

Minister for Public Enterprises
- In office 28 December 2021 – 10 August 2022
- Prime Minister: Siaosi Sovaleni
- Preceded by: Pōhiva Tuʻiʻonetoa
- Succeeded by: Siaosi Sovaleni
- In office 30 December 2014 – 4 January 2018
- Prime Minister: ʻAkilisi Pōhiva
- Preceded by: Fe‘aomoeata Vakata
- Succeeded by: Saia Piukala

Member of Parliament for Tongatapu 6
- In office 27 November 2014 – 10 August 2022
- Preceded by: Siosifa Tuʻutafaiva
- Succeeded by: Dulcie Tei

Personal details
- Born: 4 October 1967 (age 58)
- Party: None

Poasi Mataele Tei (born 4 October 1967) is a Tongan politician and former Member of the Legislative Assembly of Tonga.

Tei was educated at the University of the South Pacific in Suva, Fiji, graduating with a Bachelor of Arts and an MBA. Before entering politics he worked for the Statistics Department, as an accountant for the Tonga Co-operative Federation, Pacific Finance and Investment, Tonga Water Board and Tonga Airport Limited.

== Political career ==
He was first elected to Parliament as a Democratic Party of the Friendly Islands candidate at the 2014 Tongan general election, and was appointed as Minister for Public Enterprises in the ʻAkilisi Pōhiva Cabinet. In 2015 he attempted to remove two nobles as directors of the Tonga Broadcasting Commission, but the decision was later overturned by the courts. He was re-elected at the 2017 election and appointed as Minister of Energy, Environment, Information and Climate Change (MEIDEEC).

Following the death of ʻAkilisi Pōhiva Tei supported Pohiva Tuʻiʻonetoa for Prime Minister. He retained his portfolios in the Tuʻiʻonetoa's Cabinet.

He was re-elected in the 2021 election. On 28 December 2021 he was appointed to the Cabinet of Siaosi Sovaleni as Deputy Prime Minister, Minister for Public Enterprises, and Minister for Meteorology, Energy, Information, Disaster Management, Environment, Communications and Climate Change (MEIDECC). On 13 May 2022 his election was declared void after the Supreme Court found him guilty of three counts of bribery in an election petition. The conviction was stayed pending appeal on 26 May 2022. On 9 August 2022 his appeal was dismissed, and his election confirmed as void. He was formally unseated by Parliament on 10 August. His wife Dulcie Elaine Tei won the resulting by-election.
