= Tongan paʻanga =

Currency of Tonga

Tonga paʻanga (Tongan)
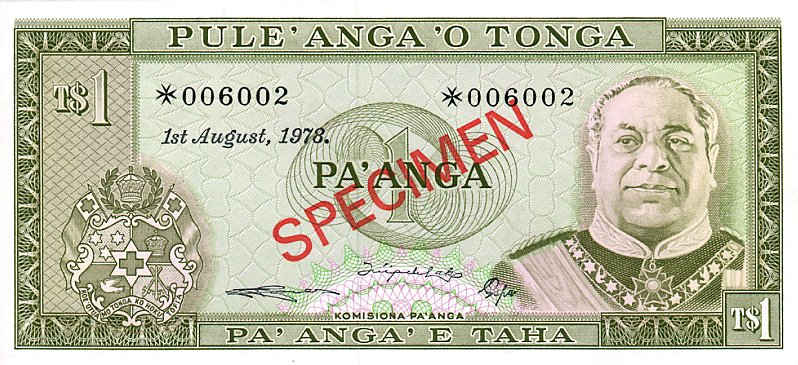
- 1 paʻanga

ISO 4217
- Code: TOP (numeric: 776)
- Subunit: 0.01

Unit
- Symbol: T$ (sometimes PT)

Denominations
- Superunit
- 100: hau
- Subunit
- 1/100: seniti
- Symbol
- seniti: ¢
- Banknotes: T$1, T$2, T$5, T$10, T$20, T$50, T$100
- Coins
- Freq. used: 5¢, 10¢, 20¢, 50¢, T$1
- Rarely used: 1¢, 2¢, T$2

Demographics
- Date of introduction: 3 April 1967
- Replaced: Tongan pound
- User(s): Tonga

Issuance
- Central bank: Board of Commissioners of Currency (1967-1989); National Reserve Bank of Tonga (1989-)
- Website: www.reservebank.to

Valuation
- Inflation: 4.5%
- Source: The World Factbook, 2012 est.

The paʻanga is the currency of Tonga. It is controlled by the National Reserve Bank of Tonga (Tongan: Pangikē Pule Fakafonua ʻo Tonga) in Nukuʻalofa. The paʻanga is not convertible and is pegged to a basket of currencies comprising the Australian, New Zealand, and United States dollars and the Japanese yen.

The paʻanga is subdivided into 100 seniti. The ISO code is TOP, and the usual abbreviation is T$ (¢ for seniti). In Tonga, the paʻanga is often referred to in English as "dollar", the seniti as the "cent" and the hau as the "union". The unit of hau (equivalent of 100 paʻanga) is not used in everyday life and can be found only on commemorative coins of higher denominations.

== Etymology ==
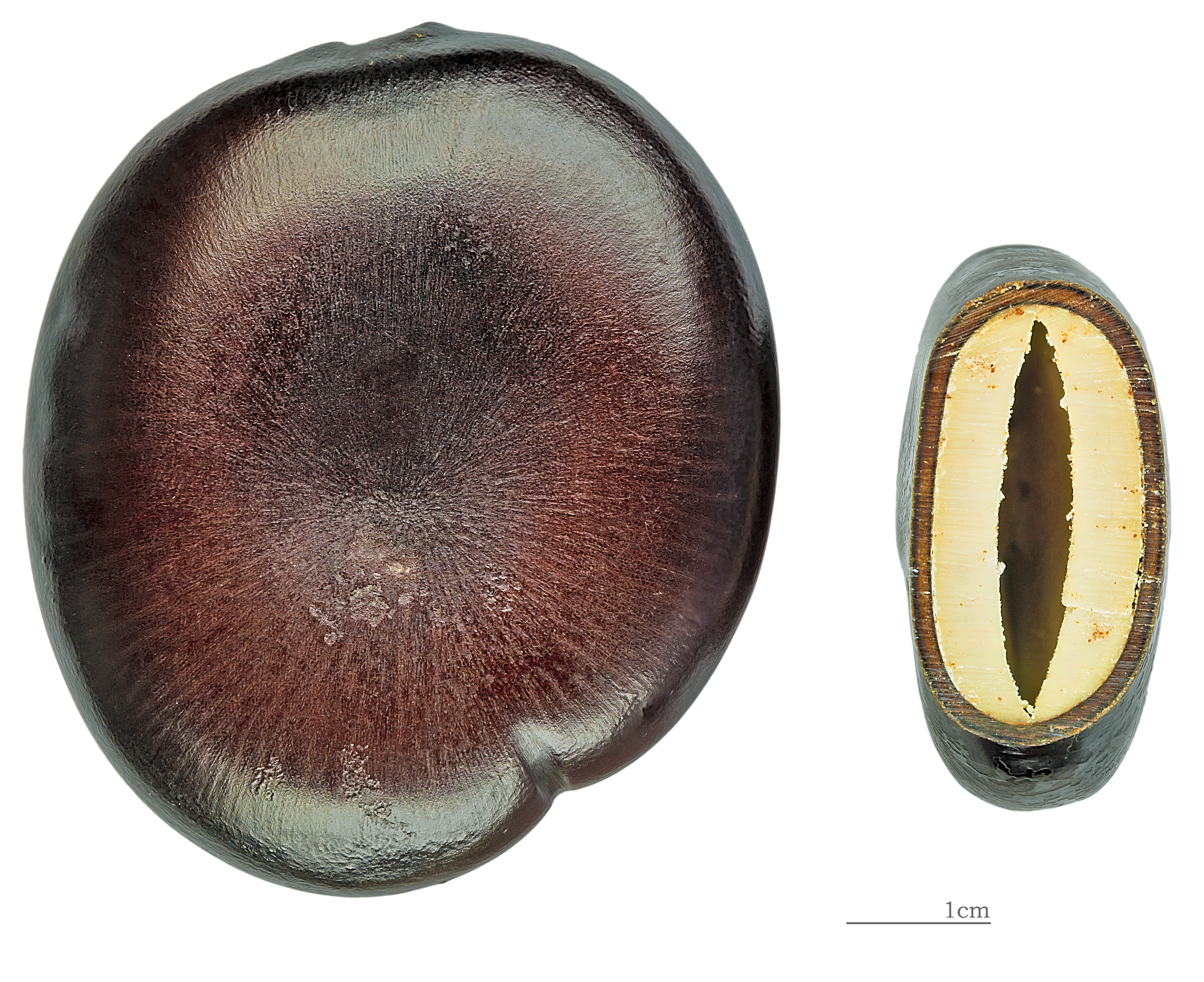
paʻanga bean

Paʻanga is the Tongan name for Entada phaseoloides, also called the box bean or St. Thomas's bean, a bean-like vine producing large pods with large reddish-brown seeds. The seeds are roundish, up to 5 cm diameter and 1 or 2 cm thick. When strung together they are used as anklets, part of the kailao dance costume. They were also used as playing pieces in an ancient disc-throwing game, lafo.

On 1 December 1806 Tongans attacked the passing ship Port-au-Prince near Lifuka in order to take it over. They failed, as the crew sank the vessel. The chief of Haʻapai, Fīnau ʻUlukālala, resorted to the next plan, to plunder whatever was worthwhile. On his inspection tour, he found the ship's cash. Not knowing what money was, he considered the coins as paʻanga. Finally, not seeing anything of value, he ordered the remains of the ship to be burned; most of the crew were also reported to be massacred. It was much later that William Mariner, the only survivor of this attack, told him that those pieces of metal were of great value and not merely playing stones. Mariner also passed down the following statement of Fīnau ʻUlukālala as he began to understand the value of these pieces to the European sailors:

If money were made of iron and could be converted into knives, axes and chisels there would be some sense in placing a value on it; but as it is, I see none. If a man has more yams than he wants, let him exchange some of them away for pork. [...] Certainly money is much handier and more convenient but then, as it will not spoil by being kept, people will store it up instead of sharing it out as a chief ought to do, and thus become selfish. [...] I understand now very well what it is that makes the papālangi [white men] so selfish – it is this money!

When Tonga introduced decimal currency, it decided not to call the main unit the dollar because the native word, tola, translated into a pig's snout, the soft end of a coconut, or, in vulgar language, a mouth. Paʻanga, on the other hand, translated into money.

== History ==
The paʻanga was introduced on 3 April 1967. It replaced the pound at a rate of 1 pound = 2 paʻanga. Until 11 February 1991, the paʻanga was pegged to the Australian dollar at par. Since that time, a basket of currencies is taken, and the paʻanga has continuously depreciated relative to the Australian dollar. Official exchange rates are released daily by the National Reserve Bank of Tonga.

== Coins ==
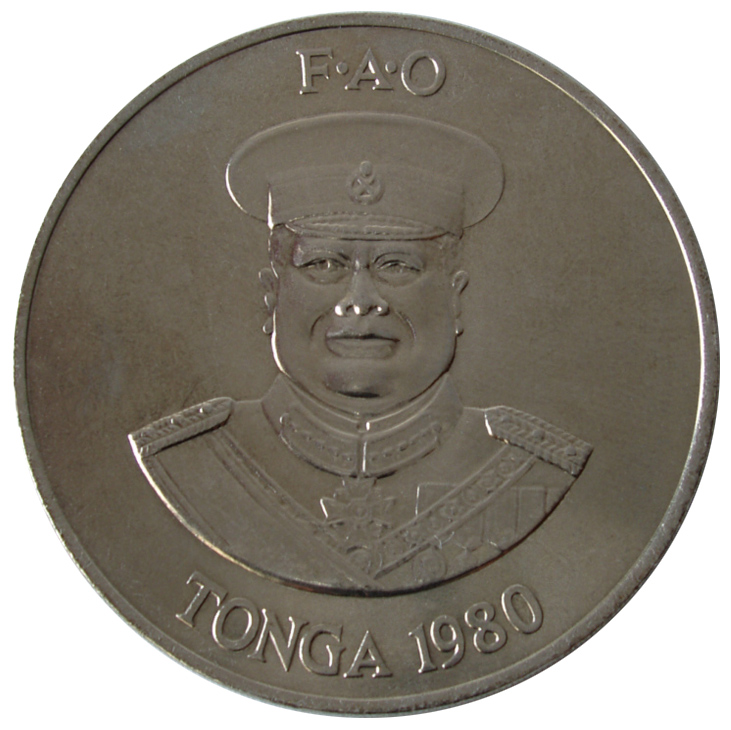
2 paʻanga coin depicting Tāufaʻāhau Tupou IV in military uniform.

In 1967, circulating coins were introduced in denominations of 1, 2, 5, 10, 20 and 50 seniti and 1 and 2 paʻanga. The 1 and 2 seniti were struck in bronze with the other denominations in cupro-nickel. The 50 seniti, 1, and 2 paʻanga were only struck in small numbers as these denominations were also issued in note form. In 1974, dodecagonal (twelve-sided) 50 seniti were introduced but 50 seniti banknotes continued to be issued until 1983. In 1974, 1 seniti coins were struck in brass rather than bronze but reverted to bronze in 1975.

In 1975, a new series of coins was issued, themed around FAO and food production and featuring a new portrait style effigy of the king. This was followed by another series of similar theme in 1981. 1 and 2 Paʻanga coins continued to be issued. Starting in 1978 the 1 Paʻanga coins were redesigned with an innovative, or at least unique rectangular shape while the 2 Paʻanga (depicted on the right) remained round and continued to be one of the world's largest circulating coins at the time (diameter 44.5 millimetres/1.75 inches), larger even than standard "English crown sized" coins. The reverses of both were changed annually to commemorate a different FAO goal or event. Later seven sided Christmas themed paʻanga coins also exist. However, due to the 2 Paʻanga coin's large size and weight and the awkward shape of the 1 paʻanga, they failed to compete against the 1 and 2 Paʻanga notes that were simultaneously issued so production of these denominations ended in the 1980s due to low commercial demand. All 1 and 2 paʻanga coins still remain legal tender but are rarely used.

in 2002, nickel-plated steel replaced cupro-nickel in the 10, 20, and 50 seniti and the 5 seniti in 2005. The change did not occur in the 5 seniti initially as there was still a reasonable quantity of coins in stock at the time of the change. The move was made to reduce costs in production of the coins. The weight of the coins was also slightly reduced, although they remained the same approximate size as earlier dated coins. In 2011, commercial demand for 20 and 50 seniti prompted these denominations to be issued featuring the effigy of Tupou IV posthumous, who had died in 2006. A new obverse design for George Tupou V had not yet been made or selected at this time, possibly due to increased health concerns regarding the latter monarch, who died in March 2012.

For a brief period, some of the higher denomination coinage from the 1967–1968 series was "countermarked" with commemoration stamps that were added to the coin after being struck. The most distinct of these is Oil Search series which was plated in gold or "gilt". Some countermarked pieces were released into circulation but many were also sold to collectors.

Current circulating coins are in denominations of 1, 2, 5, 10, 20 and 50 seniti. The one and two seniti coins are still valid but are becoming less common in circulation due to high production cost and low value and may only be readily available for months after a release by the banks. Total prices in shops are usually rounded to the nearest 5 or 10 seniti.

The first series of coins showed Queen Sālote Tupou III, two years after her death. The reverse designs were Tu'i Malila (a radiated tortoise presented to the Tongan royal family by James Cook in 1777) on the 1 and 2 seniti, wheat sheaves and a stylized depiction of the constellation Crux on the 5 and 10 seniti, and the Royal Tongan coat of arms on the higher denominations. From 1968, the portrait of King Tāufaʻāhau Tupou IV appeared, facing right, with the first year issue commemorating the coronation event. Since 1975, all coins have borne the word "Tonga" on the obverse and the inscription "Fakalahi meʻakai" ("Grow more food") and the denomination on the reverse. All 1975–2011 coins are FAO themed. The King is shown in military uniform in portrait format rather than profile.

In 2011, Tonga announced plans to reform its coinage and introduce a new and more modern series of coins shortly after neighboring Samoa and Fiji had done so, and on 3 March 2015 the Royal Australian Mint announced the production of new coins that would begin circulating later that year, featuring the portrait of King Tupou VI. Dignitaries, including Princess Lātūfuipeka Tukuʻaho, took turns striking the coins at a ceremony. "I'm very proud and honoured to be able to strike the coins today," she said. "This is also in celebration of His Majesty's coronation that is coming up in July."

Specifications and designs are:

Value	Diameter	Composition	1975–1979		1981	
Value	Diameter	Composition	Obverse	Reverse	Obverse	Reverse
1 seniti	18 mm	Bronze	Maize	Pig	Maize	Vanilla
2 seniti	21 mm	Bronze	Marrows	PLANNED FAMILIES FOOD FOR ALL, six people holding hands	Taro	PLANNED FAMILIES FOOD FOR ALL, six people holding hands
5 seniti	19 mm	Cupronickel	Chicken with chicks	Bananas	Chicken with chicks	Coconuts
10 seniti	24 mm	Cupronickel	King Tāufaʻāhau Tupou IV	Grazing cattle	King Tāufaʻāhau Tupou IV	Bananas on tree
20 seniti	29 mm	Cupronickel	King Tāufaʻāhau Tupou IV	Bees and hive	King Tāufaʻāhau Tupou IV	Yams
50 seniti	32–33 mm	Cupronickel	King Tāufaʻāhau Tupou IV	Fishes around a vortex	King Tāufaʻāhau Tupou IV	Tomatoes

Value	Diameter	Composition	2015	
Value	Diameter	Composition	Obverse	Reverse
5 seniti	17 mm	Nickel-plated steel	King Tupou VI	Heilala
10 seniti	19 mm	Nickel-plated steel	King Tupou VI	Malau
20 seniti	21 mm	Nickel-plated steel	King Tupou VI	Kalia
50 seniti	24 mm	Nickel-plated steel	King Tupou VI	Milolua
1 paʻanga	24 mm	Aluminium bronze	King George Tupou V	Coat of arms of Tonga

The King is shown facing on the 10, 20, and 50 seniti, under the initials FAO.

== Banknotes ==
In 1967, notes (bearing the portrait of Queen Sālote Tupou III) were introduced by the government in denominations of 1/2, 1, 2, 5 and 10 paʻanga. From 1974, the portrait of King Tāufaʻāhau Tupou IV appeared on the notes. 1/2 paʻanga notes were issued until 1983, with 20 paʻanga notes introduced in 1985, followed by 50 paʻanga in 1988. In 1992, the National Reserve Bank of Tonga took over production of paper money. On 30 July 2008, a new banknote series with greater security features was introduced featuring George Tupou V and a redesigned look. During this issue, a 100 paʻanga banknote was introduced for the first time.

The obverse of Tongan notes features text in the Tongan language and shows the portrait of the monarch. The reverse is in English language and shows typical motives and landmarks of Tonga: the Haʻamonga ʻa Maui Trilithon, a humpback whale, burial mounds, school students and rugby players, the royal palace, the Tongan Development Bank, the Port of Vavaʻu (twice, once depicted as it was around 1900, and the other in contemporary depiction), and ngatu making.

On 29 June 2015, the National Reserve Bank of Tonga introduced a new family of paʻanga banknotes in six denominations, from 2 to 100 paʻanga. Banknotes of 50 and 100 paʻanga are made of a paper/polymer hybrid substrate. They feature a portrait of the current king of Tonga, Tupou VI.

On 4 December 2023, the National Reserve Bank of Tonga introduced a new family of six banknotes to commemorate the birthday of George Tupou I.

Current TOP exchange rates
From Google Finance:	AUD CAD CHF CNY EUR GBP HKD JPY USD NZD JPY USD
From Yahoo! Finance:	AUD CAD CHF CNY EUR GBP HKD JPY USD NZD JPY USD
From XE.com:	AUD CAD CHF CNY EUR GBP HKD JPY USD NZD JPY USD
From OANDA:	AUD CAD CHF CNY EUR GBP HKD JPY USD NZD JPY USD

== See also ==
- Economy of Tonga
