= Tongatapu 6 =

Electoral constituency in Tonga

- Constituency for the Legislative Assembly of Tonga
- Region: Tongatapu

Current constituency
- Created: 2010
- Number of members: 1
- Party: Independent
- Member: Poasi Tei

Tongatapu 6 is an electoral constituency for the Legislative Assembly in the Kingdom of Tonga. It was established for the November 2010 general election, when the multi-seat regional constituencies for People's Representatives were replaced by single-seat constituencies, electing one representative via the first past the post electoral system. Located on the country's main island, Tongatapu, it encompasses the villages of Hofoa, Puke, Siaʻatoutai, Fatai, Lakepa, Matangiake, Kahoua, Makapaeo, Liahona, Lomaiviti, Houma, Haʻakame, Haʻalalo, and ʻUtulau.

Its first ever (and so far only) representative is Siosifa Tuʻitupou Tuʻutafaiva, of the Democratic Party of the Friendly Islands. Tuʻutafaiva, a high profile advocate lawyer and first time MP, won his seat by the narrowest margin for any of the People's Representatives' constituencies, with a majority of just four votes. This makes Tongatapu 6 a marginal seat. His main rival was Siosaia Moehau, President of the Tonga Tourism Association. After the election, Moehau requested a recount, which took place. The final count (given below) subtracted one vote from each of the two leading candidates, still providing Tuʻutafaiva with a four-vote majority. Poasi Tei won the seat for the DPFI in 2014, and has retained it ever since, though he stood as an independent at the 2021 election.

== Members of Parliament ==
| Election | Member | Party |
|---|---|---|
| 2010 | Siosifa Tuʻutafaiva | DPFI |
| 2014 | Poasi Tei | DPFI |
| 2017 | Poasi Tei | DPFI |
| 2021 | Poasi Tei | independent |

== Election results ==
=== 2010 ===
Tongan general election, 2010: Tongatapu 6
| Party | Candidate | Votes | % | ±% |
|---|---|---|---|---|
| Democrats | Siosifa Tuʻitupou Tuʻutafaiva | 734 | 26.5 | |
| (unknown) | Siosaia Moehau | 730 | 26.4 | |
| (unknown) | Posesi Fanua Bloomfield | 390 | 14.1 | |
| (unknown) | Sione Fifita Maumau | 279 | 10.1 | |
| (unknown) | Viliami Moimoi Vaea | 169 | 6.1 | |
| (unknown) | Siosiua Holitei Fonua | 163 | 5.9 | |
| (unknown) | Lesieli Huʻavailiku Niu | 61 | 2.2 | |
| (unknown) | Melino He Mapuʻatonga Tangi | 50 | 1.8 | |
| (unknown) | Sione Tuʻalau Vimahi | 47 | 1.7 | |
| (unknown) | Hemaloto Tatafu | 40 | 1.4 | |
| (unknown) | Sitiveni Finau | 30 | 1.1 | |
| (unknown) | Sepeti Vakameilalo | 24 | 0.9 | |
| (unknown) | Faleʻaisi Vaea Tangitau | 18 | 0.7 | |
| (unknown) | Latu Timote Tuʻiʻasoa | 17 | 0.6 | |
| PLT | ‘Ofakitokelau Fakalata | 16 | 0.6 | |
| Turnout | | 2773 | | |
| Majority | | 4 | 0.1 | n/a |
| Democrats win (new seat) | | | | |

== See also ==
- Constituencies of Tonga
