= Mateni Tapueluelu =

Tongan journalist, politician and Cabinet Minister

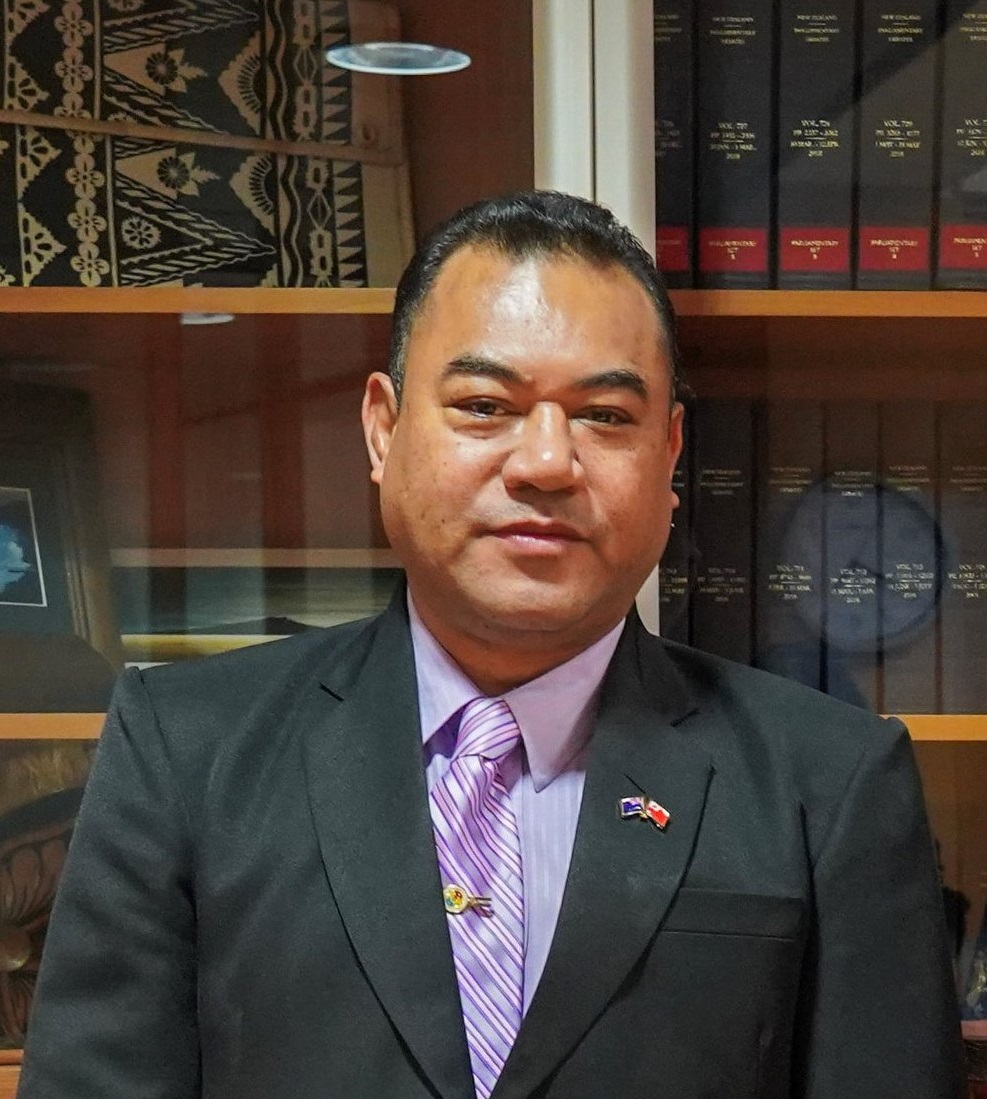
- Mateni Tapueluelu in 2019

Minister for Revenue and Customs
- Incumbent
- Assumed office 28 January 2025
- Prime Minister: ʻAisake Eke
- Preceded by: Tiofilusi Tiueti

Minister for Police, Fire & Emergency Services
- In office 6 March 2017 – 10 October 2019
- Prime Minister: ʻAkilisi Pōhiva
- Preceded by: Pohiva Tu'i'onetoa
- Succeeded by: Lord Nuku

Member of the Tongan Parliament for Tongatapu 4
- Incumbent
- Assumed office 3 November 2022
- Preceded by: Tatafu Moeaki
- In office 25 November 2014 – 18 November 2021
- Preceded by: ʻIsileli Pulu
- Succeeded by: Tatafu Moeaki
- Majority: 9.3%

Personal details
- Party: DPFI

Mateni Tapueluelu is a Tongan journalist, politician, and Cabinet Minister.

He has worked as a correspondent for Radio New Zealand International in Tonga, then became editor of the Keleʻa, the newspaper of the pro-democracy movement and of the Democratic Party of the Friendly Islands, led by his father-in-law ʻAkilisi Pohiva. Tapueluelu's wife Laucala, Pohiva's daughter, is the newspaper's publisher. In 2013, he was fined T$ 130,000 for having published in Keleʻa a letter to the editor found to have defamed members of the government. Tapueluelu and his wife published an editorial criticising the ruling, whereupon they were found to be in contempt of court, and subjected to an additional fine of T$2,700.

In the build-up to the 2014 general election, the Democratic Party suffered a split, de-selecting several of its own sitting members of the Legislative Assembly. Among those de-selected was Semisi Tapueluelu, MP for Tongatapu 10 and Mateni Tapueluelu's father. Under Mateni Tapueluelu's lead, Keleʻa published allegations of a sex scandal against his father. In the election in November, Semisi Tapueluelu lost his seat to the party's endorsed candidate in his constituency, while Mateni Tapueluelu was elected MP for Tongatapu 4. In so doing, he defeated incumbent MP and long-time key party figure ʻIsileli Pulu, who had also been de-selected and had therefore stood as an independent.

In December 2015 Tapueluelu's election was annulled by the Supreme Court on the grounds of unpaid fines owing from the 2013 criminal libel case. He successfully appealed against the ruling and was reinstated as an MP in April 2016. In March 2017 he was appointed Minister of Police in a reshuffle following ʻAisake Eke's resignation, replacing Pohiva Tu'i'onetoa. He was reappointed after the DPFI landslide in the 2017 election, but offered his resignation in March 2018 after a dispute with Armed Forces Minister Maʻafu Tukuiʻaulahi. His resignation was not accepted.

Following the death of ʻAkilisi Pōhiva he was not appointed to the cabinet of Pohiva Tuʻiʻonetoa.

He contested the 2021 Tongan general election, but was unsuccessful. He was re-elected again in the 2022 Tongatapu 4 by-election.

On 28 January 2025 he was appointed to the cabinet of ʻAisake Eke as Minister for Revenue and Customs.

He was re-elected at the 2025 election.
