= Vatau Hui =

Tongan politician

Minister for Internal Affairs
- In office 10 October 2019 – 28 December 2021
- Prime Minister: Pohiva Tuʻiʻonetoa
- Preceded by: Saia Piukala
- Succeeded by: Sione Sangster Saulala

Member of Parliament for Niua 17
- In office 16 November 2017 – 20 November 2025
- Preceded by: Fe‘aomoeata Vakata
- Succeeded by: Lataífaingataa Tangimana

Personal details
- Party: People's Party

Vatau Mefi Hui (born 1970) is a Tongan politician and former Cabinet Minister.

Hui worked in the education sector, as an assistant teacher at Niuatoutapu High School, then for the Ministry of Education and Tonga Institute of Education. He was first elected to the Legislative Assembly of Tonga as part of the Democratic Party of the Friendly Islands's landslide victory at the 2017 Tongan general election. In May 2018 he pleaded guilty to failing to submit a report of his electoral expenses and was fined US$129.

Following the death of ʻAkilisi Pōhiva Hui supported Pohiva Tuʻiʻonetoa for Prime Minister, leaving the DPFI to join Tuʻiʻonetoa's new People's Party. He was subsequently appointed to Tuʻiʻonetoa's Cabinet as Minister for Internal Affairs.

He was re-elected in the 2021 election, but not reappointed to Cabinet.

In February 2024 he was charged with indecent assault.

He lost his seat at the 2025 election.
