= Kaveinga Faʻanunu =

Tongan politician

Member of Parliament for Tongatapu 9
- In office 25 November 2010 – 24 July 2011
- Preceded by: none (constituency established)
- Succeeded by: Falisi Tupou
- Majority: 18.5%

Personal details
- Born: 30 July 1962
- Died: 24 July 2011 (aged 48) Nukuʻalofa
- Party: Democratic Party of the Friendly Islands

Kaveinga Faʻanunu (July 30, 1962 – July 24, 2011) was a Tongan politician

Having a Bachelor of Science degree in Forestry, he worked for nine years in various "forestry, agroforestry and managerial" positions in the government's forestry department, before going into politics. This included working for a time as chief executive officer of Tonga Timber, a government-owned company.

His brief career in national politics began when he was elected People's Representative for the ninth constituency of Tongatapu in the November 2010 general election. Standing as a candidate for the Democratic Party of the Friendly Islands, he obtained 34% of the vote, seeing off fourteen other candidates.

He died seven months later, on July 24, 2011, of "head and neck cancer", at Vaiola Hospital in Nukuʻalofa.
