= Sione Feingatau ʻIloa =

Tongan politician

Sione Feingatau Mafi ʻIloa is a Tongan politician and former member of the Legislative Assembly of Tonga. He represented the administrative division of Niuas.

ʻIloa worked as a school teacher. He was first elected to the Legislative Assembly in the 2008 election. Shortly before the 2010 elections he requested the Prime Minister grant MPs a bonus payment as "a blanket to keep themselves warm". He subsequently lost his seat.
