= Siaosi Pōhiva =

Tongan politician

Member of Parliament for Tongatapu 1
- In office 28 November 2019 – 18 November 2021
- Preceded by: ʻAkilisi Pōhiva
- Succeeded by: Tēvita Fatafehi Puloka

Personal details
- Party: Democratic Party of the Friendly Islands

Siaosi Vailahi Pōhiva is a Tongan politician and Member of the Legislative Assembly of Tonga. He is the eldest son of former Tongan Prime Minister ʻAkilisi Pōhiva and Neomai Tuitupou Of Kolomotua he is also a member of the Democratic Party of the Friendly Islands.

Pōhiva has previously worked for the Educational Quality and Assessment Program of the Pacific Community. He was elected to Parliament in a by-election following the death of his father in 2019.

In December 2019 Pōhiva was elected president of the Tonga Rugby Union.

He contested the 2021 Tongan general election, but was unsuccessful.
