= ʻAlipate Tupouniua =

Tongan politician (1915–1975)

Member of the Legislative Assembly
- Constituency: Tongatapu

Personal details
- Born: 1915 Nukuʻalofa, Tonga
- Died: 19 April 1975 (aged 59–60)

ʻAlipate Tupouniua (1915 – 19 April 1975) was a Tongan politician. He served as a member of the Legislative Assembly during the 1950s.

== Biography ==
Tupouniua was the son of Pauline Lisimoana and John William Cocker. He became a school inspector and a lay preacher for the Free Church of Tonga. He was elected to the Legislative Assembly in the 1950s from the Tongatapu People's Representatives constituency.

He also served on the Produce Board and Copra Boards until they were abolished in 1974. He died the following year, survived by nine children. His son Mahe served as Deputy Prime Minister and Minister of Finance.
