= Mahe Tupouniua =

Tongan politician

Mahe 'Uli'uli Tupouniua
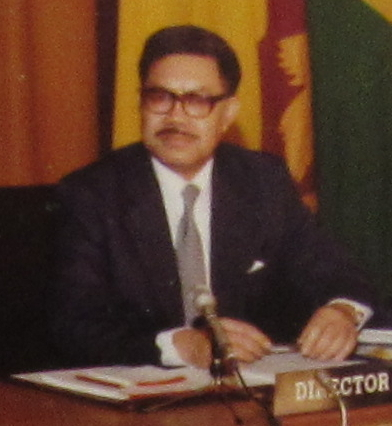

Minister of Finance
- In office 1961–1982
- Prime Minister: Tupoutoʻa Tungī; Fatafehi Tuʻipelehake
- Preceded by: George Goodacre
- Succeeded by: James Cecil Cocker

Personal details
- Born: 20 July 1927
- Died: 19 October 2007 (aged 80)
- Parent: ʻAlipate Tupouniua (father)
- Education: Auckland University

Mahe 'Uli'uli Tupouniua was a Tongan politician and former cabinet minister.

Tupouniua was born on 20 July 1927. He had a economics and anthropology degrees from Auckland University.

Tupouniua was Tonga's Minister of Finance from 1961 to 1982, when he was fired by King of Tonga. He was also Deputy Prime Minister of Tonga from 1965 to 1972.

Tupouniua was director of the Pacific Islands Forum Secretariat from November 1972 to 1980 and from January 1983 to January 1986.

He died on 19 October 2007. His son is the Tongan ambassador to United States.
