= Tatafu Moeaki =

Tongan politician (born 1972)

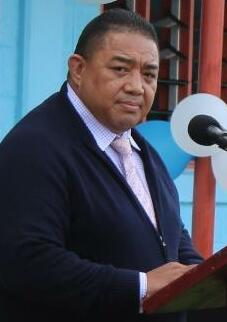
- Moeaki in 2016

Governor of National Reserve Bank of Tonga
- Incumbent
- Assumed office 20 December 2022
- Preceded by: Sione Ngongo Kioa

Minister of Finance
- In office 28 December 2021 – 10 August 2022
- Prime Minister: Siaosi Sovaleni
- Preceded by: Tevita Lavemaau
- Succeeded by: Tiofilusi Tiueti

Minister for Revenue and Customs
- In office 28 December 2021 – 10 August 2022
- Preceded by: Tevita Lavemaau
- Succeeded by: Tiofilusi Tiueti

Minister for Trade and Economic Development
- In office 25 January 2021 – 28 December 2021
- Prime Minister: Pohiva Tuʻiʻonetoa
- Preceded by: Samiu Vaipulu
- Succeeded by: Viliami Latu

Member of Parliament for Tongatapu 4
- In office 18 November 2021 – 10 August 2022
- Preceded by: Mateni Tapueluelu
- Succeeded by: Mateni Tapueluelu

Tatafu Toma Moeaki (born 1972) is a Tongan politician, former Cabinet Minister, and civil servant.

Moeaki joined the Tongan public service in 1995, working as head of Policy and Planning at the Ministry of Education and as Deputy Secretary for Foreign Affairs. In 2011 he worked as chief executive of the Ministry of Labour, Commerce and Industries. In 2013 he was appointed chief executive of the Ministry of Finance and National Planning. He resigned as chief executive in 2016 to take up a position for the Asian Development Bank.

On 25 January 2021 he was appointed to Prime Minister Pohiva Tuʻiʻonetoa's Cabinet as Minister for Trade and Economic Development in the cabinet reshuffle following the resignation of Sione Vuna Fa'otusia. After serving as a Minister he ran for the seat of Tongatapu 4 in the 2021 Tongan general election and was elected to the Legislative Assembly of Tonga. On 28 December 2021 he was appointed to the Cabinet of Siaosi Sovaleni as Minister of Finance and Minister of Revenue and Customs. On 6 May 2022 his election was voided after the Supreme Court found him guilty on two counts of bribery in an election petition. The conviction was stayed pending appeal on 26 May 2022. On 9 August 2022 his appeal was dismissed, and his election confirmed as void. He was formally unseated by Parliament on 10 August.

After being ousted from Parliament he was immediately hired as a project manager by the finance ministry. On 20 December 2022 he was appointed Governor of the National Reserve Bank of Tonga.
