= Times of Tonga =

Tongan newspaper and sister online publication

The Times of Tonga (Taimi o Tonga) was a biweekly newspaper in Tonga. First published in April 1989, it was published for 30 years by editor and publisher Kalafi Moala and was a frequent target of the Tongan government. Moala sold the business in 2019, and it is now an online publication.

The Taimi 'o Tonga was a frequent target of the Tongan government. In 1996, Moala and editor Filokalafi Akau’ola were imprisoned for 30 days for contempt of parliament after reporting on a motion in the Legislative Assembly which criticised a government minister. Their imprisonment was declared unconstitutional by the Supreme Court, and they were later awarded US$26,000 in compensation. In 2002, Moala published a history of the newspaper, Island Kingdom strikes Back: The Story of an Independent Island Newspaper.

In 2002, editor Mateni Tapueluelu was charged with sedition and forgery over the publication of a letter claiming king Taufa'ahau Tupou IV had a secret fortune.

In 2003, the newspaper was banned by the Tongan government for campaigning to overthrow the constitution. The ban was declared unconstitutional by the Supreme Court, but the government repeatedly ignored the ruling and reinstated the ban. The ban was eventually lifted in June 2003. The failure of the ban caused the government to amend the constitution to limit judicial review of royal decisions.

In 2004, the newspaper was banned under a new Media Operators Act, which prohibited foreign owned publications. The law was later overturned by the Supreme Court, and the Times was issued with a media licence.

In 2005, Tonga's crown prince Tupoutoʻa ʻUlukalala claimed that the newspaper's legal problems were due to a personal vendetta by then Police Minister Clive Edwards.

In March 2009, the Times purchased the government-owned Tonga Chronicle. In November 2009, the publication celebrated its 20th birthday.
