= 2022 in Tonga =

- Decades: 2000s; 2010s; 2020s
- See also: Other events of 2022; Timeline of Tongan history

Events in the year 2022 in Tonga.

== Incumbents ==
- Monarch: Tupou VI
- Prime Minister: Siaosi Sovaleni

== Events ==
Ongoing — COVID-19 pandemic in Tonga

- 14 January – 2022 Hunga Tonga eruption and tsunami: The Hunga Tonga, an undersea volcano, erupts, sending ash and steam 20 kilometers into the air. The government of Tonga issues a tsunami warning and advises people in all islands of Tonga to avoid the coasts.
- 15 January – King Tupou VI is evacuated from the Royal Palace by His Majesty's Armed Forces as ashfall from the Hunga Tonga eruption destroys homes and causes the evacuation of citizens to higher ground.
- 16 January – Satellite imagery of Hunga Tonga shows that most of the volcanic island was destroyed by the eruption.
- 2 February – Tonga enters a nationwide lockdown after the country reported its first locally transmitted COVID-19 cases.

== Deaths ==
- 10 June – Viliami Hingano, 47, politician, MP (2014–2017, since 2021), governor of Haʻapai (2021)
- 7 September – Willie Losʻe, 55, rugby union player (Auckland, North Harbour, Tonga national team) and broadcaster.
- 27 October – Semisi Fakahau, 74, politician, MP (since 2014).
