= 2023 in Tonga =

- Decades: 2000s; 2010s; 2020s
- See also: Other events of 2023; Timeline of Tongan history

Events in the year 2023 in Tonga.

== Incumbents ==
- Monarch: Tupou VI
- Prime Minister: Siaosi Sovaleni

== Events ==
Ongoing — COVID-19 pandemic in Tonga

- 19 January – 2023 Tongatapu 8 by-election: The election was won by Johnny Taione.
- 2023 Super Rugby Pacific season
