= ʻEtuate Lavulavu =

Tongan politician

‘Etuate Lavulavu

Minister of Infrastructure and Works
- In office 30 December 2014 – 29 January 2016
- Prime Minister: ʻAkilisi Pōhiva
- Preceded by: Samiu Vaipulu
- Succeeded by: Semisi Sika

Member of Parliament for Vavaʻu 16
- In office 27 November 2014 – 29 January 2016
- Preceded by: Viliami Latu
- Succeeded by: ʻAkosita Lavulavu

ʻEtuate Lavulavu (born 1958 or 1959) is a Tongan politician and former member of the Legislative Assembly of Tonga for Vavaʻu. He was stripped of his seat in 2016 after being convicted of bribery, precipitating the 2016 Vavaʻu 16 by-election. He graduated with a Bachelor of Arts from Brigham Young University–Hawaii followed by a Master of Arts from Brigham Young University in Utah. He publicly claimed to have a PhD from the University of Edenvale, a US diploma mill, and began referring to himself as "Professor".

He was first elected to the Legislative Assembly in the 2002 election. During his first term he was arrested in Utah, USA in October 2003 over a 1997 immigration scam. In 2004 he was convicted after pleading guilty to two counts of illegal use of a birth certificate. In 2003 Lavulavu apologised to the House after an altercation with fellow MP ʻAkilisi Pohiva. In 2004 he was suspended from Parliament for three days for disrupting the proceedings of the House. He lost his seat in the 2005 Tongan general election, but was re-elected in the 2008 election.

In the November 2010 general election, standing in newly districted single-seat constituency of Vavaʻu 14, he lost his seat to Lisiate ʻAkolo, obtaining 540 votes (22.7%) to ʻAkolo's 665 (28%).

Lavulavu was re-elected in the 2014 Tongan general election, but on 29 January 2016 Lavulavu was convicted of bribery by Tonga's Supreme Court for building roads as part of his election campaign and providing inducements to voters. He was also found to have violated election spending limits, and his election was declared void. His wife, ʻAkosita Lavulavu, won the resulting by-election.

On 3 March 2018 Lavulavu and his wife ʻAkosita Lavulavu were both arrested on fraud charges stemming from their management of the ʻUnuaki ʻo Tonga Royal Institute in 2016. On 4 June 2021 they were both convicted of 3 counts of obtaining money by false pretenses. On 2 July 2021, he and his wife were each sentenced to six years in prison by the Supreme Court. On 11 October 2022 the convictions were quashed by the Court of Appeal, and the case sent back to the Supreme Court for retrial.
