= 2024 in Tonga =

- Decades: 2000s; 2010s; 2020s
- See also: Other events of 2024; Timeline of Tongan history

Events in the year 2024 in Tonga.

== Incumbents ==
- Monarch: Tupou VI
- Prime Minister: Siaosi Sovaleni (until 9 December); Samiu Vaipulu (acting, from 9 December)

== Events ==
=== February ===
- 2 February – King Tupou VI withdraws confidence from Prime Minister Siaosi Sovaleni, removing his Armed Forces portfolio, and dismisses foreign minister Fekitamoeloa ʻUtoikamanu.
- The Legislative Assembly resumes live online streaming of its proceedings after suspending live radio broadcasts in August 2023.

=== September ===
- Welsh jurist Malcolm Bishop is appointed Tonga’s chief justice and president of the Land Court; a petition is filed for his removal over his sexuality but he remains in office.

=== October ===
- 1 October – A magnitude 6.6 earthquake strikes off Neiafu; a minimal landslide is caused with liquefaction hazards.
- Two prison officers are suspended for accepting bribes and facilitating drug trafficking into the prison system.

=== December ===
- 9 December – Prime Minister Siaosi Sovaleni resigns on the eve of a no-confidence vote against him in the Legislative Assembly of Tonga.
- 18 December – Eruptive activity begins at Home Reef with thermal anomalies, visible white and gray emissions, and lava covering approximately 75,000 m².
- 24 December – ʻAisake Eke is elected prime minister by the Legislative Assembly of Tonga in a 16-8 vote, defeating trade minister Viliami Latu.

== Holidays ==
- 1 January – New Year's Day
- 29 March – Good Friday
- 1 April – Easter Monday
- 25 April – Anzac Day
- 4 June – Emancipation Day
- 4 July – King Tupou IV's day
- 17 September – Crown Prince's Birthday
- 4 November – National Day
- 4 December – King Tupou I Day
- 25 December – Christmas Day
- 26 December – Boxing Day

== Deaths ==
- 18 November – ʻAna Taufeʻulungaki, 78, politician.
