= 2024 Vavaʻu 14 by-election =

A by-election was held in the Tongan electorate of Vavaʻu 14 on 28 March 2024. The by-election was triggered by the resignation of MP Saia Piukala on 12 January 2024. The election was won by Mo’ale ‘Otunuku.

Four candidates contested the by-election: Viliami Tinitali Piukala, Sione Fataua Halatanu, Mo’ale ‘Otunuku, and Matini Fatanitavake Ma’afu 'o Veikune Tu’itonga Veikune.

== Results ==
Candidate	Votes	%
Mo’ale ‘Otunuku	709	41.95
Sione Fataua Halatanu	353	20.89
Viliami Tinitali Piukala	316	18.70
Matini Fatanitavake Ma’afu 'o Veikune Tu’itonga Veikune	312	18.46
Total	1,690	100.00
