= Lavulavu =

Lavulavu is a surname. Notable people with the surname include:

- ʻAkosita Lavulavu (born 1985), Tongan politician
- ʻEtuate Lavulavu (born 1958 or 1959), Tongan politician
