= 2014 Tongan general election =

- 27 November 2014
- All 26 elected seats in the Legislative Assembly; 14 seats needed for a majority
- Turnout: 79.16% (▼11.68pp)
| Party | Leader | Vote % | Seats | +/– |
|---|---|---|---|---|
| Democrats | ʻAkilisi Pōhiva | 33.34 | 9 | −3 |
| Independents | – | 66.66 | 8 | +3 |
This lists parties that won seats. See the complete results below.
Results by constituency
| Prime Minister before | Prime Minister after |
|---|---|
| Sialeʻataongo Tuʻivakanō; Independent | ʻAkilisi Pōhiva; Democrats |

General elections were held in Tonga on 27 November 2014. Sialeʻataongo Tuʻivakanō, a noble member of parliament, had served as prime minister since 2010, assuming the role after the country's first post-democratisation election. The Democratic Party of the Friendly Islands (PTOA), led by veteran politician ʻAkilisi Pōhiva, missed out on forming a government after the 2010 election and became the de facto opposition. The PTOA unsuccessfully attempted to pass additional government reforms thereafter.

The PTOA largely campaigned on increasing government transparency and strengthening the rule of law. The 2014 election saw extensive involvement from the Tongan diaspora, even though voting was restricted to eligible voters present in Tonga on election day. The PTOA went on to win nine seats, a decrease from 12 in 2010, while independent candidates won eight. Around half of the people's representatives, and one of the nine noble members, lost their seats. Despite a record 16 women having contested the election, no female candidates secured a seat. Following the election, parliament elected a prime minister on 29 December. Two candidates were nominated, the PTOA's Pōhiva and Deputy Prime Minister Samiu Vaipulu, an independent. Pōhiva went on to defeat Vaipulu, after securing the support of some independents, and became the first commoner to be elected as Tonga's prime minister. Pōhiva was sworn in on 30 December and unveiled his cabinet the following day.

== Background ==
The previous election, held in 2010, was the first held after the implementation of democratic reforms that year. The reforms saw the then-monarch, King George Tupou V, relinquish much of his executive powers. The number of people's seats was also increased from nine to 17, allowing the formation of governments that would predominantly comprise popularly elected members. The PTOA, which was formed shortly before the election by veteran pro-democracy politician ‘Akilisi Pōhiva, secured 12 of the people's seats, while independents won the other five. Following the election, the PTOA nominated Pōhiva for prime minister, despite Deputy Leader Sitiveni Halapua having been the party's presumptive nominee during the campaign. Two of the independent people's representatives nominated noble MP Sialeʻataongo Tuʻivakanō to challenge Pōhiva. Tuʻivakanō went on to defeat Pōhiva in the parliamentary vote, receiving 14 votes to his opponent's 12. Pōhiva's confrontational style and the PTOA's attempts to introduce a bi-polarity system in parliament, with a governing caucus and opposition, reportedly alienated many of the nobles' representatives. Tuʻivakanō appointed two PTOA members to the cabinet; Pōhiva was offered the health portfolio but ultimately declined. He expressed disappointment that Tuʻivakanō did not appoint more PTOA MPs to cabinet. One of the PTOA cabinet ministers, Sione Sangster Saulala, was expelled from the party shortly after taking office, while the other, Siosifa Tuʻitupou Tuʻutafaiva, subsequently left the PTOA. The party subsequently became the de facto opposition in parliament.

In October 2012, Prime Minister Tuʻivakanō survived a no-confidence motion that was filed by the PTOA. Pōhiva accused the government of misappropriating funds, which he said was in violated the constitution. The motion was rejected with 11 MPs in support, while 13 voted to keep Tu‘ivakanō in office.

During the parliamentary term, the PTOA attempted to pass further electoral reforms. In 2013, PTOA MP ʻAisake Eke introduced a bill that would have allowed the public to directly vote for the prime minister, instead of the members of the Legislative Assembly. The legislature rejected the bill in late October, with only six MPs voting in favour and 15 against. Some PTOA MPs also opposed the proposal. A week later, Pōhiva announced that his party would submit another reform proposal in the first parliamentary session of 2014 that would see voting for the nobles' representatives be extended to the rest of the country's electorate, rather than being restricted to the nobility. Pōhiva argued that the proposal would bring more public accountability to parliament. Academic Malakai Koloamatangi stated that while the proposal had some public support, he believed it was too late in the parliamentary term for the bill to have any effect on the 2014 election, even if it were to pass. Koloamatangi further noted that the PTOA would have had to introduce the bill at least by mid-term for it to take effect in time for the election.

== Electoral system ==
The Legislative Assembly of Tonga has up to 30 members, of which 17 are directly elected by first-past-the-post voting from single-member constituencies. The island of Tongatapu has ten constituencies, Vavaʻu three, Haʻapai two and ʻEua and the Niuas have one each. Nine seats are held by members of the nobility who elect representatives amongst themselves. The cabinet, formed by a prime minister, may include up to four members not elected to the Assembly, who then automatically become members of the legislature. Unless the monarch dissolves the Legislative Assembly early, members serve a four-year term.

Candidates and voters are required to be at least 21 years old and hold Tongan citizenship. Ineligible voters include those who have served a prison sentence of at least two years and individuals convicted of a criminal offence. To qualify, candidates are required to be eligible voters and present in Tonga for at least a three-month period within the six months before an election. Candidates running for a people's seat also require the signatures of at least 50 qualified electors from the constituency they contest and a deposit to be paid. Individuals subject to legal action for outstanding debt are ineligible to be contestants. Contestants for the people's seats were also required to undergo a legal clearance to qualify. The nobles, however, were exempt from this procedure. A total of 51,448 individuals were registered to vote in this election.

== Candidates and campaign ==
A total of 105 candidates contested the people's seats, a decrease from the 144 in 2010. A record 16 female contestants ran in the election, a seventeenth woman candidate withdrew from the race due to large unpaid debts to the courts. Two other Tongatapu candidates were disqualified, including one who was not residing in the constituency he was to contest. The PTOA fielded 17 candidates. Before the election, Pōhiva's newspaper, Keleʻa, proposed to swap out some of the PTOA's sitting MPs on Tongatapu running for re-election. The party's then-deputy leader, ʻIsileli Pulu, warned that such a move could potentially undermine the PTOA's chances of forming a government, especially if the booted members were re-elected as independents. Following backlash from some of the party's MPs, Pōhiva abandoned the plan. Pulu, however, was disappointed that the final candidate list had not been determined collectively, and, along with another senior member, defected to run as an independent. Despite the defections, Pōhiva expressed confidence in the party's chances in the election.

The PTOA campaigned on strengthening the rule of law, which Pōhiva said would be enabled by increasing accountability and transparency in government. He also continued to advocate for the elections of the nobles' representatives to be extended to all eligible voters, arguing that such a measure would be a crucial step to ensure government is held accountable by the public. Pōhiva clarified that the PTOA supported retaining the monarchy, but believed the democratic reforms had been inefficient up until that point, which he attributed to the nobles' domination in the sitting government. Many candidates also campaigned in Auckland, New Zealand. Despite Tongans abroad not being able to vote overseas, the diaspora's increasing engagement with Tonga's domestic affairs and influence over voters in the country through social media had led many candidates to view them as crucial. Many Tongans in New Zealand reportedly supported Pōhiva and his party.

== Conduct ==
The parliamentary term formally concluded on 11 September, while voter registration closed on 16 September. King Tupou VI issued the election writ on 30 September. Unlike in 2010, there little to no international delegations observing present in Tonga to observe the election. A campaign blackout commenced on the morning of 26 November, 24-hours before voting commenced. On election day, voting for the people's seats began at 9:00 and concluded at 16:00. Voting for the nobles' representatives was held from 10:00 to 12:00. The election was reportedly peaceful with few irregularities. The electoral commission received complaints after the election against two successful candidates in Vavaʻu, claiming they violated campaign regulations.

== Results ==
The PTOA won nine of the people's seats, while independents won the other eight. Despite securing one less seat than the PTOA, independents received a combined majority of the popular vote, with around 66%. Of the incumbent people's representatives that contested the election, 12 of whom, approximately half, lost their seats, including seven of the ten Tongatapu MPs. One noble MP also lost re-election. Although the election saw record female participation, no women won any seats. PTOA MP Moʻale Finau initially secured re-election in the Haʻapai 12 constituency by a narrow margin. A subsequent recount, however, awarded the seat to Finau's main opponent, independent Viliami Hingano.

| Party | Votes | % | Seats | +/– |
|---|---|---|---|---|
| Democratic Party of the Friendly Islands | 13,548 | 33.34 | 9 | –3 |
| Independents | 27,084 | 66.66 | 8 | +3 |
| Nobles' representatives | | | 9 | 0 |
| Total | 40,632 | 100.00 | 26 | 0 |
| Valid votes | 40,632 | 99.77 | | |
| Invalid/blank votes | 95 | 0.23 | | |
| Total votes | 40,727 | 100.00 | | |
| Registered voters/turnout | 51,448 | 79.16 | | |
Source: TEC, Psephos, IFES

=== By constituency ===
Tongatapu 1
| Candidate | Party | Votes | % |
|---|---|---|---|
| ʻAkilisi Pōhiva | Democratic Party of the Friendly Islands | 1,482 | 53.77 |
| William Cocker | Independent | 448 | 16.26 |
| Mosese Teu-Ki-Veiuto Manuofetoa | Independent | 345 | 12.52 |
| Ilisapesi Tauʻakitangata Seli Baker | Independent | 191 | 6.93 |
| Ana Kanume Bing Fonua | Independent | 132 | 4.79 |
| Emeline ʻUheina Tuita | Independent | 75 | 2.72 |
| Eliesa Fifita | Independent | 75 | 2.72 |
| Soloni Lutui | Independent | 8 | 0.29 |
| Total | | 2,756 | 100.00 |
| Valid votes | | 2,756 | 99.53 |
| Invalid/blank votes | | 13 | 0.47 |
| Total votes | | 2,769 | 100.00 |
Source: TEC

Tongatapu 2
| Candidate | Party | Votes | % |
|---|---|---|---|
| Sēmisi Sika | Democratic Party of the Friendly Islands | 1,091 | 48.36 |
| Sione Tuʻitavake Fonua | Independent | 543 | 24.07 |
| Tevita Kaituʻu Fotu | Independent | 436 | 19.33 |
| Soane Patita Vakautafefine Fifita | Independent | 186 | 8.24 |
| Total | | 2,256 | 100.00 |
| Valid votes | | 2,256 | 99.60 |
| Invalid/blank votes | | 9 | 0.40 |
| Total votes | | 2,265 | 100.00 |
Source: TEC

Tongatapu 3
| Candidate | Party | Votes | % |
|---|---|---|---|
| Siaosi Sovaleni | Independent | 999 | 33.72 |
| Tevita Palu | Independent | 711 | 24.00 |
| Clive Edwards | Independent | 518 | 17.48 |
| Mesuilame Simote Vea | Democratic Party of the Friendly Islands | 459 | 15.49 |
| Mele Teusivi ʻAmanaki | Independent | 151 | 5.10 |
| Gabriella ʻIlolahia | Independent | 110 | 3.71 |
| Paula Lavulo | Independent | 15 | 0.51 |
| Total | | 2,963 | 100.00 |
| Valid votes | | 2,963 | 99.80 |
| Invalid/blank votes | | 6 | 0.20 |
| Total votes | | 2,969 | 100.00 |
Source: TEC

Tongatapu 4
| Candidate | Party | Votes | % |
|---|---|---|---|
| Mateni Tapueluelu | Democratic Party of the Friendly Islands | 783 | 31.96 |
| ʻIsileli Pulu | Independent | 570 | 23.27 |
| Etika Koka | Independent | 492 | 20.08 |
| Seketi Foʻou Fuko | Independent | 248 | 10.12 |
| Etuate ʻEniti Sakalia | Independent | 168 | 6.86 |
| Poli Tuaileva | Independent | 94 | 3.84 |
| Tevita ʻIta Koloamatangi | Independent | 54 | 2.20 |
| Felise ʻUlupano | Independent | 37 | 1.51 |
| Tominiko Folaumotuita Kama | Independent | 4 | 0.16 |
| Total | | 2,450 | 100.00 |
| Valid votes | | 2,450 | 99.51 |
| Invalid/blank votes | | 12 | 0.49 |
| Total votes | | 2,462 | 100.00 |
Source: TEC

Tongatapu 5
| Candidate | Party | Votes | % |
|---|---|---|---|
| ʻAisake Eke | Democratic Party of the Friendly Islands | 1,682 | 58.24 |
| Maliu Takai | Independent | 1,090 | 37.74 |
| Lia Manatu Faoa | Independent | 72 | 2.49 |
| Viliami Mangisi | Independent | 44 | 1.52 |
| Total | | 2,888 | 100.00 |
| Valid votes | | 2,888 | 99.65 |
| Invalid/blank votes | | 10 | 0.35 |
| Total votes | | 2,898 | 100.00 |
Source: TEC

Tongatapu 6
| Candidate | Party | Votes | % |
|---|---|---|---|
| Poasi Tei | Independent | 1,036 | 35.70 |
| Salesi Finau Huʻia Fotu | Democratic Party of the Friendly Islands | 912 | 31.43 |
| Siosifa Tuʻitupou Tuʻutafaiva | Independent | 629 | 21.67 |
| Sione Tatafu Angakehe Tafuna | Independent | 325 | 11.20 |
| Total | | 2,902 | 100.00 |
| Valid votes | | 2,902 | 99.76 |
| Invalid/blank votes | | 7 | 0.24 |
| Total votes | | 2,909 | 100.00 |
Source: TEC

Tongatapu 7
| Candidate | Party | Votes | % |
|---|---|---|---|
| Sione Vuna Faʻotusia | Independent | 822 | 30.75 |
| Sione Sangster Saulala | Independent | 762 | 28.51 |
| Sipola Fakaʻanga Havili Halafihi | Democratic Party of the Friendly Islands | 686 | 25.66 |
| Mavaetangi Manavahetau | Independent | 199 | 7.44 |
| Atalasa Misilemoti Pouvalu | Independent | 99 | 3.70 |
| Pinomi Prescott | Independent | 41 | 1.53 |
| Amanaki Paea Molitika | Independent | 33 | 1.23 |
| Siosifa Filini Sikuea | Independent | 31 | 1.16 |
| Total | | 2,673 | 100.00 |
| Valid votes | | 2,673 | 99.81 |
| Invalid/blank votes | | 5 | 0.19 |
| Total votes | | 2,678 | 100.00 |
Source: TEC

Tongatapu 8
| Candidate | Party | Votes | % |
|---|---|---|---|
| Semisi Fakahau | Democratic Party of the Friendly Islands | 1,016 | 38.81 |
| Tevita Tuʻi Uata | Independent | 895 | 34.19 |
| Sione Taione | Independent | 663 | 25.32 |
| Mafileʻo Mataele | Independent | 32 | 1.22 |
| Sipaisi Kutu | Independent | 12 | 0.46 |
| Total | | 2,618 | 100.00 |
| Valid votes | | 2,618 | 99.89 |
| Invalid/blank votes | | 3 | 0.11 |
| Total votes | | 2,621 | 100.00 |
Source: TEC

Tongatapu 9
| Candidate | Party | Votes | % |
|---|---|---|---|
| Penisimani Fifita | Democratic Party of the Friendly Islands | 692 | 25.86 |
| Vika Fusimalohi | Independent | 618 | 23.09 |
| Falisi Tupou | Independent | 571 | 21.34 |
| Tevita Tupu ʻOfa | Independent | 506 | 18.91 |
| Samipeni Uaine Finau | Independent | 199 | 7.44 |
| Lemasingo Tania Nai | Independent | 90 | 3.36 |
| Total | | 2,676 | 100.00 |
| Valid votes | | 2,676 | 99.74 |
| Invalid/blank votes | | 7 | 0.26 |
| Total votes | | 2,683 | 100.00 |
Source: TEC

Tongatapu 10
| Candidate | Party | Votes | % |
|---|---|---|---|
| Pōhiva Tuʻiʻonetoa | Democratic Party of the Friendly Islands | 1,402 | 46.29 |
| Fakaʻosilea Kaufusi | Independent | 845 | 27.90 |
| Daniel Kimball Fale | Independent | 452 | 14.92 |
| Semisi Tapueluelu | Independent | 285 | 9.41 |
| Seini Teu | Independent | 45 | 1.49 |
| Total | | 3,029 | 100.00 |
| Valid votes | | 3,029 | 99.80 |
| Invalid/blank votes | | 6 | 0.20 |
| Total votes | | 3,035 | 100.00 |
Source: TEC

ʻEua 11
| Candidate | Party | Votes | % |
|---|---|---|---|
| Tevita Lavemaau | Democratic Party of the Friendly Islands | 760 | 35.22 |
| Sunia Fili | Independent | 716 | 33.18 |
| Taniela Fusimalohi | Independent | 618 | 28.64 |
| Suliasi Pouvalu Fonise 'Aholelei | Independent | 57 | 2.64 |
| Silivia Loumaile Mahe | Independent | 7 | 0.32 |
| Total | | 2,158 | 100.00 |
| Valid votes | | 2,158 | 99.95 |
| Invalid/blank votes | | 1 | 0.05 |
| Total votes | | 2,159 | 100.00 |
Source: TEC

Haʻapai 12
| Candidate | Party | Votes | % |
|---|---|---|---|
| Viliami Hingano | Independent | 535 | 31.32 |
| Moʻale Finau | Democratic Party of the Friendly Islands | 532 | 31.15 |
| Pita Faiva Taufatofua | Independent | 396 | 23.19 |
| Pita Vi | Independent | 158 | 9.25 |
| Tuʻivaita Ueleni | Independent | 69 | 4.04 |
| Latiume Kaufusi | Independent | 18 | 1.05 |
| Total | | 1,708 | 100.00 |
| Valid votes | | 1,708 | 99.94 |
| Invalid/blank votes | | 1 | 0.06 |
| Total votes | | 1,709 | 100.00 |
Source: TEC

Haʻapai 13
| Candidate | Party | Votes | % |
|---|---|---|---|
| Veivosa Taka | Democratic Party of the Friendly Islands | 823 | 49.46 |
| Samiuela Takapuna Fangaloka | Independent | 443 | 26.62 |
| Sosaia Langitoto Helu | Independent | 156 | 9.38 |
| Anau Ki Lifuka ʻAnau | Independent | 139 | 8.35 |
| Sione Talanoa Fifita | Independent | 103 | 6.19 |
| Total | | 1,664 | 100.00 |
| Valid votes | | 1,664 | 99.94 |
| Invalid/blank votes | | 1 | 0.06 |
| Total votes | | 1,665 | 100.00 |
Source: TEC

Vavaʻu 14
| Candidate | Party | Votes | % |
|---|---|---|---|
| Saia Piukala | Independent | 1,232 | 50.43 |
| Lisiate ʻAkolo | Independent | 739 | 30.25 |
| Latu Niua Lepolo | Democratic Party of the Friendly Islands | 272 | 11.13 |
| Matini Veikune | Independent | 79 | 3.23 |
| Tuʻamelie Faituʻa Kemoeʻatu | Independent | 70 | 2.87 |
| Tongovua Toloke Appleton | Independent | 34 | 1.39 |
| Taniela Fakalolo Kivalu | Independent | 17 | 0.70 |
| Total | | 2,443 | 100.00 |
| Valid votes | | 2,443 | 99.84 |
| Invalid/blank votes | | 4 | 0.16 |
| Total votes | | 2,447 | 100.00 |
Source: TEC

Vavaʻu 15
| Candidate | Party | Votes | % |
|---|---|---|---|
| Samiu Vaipulu | Independent | 747 | 33.65 |
| Tomifa Paea | Independent | 524 | 23.60 |
| Kulufeinga ʻAnisi Bloomfield | Democratic Party of the Friendly Islands | 472 | 21.26 |
| Keuli Pasina Lavaki | Independent | 166 | 7.48 |
| Sione Sosefo Fitu Mailangi | Independent | 95 | 4.28 |
| Alekisio Kaitaʻeifo | Independent | 77 | 3.47 |
| Alwyn Thomas Moa | Independent | 36 | 1.62 |
| Elieta Sapate Toke | Independent | 31 | 1.40 |
| Salesi Kauvaka | Independent | 27 | 1.22 |
| Viliami Kaufusi Helu | Independent | 20 | 0.90 |
| Viliami Pasikala | Independent | 16 | 0.72 |
| Henele Tuʻulau Fononga | Independent | 9 | 0.41 |
| Total | | 2,220 | 100.00 |
| Valid votes | | 2,220 | 99.82 |
| Invalid/blank votes | | 4 | 0.18 |
| Total votes | | 2,224 | 100.00 |
Source: TEC

Vavaʻu 16
| Candidate | Party | Votes | % |
|---|---|---|---|
| ‘Etuate Lavulavu | Independent | 767 | 33.64 |
| Viliami Latu | Independent | 627 | 27.50 |
| Ipeni ʻAlamoni Siale | Democratic Party of the Friendly Islands | 346 | 15.18 |
| Tupoulahi Manuofetoa | Independent | 212 | 9.30 |
| Aisea Silivenusi | Independent | 135 | 5.92 |
| Viliami Lolohea | Independent | 106 | 4.65 |
| Ikani Loneli Taliai | Independent | 87 | 3.82 |
| Total | | 2,280 | 100.00 |
| Valid votes | | 2,280 | 99.78 |
| Invalid/blank votes | | 5 | 0.22 |
| Total votes | | 2,285 | 100.00 |
Source: TEC

Ongo Niua 17
| Candidate | Party | Votes | % |
|---|---|---|---|
| Sosefo Feʻaomoeata Vakata | Independent | 519 | 54.75 |
| Vatau Hui | Independent | 291 | 30.70 |
| Sione Peauafi Haukinima | Democratic Party of the Friendly Islands | 138 | 14.56 |
| Total | | 948 | 100.00 |
| Valid votes | | 948 | 99.89 |
| Invalid/blank votes | | 1 | 0.11 |
| Total votes | | 949 | 100.00 |
Source: TEC

=== Nobles ===
| Constituency | Elected candidate | Votes |
|---|---|---|
| ʻEua | Lord Nuku | 7 |
| Haʻapai | Lord Tuʻihaʻateiho | 4 |
| Haʻapai | Lord Tuʻihaʻangana | 4 |
| Niuas | Lord Fusituʻa | 2 |
| Tongatapu | Lord Vaea | 11 |
| Tongatapu | Lord Maʻafu | 10 |
| Tongatapu | Lord Tuʻivakanō | 8 |
| Vavaʻu | Lord Tuʻiʻafitu | 5 |
| Vavaʻu | Lord Tuʻilakepa | 4 |
Source: Tonga Portal

== Aftermath ==
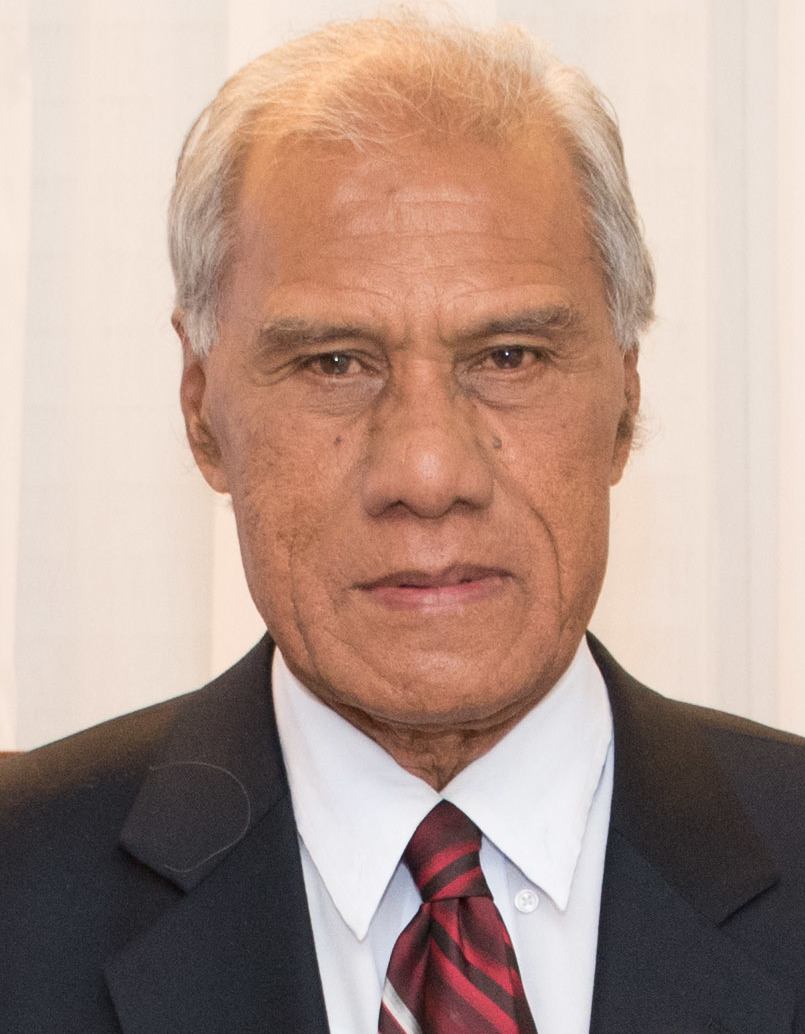
Veteran MP ʻAkilisi Pōhiva became the first commoner to be elected prime minister

Following the election, 14 of the people's representatives, who composed a majority of all MPs, met on 3 December and reached an agreement, determining that the next prime minister should be a people's member. Two candidates contested the parliamentary vote for prime minister. The independent people's representatives nominated Deputy Prime Minister Samiu Vaipulu, while the nobles' representatives initially nominated ʻAlipate Tuʻivanuavou Vaea. After negotiating with the independent people's MPs, however, on 15 December the nobles withdrew Vaea's nomination and backed Vaipulu. Pōhiva also ran in the prime ministerial election, supported by his PTOA party. Vaipulu emerged as the apparent favourite to win, reportedly having the support of a majority of MPs at one point; however, shortly before the 29 December vote, Pōhiva managed to win support from a bloc of independents led by Siaosi Sovaleni. Pōhiva went on to defeat Vaipulu, becoming the first commoner to be elected prime minister. He received 15 votes, while Vaipulu garnered the support of 11 MPs. Pōhiva subsequently called on the nobles to work with his government and assist in passing further government reforms. Pōhiva was sworn in on 30 December, and the monarch approved his cabinet selection the following day. Sovaleni became deputy prime minister, while Pōhiva retained two cabinet ministers from the previous government, including the lands and natural resources minister, Maʻafu Tukuiʻaulahi, who was also the only noble MP selected. Outgoing Prime Minister Tuʻivakanō was elected as the speaker of parliament. The monarch opened the Legislative Assembly on 15 January 2015.

Some unsuccessful candidates filed electoral petitions against their successful opponents after the election, alleging bribery and other electoral corruption on the part of their opponents. Two of the defendants were former Deputy Prime Minister Vaipulu and Education Minister ʻEtuate Lavulavu. The petition against Vaipulu, which alleged that he induced voters by offering them cigarettes and other goods, was withdrawn by the complainant in March 2015. The Supreme Court, on the other hand, convicted Lavulavu for bribery in January 2016, finding that he had financed the construction of roads during the campaign and offered money to voters on election day to win votes. The court also found he had spent beyond the legal limit and voided his election to the Vava‘u 16 seat. Lavulavu's wife, ʻAkosita Lavulavu, won the subsequent by-election in the constituency, which was held in July 2016. As a result, she became the first woman to be elected to the Legislative Assembly since democratisation.
