= 2005 Tongan general election =

| ← 2002 | 17 March 2005 | 2008 → |
- 18 of the 30 seats in the Legislative Assembly
| Party | Leader | Vote % | Seats |
|---|---|---|---|
| HRDM | ʻAkilisi Pōhiva | 44.95 | 7 |
| Independent | – | 55.05 | 2 |
This lists parties that won seats. See the complete results below.
| Prime Minister before | Prime Minister after |
|---|---|
| ʻUlukālala Lavaka Ata; Independent | ʻUlukālala Lavaka Ata; Independent |

General elections were held in Tonga on 17 March 2005. Only nine members of the 30-seat parliament were elected, with the remainder appointed by the King or belonging to the Tongan aristocracy. The Human Rights and Democracy Movement won seven of the nine seats. Prince ʻUlukālala Lavaka Ata, a son of the King, initially retained his position as Prime Minister, but resigned in 2006, with the position passing to Feleti Sevele, one of the two independent candidates elected. Sevele is the first non-noble Prime Minister of the country.

== Results ==
| Party | Votes | % | Seats |
|---|---|---|---|
| Human Rights and Democracy Movement | 35,200 | 44.95 | 7 |
| Independents | 43,117 | 55.05 | 2 |
| Nobles' representatives | | | 9 |
| Royal appointees | | | 12 |
| Total | 78,317 | 100.00 | 30 |
| Total votes | 33,119 | – | |
| Registered voters/turnout | 65,555 | 50.52 | |
Source: Psephos, IPU

=== By constituency ===
| Constituency | Candidate | Party | Votes | % | Notes |
|---|---|---|---|---|---|
| Eua | Sunia Fili | Human Rights and Democracy Movement | 1,314 | 52.5 | Elected |
| Eua | Sefesi Tupou Kanongataʻa Hausia | Independent | 804 | 32.1 | |
| Eua | Finau Sakea Fusituʻa | Independent | 269 | 10.8 | |
| Eua | Sione ʻOfa Vakaʻuta | Independent | 115 | 4.6 | |
| Haʻapai | ʻUliti Uata | Human Rights and Democracy Movement | 2,627 | 28.0 | Elected |
| Haʻapai | Fineasi Funaki | Human Rights and Democracy Movement | 2,072 | 22.1 | Elected |
| Haʻapai | ʻOsaiasi Latu | Independent | 1,959 | 20.9 | |
| Haʻapai | Moʻale Finau | Independent | 919 | 9.8 | |
| Haʻapai | Sione Talanoa Fifita | Independent | 858 | 9.2 | |
| Haʻapai | Sailosi Vea Fanua | Independent | 735 | 7.8 | |
| Haʻapai | Langilangi Vimahi | Independent | 198 | 2.1 | |
| Niuas | Sione Peauafi Haukinima | Human Rights and Democracy Movement | 709 | 69.9 | Elected |
| Niuas | ʻAisea Taʻofi | Independent | 204 | 20.1 | |
| Niuas | ʻOketi Lotulelei ʻAkauʻola | Independent | 60 | 5.9 | |
| Niuas | Paula Palelei | Independent | 42 | 4.1 | |
| Tongatapu | ʻAkilisi Pōhiva | Human Rights and Democracy Movement | 11,103 | 21.8 | Elected |
| Tongatapu | ʻIsileli Pulu | Human Rights and Democracy Movement | 8,008 | 15.7 | Elected |
| Tongatapu | Feleti Sevele | Human Rights and Democracy Movement | 7,499 | 14.7 | Elected |
| Tongatapu | Clive Edwards | Independent | 3,546 | 7.0 | |
| Tongatapu | Fuiva Ruby Adeline Kavaliku | Independent | 3,161 | 6.0 | |
| Tongatapu | Mateitalo F. Mahuʻinga | Independent | 2,937 | 5.8 | |
| Tongatapu | Lopeti Senituli | Independent | 2,819 | 5.5 | |
| Tongatapu | Semisi Kailahi | Independent | 1,986 | 3.9 | |
| Tongatapu | Simione Kau Silapelu | Independent | 1,544 | 3.0 | |
| Tongatapu | Semisi P I Tapueluelu | Independent | 1,528 | 3.0 | |
| Tongatapu | Mateaki Heimuli | Independent | 1,400 | 2.7 | |
| Tongatapu | ʻAlisi Pone Fotu | Independent | 952 | 1.9 | |
| Tongatapu | Mumui Tatola | Independent | 719 | 1.4 | |
| Tongatapu | Sela Lopa Kaisinga | Independent | 508 | 1.0 | |
| Tongatapu | Kamipeli Tofaʻimalaʻeʻaloa | Independent | 387 | 0.8 | |
| Tongatapu | ʻAlani Fisher Taione | Independent | 364 | 0.7 | |
| Tongatapu | Tupou Malohi | Independent | 318 | 0.6 | |
| Tongatapu | Siosifa Filini Sikuea | Independent | 257 | 0.5 | |
| Tongatapu | Siale Christopher Kava | Independent | 248 | 0.5 | |
| Tongatapu | ʻAisake Faʻalongo Filimone | Independent | 235 | 0.5 | |
| Tongatapu | Salesi Kauvaka | Independent | 231 | 0.5 | |
| Tongatapu | Sione Tuʻiʻonetoa | Independent | 202 | 0.4 | |
| Tongatapu | Hoatatau Tenisi | Independent | 194 | 0.4 | |
| Tongatapu | Penisila Save | Independent | 178 | 0.3 | |
| Tongatapu | Lesinali Tovo Faleafa | Independent | 165 | 0.3 | |
| Tongatapu | Kelepi V. Lamipeti | Independent | 157 | 0.3 | |
| Tongatapu | Semisi Nauto Tuʻapasi ʻAtaʻata | Independent | 133 | 0.3 | |
| Tongatapu | Taholo Lelea Kolovai | Independent | 128 | 0.3 | |
| Tongatapu | Sione Lolo Mataele | Independent | 87 | 0.2 | |
| Vahefonua Vavaʻu | Samiu Vaipulu | Independent | 2,272 | 15.7 | Elected |
| Vahefonua Vavaʻu | Viliami Kaufusi Helu | Independent | 2,060 | 14.3 | Elected |
| Vahefonua Vavaʻu | Sione Sangster Saulala | Independent | 1,908 | 13.2 | |
| Vahefonua Vavaʻu | ʻEtuate Sungalu Lavulavu | Independent | 1,772 | 12.3 | |
| Vahefonua Vavaʻu | Masao Paasi | Independent | 1,490 | 10.3 | |
| Vahefonua Vavaʻu | Peauafi Tatafu | Human Rights and Democracy Movement | 1,308 | 9.1 | |
| Vahefonua Vavaʻu | Sione Sosefo Mailangi | Independent | 674 | 4.7 | |
| Vahefonua Vavaʻu | Makelesi Funaki | Independent | 562 | 3.9 | |
| Vahefonua Vavaʻu | Kauhenga Kata | Human Rights and Democracy Movement | 560 | 3.9 | |
| Vahefonua Vavaʻu | ʻAlamoti Tautakitaki | Independent | 556 | 3.9 | |
| Vahefonua Vavaʻu | Sione Finau Lauti | Independent | 405 | 2.8 | |
| Vahefonua Vavaʻu | Viliami Politoni Sapoi | Independent | 188 | 1.3 | |
| Vahefonua Vavaʻu | ʻAliki Halahekeheke Sika | Independent | 152 | 1.1 | |
| Vahefonua Vavaʻu | Sione Katalau Veleika | Independent | 150 | 1.0 | |
| Vahefonua Vavaʻu | Pesa Lauʻi | Independent | 148 | 1.0 | |
| Vahefonua Vavaʻu | Makasini Fonua | Independent | 140 | 1.0 | |
| Vahefonua Vavaʻu | ʻInoke Fotu | Independent | 93 | 0.6 | |
Source: Psephos

== Aftermath ==
By-election were held on 5 May 2005 to fill vacancies in Tongatapu and Niuas following the appointment of Feleti Sevele and Sione Haukinima to the cabinet. Former Police Minister Clive Edwards was elected in Tongatapu, and Lepolo Taunisila was elected in Niuas.

A third by-election was held on 20 July 2006 for the Haʻapai electorate after Fineasi Funaki was appointed as Minister of Tourism. The election was won by ʻOsai Laatu.
