= 2021 in Tonga =

- Decades: 2000s; 2010s; 2020s
- See also: Other events of 2021; Timeline of Tongan history

Events in the year 2021 in Tonga.

== Incumbents ==
- Monarch: Tupou VI
- Prime Minister: Pōhiva Tuʻiʻonetoa (until 27 December), Siaosi Sovaleni (starting 27 December)

== Events ==
Ongoing — COVID-19 pandemic in Tonga

- 30 November – 2021 Tongan general election

== Deaths ==
- 29 July – Baroness Tuputupu Vaea, 92, royal
- 29 August – Sione Vuna Fa'otusia, 68, Tongan politician, deputy (since 2014), minister for justice and prisons (2014–2019), and deputy prime minister (2019–2020).
- 15 October – Tuineau Alipate, 54, Tongan-born American football player (Minnesota Vikings, Saskatchewan Roughriders, New York Jets).
- 12 December – Maʻafu Tukuiʻaulahi, 66, noble and politician, MP (since 2008).
- 16 December – Taniela Moa, 36, rugby union player (Auckland, Section Paloise, national team).
