= Sonatane =

Sonatane is a Tongan masculine given name. Notable people with the name include:

- Sonatane Takulua (born 1991), Tongan rugby union footballer
- Sonatane Tuʻa Taumoepeau-Tupou (1943–2013), Tongan diplomat
