= 2022 Haʻapai 12 by-election =

A by-election was held in the Tongan electorate of Haʻapai 12 on 1 September 2022. The by-election was triggered by the death of MP Viliami Hingano on 10 June 2022. Five candidates contested the by-election: former MP Moʻale Finau, Saimone Kapetaua Vuki, Sione Finau Tapu, Tevita Tu’ipulotu Vi and Tevita Vaikona.

The by-election was won by Moʻale Finau.

== Results ==
Candidate	Votes	%
Moʻale Finau	338	25.68
Saimone Vuki	332	25.23
Tevita Vaikona	301	22.87
Sione Finau Tapu	299	22.72
Tevita Tu’ipulotu	46	3.50
Total	1,316	100.00
