= Minister of Foreign Affairs (Tonga) =

Head of the Tongan Ministry of Foreign Affairs

Minister of Foreign Affairs of the Kingdom of Tonga
- Coat of arms of the Kingdom of Tonga

- Flag of Tonga

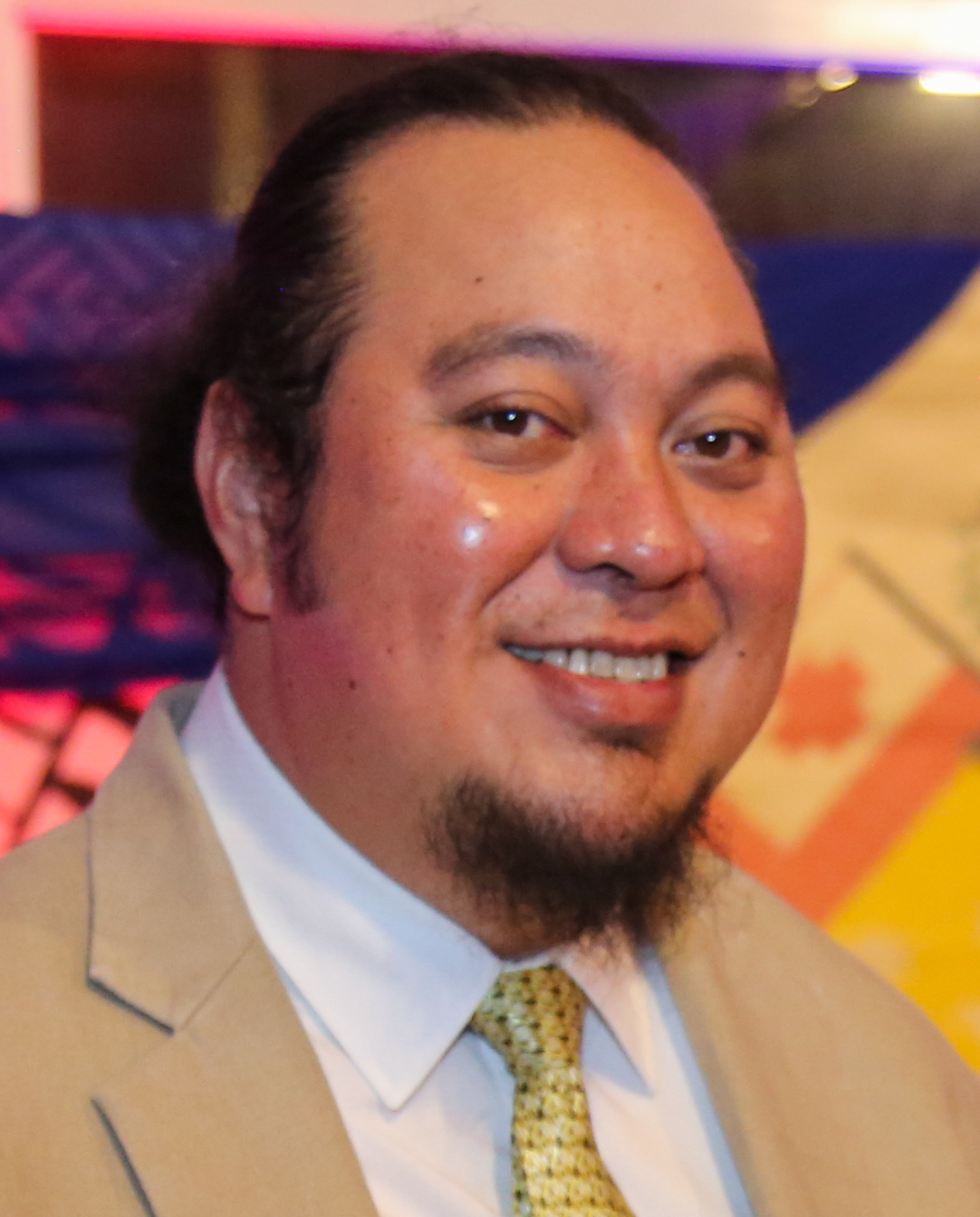
- Incumbent; Tupoutoʻa ʻUlukalala since 28 January 2025
- His Majesty's Diplomatic Service
- Status: Foreign Minister
- Abbreviation: FM
- Member of: Cabinet of Tonga; Legislative Assembly of Tonga
- Seat: Nukuʻalofa
- Nominator: Prime Minister of Tonga
- Appointer: King of Tonga
- Term length: No term limit
- Constituting instrument: Constitution of Tonga
- Inaugural holder: Fatafehi Tuʻipelehake
- Formation: 4 June 1970

The minister of foreign affairs of the Kingdom of Tonga is a cabinet minister in charge of His Majesty's Diplomatic Service, formerly the Ministry of Foreign Affairs of Tonga. It is responsible for conducting foreign relations of the country. Crown Prince Tupoutoʻa ʻUlukalala has served as foreign minister since 28 January 2025.

== Description of the office ==
Like other ministers, the foreign minister is formally appointed by the king on the nomination of the prime minister and is responsible to both the prime minister and the Legislative Assembly. The position may be held independently or in conjunction with other ministerial responsibilities. From time to time, the prime minister has also served simultaneously as foreign minister.

== List of ministers ==
Political parties

Human Rights and Democracy Movement
Democratic Party of the Friendly Islands

Other factions

Independent

Symbols

Denotes acting Minister

† Died in office

The following is a list of foreign ministers of Tonga since the country gained independence in 1970:

No.	Name (Birth–Death)	Portrait	Tenure
1	Prince Fatafehi Tuʻipelehake (1922–1999)		1970–1979
2	Crown Prince Tupoutoʻa (1948–2012) (Note: Later King George Tupou V.)		1979–1998
—	Baron Vaea (1921–2009); Acting		1998
3	Prince ʻAhoʻeitu ʻUnuakiʻotonga Tukuʻaho (born 1959) (Note: Later King Tupou VI.)		1998–2004
4	Lord Taumoepeau-Tupou of Toula and Kotu (1943–2013)		2004–2009
5	Lord Sevele of Vailahi (born 1944)		2009–2010
6	Lord Tuʻivakanō (born 1952)		2011–2014
7	ʻAkilisi Pōhiva (1941–2019)		2014–2017
8	Siaosi Sovaleni (born 1970)		2017–2018
(7)	ʻAkilisi Pōhiva (1941–2019)		2018–2019†
—	Semisi Sika (born 1968); Acting		2019
9	Pōhiva Tuʻiʻonetoa (1951–2023)		2019–2021
10	Fekitamoeloa ʻUtoikamanu (born 1959)		2021–2024
—	Siaosi Sovaleni (born 1970); Acting		2024
—	Samiu Vaipulu (born 1952); Acting		2024–2025
11	Crown Prince Tupoutoʻa ʻUlukalala (born 1985)		2025–present
