= Moʻale ʻOtunuku =

Tongan academic and politician

Member of the Tongan Parliament for Vavaʻu 14
- Incumbent
- Assumed office 28 March 2024
- Preceded by: Saia Piukala

Moʻale ʻOtunuku is a Tongan academic and politician.

‘Otunuku was educated at the University of the South Pacific, graduating with a BA in English literature and history/politics. He worked as a high school teacher in Tonga and New Zealand before studying for a master's degree in Education at the University of Auckland. His master's thesis was on the topic of Bilingualism in Tongan primary schools. He later completed a doctorate in education, and worked for the University of the South Pacific, as head of the Institute of Education's Research and Development Programme.

He was first elected to the Legislative Assembly of Tonga in the 2024 Vavaʻu 14 by-election.

He was re-elected at the 2025 election.
