= List of ambassadors of Tonga to China =

Ambassador of Tonga to China
- Incumbent; Tau’aika ’Uta’atu since April 14, 2015
- Inaugural holder: Emeline Uheina Tuita
- Formation: August 1, 2006

The Tongan Ambassador in Beijing is the official representative of the Government in Nukuʻalofa to the Government of the People's Republic of China.

== List of representatives ==
Diplomatic agreement/designated/Diplomatic accreditation	Ambassador	Observations	Prime Minister of Tonga	Premier of the People's Republic of China	Term end
May 1, 2005		The governments in Beijing and Nukuʻalofa established diplomatic relations.	Tupou VI	Wen Jiabao	
August 1, 2006	Emeline Uheina Tuita		Tupou VI	Wen Jiabao	
March 27, 2009	Mahe Uliuli Sandhurst Tupouniua	(born July 15, 1966) Since September 17, 2013, he is Tongan Ambassador to the United States	Feleti Sevele	Wen Jiabao	
March 15, 2011	Siamelie Latu		Sialeʻataongo Tuʻivakanō	Wen Jiabao	
April 14, 2015	Tau’aika ’Uta’atu	Tongan Brig. Gen.	ʻAkilisi Pōhiva	Li Keqiang	

== See also ==
- China–Tonga relations
