= Vavaʻu 16 =

Electoral constituency in Tonga

- Constituency for the Legislative Assembly of Tonga
- Region: Vavaʻu

Current constituency
- Created: 2010
- Number of members: 1
- Party: Independent
- Member: Viliami Latu

Vavaʻu 16 is an electoral constituency for the Legislative Assembly in the Kingdom of Tonga. It was established for the November 2010 general election, when the multi-seat regional constituencies for People's Representatives were replaced by single-seat constituencies, electing one representative via the first past the post electoral system. Located in the Vavaʻu island group, it encompasses the villages of Ha’alaufuli, Ta’anea, Ha’akio, Houma, Mangia, Mataika, Feletoa, Leimatu’a, Tu’anekivale, and Holonga. It is one of three constituencies in Vavaʻu. (The number 16 does not mean that it is the fifteenth in Vavaʻu, but in the country.)

Its current representative is Viliami Latu.

== Members of Parliament ==
Election	Member	Party
2010	Viliami Latu	independent
2014	ʻEtuate Lavulavu	independent
2016 by-election	ʻAkosita Lavulavu	independent
2017	ʻAkosita Lavulavu	independent
2021	Viliami Latu	independent

== See also ==
- Constituencies of Tonga
