= Migonette Patricia Durrant =

Jamaican diplomat (1943–2019)

Pat Durrant
- Born: Mignonette Patricia Durrant; 30 May 1943; Colony of Jamaica, British Empire
- Died: 26 November 2019 (aged 76); Kingston, Jamaica
- Other names: Pat Durrant
- Occupation: Career diplomat
- Known for: Work in UN
- Notable work: Permanent Representative of Jamaica to the United Nations

Pat Durrant OJ CD (born Mignonette Patricia Durrant; May 30, 1943 – November 26, 2019) was a Jamaican diplomat. She was Ambassador to Germany, Director-General in the Jamaican Ministry of Foreign Affairs, and as President of UN Security Council highlighted the effect of war on women and children. She was appointed as Jamaican Permanent Representative to the United Nations from 7 June 1995. The UN Secretary-General appointed her as the United Nations Ombudsman in April 2002 in the rank of Assistant Secretary-General; she was the first to hold this position from 2002 to 2007.

== Biography ==
Pat Durrant was born in Jamaica on 30 May 1943. She graduated from the. University of the West Indies with Bachelor of Arts (B.A.) degree and also a Diploma in International Relations. She studied at the University of Cambridge, United Kingdom and received a Diploma in Overseas Development Studies.

After her studies, she worked in the Ministry of Agriculture as Administrative Officer from 1964- 1970. She then joined the Ministry of Foreign Affairs and worked as First Secretary from 1971 to 1972, Principal Assistant Secretary from 1972 to 1974, Minister-counselor in the Permanent Mission to OAS in Washington, D.C., from 1974 to 1977, as assistant director, political division from 1977 to 1981 and deputy director from 1981 to 1983.

Durrant's initial assignment to the United Nations was as Deputy Permanent Representative from 1983 to 1987. Then she was posted as Jamaica's Ambassador to the Federal Republic of Germany from 1987 to 1992 when she also represented her country as Non-resident Ambassador to Israel, the Netherlands, Switzerland, and the Holy See. From 1992 to 1995, she worked in Jamaica in the Ministry of Foreign Affairs and Foreign Trade in the post of Director-General. She was appointed as Permanent Representative of Jamaica to the United Nations in 1995. During 1999-2001 she was President of the High-level Committee on Technical Cooperation among Developing Countries; in 1999 she was Vice Chair of the Preparatory Committee for the United Nations General Assembly Special Session on Population and Development. She was also President of the High-level Committee on Technical co-operation among developing countries from 1999 to 2001. During 2000–2001, she represented Jamaica on the Security Council and was also Vice Chair of the "Open-ended Working Group" on the Reform of the United Nations Security Council. She was also Chairperson of the UN Preparatory Committee for the Special Session on children, and Chairperson of the Consultative Committee for the UN Development Fund for women (UNIFEM).

In November 2001, as President of the Security Council she read out a statement condemning the atrocities perpetrated on civilians by the Force for the Defense of Democracy (FDD) and the National Liberation Front (FNL) in Burundi and appealed for ceasefire and peaceful negotiations to the conflict.

After.retirement Durrant became very involved in many charitable organizations, including the United Nations Women's Guild (Jamaica Chapter) where she held the post of president for years. She died on November 26, 2019, shortly after having been diagnosed with pancreatic cancer.

== Awards ==
Durrant is the recipient of several awards for her career achievements. These are: the Order of Distinction of Jamaica in the rank of Commander (C.D.) in 1992; the Order of Jamaica (O.J.) by the Government of Jamaica for her unique achievements in respect of international affairs in 2000 (the ideal of the Order is "For a covenant of the People"}.; and honoured as one of the University of the West Indies's Distinguished Graduates on the occasion of the fiftieth anniversary the university in 1998. She was also honoured with the Distinguished Achievement Award by the World Association of Former United Nations Interns and Fellows (WAFUNI).

== Bibliography ==
- Publications, Europa (2003). The International Who's Who 2004. Psychology Press. ISBN 978-1-85743-217-6.
- Sleeman, Elizabeth (2001). The International Who's Who of Women 2002. Psychology Press. ISBN 978-1-85743-122-3.
