= Viela Tupou =

Tongan civil servant

Viela Tupou is a Tongan civil servant. She has served as Tonga's High Commissioner to the United Kingdom and as Tonga's Lord Chamberlain.

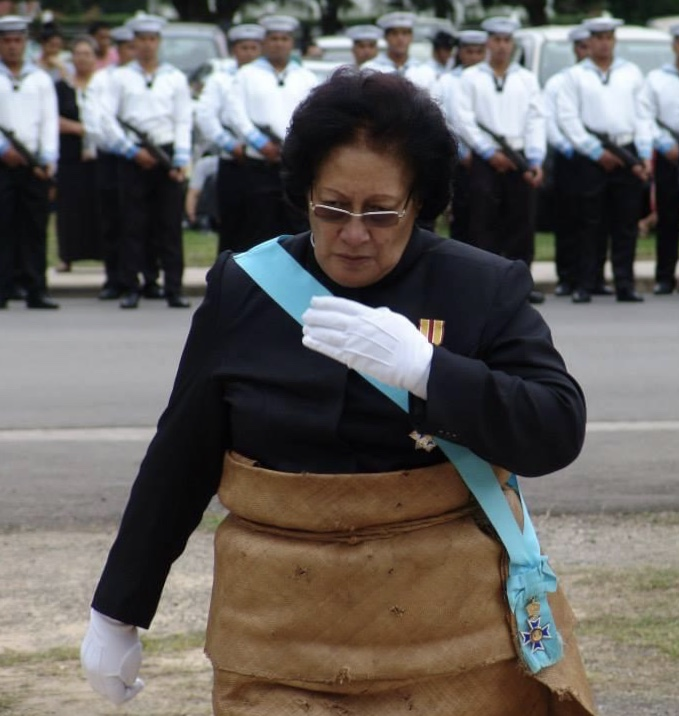
Viela Tupou, Lord Chamberlain of Tonga

== Biography ==
Tupou held the position of Acting Secretary for Foreign Affairs in the late 1990s. In 1999 she was appointed Chief Protocol Officer for Tonga's diplomatic mission to the United Kingdom. She was High Commissioner to the United Kingdom until 2005.

== Personal life ==
Tupou was married to fellow civil servant Colonel 'Aloua Fetu'utolu Tupou until his death in April 2005.

== Honours ==
National honours

- Order of Queen Sālote Tupou III, Grand Cross (31 July 2008).
