= United Nations Office of the High Representative for the Least Developed Countries, Landlocked Developing Countries and Small Island Developing States =

Office of the United Nations Secretariat

The United Nations Office of the High Representative for the Least Developed Countries, Landlocked Developing Countries and Small Island Developing States (UN-OHRLLS) is an office of the United Nations Secretariat which deals with the Least Developed Countries, Landlocked Developing Countries, and Small Island Developing States. It was founded in 2001 by United Nations resolution 56/227.

== Mandate ==
The office has several roles for its client group. For the Programme of Action for the Least Developed Countries, it helps to ensure implementation of the program and supports the UN Economic and Social Council in assessing progress. It supports follow-up of the Almaty Declaration and Programme of Action for Transit Transport Cooperation between Landlocked and Transit Developing Countries, and the UN Programme of Action for the Sustainable Development of Small Island Developing States. It carries out relevant advocacy and seeks international support for its client group with the UN and society generally and it supports consultation within its client group.

For SIDS the office supports them in intergovernmental processes, advocates for their special consideration and resource mobilization as well as coordinates the support provided by the UN and the international community for sustainable development in SIDS. The SAMOA Pathway is a central policy document for sustainable development in SIDS and the work of OHRLLS.

== List of High Representatives ==
- 2002–2007: Anwarul K. Chowdhury
- 2007–2012: Cheick Sidi Diarra
- 2012–2017: Gyan Chandra Acharya
- 2017–2021: Fekitamoeloa ‘Utoikamanu
- 2021–2022: Earle Courtenay Rattray
- 2022- 2024: Rabab Fatima
- 2024- Present:Roland Mollerus
