= Permanent Representative of Jamaica to the United Nations =

Coordinates: 40.754248°N 73.971395°W

- Incumbent; Brian Wallace since September 16, 2021
- Inaugural holder: Egerton Rudolph Richardson
- Formation: 1962

The Jamaican Permanent Representative to the United Nations in New York City is the official representative of the Government in Kingston, Jamaica to the Headquarters of the United Nations.

== History ==
- On September 21, 1962 Jamaica was admitted to the United Nations.

== List of representatives ==
Diplomatic accreditation	Ambassador	Observations	Prime Minister of Jamaica	Secretary-General of the United Nations	Term end
1962	Egerton Rudolph Richardson		Alexander Bustamante	U Thant	1967
1967	Keith Johnson (Jamaican diplomat)	(*July 29, 1921 in Spanish Town) 1969 non-resident ambassador to Buenos Aires. educated at Kingston College and Columbia	Donald Sangster	U Thant	1973
1973	Donald Owen Mills	(* July 23, 1921 en Mandeville, Jamaica)	Michael Manley	Kurt Waldheim	1981
1981	Egerton Rudolph Richardson		Edward Seaga	Kurt Waldheim	1984
1984	Lloyd Melville Harcourt Barnett		Edward Seaga	Javier Pérez de Cuéllar	1989
1989	Herbert Samuel Walker		Michael Manley	Javier Pérez de Cuéllar	1992
1992	Lucille M. Mair		P. J. Patterson	Boutros Boutros-Ghali	1995
1995	Migonette Patricia Durrant		P. J. Patterson	Boutros Boutros-Ghali	2002
2002	Stafford Neil		P. J. Patterson	Kofi Annan	2006
2006	Raymond Wolfe		Portia Simpson Miller	Kofi Annan	April 25, 2013
April 25, 2013	Earle Courtenay Rattray	(* October 21, 1959 in London)	Andrew Holness	Ban Ki-moon	2021
September 16, 2021	Brian Wallace		Andrew Holness	António Guterres	
