= List of ambassadors of Tonga to the United States =

Coordinates: 40.755498°N 73.968649°W

Ambassador of Tonga to the United States
- Inaugural holder: Inoke Faletau
- Formation: March 30, 1979

== List of representatives ==
Diplomatic agrément	Diplomatic accreditation	Ambassador	Observations	Prime Minister of Tonga	List of presidents of the United States	Term end
March 29, 1979	March 30, 1979	Inoke Faletau		Fatafehi Tuʻipelehake	Jimmy Carter	
April 4, 1984	April 13, 1984	Sonatane Tuʻa Taumoepeau-Tupou		Fatafehi Tuʻipelehake	Ronald Reagan	
July 15, 1987	July 20, 1987	Siaosi Taimani ʻAho		Fatafehi Tuʻipelehake	Ronald Reagan	
August 14, 1989	August 14, 1989	Siosaia Ma'Ulupekotofa Tuita		Fatafehi Tuʻipelehake	George H. W. Bush	
August 13, 1992	September 8, 1992	Sione Kite (1940)	resident in London (* January 8, 1940) A career civil servant, has spent a quarter century in high government office in Tonga and the diplomatic service and, for a time, served with the South Pacific Commission.: In 1967 he was Secondary school teacher.; From 1969 to 1972 he was Assistant secretary Office of Prime Minister Government of Tonga.; From 1972 to 1973 he was 1st secretary High Commission of Tonga, London.; From 1975 to 1979 he was Assistant director administration South Pacific Commission, Nouméa, New Caledonia.; From 1979 to 1992 he was Deputy chief secretary, deputy secretary to cabinet Office Prime Minister Government of Tonga.; In 1992 he became concurrently high commissioner to United Kingdom, ambassador to United States of America, Belgium, Denmark, France, Germany, Italy, Luxembourg, The Netherlands, Russia, Switzerland and the European Community London.	Baron Vaea	George H. W. Bush	
February 10, 1997	February 11, 1997	Akosita Fineanganofo	resident in London	Baron Vaea	Bill Clinton	
June 9, 2000	September 5, 2000	Sonatane Tuʻa Taumoepeau-Tupou	resident in New York City	Baron Vaea	Bill Clinton	
May 20, 2005	May 26, 2005	Fekitamoeloa ʻUtoikamanu		Tupou VI	George W. Bush	
February 22, 2010	February 24, 2010	Sonatane Tuʻa Taumoepeau-Tupou	Sonatane Tu'a Tauraoepeau-Tupou	Feleti Sevele	Barack Obama	2010
September 10, 2013	September 17, 2013	Mahe Uliuli Sandhurst Tupouniua				2014

- Tonga–United States relations
