= Earle Courtenay Rattray =

Jamaican diplomat

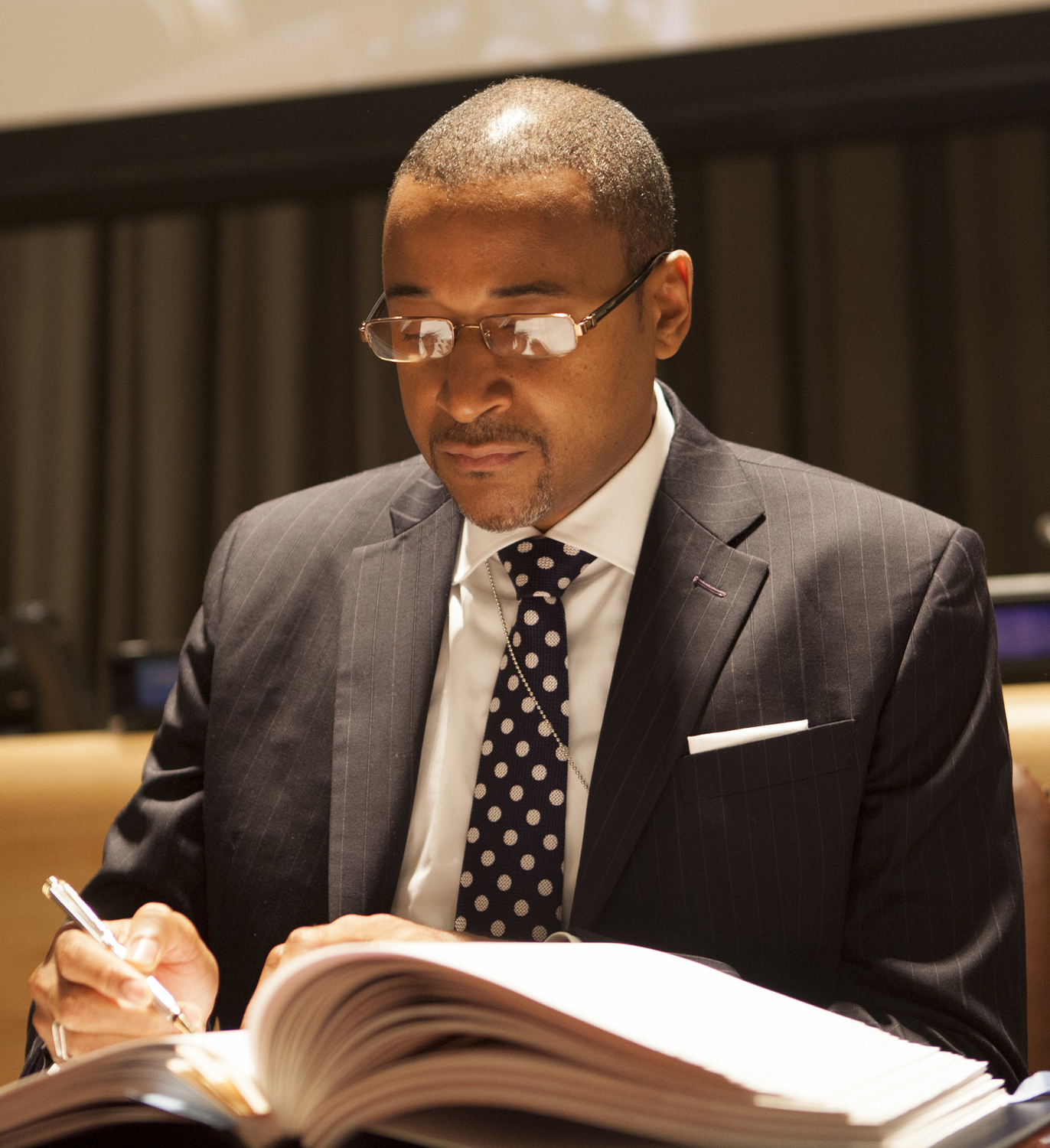

Chef de Cabinet to United Nations Secretary General
- Incumbent
- Assumed office December 2021
- Preceded by: Maria Luiza Ribeiro Viotti

United Nations High Representative for Least Developed, Landlocked Countries, Small Island Developing States
- Incumbent
- Assumed office April 2021
- Preceded by: Fekitamoeloa ʻUtoikamanu

Jamaican Permanent Representative to the United Nations of Jamaica to United Nations
- In office 2013–2021
- Preceded by: Raymond Wolfe
- Succeeded by: Brian Wallace

Jamaican Ambassador to China of Jamaica to China
- In office 2008–2013
- Preceded by: Wayne McCook
- Succeeded by: Ralph Samuel Thomas

Personal details
- Born: October 21, 1959 (age 66) London
- Spouse: married
- Children: four
- Education: Master of Science in international business from South Bank University in London as well as a Bachelor of Arts in international studies from West Virginia Wesleyan College, and is currently pursuing Master of Arts studies at Tufts University's Fletcher School of Law and Diplomacy in the United States.

Earle Courtenay Rattray (born October 21, 1959) is a Jamaican diplomat who has been serving as the United Nations High Representative for the Least Developed Countries, Landlocked Developing Countries and Small Island Developing States since 2021.

== Early life and education ==
Rattray holds a Master of Arts degree from the Fletcher School of Law and Diplomacy at Tufts University, a Master of Arts in International Business from the London South Bank University and a Bachelor of Arts in International Studies from West Virginia Wesleyan College. He was awarded a Doctor of Humane Letters (Honoris Causa) by West Virginia Wesleyan College.

== Early career ==
Before he joined the foreign service, Rattray served as Executive Director of the Jamaica Marketing Company in London (1990–1997) and Director of Marketing and Promotions at the Jamaica National Export Corporation in Kingston (1987–1988).

== Career in the diplomatic service ==
- From 2001 to 2005 he was Deputy Chief of Jamaica's Embassy in Washington, D.C.
- From 2005 to 2008 he was Director of the Bilateral Relations Department in the Ministry of Industry and Investment, in Kingston.
- From 2008 to April 25, 2013 he was ambassador in Beijing.

From 2013 until 2021, Rattray served as Jamaica's Permanent Representative to the Headquarters of the United Nations. In this capacity, he chaired the United Nations General Assembly First Committee. In December 2021, he was appointed Chef de Cabinet to the UN Secretary General António Guterres.
