= 2023 Tongatapu 8 by-election =

A by-election was held in the Tongan electorate of Tongatapu 8 on 19 January 2023. The by-election was triggered by the death of Semisi Fakahau on 27 October 2022. The election was won by Johnny Taione.

In January 2023, the Democratic Party of the Friendly Islands announced Sosefo Ngavisi Hēhea as its candidate. Three other candidates contested the by-election: Johnny Taione, Viliami Sisifā, and Sipaisi Kutu.

Johnny Taione won the seat.

== Results ==
Candidate	Votes	%
Johnny Taione	743	39.17
Viliami Sisifā	577	30.42
Sosefo Ngavisi Hēhea	409	21.56
Sipaisi Kutu	168	8.86
Total	1,897	100.00
Valid votes	1,897	99.84
Invalid/blank votes	3	0.16
Total votes	1,900	100.00
