= Tongatapu 8 =

Electoral constituency in Tonga

- Constituency for the Legislative Assembly of Tonga
- Region: Tongatapu

Current constituency
- Created: 2010
- Number of members: 1
- Party: Independent
- Member(s): Johnny Taione

Tongatapu 8 is an electoral constituency for the Legislative Assembly in the Kingdom of Tonga. It was established for the November 2010 general election, when the multi-seat regional constituencies for People's Representatives were replaced by single-seat constituencies, electing one representative via the first past the post electoral system. Located on the country's main island, Tongatapu, it encompasses the villages of Malapo, Vaini, Longoteme, Folaha, Nukuhetulu, Kauvai, and Veitongo.

Its first ever representative was Sione Taione, a first time MP, representing the Democratic Party of the Friendly Islands. At the 2014 election he was replaced by Semisi Fakahau, who held it until his death in 2022. The subsequent by-election was won by Johnny Taione.

== Members of Parliament ==
Election	Member	Party
2010	Sione Taione	Democratic Party of the Friendly Islands
2014	Semisi Fakahau	Democratic Party of the Friendly Islands
2017	Semisi Fakahau	Democratic Party of the Friendly Islands
2021	Semisi Fakahau	Democratic Party of the Friendly Islands
2023 by-election	Johnny Taione	Independent

== Election results ==
=== 2010 ===
Tongan general election, 2010: Tongatapu 8
Party	Candidate	Votes	%	±%
DPFI	Sione Havea Taione	901	34.1	
(unknown)	Lui ‘Aho	770	29.1	
(unknown)	Fataimoemanu Lafaele Vaihu	474	17.9	
(unknown)	Siaosi ‘Etika Moleni	177	6.7	
PLT	Sioape Tu’iono	118	4.5	
(unknown)	Mosese Senituli Manu	83	3.1	
(unknown)	Simote Po’uliva’ati	66	2.5	
(unknown)	Simione Kau Silapelu	32	1.2	
(unknown)	Nakita Talanoa	20	0.8	
(unknown)	Solo Fefioloi Solomone La’akulu	5	0.2	
Majority		131	5	n/a
DPFI win (new seat)				

=== 2014 ===
Along with five other incumbent DPFI MPs, Sione Taione was not selected as a DPFI candidate for this election, and announced he would be running as an independent candidate.

Tongan general election, 2014: Tongatapu 8
Party	Candidate	Votes	%	±%
(unknown)				
Turnout				

== See also ==
- Constituencies of Tonga
