= Viliami Latu =

Tongan politician

The Honourable Viliami Latu MP
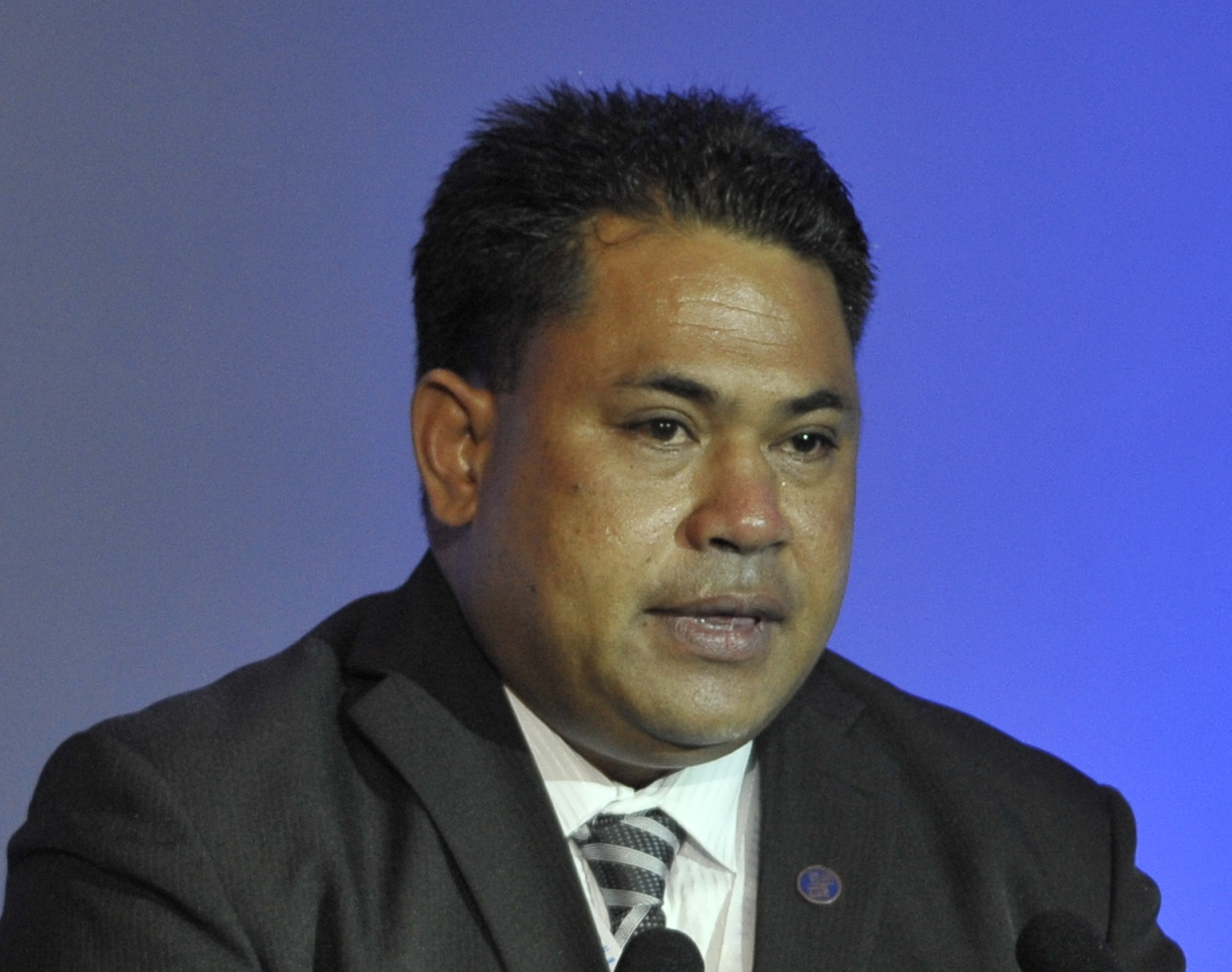

Deputy Prime Minister of Tonga
- Incumbent
- Assumed office 6 January 2026
- Prime Minister: Fatafehi Fakafānua
- Preceded by: Taniela Fusimalohi
Other offices held
Minister of Tourism
In office 28 March 2024 – 28 January 2025
Preceded by	Fekitamoeloa ʻUtoikamanu
Succeeded by	Moʻale Finau
In office 1 September 2011 – 27 November 2014
Prime Minister	Sialeʻataongo Tuʻivakanō
Preceded by	ʻIsileli Pulu
Succeeded by	Pōhiva Tuʻiʻonetoa
Minister for Trade and Economic Development
In office 28 December 2021 – 28 January 2025
Prime Minister	Siaosi Sovaleni
Preceded by	Tatafu Moeaki
Succeeded by	Kāpelieli Lanumata
Minister for Police, Prisons and Fire Services
In office 4 January 2010 – 31 August 2011
Prime Minister	Sialeʻataongo Tuʻivakanō
Preceded by	Viliami Tangi
Succeeded by	Lisiate ʻAloveita ʻAkolo

Member of Parliament for Vavaʻu 16
- Incumbent
- Assumed office 18 November 2021
- Preceded by: ʻAkosita Lavulavu
- In office 25 November 2010 – 27 November 2014
- Preceded by: Constituency established
- Succeeded by: ‘Etuate Lavulavu

Personal details
- Party: Independent
- Education: ʻAtenisi University (BA); University of Auckland (MA); Ritsumeikan Asia Pacific University (PhD)

Dr. Viliami Uasike Latu is a Tongan politician who has served as Deputy Prime Minister of Tonga since January 2026.

After completing secondary education at Tonga High School, he became a high school teacher at the Mailefihi & Siuʻilikutapu College (in Vavaʻu) in 1991. He obtained a Bachelor of Arts degree from ʻAtenisi University in 1995, then continued his studies at the University of Auckland (New Zealand), obtaining a Graduate Diploma in Arts degree in 1997, then a Master of Arts degree in political science in 1999. He returned to Tonga to work as a civil servant, and served as Assistant Secretary to the Prime Minister's Office from 2000 to 2003, before beginning doctoral studies in Japan, on a scholarship provided by the Japanese government. He completed his Ph.D. in Asia Pacific Studies at the Ritsumeikan Asia Pacific University in 2006.

Returning to Tonga, he served as principal assistant secretary to the Prime Minister's Officer in 2006 and 2007, then (briefly) as assistant to the chief executive officer and public relations officer at the Ministry of Education in 2008. In May of that year, he was appointed clerk of the Legislative Assembly of Tonga.

He stood unsuccessfully as an independent candidate for a People's Representative seat in Vavaʻu in the April 2008 general election. He received 12.7% of the vote in Vavaʻu, finishing third of twenty-two candidates, and thus narrowly missing out on being elected as one of Vavaʻu's two representatives. He stood again in the November 2010 general election, and this time was easily elected in constituency 16 (one of Vavaʻu's three newly established constituencies), with 43.7% of the vote. New prime minister Lord Tuʻivakanō subsequently appointed him to Cabinet as Minister for Police, Prisons and Fire Services. The appointment was controversial as Latu had previously been charged with assaulting his wife. In August 2011 he attracted further controversy by refusing to renew the contract of police commissioner Chris Kelley, effectively firing him, and appointing himself as acting police commissioner.

On September 1, 2011, he was reshuffled to the Ministry for Tourism. He lost his seat in the November 2014 general election. He stood again at the 2016 Vavaʻu 16 by-election and in the 2017 election but was unsuccessful.

He was re-elected to the seat of Vavaʻu 16 in the 2021 election. On 28 December 2021 he was appointed to the Cabinet of Siaosi Sovaleni as Minister of Trade and Economic Development.

On 28 March 2024 he was appointed Minister of Tourism, following the resignation of Fekitamoeloa ʻUtoikamanu.

Following the resignation of Siaosi Sovaleni he was nominated for the position of Prime Minister as the government's candidate. On 24 December 2024, he was defeated by ʻAisake Eke by 16 votes to 8.

He was re-elected at the 2025 election. Latu was appointed deputy prime minister after the election, serving in the cabinet of Prime Minister Fatafehi Fakafānua, and was also assigned the portfolios of trade and justice. Latu, along with most of cabinet, was sworn in on 6 January 2026.

Legislative Assembly of Tonga
New seat	Member of Parliament for Vavaʻu 16; 2010–2014	Succeeded by ‘Etuate Lavulavu
Preceded by ʻAkosita Lavulavu	Member of Parliament for Vavaʻu 16; 2021–present	Incumbent
Political offices
Preceded by Viliami Tangi	Minister for Police, Prisons and Fire Services; 2010–2011	Succeeded by Lisiate ʻAloveita ʻAkolo
Preceded by ʻIsileli Pulu	Minister for Tourism; 2011–2014	Succeeded by Pōhiva Tuʻiʻonetoa
Preceded by Tatafu Moeaki	Minister for Trade and Economic Development; 2021–2025	Succeeded by Kāpelieli Lanumata
Preceded by Fekitamoeloa ʻUtoikamanu	Minister for Tourism; 2024–2025	Succeeded by Moʻale Finau
Preceded by Taniela Fusimalohi	Deputy Prime Minister of Tonga; 2026–present	Incumbent
