= Johnny Taione =

Tongan politician

Johnny Grattan Vaea Taione

Member of Parliament for Tongatapu 8
- In office 19 January 2023 – 20 November 2025
- Preceded by: Semisi Fakahau
- Succeeded by: Viliami Sisifa

Johnny Grattan Vaea Taione is a Tongan politician and former Member of the Legislative Assembly of Tonga. He is the older brother of former MP Sione Havea Taione.

Johnny Grattan Vaea Taione was first elected to Parliament in the 2023 Tongatapu 8 by-election. He had previously run as a candidate in Tongatapu 8 in the 2021 Tongan general election.

He lost his seat at the 2025 election.
