= 2025 in Tonga =

- Decades: 2000s; 2010s; 2020s
- See also: Other events of 2025; Timeline of Tongan history

Events in the year 2025 in Tonga.

== Incumbents ==
- Monarch: Tupou VI
- Prime Minister: Samiu Vaipulu (acting, until 22 January), ʻAisake Eke (starting 22 January)

== Events ==
=== January ===
- 22 January – King Tupou VI formally appoints ʻAisake Eke as prime minister.
- 28 January – King Tupou VI inaugurates the cabinet of ʻAisake Eke, which includes Crown Prince Tupoutoʻa ʻUlukalala as foreign minister.

=== February ===
- 19 February – The government declares a dengue fever outbreak after rising cases nationwide.

=== March ===
- 31 March – A magnitude 7.1 earthquake hits off the coast of Haʻapai.

=== April ===
- 12 April – The first Tonga Police medical facility is launched.

=== November ===
- 20 November – 2025 Tongan general election

=== December ===
- 15 December – Fatafehi Fakafānua is elected as prime minister by the Legislative Assembly.
- 16 December – US President Donald Trump issues a proclamation imposing partial travel restrictions on Tongan nationals travelling to the United States.

== Holidays ==
- 1 January – New Year's Day
- 18 April – Good Friday
- 21 April – Easter Monday
- 25 April – Anzac Day
- 2 June – Emancipation Day
- 4 July – King Tupou IV Day
- 17 September – Crown Prince's Birthday
- 4 November – Constitution Day
- 4 December – King Tupou I Day
- 25 December – Christmas Day
- 26 December – Boxing Day
