= 'Aloua Fetu'utolu Tupou =

Tongan politician and military officer (died 2005)

ʻAloua Fetuʻutolu Tupou
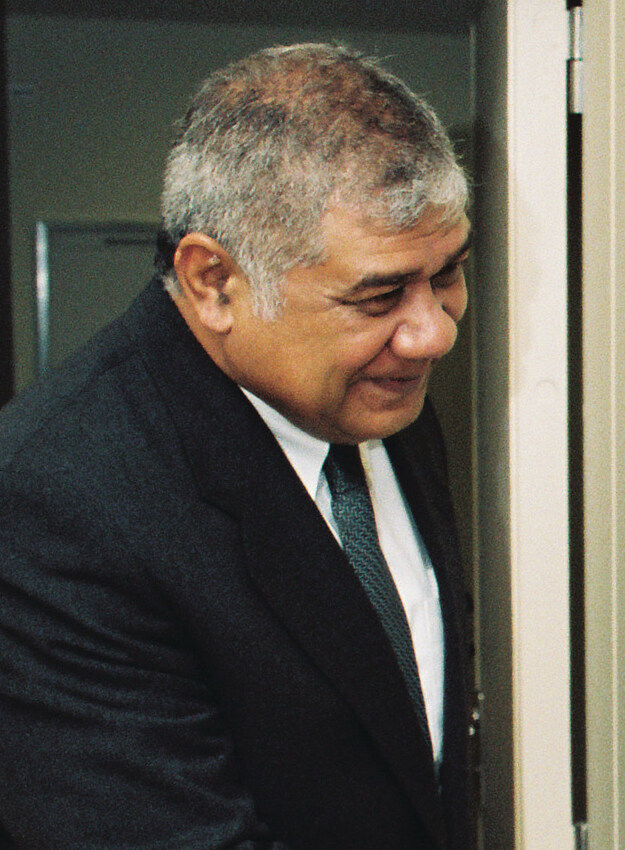
- In office 13 September 2004 – April 2005
- Preceded by: ʻUlukālala Lavaka Ata
- Succeeded by: Sonatane Tuʻa Taumoepeau-Tupou

Personal details
- Died: April 2005 Nukuʻalofa, Tonga

ʻAloua Fetuʻutolu Tupou (died April 2005) was a Tongan military officer, diplomat and Cabinet Minister.

Tupou was the first Tongan to be appointed Commander of the Tongan Defence Services serving from 1977 to 2000. Tupou was the second cousin of King Tupou IV. He was also second cousins with King Tupou VI. His mother, Hon. Luseane Talahiva Kupuovanua, was a first cousin of the late Queen Salote Tupou III. Hon. Talahiva was adopted at birth by Hon. Akanesi Tuifua Veikune (older sister of Hon. Salote Heu'ifanga Maumautaimi Veikune Ahome'e who was the mother of the late Queen Halaevalu Mata'aho Tuku'aho).

In December 1999, he was appointed High Commissioner to the United Kingdom, taking office in May 2000. From London, he also served as Ambassador to Belgium, Denmark, France, Germany, Israel, Italy, Luxembourg, Netherlands, the Russian Federation, Switzerland, the European Commission and the European Economic Community. In September 2004, he was appointed Minister of Defence in the Cabinet of Prince ʻUlukālala Lavaka Ata. He died in April 2005 of heart failure.

Tupou was married to fellow civil servant Viela Tupou.
