= 2020 in Tonga =

- Decades: 2000s; 2010s; 2020s
- See also: Other events of 2020; Timeline of Tongan history

Events in the year 2020 in Tonga.

== Incumbents ==
- Monarch: Tupou VI
- Prime Minister: Pōhiva Tuʻiʻonetoa

== Events ==
Ongoing – COVID-19 pandemic in Oceania

=== May ===
- 22 May – Even though no cases have been reported in the country, various travel and quarantining restrictions were put in place. Cruise ships and yachts were also banned from docking in the country.

=== March ===
- 27 March – Prime Minister Pohiva Tu'i'onetoa announced that the country would be under a lock-down from 29 March until 5 April.
