= List of ambassadors of Jamaica to China =

Coordinates: 39.909478°N 116.437986°E

Ambassador of Jamaica to China
- Incumbent; Antonia Hugh since March 17, 2017
- Inaugural holder: Derrick Heaven
- Formation: 1992

The Jamaican Ambassador in Beijing is the representative of the government in Kingston (Jamaica), the government of the People's Republic of China. The Jamaican Ambassador is also commissioned as high commissioner (Commonwealth).

The Jamaican Ambassador is concurrently non-resident ambassador in Hanoi (Vietnam) and Vientiane (Laos), Dhaka (Bangladesh), Singapore and Islamabad (Pakistan).

== List of representatives ==
Diplomatic agrément/Diplomatic accreditation	ambassador	Observations	Prime Minister of Jamaica	Premier of the People's Republic of China	Term end
1992	Derrick Heaven	with residence in Tokyo: 1981 Minister for Industry and Commerce; 1994: High Commissioner to the UK, non-resident ambassador to Denmark and Norway	Percival J. Patterson	Li Peng	
September 24, 1994	Earl Alexander Carr	with residence in Tokyo	Percival J. Patterson	Li Peng	
May 23, 2003	Paul Anthony Robotham	with residence in Tokyo	Percival J. Patterson	Wen Jiabao	
July 27, 2005	Wayne McCook		Percival J. Patterson	Wen Jiabao	2008
January 15, 2009	Earle Courtenay Rattray	Jamaica's Permanent Representative to the United Nations in New York	Bruce Golding	Wen Jiabao	
October 11, 2013	Ralph Samuel Thomas		Andrew Holness	Li Keqiang	September 8, 2015
August 2015	Fay Pickersgill		Andrew Holness	Li Keqiang	

== See also ==
- China–Jamaica relations
