= Fineasi Funaki =

Tongan politician (1966– 2010)

Viliami Tangi

Minister of Tourism
- In office 17 May 2006 – September 2010
- Prime Minister: Feleti Sevele
- Succeeded by: Feleti Sevele

Personal details
- Born: 1966
- Died: 13 November 2010 (aged 43–44) Suva, Fiji

Fineasi Funaki (1966 – 13 November 2010) was a Tongan politician and cabinet Minister. He was a member of the Human Rights and Democracy Movement.

Funaki was educated at Tonga College and the Tongan teachers' training college, before studying at Brigham Young University–Hawaii. He was elected People's Representative for Ha'apai at the 2005 election. He was appointed Minister of Tourism in May 2006, and was reappointed after the 2008 election. In January 2008 he was accused of corruption after depositing a cheque from the Chinese Embassy to the Ministry into his personal bank account. A subsequent report from the Auditor-General found that he had broken the law by depositing a cheque from the Chinese Embassy into his personal bank account and recommended that he be asked to resign. Prime Minister Feleti Sevele refused the recommendation of asking for Funaki's resignation, blaming the misappropriation of funds on inexperience, but Funaki forfeited his salary for three months and was forced to apologise.

Funaki resigned from Cabinet in September 2010 due to ill-health. He died in Suva while undergoing treatment later that year.

== Honours ==
National honours

- Order of Queen Sālote Tupou III, Grand Cross (31 July 2008).
