= ʻAmelia Afuhaʻamango Tuʻipulotu =

Tonga's minister for health

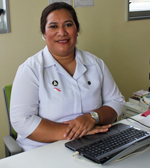

Minister for Health
- In office 10 October 2019 – 28 December 2021
- Prime Minister: Pohiva Tuʻiʻonetoa
- Preceded by: Saia Piukala
- Succeeded by: Saia Piukala

Personal details
- Party: none

ʻAmelia Afuhaʻamango Tuʻipulotu is a Tongan nurse and former Minister of Health.

== Career ==
Tuʻipulotu trained as a nurse, and worked in Australia and Tonga. She received an Australian Development Scholarship to attend the University of Sydney, and in 2012 became the first Tongan to receive a Nursing PhD. After graduation, she worked for Tonga's Ministry of Health, becoming Matron of the Nursing Department at Vaiola Hospital in Tonga, heading the nurse training.

In October 2019 she was appointed Minister of Health in the cabinet of Pohiva Tuʻiʻonetoa. Tuʻipulotu was the only Minister from outside the Legislative Assembly of Tonga.

In May 2020 she was elected to a position of Rapporteur on the World Health Organization's executive board. In December 2021 newly elected Prime Minister Siaosi Sovaleni replaced her as Minister of Health, reappointing her predecessor Saia Piukala. In December 2022 she was appointed the WHO's Chief Nursing Officer.

== Honours ==
National honours

- Order of the Crown of Tonga, Member (6 July 2021).
