= Mohenoa Puloka =

Tongan academic and director (1946–2022)

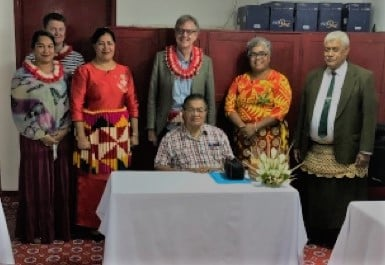
- Puloka (seated) in 2020

Governor of Ha'apai
- In office 26 June 2018 – 25 January 2021
- Prime Minister: ʻAkilisi Pōhiva
- Preceded by: Moʻale Finau
- Succeeded by: Viliami Hingano

Personal details
- Born: 26 November 1946
- Died: 4 August 2022 (aged 75)

Tēvita Tonga Mohenoa Puloka (26 November 1946 – 4 August 2022) was a Tongan academic and religious leader. From 2018 to 2021 he served as Governor of Haʻapai.

From 2005 to 2010, Puloka was the principal of Siaʻatoutai Theological College.

Puloka served as a director of the Free Wesleyan Church of Tonga. In 2013 when eight ministers were caught misusing church funds he pushed for accountability and for ministers to be insulated from financial matters. In 2014 he opposed a strike by the Tongan Public Service Association as it would threaten the economy.

In November 2017 he was appointed to the Tonga Tradition Committee by Tupou VI. He later released a book in 2017 on his upbringing.

In June 2018 he was appointed Governor of Ha’apai. As Governor he was responsible for disaster management for Cyclone Tino. He was replaced as Governor by Viliami Hingano in January 2021.
