= Haʻapai 12 =

Electoral constituency in Tonga

- Constituency for the Legislative Assembly of Tonga
- Region: Haʻapai

Current constituency
- Created: 2010
- Number of members: 1
- Party: Independent
- Member(s): Moʻale Finau

Haʻapai 12 is an electoral constituency for the Legislative Assembly in the Kingdom of Tonga. It was established for the November 2010 general election, when the multi-seat regional constituencies for People's Representatives were replaced by single-seat constituencies, electing one representative via the first past the post electoral system. Located in the Haʻapai island group, it encompasses the villages of Pangai, Hihifo, Ha‘ato‘u, Navea, Holopeka, Koulo, ‘Uiha, Felemea, and Lofanga. It is one of two constituencies in Haʻapai, the other being Haʻapai 13. (The number does not mean that it is the twelfth in Haʻapai, but in the country.)

Its first ever representative was Moʻale Finau, a first time MP, of the Democratic Party of the Friendly Islands. He lost the seat in 2014 to Viliami Hingano, regained it in 2017, then lost it again to Hingano in 2021. Finau regained the seat at the 2022 Ha’apai 12 by-election following Hingano's death.

== Members of Parliament ==
Election	Member	Party
2010	Moʻale Finau	Democratic Party of the Friendly Islands
2014	Viliami Hingano	independent
2017	Moʻale Finau	Democratic Party of the Friendly Islands
2021	Viliami Hingano	independent
2022 by-election	Moʻale Finau	Democratic Party of the Friendly Islands

== Election results ==
=== 2010 ===
Tongan general election, 2010: Haʻapai 12
Party	Candidate	Votes	%	±%
DPFI	Moʻale Finau	470	31.9	
(unknown)	Viliami Hingano	306	20.8	
(unknown)	Paula Vi	280	19.0	
(unknown)	Latiume Kaufusi	174	11.8	
(unknown)	Tevita ‘Ova	71	4.8	
(unknown)	Mosese Moimoi Fakahua	70	4.8	
(unknown)	Sione Tuʻitupou Fotu	39	2.6	
(unknown)	Sione Fekau Mafileʻo	38	2.6	
(unknown)	Langilangi Vimahi	16	1.1	
(unknown)	Penisimani Tavalu Fatafehi	8	0.5	
Majority		164	11.1	n/a
DPFI win (new seat)				

== See also ==
- Constituencies of Tonga
