= Moʻale Finau =

Tongan politician

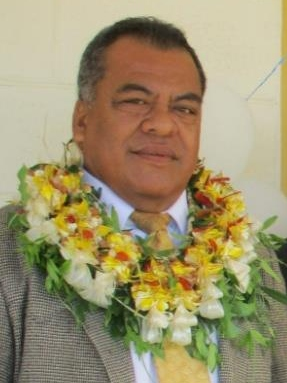
- Finau in 2016

Minister for Justice
- Incumbent
- Assumed office 28 January 2025
- Prime Minister: ʻAisake Eke
- Preceded by: Samiu Vaipulu

Minister for Tourism
- Incumbent
- Assumed office 28 January 2025
- Preceded by: Viliami Latu

Governor of Haʻapai
- In office 9 February 2015 – 26 June 2018
- Prime Minister: ʻAkilisi Pōhiva
- Preceded by: Havea Tu‘iha‘angana
- Succeeded by: Mohenoa Puloka

Member of Parliament for Haʻapai 12
- In office 1 September 2022 – 20 January 2025
- Preceded by: Viliami Hingano
- Succeeded by: Saimone Vuki
- In office 16 November 2017 – 18 November 2021
- Preceded by: Viliami Hingano
- Succeeded by: Viliami Hingano
- In office 25 November 2010 – 27 November 2014
- Preceded by: none (constituency established)
- Succeeded by: Viliami Hingano
- Majority: 11.1%

Personal details
- Born: 10 February 1960 (age 66)
- Party: Democratic Party of the Friendly Islands

Moʻale Finau (born 10 February 1960) is a Tongan politician and former Cabinet Minister.

He is a member of the Democratic Party of the Friendly Islands.

Finau has a Master of Arts degree in Geography and a Certificate in Law. He worked as a teacher, businessman and leadership training officer before entering politics. He stood unsuccessfully as an independent for the seat of Haʻapai in both the 2005 and 2008 general elections. In the 2010 general election he stood in the new Haʻapai 12 constituency for the Democratic Party of the Friendly Islands, and was elected with 31.9% of the vote. He lost the seat by 4 votes in the 2014 election.

In February 2015, Finau was appointed Governor of Ha'apai. In May 2016 he was charged with careless driving after injuring a man while driving in Tongatapu. In September 2017 the Auditor-General found that he had unlawfully spent T$150,000 from a community development fund on his own projects.

He was re-elected to the Legislative Assembly in the 2017 Tongan general election. He lost his seat again in the 2021 Tongan general election. He was re-elected in the 2022 Ha’apai 12 by-election.

On 28 January 2025 he was appointed to the cabinet of ʻAisake Eke as Minister for Justice and Minister for Tourism.

He lost his seat at the 2025 election.
