= 2016 Vavaʻu 16 by-election =

A by-election was held in the Vavaʻu 16 constituency in Tonga on 14 July 2016. It followed the conviction and unseating of MP ‘Etuate Lavulavu for bribery and campaign overspending, in January.

There were four candidates: ‘Akosita Lavulavu (wife of the unseated MP), Viliami Latu (who held the seat as an independent from 2010 to 2014), ‘Atalasa Pouvalu, and ‘Ipeni Siale. The election was won by ‘Etuate Lavulavu's wife ‘Akosita Lavulavu, who thereby became the only female member in Parliament.

== Result ==
The results were as follows:

Vavaʻu 16 by-election, 2016
Party	Candidate	Votes	%	±%
Independent	‘Akosita Lavulavu	754	39.4 %	n/a
Independent (politician)	Viliami Latu	536	28 %	+0.5 %
(unknown)	‘Atalasa Pouvalu	343	17.9 %	n/a
(unknown)	‘Ipeni Siale	280	14,7 %	−0.8 %
Majority		218	11.4 %	
‘Akosita Lavulavu gain from ‘Etuate Lavulavu				

== 2014 result ==
The result in Vavaʻu 16 in the 2014 general election had been as follows:

Tongan general election, 2014: Vavaʻu 16
Party	Candidate	Votes	%	±%
Independent	‘Etuate Lavulavu	767	33.64 %	n/a
Independent	Viliami Latu	627	27.50 %	−16.2 %
Democrats	‘Ipeni Siale	346	15.18 %	n/a
(unknown)	Tupoulahi Manuofetoa	212		
(unknown)	‘Aisea Siliveinusi	135		
(unknown)	Viliami Lolohea	106		
(unknown)	‘Ikani Taliai	87		
Majority		140	6.14 %	
‘Etuate Lavulavu gain from Viliami Latu				
