= Sonatane Tuʻa Taumoepeau-Tupou =

Tongan ambassador (1943–2013)

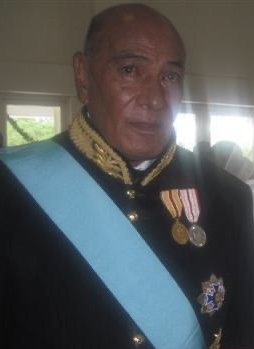
Taumoepeau-Tupou in 2000.

Sonatane Tu'akinamolahi Taumopeau Tupou, Lord Taumoepeau-Tupou of Toula and Kotu (born 14 March 1943, in Nukuʻalofa, died 13 August 2013) was a diplomat from the Kingdom of Tonga. Lord Taumoepeau-Tupou had been the foreign minister of Tonga since 24 August 2004, though his appointment was not announced until 2 September 2004. He had also been Minister of Defense since April 2005 till his death.

Taumoepeau-Tupou was Tonga's third foreign minister, after King George Tupou V (at that time: Tupoutoʻa Lavaka), and most recently Prince ʻAhoʻeitu ʻUnuakiʻotonga Tukuʻaho (at that time: Lavaka Ata ʻUlukālala). Taumoepeau-Tupou was a career diplomat. He had previously been Tonga's first ambassador to the United Nations after Tonga joined the United Nations in September 1999. During his tenure at the United Nations he was also accredited as Tonga's Ambassador to the United States and High Commissioner to Canada.

On 1 May 2009, he relinquished his position as a Cabinet Minister, to take up more diplomatic positions.

== Early life ==
Taumoepeau-Tupou was born in Nukuʻalofa, Tonga to Samiuela Ma'afu Tupou and Lu'isa Ma'ume'afo'ou Taumoepeau. He was raised by Tevita Fa'ahivalu Taumoepeau and 'Ainise Kilinalivoni Tongilava. He attended primary school in Nukuʻalofa and Neiafu on Vava'u and continued his secondary education at Newington College, Stanmore, Sydney in 1953–1962, where he was known as Tom Tu'a. He later received his Bachelor of Science degree in Political Science from the University of Hawaiʻi, under a scholarship from the East-West Center.

He married 'Amelia Latuniua Ahome'e, the youngest daughter of the Noble 'Ahome'e and Heu'ifanga Veikune. They had four children, and one of his daughters, Princess Marcella Kalaniuvalu-Fotofili (known previously as Lady Kalaniuvalu-Fotofili) married the son of Princess Mele Siu'ilikutapu Kalaniuvalu-Fotofili (eldest daughter of Sione Ngū Manumataongo and Princess Melenaite Tupoumoheofo Veikune) and Prince Kalaniuvalu-Fotofili (whom was formerly known as Lord Kalaniuvalu-Fotofili).

== Career ==
He joined the Tongan Civil Service in 1969 as an assistant secretary in the prime minister's office. He was commissioned as a first lieutenant in the Tonga Defence Services in 1971 and was posted to the Tonga High Commission in London as a First Secretary in 1973. In 1977 he re-joined the prime minister's office as an assistant secretary and was seconded to the Palace Office, where he was promoted to deputy secretary in 1978 and also appointed secretary to the Tongan Defence Board.

He was promoted to secretary for foreign affairs in 1979 and in 1983 he was posted as Tonga's High Commissioner to the United Kingdom and concurrently appointed as ambassador to the then European Community and the European Commission as well as to Belgium, Denmark, France, Germany, Italy, Luxembourg, the Netherlands, the then Soviet Union and the United States of America.

In 1986 he returned to the Ministry of Foreign Affairs as Secretary for Foreign Affairs. In 1999 he was appointed Ambassador Extraordinary and Plenipotentiary and Permanent Representative of Tonga to the United Nations and further appointed concurrently as Tonga's Ambassador Extraordinary and Extraordinary and Plenipotentiary to the United States and Tonga's High Commissioner to Canada before being recalled to take up his ministerial appointments.

Since his appointment as Foreign Minister Taumoepeau-Tupou was also appointed as Tonga's Acting defence minister on 22 April 2005 following the sudden death of Colonel 'Aloua Fetu'utolu Tupou. He was also appointed as the Acting Governor of Vava'u following the death of the Hon. ʻAkauʻola.

In June 2009, Taumoepeau-Tupou became Tonga's Permanent Representative to the United Nations, a position that has concurrent accreditation as Tongan Ambassador to the United States, Chile, Cuba, Mexico, and Venezuela, and Tongan High Commissioner to Canada. He presented his credentials as Ambassador to the United States of America on 22 February 2010. He presented his credentials as High Commissioner to Canada on 19 May 2010.

On 28 March 2011, he was created a Tongan life peer by King George Tupou V with the noble title of Lord Taumoepeau-Tupou of Toula and Kotu.

== Controversy ==
In April 2010, a 3-year Royal Land Commission investigation headed by Lord Fielakepa as chairman investigated corrupt land dealing, and implicated that Taumoepeau-Tupou had acted unethically in his role as Acting Governor of Vava'u. The final land commission report stated "that the Acting Governor Tu'a Taumoepeau has a lot of explaining to give" and recommended that Government investigate the whole background to the registration and the involvement of the then Acting Governor Tu'a Taumoepeau in these dealings.

== Honours ==
=== National honours ===
==== Orders ====
- Order of Queen Sālote Tupou III, Grand Cross (31 July 2008).

==== Medals ====
- King Taufa’ahau Tupou IV Coronation Silver Jubilee Medal (4 July 1992).
- King George Tupou V Coronation Medal (1 Augusto 2008).

Preceded by	Permanent Representative to the United Nations; 1999–2004	Succeeded by Fekita 'Utoikamanu
Preceded by ʻAhoʻeitu ʻUnuakiʻotonga Tukuʻaho (Lavaka Ata ʻUlukālala)	Minister for Foreign Affairs; 24 August 2004–2013	Vacant
Preceded by Fetu'utolu Tupou	(Acting) Minister of Defence; 22 April 2005–2013	Vacant
Preceded by ʻAkauʻola	(Acting) Governor of Vava'u; 2005–2013	Vacant
