= 2005 Niuas by-election =

The Niuas by-election of 2005 was held on 5 May 2005 to elect a new People's Representative to the Tongan Legislative Assembly. The vacancy occurred following the appointment of the incumbent, Sione Haukinima, to cabinet. The by-election was won by Lepolo Taunisila, who became the first woman to sit in the Legislative Assembly in twenty years.

Niuas by-election, 5 May 2005 (1 member)
Party	Candidate	Votes	%	±%
Independent	Lepolo Taunisila	455	37.0	
Independent	Feinga 'Iloa	335	27.2	
Independent	Falaniai Taukei'aho	236	19.2	
Independent	Oketi Lotulelei 'Akau'ola	129	10.5	
Independent	Sione Kietonga Lauteau Holi	76	6.2	
Turnout		1231	100.0	

Results from Matangi Tonga.
