= Sione Taione =

Tongan politician (born 1971)

Percy Sione Havea Taione
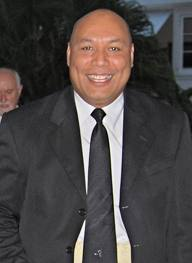

Member of Parliament for Tongatapu 8
- In office 25 November 2010 – 27 November 2014
- Preceded by: none (constituency established)
- Succeeded by: Semisi Fakahau
- Majority: 5.0%

Personal details
- Born: 2 September 1971 (age 55)
- Party: Democratic Party of the Friendly Islands
- Education: University of the South Pacific

Percy Sione Havea Taione (born September 2, 1971), more commonly known as Sione Taione, is a Tongan politician. He belongs to the Seventh-day Adventist Church and serves as an Elder for the Malapo Church in Tonga.

He attended Beulah Primary School and continued to secondary at Beulah College. He continued onto tertiary education and obtained a Diploma in Law from the University of the South Pacific. He began working in the Supreme Court as a translator in 1990 and in 1997 became an interpreter. He became the Supreme Court Registrar in 2005. In all he has been working at the Supreme Court of Tonga for 20 years. He is one of the first qualified mediators in Tonga and is also the legal advisor for the Tongan Public Service Association (PSA) before going into politics. There is only one other qualified mediator in Tonga.

His career in national politics began when he was elected People's Representative for the eighth constituency of Tongatapu in the November 2010 general election. Standing as a candidate for the Democratic Party of the Friendly Islands, he obtained 34.1% of the vote, seeing off nine other candidates.

In July 2014 Taione was dumped as a Democratic Party candidate. He ran as an independent in the 2014 Tongan general election, but failed to win re-election.
