= Semisi Fakahau =

Tongan politician (1948–2022)

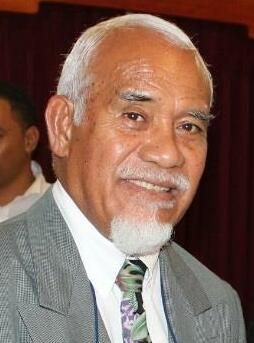
- Fakahau in 2017

Minister for Fisheries
- In office 28 December 2021 – 27 October 2022
- Prime Minister: Siaosi Sovaleni
- Preceded by: Lord Tuʻilakepa
- In office 30 December 2014 – 10 October 2019
- Prime Minister: ʻAkilisi Pōhiva
- Preceded by: Sangster Saulala
- Succeeded by: Lord Tuʻilakepa

Minister for Agriculture, Food, and Forests
- In office 30 December 2014 – 23 January 2019
- Prime Minister: ʻAkilisi Pōhiva
- Preceded by: Sangster Saulala
- Succeeded by: Losaline Ma'asi

Member of Parliament for Tongatapu 8
- In office 27 November 2014 – 27 October 2022
- Preceded by: Sione Taione
- Succeeded by: Johnny Taione

Personal details
- Born: 11 February 1948 Tonga
- Died: 27 October 2022 (aged 74) Tongatapu, Tonga
- Party: Democratic Party of the Friendly Islands

Semisi Tauelangi Fakahau (11 February 1948 − 27 October 2022) was a Tongan politician and Cabinet Minister. He was a member of the Democratic Party of the Friendly Islands.

Fakahau was educated at Vudal Agricultural College in Papua New Guinea. Before entering politics he was Principal Fisheries Officer for the Tongan Government, a fisheries advisor to the Commonwealth Secretariat, and a freelance fisheries consultant.

Fakahau was first elected to the Legislative Assembly of Tonga at the 2014 Tongan general election, and was appointed Minister for Agriculture, Food, Forestry and Fisheries. He was re-elected in the 2017 Tongan general election and reappointed to Cabinet. In January 2019 his portfolio was split, with Losaline Ma'asi taking Agriculture, Food, and Forestry and Fakahau retaining Fisheries.

Following the death of ʻAkilisi Pōhiva he was not appointed to the cabinet of Pohiva Tuʻiʻonetoa.

He was re-elected in the 2021 election. On 28 December 2021, he was appointed to the Cabinet of Siaosi Sovaleni as Minister of Fisheries.

Fakahau died on 27 October 2022 in Tongatapu, Tonga, at the age of 74.
