= COVID-19 pandemic in Tonga =

Ongoing COVID-19 viral pandemic in Tonga

- Disease: COVID-19
- Pathogen: SARS-CoV-2
- Location: Tonga
- First outbreak: Wuhan, China
- Index case: Nukuʻalofa
- Arrival date: 29 October 2021
- Confirmed cases: 16,992
- Deaths: 13
- Fatality rate: 0.08%
- Vaccinations: 77,390 (fully vaccinated)

The COVID-19 pandemic in Tonga was part of the worldwide pandemic of coronavirus disease 2019 (COVID-19) caused by severe acute respiratory syndrome coronavirus 2 (SARS-CoV-2). The virus was confirmed to have reached Tonga on 29 October 2021 with a traveller who tested positive in quarantine. Several more cases were found in January and February 2022 in a minor outbreak during the aftermath of the 2022 Hunga Tonga–Hunga Ha'apai eruption and tsunami as other countries delivered aid. Tonga had followed a "COVID-free" policy.

== Background ==
On 12 January 2020, the World Health Organization (WHO) confirmed that a novel coronavirus was the cause of a respiratory illness in a cluster of people in Wuhan, Hubei Province, China, which was reported to the WHO on 31 December 2019.

The case fatality ratio for COVID-19 globally has been much lower than the SARS outbreak between 2002 and 2004, but the transmission rates have been substantially greater, with a consequently more significant total death toll.

On 27 March 2020, Prime Minister Pohiva Tu'i'onetoa announced that the country would be under a lockdown from 29 March through 5 April.

As a precautionary measure, various travel and quarantining restrictions were put in place. Cruise ships and yachts were banned from docking in the country. There were no confirmed cases of COVID-19 in Tonga in mid-August, according to the WHO, and by 15 August, 51,816 vaccine doses had been administered.

== Timeline ==
Cases

Deaths

=== 2021 ===
On 29 October, Tonga reported its first confirmed case, who was a seasonal worker returning from Christchurch in New Zealand. On 1 November, the Tongan government imposed a seven-day lockdown on the main island of Tongatapu. Public gatherings except funerals were banned while most economic activities apart from banks and essential services were ordered to close down. The sale of alcohol was also banned. In response to the new reported case, there were reports of long queues outside vaccination centers, banks, Western Union outlets and shops. During the lockdown, 124 people were arrested for violating those restrictions.

=== 2022 ===
By 16 January 2022, there was only one case in Tonga, who had recovered from the virus. The country's zero-COVID policy had caused complications with international aid following the 2022 Hunga Tonga–Hunga Ha'apai eruption and tsunami. To keep the country virus-free, an Australian aid flight had to return to base after detecting a case midflight, while HMAS Adelaide made plans to stay at sea after 23 members of its crew tested positive for COVID-19.

On 1 February, Tongan Prime Minister Siaosi Sovaleni and Minister of Health Dr. Saia Piukala confirmed that two positive cases had been detected in port workers at the wharf in Nuku'alofa. The two workers and their families went into isolation at an army base. The Tongan Government confirmed that the island country would go into lockdown at 6 pm on 2 February. By 4 February, a few contacts of the port workers (one's wife and two children as well as a possible fourth contact) had also tested positive, while one of the port workers tested negative on a second test. By 5 February, there were 7 cases in Tonga, including 5 active cases and 2 recoveries. In response to the rise in new cases, the Tongan Government extended the lockdown until 6pm on 6 February. On 7 February, the Tongan Government extended the nationwide lockdown by two weeks in response to rising cases. By 9 February, Tonga had reported 20 new cases in the past 24 hours, bringing the total number to 34. Clusters were reported in Pili, Fasi, Vaini, Sopu, and Hala'ano. At least three cases had recovered. On 14 February, New Zealand eliminated Tonga from its quarantine free travel list due to rising cases. Tongans entering NZ from 15 February were to undergo rapid antigen testing. Those entering New Zealand from 22 February were required to self-isolate for seven days and to take rapid antigen testing. The same day, Tonga reported a total of 139 cases, with 75 reported over the previous three days.

On 11 March 2022, Tonga reported its first death from this virus. On 12 March, Prime Minister Sovaleni confirmed that he had tested positive for COVID-19 and was in isolation. As cases continued to rise, Prime Minister Sovaleni announced that the Tongan Government would impose a "hard lockdown" including closing businesses for a week and limiting travel to visiting health facilities and plantations. By 28 March, Tonga had reported a total of 6,144 active cases and 6 deaths.

By 31 August, there were a total of 16,182 cases and 12 deaths.

== COVID-19 vaccination ==
On 5 August 2021, the Tongan government introduced legislation amending the Public Health Act to allow compulsory COVID-19 vaccination. The bill passed in its first reading by 17 to 0 votes.

By 2 February 2022, 85% of Tonga's eligible population had been fully vaccinated. Following the early February outbreak, Australia and New Zealand confirmed that they would fast track shipments of vaccine doses to Tonga.

By 18 March 2022, 98% of Tonga's population had received their first dose; 90% their second dose; and 47% had received their booster shot.

== Statistics ==
Cases by Administrative subdivisions (as of 16 August 2022)
Division	Cases	Active	Recovered	References
'Eua	224	122	102	
Haʻapai	930	47	883	
Ongo Niua (Niuafo'ou)	49	46	3	
Ongo Niua (Niuatoputapu)	159	70	89	
Tongatapu	11,177	757	10,394	
Vavaʻu	1,597	0	1,595	
5/5	14,136	1,042	13,066	

== See also ==
- COVID-19 pandemic in Oceania
