= Vavaʻu 14 =

Electoral constituency in Tonga

- Constituency for the Legislative Assembly of Tonga
- Region: Vavaʻu

Current constituency
- Created: 2010
- Number of members: 1
- Party: Democratic Party of the Friendly Islands
- Member: Saia Piukala

Vavaʻu 14 is an electoral constituency for the Legislative Assembly in the Kingdom of Tonga. It was established for the November 2010 general election, when the multi-seat regional constituencies for People's Representatives were replaced by single-seat constituencies, electing one representative via the first past the post electoral system. Located in the Vavaʻu island group, it encompasses the villages of Pangaimotu, ‘Utulei, ‘Utungake, Talihau, Taoa, Vaimalo, Tefisi, Tu'anuku, Longomapu, Taunga, Kapa, ‘Otea, Falevai, Matamaka, Nuapapu, Lape, Ovaka, Hunga, Holeva, Koloa, Olo'ua, Ofu, and Okoa. It is one of three constituencies in Vavaʻu. (The number 14 does not mean that it is the fourteenth in Vavaʻu, but in the country.)

Its first ever representative was Lisiate ‘Akolo, elected MP for the first time, though he was appointed Minister for Labour, Commerce and Industries, from outside Parliament, by Prime Minister Feleti Sevele in 2006, and thus sat in Parliament ex officio from 2006 to 2010. He stood in the 2010 general election as an independent candidate, against one of the incumbent MPs for the heretofore two-seat constituency of Vavaʻu, ‘Etuate Lavulavu, also an independent. ‘Akolo was elected, with a 5.3% lead over Lavulavu. He remained Minister for Labour. he lost the seat to Saia Piukala in 2014, who has held it ever since.

== Members of Parliament ==
| Election | Member | Party |
|---|---|---|
| 2010 | Lisiate ‘Akolo | independent |
| 2014 | Saia Piukala | independent |
| 2017 | Saia Piukala | independent |
| 2021 | Saia Piukala | independent |

== Election results ==
=== 2010 ===
Tongan general election, 2010: Vavaʻu 14
| Party | Candidate | Votes | % | ±% |
|---|---|---|---|---|
| Independent | Lisiate ‘Akolo | 665 | 28.0 | |
| Independent | ‘Etuate Lavulavu | 540 | 22.7 | |
| (unknown) | Paula Piveni Piukala | 502 | 21.1 | |
| (unknown) | Tu‘amelie He Lotu Faaitu‘a Kemoe‘atu | 380 | 16.0 | |
| (unknown) | Peauafi Pifeleti | 209 | 8.8 | |
| (unknown) | Siale Fifita | 51 | 2.1 | |
| (unknown) | Pita Vi Hala‘api‘api | 32 | 1.3 | |
| Majority | | 125 | 5.3 | n/a |
| independent (politician) win (new seat) | | | | |

== See also ==
- Constituencies of Tonga
