= Saia Piukala =

Tongan politician

Saia Ma’u Piukala
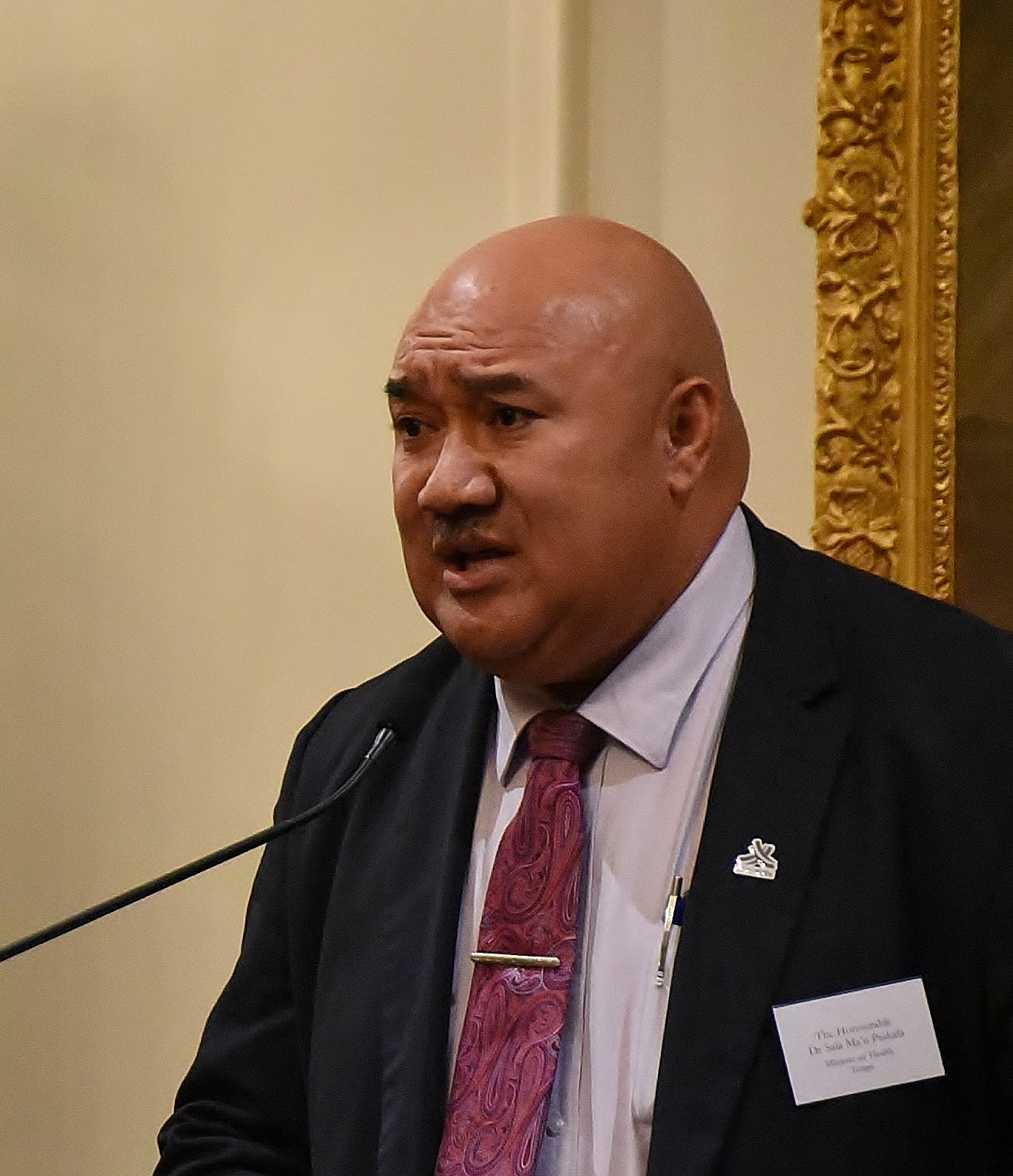
- Saia Piukala in 2018

Minister for Health
- In office 28 December 2021 – 12 January 2024
- Prime Minister: Siaosi Sovaleni
- Preceded by: ʻAmelia Afuhaʻamango Tuʻipulotu
- Succeeded by: Siale ‘Akau’ola
- In office 30 December 2014 – 10 October 2019
- Prime Minister: ʻAkilisi Pōhiva
- Preceded by: Tonga Tuʻiʻafitu
- Succeeded by: ‘Amelia Afuha’amango Tu’ipulotu

Minister for Internal Affairs and Sports
- In office 23 January 2019 – 10 October 2019
- Preceded by: Losaline Ma'asi
- Succeeded by: Vatau Hui

Minister for Public Enterprises
- In office 4 January 2018 – 23 January 2019
- Preceded by: Poasi Tei
- Succeeded by: ʻAkilisi Pōhiva

Member of Parliament for Vavaʻu 14
- In office 27 November 2014 – 12 January 2024
- Preceded by: Lisiate ‘Akolo
- Succeeded by: Mo’ale ‘Otunuku

Personal details
- Party: none

Saia Ma’u Piukala is a Tongan politician, surgeon, and former Cabinet Minister.

Piukala was trained as a surgeon at the Fiji School of Medicine in Suva, Fiji. Before entering politics he worked as a surgeon for the Tongan Ministry of Health. He was first elected to the Legislative Assembly of Tonga as representative for Vavaʻu 14 in the 2014 Tongan general election and was appointed Minister of Health in the cabinet of ʻAkilisi Pōhiva. He was re-elected in the 2017 election and reappointed as Minister of Health and Public Enterprises. In January 2019 a minor reshuffle saw him swap his Public Enterprises portfolio for Internal Affairs.

In May 2019 Piukala was appointed to the World Health Organization executive board.

Following the death of ʻAkilisi Pōhiva and his replacement by Pohiva Tuʻiʻonetoa in October 2019 he was not reappointed to Tuʻiʻonetoa's new Cabinet.

He was re-elected in the 2021 election. On 28 December 2021 he was appointed to the Cabinet of Siaosi Sovaleni as Minister of Health.

On 12 January 2024 he resigned as a Minister and from parliament to take up a role as WHO Regional Director for the Western Pacific Region Office. He was replaced as health minister by Siale ‘Akau’ola.
