= 2002 Tongan general election =

General elections were held in Tonga on March 7, 2002, to elect members of the Legislative Assembly of Tonga. Supporters of the Human Rights and Democracy Movement (HDRM) won seven of the nine seats for people's representatives. Voter turnout was 48.9%.

Following the election, HRDM leader 'Akilisi Pohiva was arrested and charged with sedition over allegations of royal corruption published during the run-up to the election. He was later acquitted by a jury.
