= Viliami Hingano =

Tongan politician (1975–2022)

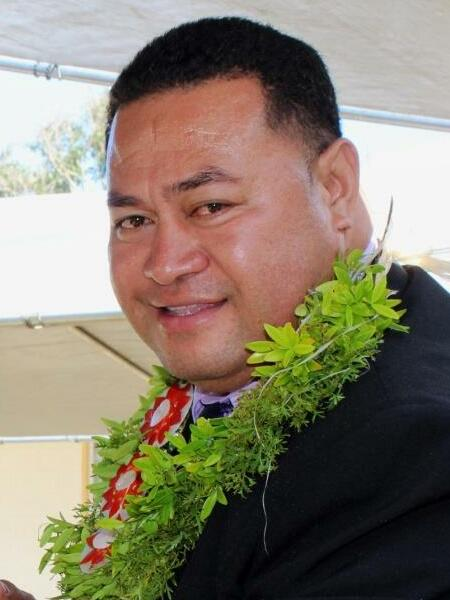
- Hingano in 2016

Minister for Agriculture, Food, Forests
- In office 28 December 2021 – 10 June 2022
- Prime Minister: Siaosi Sovaleni
- Preceded by: Lord Tu’ilakepa
- Succeeded by: Sione Siale Fohe

Governor of Haʻapai
- In office 25 January 2021 – 28 December 2021
- Prime Minister: Pōhiva Tuʻiʻonetoa
- Preceded by: Mohenoa Puloka
- Succeeded by: Pita Faiva Taufatofua

Member of Parliament for Haʻapai 12
- In office 18 November 2021 – 10 June 2022
- Preceded by: Moʻale Finau
- In office 27 November 2014 – 16 November 2017
- Preceded by: Moʻale Finau
- Succeeded by: Moʻale Finau

Personal details
- Born: 1975
- Died: 10 June 2022 (aged 47) Auckland, New Zealand
- Party: None

Viliami Manuopangai Faka’osiula Hingano (1975 – 10 June 2022) was a Tongan politician and Cabinet Minister.

== Biography ==
Hingano ran in the 2010 Tongan general election but was unsuccessful. He was elected to the Legislative Assembly of Tonga at the 2014 election, but his election was disputed, leading to a recount, which he won. In parliament, he generally sided with the Noble faction, opposing the government of ʻAkilisi Pōhiva's decision to withdraw from hosting the Pacific Games, and opposing it in confidence votes. In June 2016 he advocated for higher salaries for MPs.

Hingano was defeated at the 2017 election, losing to Moʻale Finau. In January 2021 he was appointed Governor of Haʻapai by Prime Minister Pōhiva Tuʻiʻonetoa. Shortly after being appointed he was convicted of unlawful possession of 198 kg of turtle meat. He was fined T$12,000, but allowed to retain his position.

He was re-elected to the Legislative Assembly at the 2021 election. On 28 December 2021 he was appointed to the Cabinet of Siaosi Sovaleni as Minister for Agriculture, Food and Forests. Immediately after being appointed he flew to New Zealand for medical treatment.

Hingano died in Auckland on 10 June 2022 at the age of 47.
