= ʻAkosita Lavulavu =

Tongan politician

The Honourable ʻAkosita Havili Lavulavu MLA
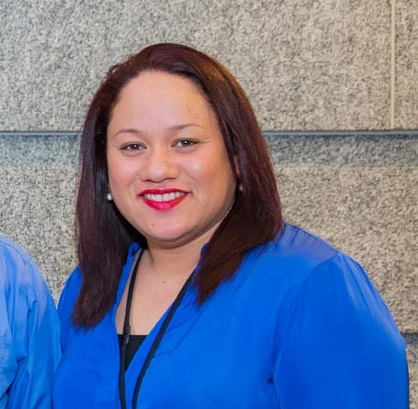
- 'Akosita Lavulavu in 2016

Minister for Infrastructure and Tourism
- In office 10 October 2019 – 28 December 2021
- Prime Minister: Pohiva Tuʻiʻonetoa
- Preceded by: Semisi Sika
- Succeeded by: Sevenitini Toumoʻua (Infrastructure); Fekitamoeloa ʻUtoikamanu (Tourism)

Minister for Internal Affairs, Women, Culture, Youth and Sports
- In office 18 January 2018 – 11 April 2018
- Prime Minister: ʻAkilisi Pōhiva
- Preceded by: ʻAkilisi Pōhiva
- Succeeded by: Losaline Ma'asi

Member of the Legislative Assembly of Tonga for Vavaʻu 16
- In office 16 July 2016 – 18 November 2021
- Preceded by: ʻEtuate Lavulavu
- Succeeded by: Viliami Latu

Personal details
- Born: 1985 (age 40–41) Tonga
- Party: People's Party
- Spouse: ʻEtuate Lavulavu
- Education: Brigham Young University–Hawaii; University of the South Pacific

ʻAkosita Havili Lavulavu (born 1985) is a Tongan politician and former Cabinet Minister. In 2021 she was jailed for fraud.

Lavulavu is the wife of former MP ʻEtuate Lavulavu. She was educated at Tonga High School, with tertiary study at Brigham Young University–Hawaii, earning a Bachelor in Information System, and the University of the South Pacific, earning an MBA.

Before entering politics, she was the director of the Unuaki ʻo Tonga Royal Institute. Following her husband's conviction for bribery in 2016 she stood in the resulting 2016 Vavaʻu 16 by-election and was elected to the Legislative Assembly of Tonga, becoming the 5th female MP in Tonga's history. She was re-elected at the 2017 general election, after which she was appointed Minister of Internal Affairs and Sports.

On 3 March 2018, Lavulavu and her husband were both arrested on fraud charges stemming from their management of the ʻUnuaki ʻo Tonga Royal Institute in 2016. She was subsequently sacked from her Ministerial position.

Following the death of ʻAkilisi Pōhiva Lavulavu supported Pohiva Tuʻiʻonetoa for Prime Minister, leaving the DPFI to join Tuʻiʻonetoa's new People's Party. While still awaiting trial, in October 2019 she was appointed Minister for Infrastructure and Tourism in the cabinet of Pohiva Tuʻiʻonetoa. On 4 June 2021 she and her husband were convicted of 3 counts of obtaining money by false pretenses. On 17 June, she took leave from her ministerial position until the case was resolved. On 2 July 2021, she and her husband were sentenced to six years in prison by the Supreme Court of Tonga. On 11 October 2022 the convictions were quashed by the Court of Appeal, and the case sent back to the Supreme Court for retrial.
