= Fekitamoeloa ʻUtoikamanu =

Tongan politician

Fekitamoeloa Katoa ʻUtoikamanu
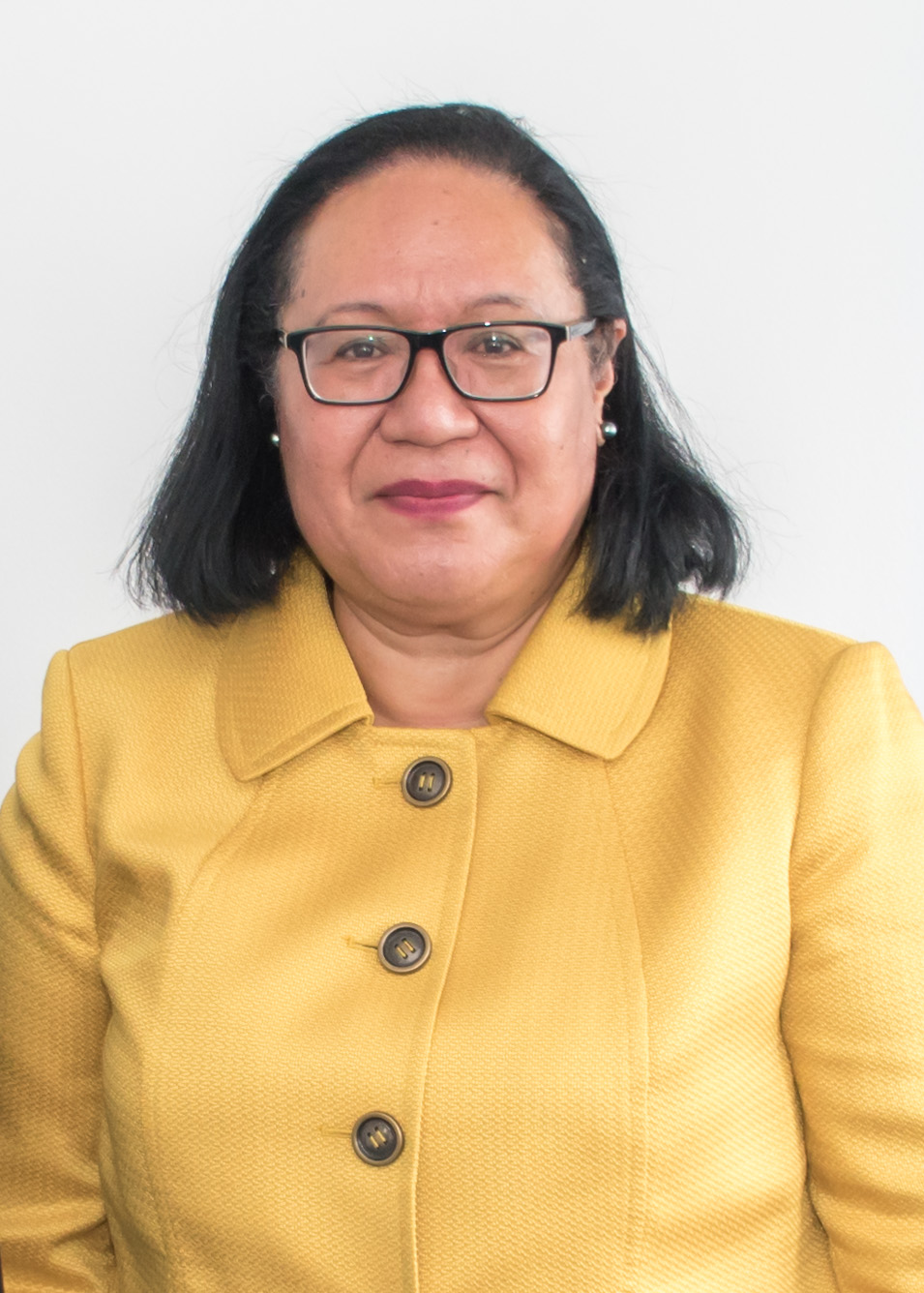
- 'Utoikamanu in 2017

Minister of Foreign Affairs
- In office 28 December 2021 – 28 March 2024
- Prime Minister: Siaosi Sovaleni
- Preceded by: Pōhiva Tuʻiʻonetoa
- Succeeded by: Siaosi Sovaleni (acting)

Minister of Tourism
- In office 28 December 2021 – 28 March 2024
- Preceded by: ʻAkosita Lavulavu
- Succeeded by: Viliami Latu

Personal details
- Born: December 1959 (age 66)

Fekitamoeloa Katoa ʻUtoikamanu (born December 1959) is a Tongan civil servant, diplomat and former Cabinet Minister. From 2005 to 2009 she was Tonga's permanent ambassador to the United Nations, and from 2017 to 2021 she was United Nations High Representative for the Least Developed Countries, Landlocked Developing Countries and Small Island Developing States. From 2021 to 2024 she was minister of foreign affairs.

== Early life ==
ʻUtoikamanu is a graduate of the University of Auckland. She received her Bachelor of Commerce in Economics degree in 1980 and her Master of Commerce in Economics in 1983. She worked in Tonga's Ministry of Foreign Affairs, as Deputy Secretary of Foreign Affairs from 1991 to 2002, then as Secretary of Foreign Affairs from 2002 to 2005.

== Diplomatic career ==
On 15 February 2005, ʻUtoikamanu was appointed as Tonga's Permanent Representative to the United Nations. She continued in the role until late April 2009. While in New York, she also represented the Pacific Islands Forum. Her concomitant ambassadorial rank was that of Tonga's ambassador to the United States, Venezuela and Cuba, and High Commissioner to Canada, from May 26, 2005. As Tonga's representative at the United Nations, ʻUtoikamanu emphasised the need to address the issue of climate change.

In April 2009, she stepped down from her ambassadorial duties, both in the United Nations and the four countries above, and was appointed Deputy Director General of the Secretariat of the Pacific Community. While at the Pacific Community, she served as deputy pro-chancellor and deputy chair of council of the University of the South Pacific. In 2016 she was appointed chief executive of Tonga's Ministry of Tourism.

On 12 April 2017, she was appointed United Nations High Representative for the Least Developed Countries, Landlocked Developing Countries and Small Island Developing States. In April 2021 she was succeeded in the role by Earle Courtenay Rattray.

== Minister of Foreign Affairs ==
On 28 December 2021, she was appointed to the Cabinet of Siaosi Sovaleni as Minister of Foreign Affairs and Minister of Tourism. She was the only woman in Cabinet, and the only minister from outside the Legislative Assembly of Tonga.

On 2 February 2024, the king purported to revoke ʻUtoikamanu appointment as a minister, as well as prime minister Siaosi Sovaleni's position as armed forces minister. Attorney-General Linda Folaumoetu'i advised the Cabinet that the decision was unconstitutional.

On 4 April 2024, Prime Minister Sovaleni announced that she had resigned her cabinet portfolios, effective from 28 March.

== Honours ==
National honours

- Order of Queen Sālote Tupou III, Grand Cross (31 July 2008).

Political offices
Preceded by ʻAkosita Lavulavu	Minister of Tourism; 2021–2024	Succeeded by Viliami Latu
Preceded by Pōhiva Tuʻiʻonetoa	Minister of Foreign Affairs; 2021–2024	Succeeded by Siaosi Sovaleni as Acting minister
