= Lisiate ʻAkolo =

Tongan politician

Minister for Finance and National Planning
- In office 1 May 2012 – 9 January 2014
- Prime Minister: Lord Tuʻivakano
- Preceded by: Sunia Fili
- Succeeded by: ʻAisake Eke

Member of Parliament for Vavaʻu 14
- In office 26 November 2010 – 27 November 2014
- Preceded by: none (constituency established)
- Succeeded by: Saia Piukala

Lisiate ʻAloveita ʻAkolo is a Tongan politician, Member of the Legislative Assembly of Tonga and former Minister of Finance in the Tongan Cabinet.

Lisiate is a graduate of Victoria University of Wellington and American University. He worked for the Tonga Commodities Board and Tongan Development Bank, before becoming CEO of the South Pacific Tourism Organization in 2000.

In October 2006 he was appointed to the Cabinet as Minister for Labour, Commerce and Industries, under Prime Minister Feleti Sevele.

He stood in the 2010 election in the seat of Vavaʻu 14 and was successful. New Prime Minister Lord Tuʻivakanō retained him in Cabinet as Minister for Labour, Commerce and Industries. On September 1, 2011, he was reshuffled to the Ministry for Police, Prisons and Fire Services. On May 1, 2012, at his own request, he was reshuffled to the position of Minister of Finance.

He developed a reputation as a financial conservative who didn't want to see Tonga overwhelmed by debt repayments. He was also the lead Spokesperson for Pacific ACP States' negotiations with the European Union on a comprehensive Economic partnership agreement.

On 9 January 2014, ʻAkolo was fired from his position as Minister for Finance after publicly criticizing aspects of the budget. He was replaced by ʻAisake Eke.

== Honours ==
National honours

- Order of Queen Sālote Tupou III, Grand Cross (31 July 2008).
