= Religion in Tonga =

Religion in Tonga (2021 Census)
1. Free Wesleyan Church of Tonga (34.2%)
2. Church of Jesus Christ of Latter-Day Saints (19.6%)
3. Catholic Church (13.7%)
4. Free Church of Tonga (11.3%)
5. Church of Tonga (6.82%)
6. Other Christian (12.0%)
7. Baháʼí Faith (0.73%)
8. Other religions, no affiliation, or unstated (1.62%)

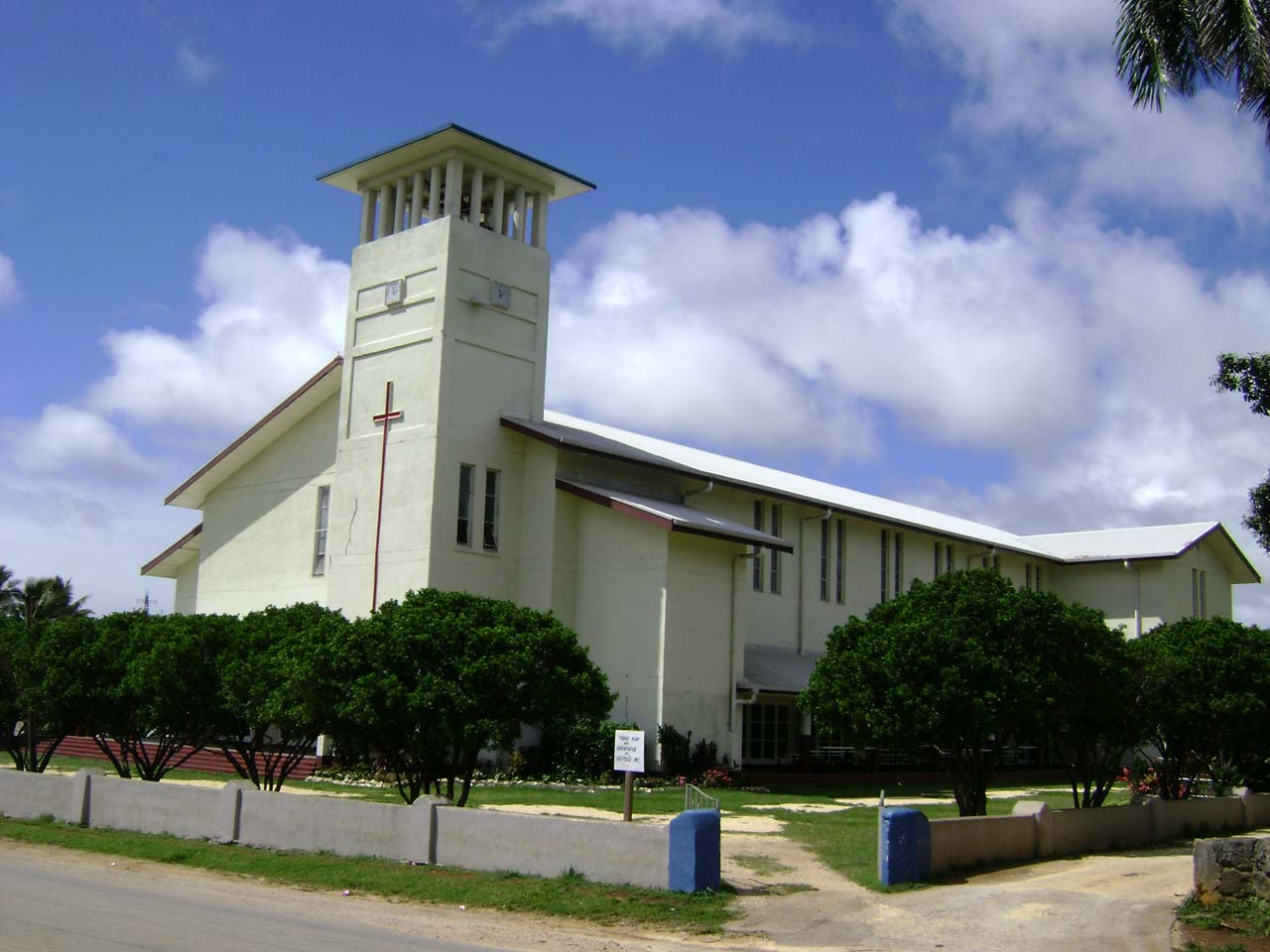
The Centenary Chapel (popularly called Saione, or Zion), located in Nuku'alofa. It is the national seat of the Free Wesleyan Church.

Catholic Basilica of Saint Anthony of Padua in Nuku'alofa

Christianity is the predominant religion in Tonga, with Free Wesleyan Church of Tonga having the most adherents.

The Constitution of Tonga establishes freedom of religion, which is respected in practice by both the government and general society, although there are some laws that restrict commerce and broadcast media in accordance with Christian religious norms.

== Christianity ==
Tongans are ardent churchgoers. Church service usually follows a call and response structure. Singing in the church is often done a cappella. Although a church attends primarily to the spiritual needs of the population, it also functions as the primary social hub.

Sunday is celebrated as a strict sabbath, enshrined so in the constitution, and despite some voices to the opposite, the Sunday ban is not likely to be abolished soon. No trade is allowed on Sunday, except essential services, after special approval by the minister of police. Those that break the law risk a fine or imprisonment.

Along with others from Oceania, some Tongan Christians have attempted to develop their own unique theology which addresses the contextual questions offered by people of the Pacific. This includes the coconut theology of the Methodist Sione 'Amanaki Havea or the incarnational theology of the Catholic Bishop of Tonga Patelesio Finau.

LDS Tonga Temple

The Church of Jesus Christ of Latter-day Saints in Tonga claims 68,609 members on record (about 60% of the population) with 175 congregations as of 2025. According to The Church of Jesus Christ of Latter-day Saints, Tonga has a higher per-capita number of Latter-day Saints than any other country in the world. However, according to the 2021 census, only 19.6% of Tongans belong to LDS Church and Tongans belonging to other Christian denominations represent the majority of the population.

== Other religions ==
Buddhism has begun to gain traction, growing from 0.2% to 0.4% of the population in five years. Hinduism decreased from 104 people in 2006 to 100 in 2011.

Islam is also present in Tonga, 0.2 percent of total population is Muslim.

There is a small population of Hindus in Tonga. The community doesn't have a temple and religious observances are typically done in private settings. According the 2021 Census there are 78 Hindus forming 0.1 percent of the country's population.

There is a small population of Muslims in Tonga, The 2021 census shows 60 Muslims forming 0.1% of the country's population. Other estimates also shows the population to be less than 100. As of 2010, the Ahmadiyya Muslim Community had approximately 50 members in the country, representing 0.5% of the population. The community is planning to raise funds to build a boarding school in Tongatapu with funding help from Saudi Arabia and Qatar.

The Baháʼí Faith in Tonga started after being set as a goal to introduce the religion in 1953, and Baháʼís arrived in 1954. With conversions and pioneers, the first Local Spiritual Assembly was elected in 1958. Less than forty years later, in 1996, the Baháʼís of Tonga established their paramount Baháʼí school in the form of the Ocean of Light International School. Around 2004 there were 29 local spiritual assemblies. The Tonga Broadcasting Commission maintained a policy that does not allow discussions by members of the Baháʼí Faith of its founder, Bahá'u'lláh on its radio broadcasts.

In the early 20th century, there were two early Sikh pioneers residing in Tonga who came from the Garhshankar tehsil of the Punjab.

== Demographics ==
According to the 2021 Tonga Census, the largest religious group in the country was the Free Wesleyan Church, comprising approximately 34.2% of the total population of 99,408. The Church of Jesus Christ of Latter-Day Saints followed with 19.6%, and Catholics made up 13.7%. The Free Church of Tonga accounted for 11.3%, while the Church of Tonga represented 6.8% of the population. Other notable denominations included the Seventh Day Adventist Church (2.48%), the Assembly of God (2.47%), and other Pentecostal denominations (1.92%). Tokaikolo adherents made up 1.46%, and the Constitutional Church of Tonga accounted for 1.16%. Smaller religious groups included the Baha’i Faith (0.73%), Mo’ui Fo’ou ‘ia Kalaisi (0.69%), the Anglican and Gospel churches (0.59 and 0.48%), Jehovah’s Witnesses (0.4%), and The Salvation Army (0.33%). Minority religions such as Hinduism and Islam comprised around 0.08% and 0.06% of the population, while Buddhists made up 0.06%. Additionally, 0.58% of the population reported no religious affiliation, 0.72% identified with other religions, and 0.12% refused to answer.

=== Census figures ===
Religions in Tonga by Census
Religion	1986	1996	2006	2011	2016	2021
Christianity	90,175	94,489	99,255	101,272	97,910	97,075
Baháʼí Faith	-	595	686	777	755	730
Hinduism	-	-	104	100	-	78
Buddhism	-	-	71	183	60	58
Islam	-	35	47	24	-	60
Other	2,874	830	202	877	921	714
Refuse to answer	-	10	1,698	275	104	119
None	-	61	28	288	516	574
Total	94,049	96,020	101,991	103,043	100,266	99,408

Christian groups in Tonga by Census
Religion	1986	1996	2006	2011	2016	2021
Free Wesleyan Church	40,371	39,703	38,052	36,592	35,082	33,953
Roman Catholic	14,921	15,309	15,922	15,441	14,276	13,649
Latter-day Saints	11,270	13,225	17,109	18,554	18,673	19,534
Free Church of Tonga	10,413	11,226	11,599	11,863	11,896	11,244
Church of Tonga	6,882	7,016	7,295	6,935	6,868	6,782
Tokaikolo Christian Church	3,047	2,919	2,597	2,533	1,562	1,455
Mo'ui Fo'ou 'ia Kalaisi	-	-	-	-	741	688
Anglican Church	563	720	765	728	697	590
Seventh-day Adventist Church	2,143	2,381	2,282	2,331	2,249	2,461
Assembly of God	565	1,082	2,350	2,602	2,347	2,455
Constitutional Church of Tonga	-	845	941	961	957	1,152
Gospel Church	-	63	243	236	287	476
The Salvation Army	-	-	-	247	297	332
Jehovah's Witnesses	-	-	-	462	385	400
Other Pentecostal Denomination	-	-	-	1,034	1,593	1,904
Total	90,175	94,489	99,255	101,272	97,910	97,075

== Religious freedom ==
The constitution of Tonga establishes the freedom of religion, with the qualification that this freedom is not used to "commit evil" or to otherwise violate the law. The constitution forbids commercial transactions on Sundays in accordance with the Christian Sabbath, although the tourism industry is granted some exceptions from this rule.

Religious organizations are not required to register with the government, but may do so to receive tax exemptions, the right to issue legally recognized marriage certificates, and other privileges. Foreign missionaries may operate in the country without special restrictions.

Public schools may choose to include up to an hour of religious education per week; students are required to attend religious education courses pertaining to the religion that they profess. Many religious organizations operate private schools.

The government allows religious organizations to broadcast programming on TV Tonga and Radio Tonga, officially with the restriction that they must limit their messaging to be "within the limits of the mainstream Christian tradition". Despite this restriction, in the past the Baháʼí Faith community has televised programming, although the community has since discontinued this program. As of 2020, there have been no reports of the government denying requests for airtime from any religious organization.

== See also ==
- The Church of Jesus Christ of Latter-day Saints in Tonga
- Hinduism in Tonga
- Islam in Tonga
- Tongan religion
