= Tuʻanuku =

Coordinates: 18°40′S 174°02′W

Tu'anuku is a village on the western part of Vava'u, Tonga. It has several nicknames such as Toa-ko-Tavakefai'ana, Halapukepuke, Hala-siki-'o-Mata'aho and also Uini-e-Ngofe. The population is 298.

There is a fresh water lake next to this village as well as one of Vava'u's two highest mountains, Mo'unga Lafa.

Tu'anuku has five churches: the Church of Tonga (Siasi 'o Tonga), the Free Church of Tonga (Siasi 'o Tonga Tau'atāina), the Free Wesleyan Church (Siasi Uesiliana Tau'atāina 'o Tonga), the Seventh Day Adventist Church (Siasi 'Aho Fitu), and the Church of Jesus Christ of Latter-day Saints (Siasi 'o Sīsū Kalaisi 'o e Kau Mā'oni'oni he Ngaahi 'Aho ki mui). It also has a primary school, G.P.S. Tu'anuku, which runs from Class 1 through Class 6. Older students are bussed to Neiafu for their secondary school education.

Tu'anuku is an estate of the chief, Finau 'Ulukalala. Their current town officer is 'Amanakilelei Funaki.
