= Baháʼí Faith in Tonga =

The Baháʼí Faith in Tonga started after being set as a goal to introduce the religion in 1953, and Baháʼís arrived in 1954. With conversions and pioneers the first Baháʼí Local Spiritual Assembly was elected in 1958. From 1959 the Baháʼís of Tonga and their local institutions were members of a Regional Spiritual Assembly of the South Pacific. By 1963 there were five local assemblies. Less than forty years later, in 1996, the Baháʼís of Tonga established their paramount Baháʼí school in the form of the Ocean of Light International School. Around 2004 there were 29 local spiritual assemblies. The 2015 estimate of the World Religion Database ranked the Baháʼís at 3.5% of the national population, though as recently as 2006 the Tonga Broadcasting Commission maintained a policy that does not allow discussions by members of the Baháʼí Faith of its founder, Baháʼu'lláh on its radio broadcasts.

== Early days ==
In 1953 the twelve existing Baháʼí National Spiritual Assemblies were asked by Shoghi Effendi, then head of the religion, to help spread the religion. The community of the United States was to attempt to bring the religion to Tonga. In Tonga, the Baháʼí community grew much like it did in other Pacific communities — first the community emerged through the acts of both pioneers and converts and then grew by spreading through family and tribal groups or clan-structures.

Australian Stanley P. Bolton was the first Baháʼí to arrive in Tonga — he arrived on 25 January 1954. American Dudley M. Blakely, nephew of Lua Getsinger, and wife Elsa also pioneered to Tonga on 12 July 1954. Each earned the title Knights of Baháʼu'lláh for their service to the religion. Blakely was a designer and worked as an adviser to the Tongan government contributing to a number of buildings and furnishings as well as stamps and coins for the government. In 1961 he had designed a five-stamp special issue set commemorating mail deliveries to the islands changing from the era of the fishing boat to airmail. In 1962 he designed a set of the first gold coins in Polynesia. He designed Tonga's first decimal coin set in 1965.

By 1956 there were indigenous Baháʼí converts on the islands; three individuals who converted to the religion were prominent in Tongan society: Mosese Hokafonu, Lisiata Mak, and Suliana Halaholo. Mosese Hokafonu, who lived on the island of Tongatapu, converted to the Baháʼí Faith in the early 1950s. For many years Hokafonu served on the Baháʼí Local Spiritual Assembly of Nuku'alofa and donated a significant portion of the land for the site of the national Baháʼí Center. Hokafonu joined Gina and Russell Garcia on board their boat the Dawnbreaker for an extensive trip which took them through the islands of Fiji, Tonga and Samoa. Hokafonu was the first Pacific Islander to undertake missionary trips of long duration — including Kiribati and Tuvalu; Niue; the Solomon Islands; New Guinea; the Marshall, Mariana and Caroline Islands; Nauru; Australia and New Zealand (especially among the Māori), Hawaii, Alaska and the continental United States. Baron Vaea, a Tongan noble and former Prime Minister, a relative of Hokafonu, conducted the funeral service which was attended by many hundreds of people.

Lisiata Maka, a legal adviser in Tonga's lower and supreme courts, became a Baháʼí in 1957 and was elected to the Regional National Assembly, and was later appointed to the Continental Board of Counsellors. Suliana Halaholo was born in Tonga in 1950 and began attending a Baháʼí school's children's classes at the age of eight. Soon she was teaching classes and began being involved in administrative activities while she was still a youth. She was secretary of the youth committee of Tonga, and later of Fiji, and thanks to her academic achievements the government of Tonga gave her a scholarship to study dietetics at the University of the South Pacific in Suva, Fiji, where she obtained her bachelor's degree. Halalholo devoted two of her vacations from schooling to translating into the Tongan language The Seven Valleys (one of Baháʼu'lláh's metaphysical works), and later the Tablet Words of Wisdom. Both translations were approved by the National Spiritual Assembly of Tonga.

== Growth ==
The first Local Spiritual Assembly of Tonga was of Nuku'alofa in 1958, and by 1963 there were Baháʼí Local Spiritual Assemblies in Houma, Kolonga, Mu'a, Nuku'alofa, Vaini, and smaller Baháʼí groups in Folaha, Tokomolo, Vaotu'u and isolated Baháʼís in Felemea and several villages on the island of Haʻapai - Kotu', Lotofoa, Na'ufanga, Nomuka and Ohonua Eua.

Tonga developed international administrative relationships in tandem with its internal growth. Mr. Latu Tu 'Akihekolo represented Tongan Baháʼís to an Baháʼí International Conference in Japan in 1958. Tonga was allocated delegates for the election of the regional Spiritual Assembly of the South Pacific from 1959 to 1963. Eventually Tonga and the Cook Islands alone shared a regional National Assembly starting in 1970 and the Cook Islands Baháʼí community formed their own National Assembly in 1985.

Baháʼí pioneers continued to make their presence felt in Tonga whether their stay was short or long. Margaret Rowling was almost constantly traveling to Samoa, Tonga, Tahiti, New Caledonia, Nouméa and the Cook Islands between 1956 and 1975. During 1974-79 Australian pioneers embarked to many of the Pacific islands including Tonga. Tongan Baháʼís have also traveled to other lands; in addition to the travelers and travels mentioned above there have also been two exchange students from Tonga attended the Daystar International School, the first development project of the National Spiritual Assembly of Japan.

In 2004, during the golden jubilee of the Baháʼí community of Tonga, there were 29 local spiritual assemblies and the community has had visits over the years from prominent Baha'is — Hands of the Cause Collis Featherstone, Abu'l-Qasim Faizi, Rahmatu'lláh Muhájir, Enoch Olinga, Rúhíyyih Khanum, and John Robarts, and a member of the Universal House of Justice, Hugh Chance.

Celebrations held for the golden anniversary of the Baháʼí Faith in Tonga included the attendance of then Crown Prince Tupouto'a, Native American artist Kevin Locke as well as choirs, dance troops, tribal story tellers and hundreds of participants. The brother of then Crown Prince Topouto'a, the Honoroble Ma'atu, died on 17 February 2004 after suffering a heart attack. Representatives of the Baháʼí community accepted an invitation to offer prayers at the memorial service held on 24 February and was survived by his wife Alaileula, the granddaughter of the late Malietoa Tanumafili II, former Head of State of Samoa, also a member of the Baháʼí Faith.

=== Opposition in Tonga ===
While the Baháʼí community has grown in the country, there has also been opposition. In 1973, the Wesleyan Church of Niua Toputapu published an anti-Baháʼí polemic "The Baha'i Faith Answered by Christianity".

Furthermore, even as late as 2008 the Tonga Broadcasting Commission (TBC) maintains policy guidelines regarding the broadcast of religious programming on Radio Tonga. The TBC guidelines state that in view of "the character of the listening public" those who preach on Radio Tonga must confine their preaching "within the limits of the mainstream Christian tradition." Due to this policy, the TBC does not allow discussions by members of the Baháʼí Faith of its founder, Baháʼu'lláh, by name, or of the tenets of their religions. Members of the Baháʼí Faith utilize a privately owned radio station for program activities and the announcement of functions.

== Demographics ==
In 1983, Baháʼí sources claimed they constituted 3.9% of the national population and by 1987 the number of Baháʼís was at 6.3%. Through 2000-2006 estimates ranged between nearly 5% or 6.09%. In 2007 Encyclopedia Encarta estimated the Baháʼí community constituted 7% of the national population, (about 8100 individuals) — more than twice the size of the remaining non-Christian religious groups in Tonga. The World Religion Database estimated 3.5% of the national population in 2015 were Baháʼís. However the national census listed its official population in the upper hundreds: 595 in 1986, 686 in 2006, and 777 in 2011.

== Multiplying involvements ==
Since its inception the religion has had involvement in socio-economic development beginning by giving greater freedom to women, promulgating the promotion of female education as a priority concern, and that involvement was given practical expression by creating schools, agricultural coops, and clinics. The religion entered a new phase of activity when a message of the Universal House of Justice dated 20 October 1983 was released. Baháʼís were urged to seek out ways, compatible with the Baháʼí teachings, in which they could become involved in the social and economic development of the communities in which they lived. Worldwide in 1979 there were 129 officially recognized Baháʼí socio-economic development projects. By 1987, the number of officially recognized development projects had increased to 1482. The Baháʼí community in Tonga has organized various institutions and events in the country. The Ocean of Light International School is a private internationalist Baháʼí school directly administered by a non-profit Board of Education nominated by the National Spiritual Assembly of the Baháʼís of Tonga. The school is known as a Baháʼí school and is striving to incorporate Baháʼí ideals, principles and concepts into the curriculum and organization of the school. The school is located in Kolomotuʻa / Hofoa - about 3 kilometers from the centre of Nukuʻalofa. It offers classes from kindergarten (3 years old) to high school diploma using Cambridge International Examinations including the International General Certificate of Secondary Education. There are Baháʼí youth performing periods of service at the school. Furthermore, Nancy Watters, a consultant promoting virtue oriented programs especially for schools toured Tonga in 2002. See also The Virtues Project.

In October 2007, ʻIlifeleti Tovo of Kolomotuʻa was elected President of the University of the South Pacific Students Association (USPSA) despite not being affiliated with a political party. The Baháʼí Faith does not condone party affiliations and Tovo resigned his party affiliation "...because I did not want to break my religious rules and ethics". In 2008, Tovo strongly criticized the salary range of University officers and was censured but salaries were adjusted downward by 45-65%.

There also exists the 1844 Rock band composed of Tongan Baháʼís whose style is religious rock.

== See also ==
- History of Tonga
- Religion in Tonga
- Baháʼí Faith in Samoa
