= Tongan religion =

Native precontact beliefs of Tonga

Though it is no longer practised today, Tonga's ancient religion was practised for over 2,000 years, and some authors have characterised pre-contact Tonga as a theocracy. Christian missionaries arrived from the 1790s; they persuaded King George Tupou I to convert (1831) to Christianity. He ordered and strictly enforced that all Tongans become Christian and no longer practise the ancient polytheistic religion with its supreme god Tangaloa.

== Pūlotū ==
Pulotu was the unseen world, the domain of the god or goddess Hikule'o believed to be reached by sea. Stories told of journeys to Pulotu. Tongans identify Pulotu with the underworld, Lolofonua. Pulotu is also identified with the cemetery or graveyard. Long ago, it was believed that Pulotu could be visited by a man to recover a dead wife. Hikule'o would assemble the spirits so the wife could be found, reanimated and released.

Two entrances are pointed out by Tongans. One is Ahole a deep hole on the island of Koloa, Vava'u. Ahole was the opening from which Maui Kisikisi brought fire from the underworld to this world. The second opening was through the island of Tofua. There are three divisions of Pulotu called Pulotu Tete, Pulotu 'Aka'aka, and Pulotu Tu'uma'u.

== Gods and deities ==
=== Tangaloa ===
Tangaloa, the sky god (or grouped together as sky gods), was regarded in Vava'u as the deity who hauled up the islands of the Vava'u group, his fish hook (This is also similar to the story of Maui fishing up the North Island of New Zealand) catching in what is now the island of Hunga. The Vava'u people attributed this great act to Tangaloa instead of Maui due to the importance of Tangaloa worship in Vava'u. Tangaloa Tufunga, though said not to be a god in Niuatoputapu, is the patron of carpenters elsewhere in Tonga.

=== Maui ===
The Maui were special men or demigods; they appeared human. Maui drew up the islands of Atata, north of Tongatapu, as well as Tongatapu with all its associated islands, then Lofanga and the other Ha'apai islands, and lastly the Vava'u.

== See also ==
- Religion in Tonga
