= Islam in Tonga =

Tonga is an overwhelmingly Christian majority country, with adherents of Islam being a minority. Due to secular nature of the Tonga's constitution, Muslims are free to proselytize and build places of worship in the country. Most Muslims in Tonga belong to either Sunni or Ahmadiyya denominations. The number of Muslims was estimated at less than 1000 in 2010 by the Pew Research Center in a population of about 108,000, while a report by the Fiji Muslim League estimated that in 2002 there were about 70 Muslim Tongan nationals out of a Muslim population of 100.

== Muslim school ==
Tonga’s Muslim community is planning to raise funds in the Middle East to build a new boarding school on Tongatapu. The school is to follow the Tongan school curriculum, but additionally offer the Arabic language and Islamic studies as options. Sheikh Imam Abdul Fader, a spiritual leader of the Tongan Muslim community and a mathematics teacher, said their project is to build a three-story boarding school that will serve Muslims and non-Muslims, especially orphans who are often deprived of education. The children in the school will not be forced to study or convert to Islam. He also said that a small delegation of Tongan Muslims will leave in June 2007 for Saudi Arabia and Qatar to seek donations and funding for the new school, since these two countries are well known for their strong contributions to the Muslim community in Australia and New Zealand.

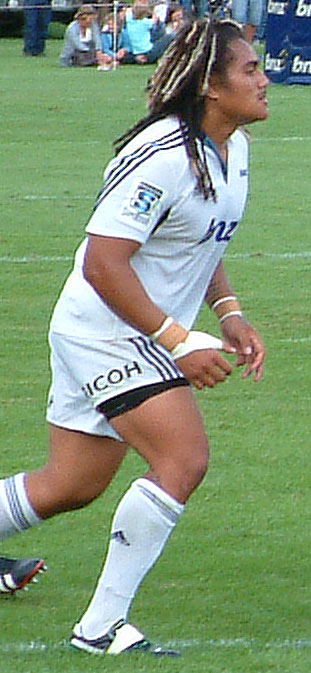
Ofa Tu'ungafasi is a Tongan born All Black Rugby Union player.

== Mosques ==
- Al-Khadeejah Mosque

== Notable Muslims ==
- Ofa Tu'ungafasi

== See also ==
- Islam by country
- Religion in Tonga
- Islam in Oceania
