= Al-Khadeejah Mosque =

Mosque in Nukuʻalofa, Tongatapu, Tonga

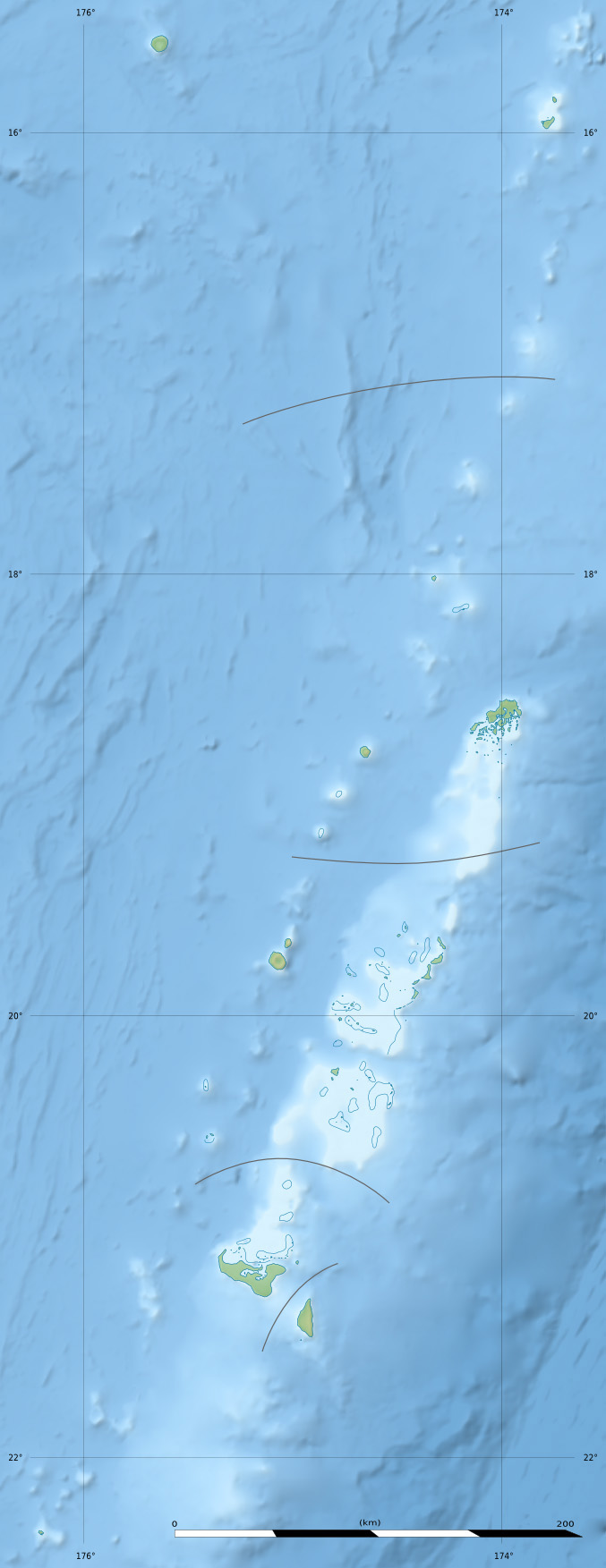
- Location within Tonga

Religion
- Affiliation: Islam

Location
- Location: Nukuʻalofa, Tongatapu, Tonga
- Interactive map of Al-Khadeejah Mosque
- Coordinates: 21°07′54.5″S 175°12′28.4″W

Architecture
- Type: mosque
- Established: 2010

The Al-Khadeejah Mosque is a mosque in Nukuʻalofa, Tongatapu, Tonga.

== History ==
The mosque was established in 2010 with funds from foreign donors. In 2018, the mosque was damaged by the Cyclone Gita.

== See also ==
- Islam in Tonga
