= Ocean of Light International School =

Private school in Tonga

Coordinates: 21°8′21″S 175°13′53″W

Information
- School type: Private international Baháʼí school
- Religious affiliation: Baháʼí Faith
- Established: 1996; 30 years ago
- Age: 3 to 18

The Ocean of Light International School, located in Tonga, is a private international Baháʼí school dedicated to the development of the spiritual, intellectual, and physical potential of the students and to the fostering of a new world society identifying itself with the principles of a world citizenship, a universal value system, a world embracing administrative, economic, social and educational systems based on the concept of unity in diversity, established in 1996. To achieve this the School aims to develop in the students those capacities, skills, habits and attitudes necessary to enable them to provide for their families; to effectively contribute to the peace, prosperity and tranquillity of mankind and society; and to participate in the creation of new institutions, processes and relationships as they are defined and established.

The School is directly administered by a non-profit Board of Education nominated by the National Spiritual Assembly of the Baha'is of Tonga. The school is known as a Bahaʼi school and is striving to incorporate Bahaʼi ideals, principles and concepts into the curriculum and organization of the school. The school is located in Kolomotuʻa / Hofoa - about 3 kilometers from the centre of Nukuʻalofa. It offers classes from kindergarten (3 years old) to high school diploma using Cambridge International Examinations including the International General Certificate of Secondary Education.

The school is listed by the Department of Defence (Australia) as a Primary and Secondary "Benchmark school" for those posted to Tonga.

== Events ==
- Crown Prince Tupoutoa of Tonga cut the ribbon to open the new buildings at the school.
- 2006 Prime Minister of the Kingdom of Tonga, the Honorable Dr. Fred Sevele praised the Ocean of Light School for its educational philosophy of academics and spiritual virtues at the school's 10th anniversary celebration.
