= Free Church of Tonga =

Christian denomination in Nuku'alofa, Tonga

Coordinates: 21°08′07″S 175°12′10″W

Centennial Church in Nuku'alofa

Centennial Church in Nuku'alofa

The Free Church of Tonga (Tongan: Siasi ʻo Tonga Tauʻatāina) is a Christian denomination of Methodist extraction in the Kingdom of Tonga. The Church was established in 1885 by King George Tupou I and his government at Lifuka, Ha'apai, as a nationalist reaction to attempts at colonising the Friendly Isles (as Tonga was known at the time). In 1924, its membership was enlarged by the admittance of the entirety of the Wesleyan Church of Tonga, whose district synod voted to reconcile with the Free Church. This union was rejected by the former President, Jabez B. Watkin, and a minority who continued under the old banner long after the united Church had reverted to its original name, the Free Wesleyan Church of Tonga. The Free Church name is now synonymous with the group that repudiated the church union of 1924.

== History ==
=== Origins ===
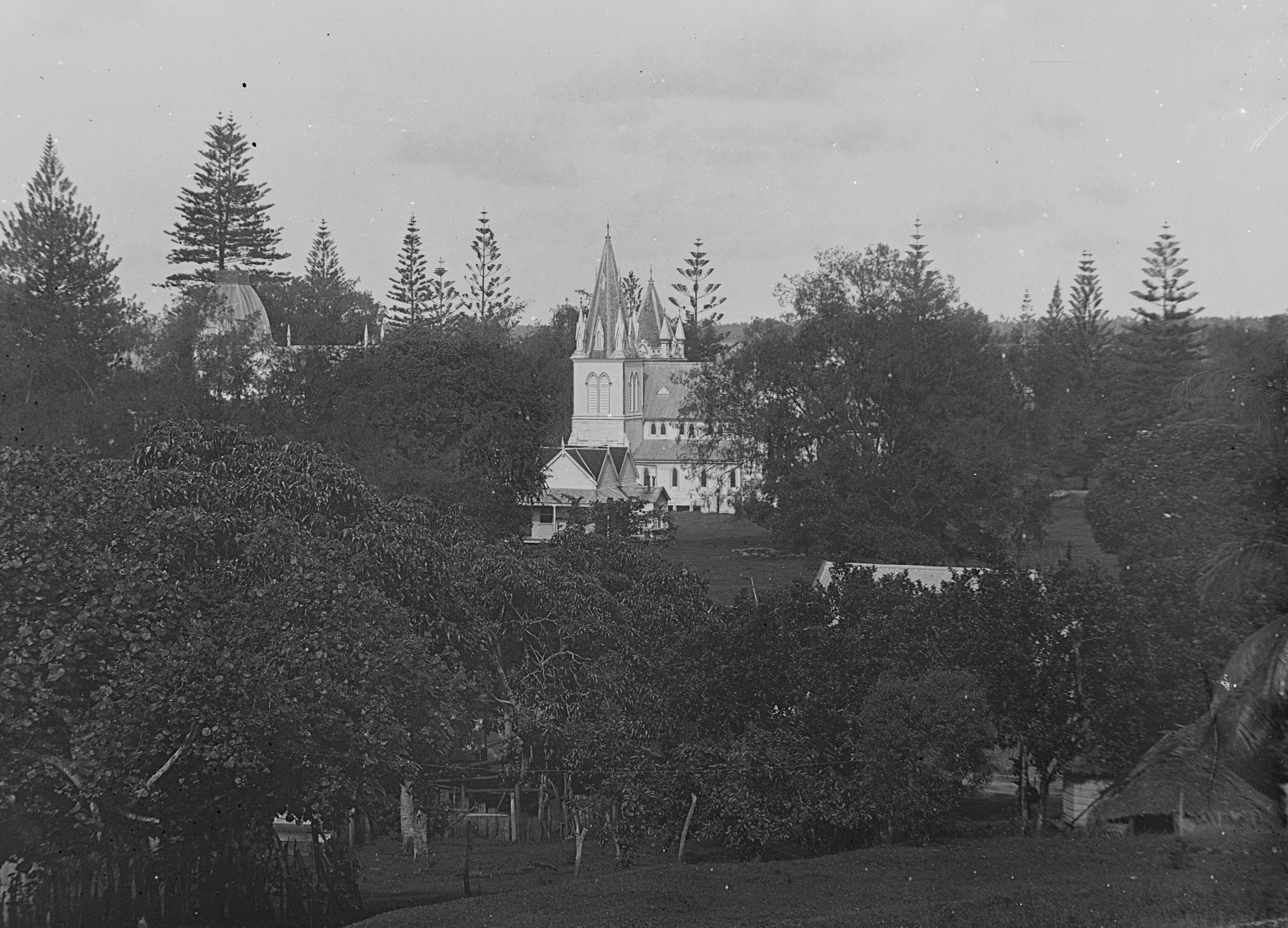
The original "King's Chapel" of the Free Church of Tonga, seen in 1911

The Church was established in January 1885 by Tupou I at the behest of his chief advisor, Shirley Baker, with its goal being independence from the Wesleyan Methodist Church in Australia and the missionaries, enabling the Tongan Wesleyan Church to administer its own affairs. Originally called the ' Wesleyan Free Church of Tonga' (old Tongan orthography: Koe Jiaji Ueseliana Tauataina o Toga), it became the official state church under George Tupou II, who renamed it the 'Church of Free Tonga' (old Tongan orthography: Koe Jiaji o Toga Tauataina) in 1898, though it remained known as the Free Church worldwide. Jabez B. Watkin, then-Superintendent of Ha'apai and the son of early British Methodist missionary to Tonga and New Zealand, James Watkin, was appointed by George Tupou I as President of the Free Church of Tonga in 1885, and remained so for nearly forty years.

=== Reunion with the Wesleyans ===
Queen Salote Tupou III and her son King Taufa'ahau Tupou IV were both christened in the Free Church, which reinforced its identity as part of the Tongan establishment, as opposed to the unpopular minority of Wesleyan Methodists that still clung to the old relationship with the Australian Church. In 1924, Queen Sālote, who was married to Prince Consort Uiliami Tungī Mailefihi (a Wesleyan Methodist), successfully pushed for a reunion of the Free Church and the Wesleyan remnant. In May of that year, the Church's Annual General Conference was convened by command of the Queen at the Royal Chapel in Nuku'alofa, where she handed Watkin his letter of dismissal. The former president then walked out of the meeting along with 27 other loyal ministers (which was about a fifth of the Free Church clergy), among whom was the Reverend Paula Fonua, and around a sixth of the Church's membership. In his stead, Setaleki Manu (a notable Free Church missionary to Samoa), was appointed to the Presidency.

On 16 May, while the conference was still in session, a procession of Wesleyan ministers (who had unanimously voted in their District Synod to reconcile with the Free Church on the previous day) entered the chapel and joined in their deliberations, a symbol of their resolve to finally restore unity to the Methodist Church in Tonga. A moving conclusion to the General Conference was its united thanksgiving evensong, where key figures from both churches stood up to deliver their apologies for past hostilities and to offer forgiveness for all personal and public slights. The united Conference also passed a resolution to restore the Church's original name, which George Tupou II had amended in 1898.

=== The Continuing Free Church of Tonga ===
Following the reunion, Watkin and his followers sought judicial intervention against the newly united Free Wesleyan Church of Tonga. A series of hearings in the Tongan High Court concerning church properties and assets further embittered the relationship between the united church and the schismatics until 1926, when an appeal to the Privy Council culminated on a ruling in favour of the united Church body. This left all properties and assets to the Free Wesleyan Church of Tonga as the legal successor of the original Free Church.

Watkin died in 1925, one year before the Privy Council's decisive ruling, and with the loss of all material ties to the old Church by 1926, his colleagues resolved to put their past allegiances to mainline Methodism behind them. Having found an ideal presidential successor in Robert Gordon-Kirgan, a retired Presbyterian minister from New Zealand, the continuing Free Church ratified necessary amendments to its original constitution that facilitated its decision to strike out anew as the Siasi 'o Tonga Tau'atāina, no longer affiliated with the Free Wesleyan Church, the Australian Methodist Church or any of their associates.

Gordon-Kirgan's attempts to reform the continuing Free Church caused uproar among the denomination's chiefly class, especially annoying the nobleman Lord Fīnau 'Ulukālala of Tu'anuku, Vava'u, who defected with a group of sympathetic ministers to form the Church of Tonga (old Tongan orthography: Koe Jiaji o Toga) in 1928. Eventually falling out with the membership of the Free Church, Gordon-Kirgan retired to New Zealand, being replaced by the aforementioned Paula Fonua, with whose descendants the presidency has since remained. Fonua's great-grandson, the Reverend Semisi Fonua, is the incumbent President of the Free Church of Tonga, succeeding his father, grandfather and great-grandfather before him.

To date, the continuing Free Church of Tonga has districts and congregations both at home and abroad, including countries like New Zealand, Australia, USA, Fiji and American Samoa. The Church has an administration centre at the outskirt of Tonga Central Business District.

== Education ==
The Church operates three high schools, one each in Tongatapu, Haʻapai and Vavaʻu, all named Tailulu College, which were established during Rev. Sione Fonua's administration. The Church also operates two pre-schools in Auckland, New Zealand: Falemasiva and Lou'olive. About 20% of its funds are spent on education.
