= Church of Tonga =

Church building in Nuku'alofa, Tonga

Coordinates: 21°8′19″S 175°12′4″W

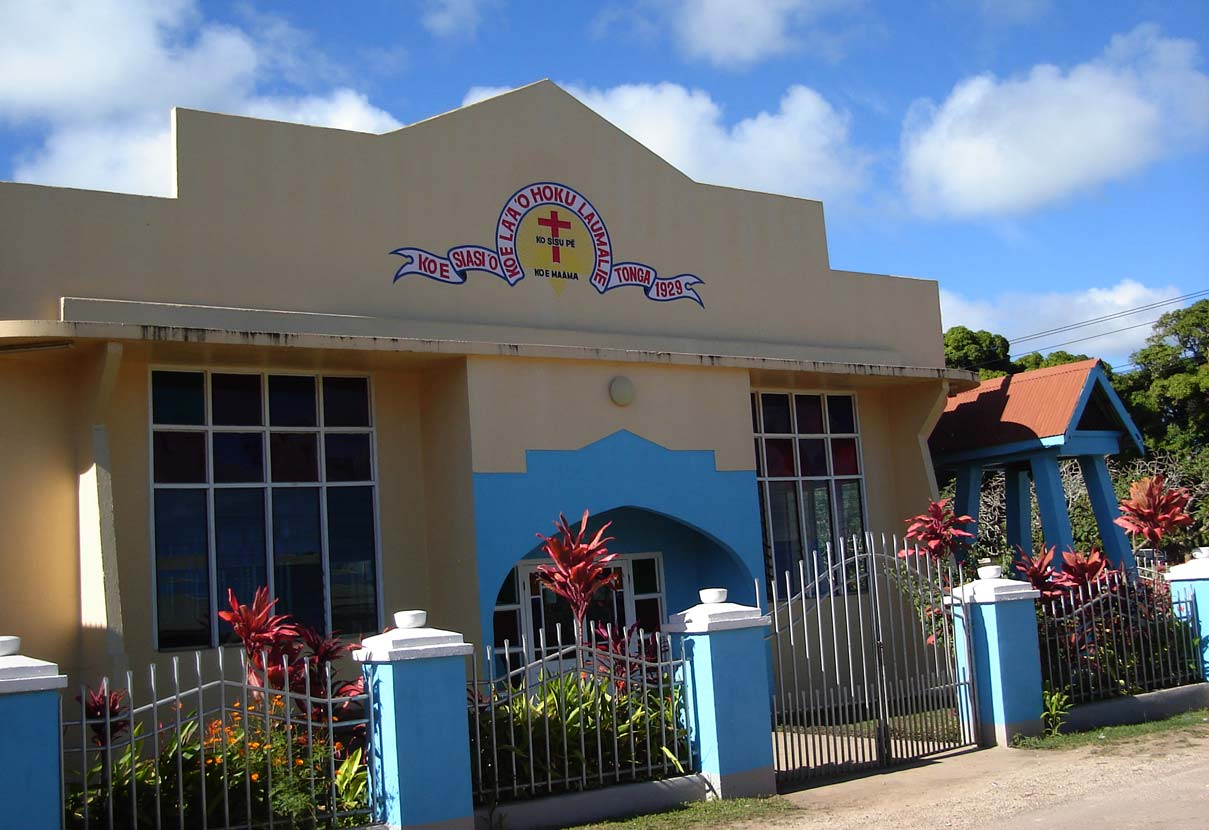

The Church of Tonga (Siasi ʻo Tonga) is a Christian Protestant denomination founded in, and primarily active in, Tonga. It is headquartered in the capital Nukuʻalofa.

It was established in 1929 by those members who did not agree to the 1924 unification of the Wesleyan mission and the Free church into the Free Wesleyan Church of Tonga. They also did not agree with the schism of 1929 when the Free Church of Tonga broke away. They also broke away and were fully established the year after, 1929.

To avoid confusion with the Free Church of Tonga, this church is colloquially known as the Church of the Lords. After the death of Siaosi Fīnau Mīsini in 1938, his son, Siaosi Tangata ʻo Haʻamea, became the next president, until his death in 1960. Remarkably, despite Vavaʻu being the estate of ʻUlukālala, the Church of Tonga is very small there.

The current leader of the church is Reverend Dr. Tu'ipulotu Lofitu Katoanga, who has been President of the Church since 2012, replacing Reverend Dr. Tevita Feke Mafi. Dr. Katoanga was the former principal of Tonga College. He retired from the government's Ministry of Education to take up this post prior to his presidency, which later became the Secretary General of the Church while Dr. Mafi was president. He is also a son of a former president of the church, the Late Reverend Finau Katoanga. The current Secretary General of the Church is Reverend Mosese Ueleni.
