= Radio Tonga =

Radio station in Tonga

Coordinates: 21°08′24.7″S 175°11′33.3″W

Radio Tonga (A3Z)
- Tonga
- Frequencies: 1017 kHz AM, 90.0 MHz FM, 103.0 MHz FM

Programming
- Format: Music, news, sport, weather

Ownership
- Owner: Tonga Broadcasting Commission

History
- First air date: 4 July 1961; 65 years ago

Radio Tonga (also known by the call sign A3Z) is Tonga's main commercial radio station, founded in 1961 by Queen Salote Tupou III, and operating as a service of the Tonga Broadcasting Commission (TBC). Its slogan is "The Call of the Friendly Islands". Radio Tonga currently broadcasts services on three separate frequencies.

== Radio Tonga 1 ==
The most far-reaching of all Radio Tonga's services, this station broadcasts daily from 6 a.m. to midnight, on a frequency of 1017 kHz. This is the only service of TBC that has been in operation since TBC's inception in 1961; its test broadcasts started on 13 March, while the official opening was on July 4. It features local, Pacific & international news, as well as Tongan music, and overseas retro music, mostly from the 1970s & 1980s. Several local church organisations and businesses have weekly programs, and, though it is government-owned and funded, a significant source of its profit relies on in-house commercial advertising. In the event of local emergencies, such as tropical cyclones, Radio Tonga has been known to stay on the air all night with constant cyclone updates from the Tonga Meteorological Service. Radio Tonga 1 can be heard throughout the entire Kingdom of Tonga, including the outer island groups of Ha'apai, Vava'u, Niuafo'ou & Niuatoputapu, although there have been reports of listeners receiving the signal in other countries, such as Samoa and Finland. The station broadcasts with a power output of 10,000 Watts into a omnidirectional antenna.

== Radio Tonga 2 - Kool 90FM ==
Formerly known as FM97, now broadcasting on a frequency of 90.0 MHz, this commercial FM station commenced in the early 1990s, and now runs 24 hours a day, playing mostly chart-toppers from abroad. After the local broadcast ends at midnight, BBC programming is relayed live via satellite until the local broadcast resumes at 6 a.m. This service can only be heard on the main island of Tongatapu, and its closely surrounding islands such as 'Eua, Pangaimotu and Atata. The station broadcasts with 500 watts.

== 103FM ==
Launched on 21 November 2005, this FM service—broadcast on 103.0 MHz—relays Radio Australia 24 hours a day, and is only available to listeners in Tongatapu and 'Eua.
