= Free Wesleyan Church of Tonga =

Largest Christian denomination in Tonga

- Siasi Uēsiliana Tau'atāina 'o Tonga
- FWCT logo Motto: "Ko e me'a tēpū ko e 'iate kitautolu 'a e 'Otua" (The best of all is that God is with us).
- Classification: Protestant
- Orientation: Methodist
- Theology: Wesleyan, Evangelical
- Polity: Connexionalism
- President: Dr. Tevita Koloa'ia Havea
- Secretary-General: Rev. Mr. Alifeleti Atiola
- Headquarters: Nuku'alofa, Tonga
- Territory: Tonga, Fiji, American Samoa, Aotearoa/New Zealand, Australia, Japan, United States of America.
- Origin: 30 May 1924.
- Merger of: Free Church of Tonga and Methodist Church of Australasia
- Other name: Methodist Church of Tonga
- Official website: www.fwc.to

The Free Wesleyan Church of Tonga (FWCT; Tongan: Siasi Uēsiliana Tau‘atāina ‘o Tonga) is a Methodist denomination in Tonga. It is the largest Christian denomination in the nation and has close ties with the Monarch. It has its roots in the arrival of the first missionaries from the London Missionary Society and the ministry of the Wesleyan Methodist Mission Society, the latter of which cemented its Methodist identity.

The Tongan Royal Family has had a close relationship with the denomination since the arrival of Christianity on the island, and many of them have been prominent members; thus, with these factors, the FWCT can be considered a de facto state church.

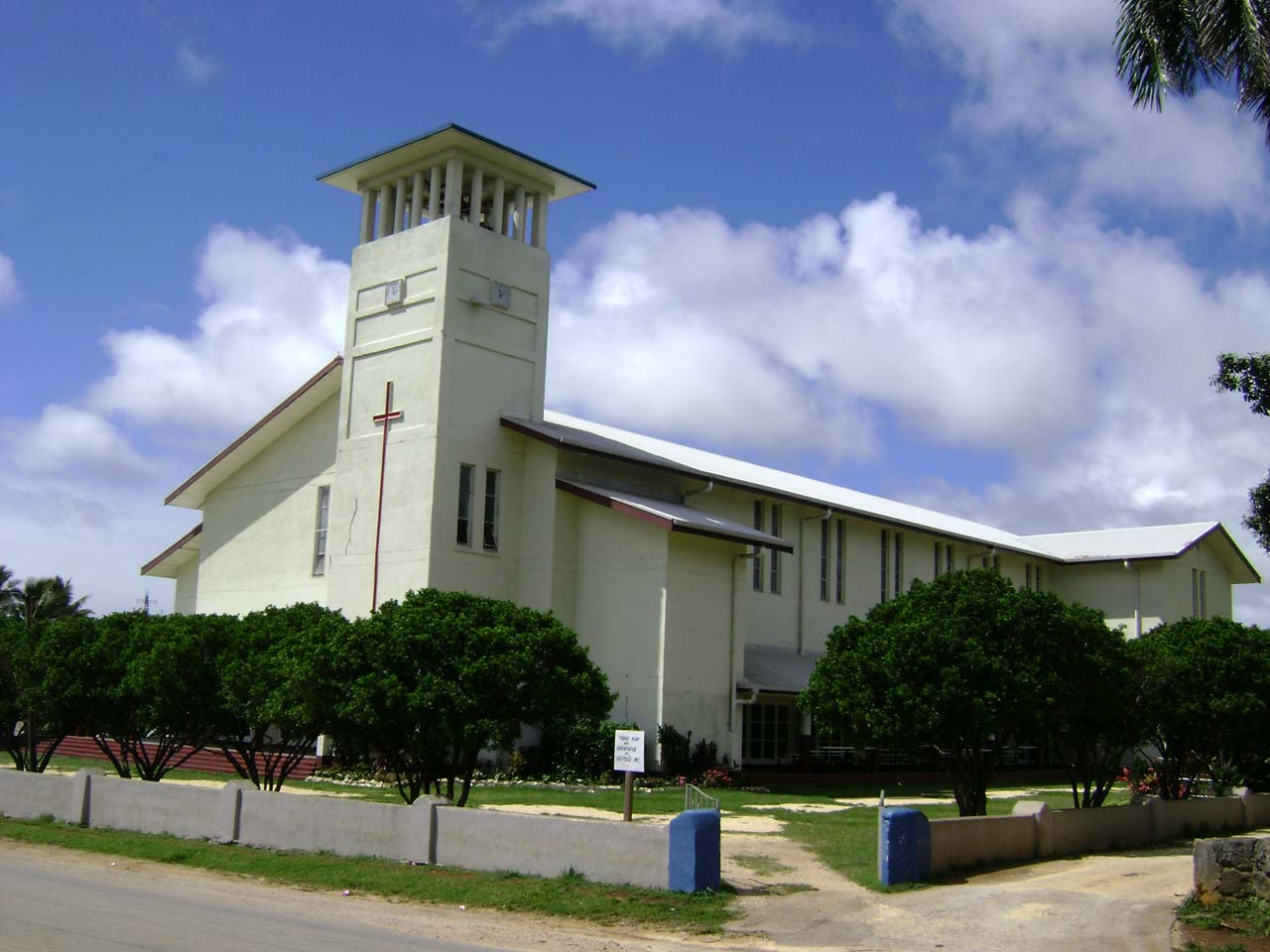
The Centenary Chapel (known as Saione or Zion), in the district of Kolomotu'a, Nuku'alofa. The seat of the Free Wesleyan Church, it was built to commemorate the centenary of Christianity in Tonga.

== History ==
=== Origins ===
The Free Wesleyan Church of Tonga came about as the product of the Union between the Established Free Church of Tonga and the minority Wesleyan Church, which was still in Full Connexion with the Methodist Church of Australasia. Prior to the reforms of George Tupou II in 1898, the Established Church was known as the 'Wesleyan Free Church' or 'Free Wesleyan Church of Tonga' (old Tongan orthography: Koe Jiaji Ueseliana Tauataina o Toga)

In 1924, Queen Sālote Tupou III successfully spearheaded the attempt to unite the Free Church, founded by her great-great-grandfather George Tupou I, with the Wesleyan Methodist Church (pejoratively dubbed by Free Churchmen as the Siasi Fakaongo, or Church of the 'Subservient ones'). The relationship between the two denominations was tense as there were many still living who had been party to the crisis of 1885–1887.

=== The Great Wesleyan Schism & Crisis of 1885-1887 ===
The crisis had started in January, 1885, when Tupou I and his advisors - most especially the former Wesleyan missionary and then-Premier, Shirley Waldemar Baker ('Misa Peka'), who played a prominent role- in their pursuit of total independence from foreign missionary intervention, initiated schism from the Wesleyan Methodist Conference of New South Wales and demanded that indigenous Tongans show fealty to their King by abandoning the Wesleyan Church for the newly seceded Free Church of Tonga. This prompted severe persecution against the remaining Wesleyans from agents of both the Tongan Government and the Tongan Free Church, a reaction that inspired James Egan Moulton’s (Tōketā Moulitoni) composition and translation of the poignant Wesleyan hymns that have become a central feature of contemporary ecumenism throughout the nation.

=== The Move Towards Union ===
A slight mellowing of denominational rivalry and sectarianism by 1908 was noted by the missionary-Bishop of the local Anglican community, the Right Reverend Alfred Willis ('Misa Uilisi'), who joined the Wesleyan Chairman and Free Church President, the Reverends Rodger Page ('Misa Peesi') and Jabez B. Watkin ('Misa Uatekini') respectively, in a united petition against governmental corruption in Tonga.

Despite opposition from some members of the Free Church, the reunion of the two Churches eventually gained traction and was finalised by the General Conference of 1924, when a Free Church minister and former missionary, the Reverend Setaleki Manu, was appointed as the first president of the newly reunited Free Wesleyan Church. Nevertheless, a minority headed by the former president, Jabez Watkin, rejected the union, forming the Siasi 'o Tonga Tau'atāina or 'Church of Free Tonga', which had been the legal name of the Free Church since the royal reforms of 1898.

Watkin had, at the last minute, reneged on his mutual pact with the Queen and the Wesleyan authorities to reunite the Churches, prompting Queen Sālote to dismiss him from his office on the first day of the General Conference meeting in 1924. The former president and 27 other presbyters who remained loyal to him walked out of the General Conference session, taking with them about a sixth of the original Free Church membership.

=== Separation of the Continuing Free Church ===
The Siasi 'o Tonga Tau'atāina (STT) completed its total break with the united Church in 1930, having amended their copy of the original constitution to blot out all references to the 'Free Wesleyan Church of Tonga' and abrogating all ties to any denomination that was affiliated with the Australasian Methodist Connexion. It was, therefore, logical that instead of approaching any of the Methodist Churches overseas, the STT would secure the appointment of a minister from the Presbyterian Church in New Zealand to succeed Watkin (who had already died in 1925) as their new president. The STT provisional committee confirmed the appointment of a retired Presbyterian pastor, the Reverend Robert Gordon-Kirgan ('Misa Kēkane'), who was the last non-Tongan minister to assume the presidency within the denomination. His administration was followed by a dynastic succession of the Fonua family, commencing with its patriarch, the Reverend Paula Fonua, former pastor of the Neiafu Free Church and a close associate of Watkin who joined him in resigning from the Free Wesleyan Church.

It was during Gordon-Kirgan's presidency that disagreements with the chiefs arose with regards to church finances and presidential authority. This led to the founding of the Church of Tonga (Siasi 'o Tonga, also known in Tongan as the Siasi Tonga Hou'eiki or 'Chiefly Tongan Church') in 1928, by chiefs and ministers who were affronted by the President's insistence on financial accountability within the STT and deference to himself rather than to the aristocracy. This group of dissatisfied churchmen were led by Lord Fīnau 'Ulukālala.

Despite the break, the STT continues to perpetuate the laws, practices, doctrines and writings of the pre-1885 Wesleyan Methodist Church from which its forerunners seceded. This is due to the fact that the schismatics of 1885 still strongly desired to be identified with Wesleyan Methodism and to be recognised by the overseas Methodist Churches as the successor of the Wesleyan Mission, and the national Connexion throughout the Kingdom of Tonga.

== Clergy ==
=== Orders of Ministry ===
Free Wesleyan holy orders consists of a twofold ministry: the Presbyterate, and the Stewardship/Diaconate. The Superintendency/Episcopate is understood to be a particular office within the broader ministry of the Presbyterate, not a separate order in itself, as is the case among the High Church jurisdictions such as the Nordic Evangelical-Lutheran, Anglican and Roman Catholic Churches. The discipline of presbyters is a prerogative of the Presbyters' Conference, which is an exclusive session consisting of ordained ministers. Stewards, however, may be tried in the assembly corresponding to their level of responsibility, such as the Congregational Meeting for a Local Steward and the Circuit Meeting for a Circuit Steward.

Presbyters, or faifekau, within the Church must be ordained, a process that takes between five and eight years, and can involve many stages of probation and internship. Ministerial candidates are not immediately required to attend theological seminary, because doing so in the past has created shortages of educators in the Church's schools while the candidates were attending to their studies. Following in the traditional Methodist polity, the Church prescribes the election and appointment of congregational, circuit and district sētuata (Stewards) to assist in the spiritual and logistical oversight of parishes, a historical solution to the shortage of ordained ministers.

=== Ministerial Candidacy ===
A key feature of ministerial candidacy within the Free Wesleyan Church of Tonga is its insistence on the old practice of having the local congregations decide the worthiness of an individual for holy orders. Normally, individuals must be endorsed by the popular vote of their local church before their application for candidacy can even be considered by the Presbyters' Conference. This process can be arduous at times, and may result in the overlooking of an industrious - yet unknown - individual, a possibility that is checked by the privileges of the Board of Theological Studies, which may bypass the endorsement of local congregations in order to recommend a candidate directly to the Presbyters' Conference, provided that the person has satisfied certain criteria.

=== Retirement and Marriage ===
Church ministers and connexional stewards (those who are appointed by the Annual General Conference, instead of a local congregation) may serve until the age of 70 years, in which case they may honourably retire as supernumerary officers unless recalled by the Conference to continued service. Supernumerary officers are under the jurisdiction of the President, an emergency provision that ensures the immediate appointment of replacements to fill in unexpected vacancies instead of having to postpone for confirmation by the General Conference at its next annual session.

Like its other evangelical counterparts, the Free Wesleyan Church permits its clergy to be married, and even encourages it, since married clergy have historically displayed a greater efficiency in their ministry and mission, their spouses often proving to be instrumental in encouraging and assisting their work, whether it be in the founding of women's departments, the establishment of schools or the teaching of trades and basic crafts to the local community.

=== Recent Developments ===
Recently, the Church's Annual General Conference has ratified a proposal to raise the minimum requirement for theological qualification from the Tongan-based Certificate of Pastoral Ministry to the English-based Diploma in Theology. The Church prioritises the vocational training of its ministers, intertwining theological instruction with practical education in a range of trades and crafts such as carpentry, book-keeping, and agriculture at its local seminary, Sia'atoutai Theological College. Graduates from other theological institutions may be eligible for ministry in the Free Wesleyan Church, but all confirmed ministerial candidates must complete a year-long residency programme at the college with their families (if married).

== Sacraments and liturgy ==
=== Sacraments ===
The Church celebrates and enjoins the two sacraments of Baptism and the Lord's Supper (or the Eucharist).

Generally, only presbyters may perform baptisms within the FWCT; though, there are provisions for stewards and local preachers to perform the sacrament on behalf of the minister in the case of an emergency. Both child and adult baptisms are permitted, as the Church recognises that God may call individuals to faith in Him at any age, and that Christ died for all people. The celebration of the Lord's Supper is generally reserved for presbyters and connexional stewards, though recent concessions have been introduced that encourage its celebration at home by families while COVID-19 restrictions are in place.

=== Other rites ===
Other rites such as Holy Matrimony and the Burial of the Dead are prescribed in the Church's hymnal. While the former is strictly reserved for ordained ministers as authorised celebrants, the latter may be conducted by a steward or local preacher on behalf of the minister. The consecration of new church ministers is carried out in accordance with the rite of the Ordination of Presbyters, strictly reserved for use by ordained representatives who are authorised by the Presbyters' Conference to confer presbyteral orders through the imposition of hands.

== Schools ==
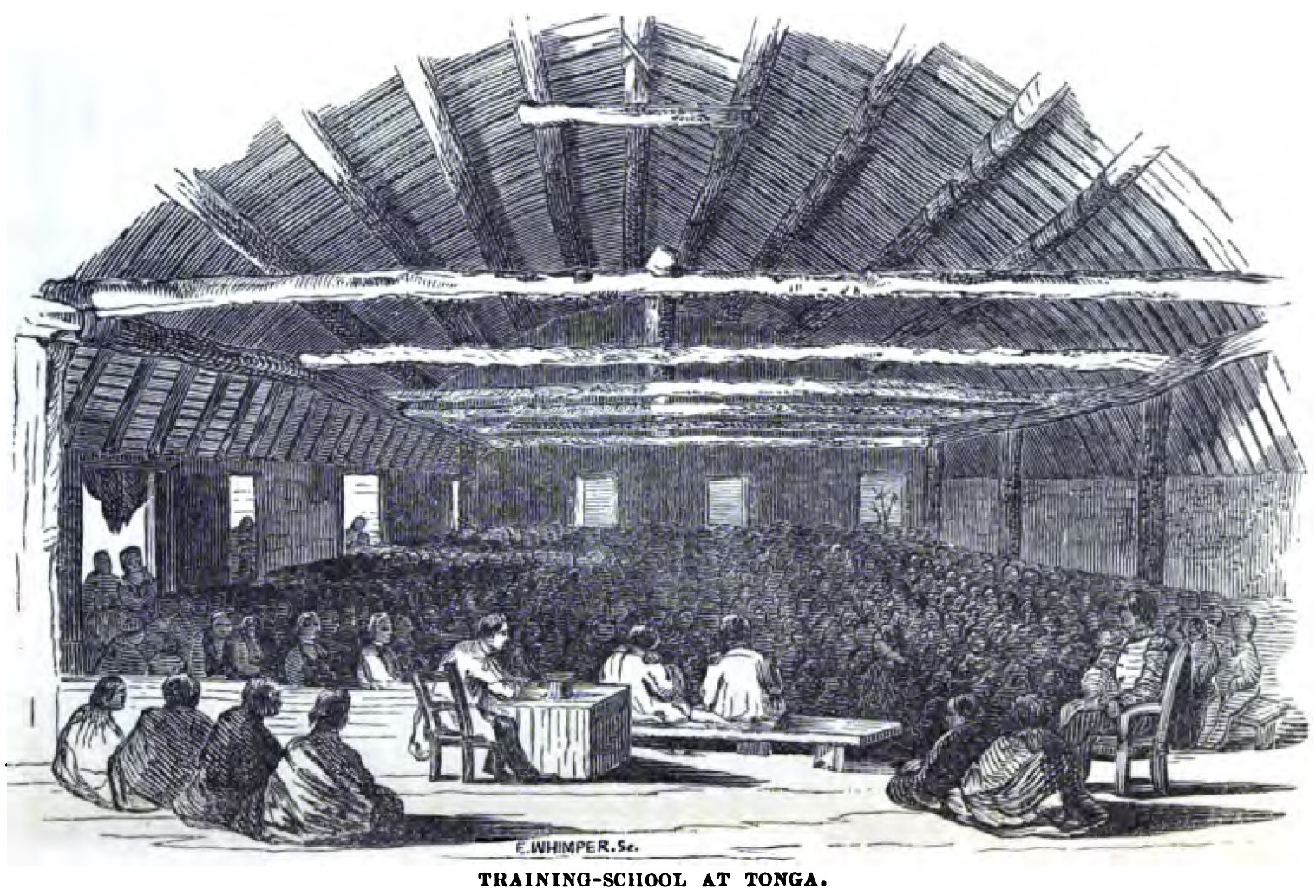
Native Training Institute at Vava'u, Tonga (June 1852).

The Free Wesleyan Church also runs 30% of the schools in Tonga. As in other schools, FWCT schools usually do not have class on Fridays, but instead use the day for school cleanup; all school facilities in Tonga are maintained by the students. School uniforms are the church's colors: royal blue and white.

== Leaders ==
=== Current Leaders ===
The current President of the Free Wesleyan Church is Rev. Dr. Tevita Koloa'ia Havea, the Secretary-General is Rev. Mr. 'Alifeleti 'Atiola. They both took their office in the 98th General Conference held in 2021. Dr. Havea also serves as the Royal Chaplain to His Majesty, King Tupou VI, and the Royal Family of Tonga. The ministers for each congregation, circuit and district are stationed by the President and confirmed by the General Conference, the latter of which is the highest decision-making body within the Free Wesleyan Church of Tonga.

Listed below are those who are currently serving as Chairpersons and Superintendents of the Church's Districts as of the Standing Orders of the 2020 Presbyters' Special Conference:

Current Chairpersons & Superintendents
Chairperson/Superintendent	District	
Rev. Ms. Mele Malinga Mausia	Tongatapu	
Rev. Mr. Pulonga-'A-Tonga 'Iki	'Eua	
Rev. Mr. 'Atunaisa Mafile'o-Superintendent	Rev. Mr. Tevita Fakataha To’a -Chairperson	Ha'apai
Rev. Mr. Vilitonu Satini -Superintendent	Rev. Mr. Dr. Tevita Hala Palefau-Chairperson	Vava'u
Rev. Mr. Paula Sinani To’a	Niua Fo'ou	
Rev. Mr. ‘Ulunga Sikaleti	Niua Toputapu	
Rev. Mr. Fredrick Tu’i Feki	Aotearoa/New Zealand	
Rev. Mr. Siosifa Koloti Ma’u	Australia	
Rev. Mr. Siosifa Pulu	United States of America	

Listed below are those who are currently looking after the FWCT Churches in UK Japan Fiji American Samoa

Current Rectors & Ministers
Rector/Minister	Congregation/Associated Body	Country
Rev. Mr. Manuokafoa Tu’ipulotu	Wales	
Rev. Mr. Filise Kafu	Fiji	
Still Looking into it	American Samoa	
Rev. Mr. 'Osaiasi V. Takeifanga	Japan	

=== Presidency ===
The President's role resembles that of a patriarch or primate in the high church tradition; he oversees the Church's general ministry, presides over its councils and assemblies, appoints its ministers and provides overall pastoral care and support to the Tongan Connexion. The successor to the Office of President is elected every year at the annual General Conference session. Presidents-elect are confirmed in their station by the reigning Tongan monarch, in accordance with the Church's constitution. In the event that the Presidency is prematurely vacated, whether by death, resignation, deposition or chronic incapacitation of the incumbent, the immediate former-president may be appointed as provisional moderator of the Church until the next General Conference, in which a new successor will be elected. Though the presidential term is only a year long, it is the custom of the Church - if the General Conference is satisfied with the individual's character, conduct and doctrine - to re-elect the same candidate year after year until retirement. This custom enables a spirit of continuity to develop within the Church, much like the life-long clerical incumbency within high church jurisdictions such the Eastern Orthodox and Roman Catholic Churches.

Listed below are those who have served as President of the Free Wesleyan Church of Tonga, together with their duration of service:

Presidents of the Church
President	Duration of Service
Rev. Mr. Jabez B. Watkin (old Free Church)	1885 - 1924
Rev. Mr. Setaleki Manu	1924 - 25
Rev. Mr. Rodger Page	1925 - 46
Rev. Mr. Alfred E. Mckay	1946 - 56
Rev. Mr. Ronald Woodgate	1956 - 61
Rev. Mr. Howard B. Secomb	1961 - 63
Rev. Mr. George G. Harris	1963 - 69
Rev. Mr. Justin J. Gooderham	1969 - 71
Rev. Dr. Sione A. Havea	1971 - 77; 1982–92
Rev. Dr. Uiliami H. Mo'ungaloa	1977 - 82
Rev. Mr. Sione L. To'a	1992 - 93
Rev. Mr. Lopeti Taufa	1993 - 98
Rev. Dr. 'Alifaleti M. Mone	1998 - 2009
Rev. Dr. Finau P. 'Ahio	2009 - 2021
Rev. Dr. Tevita K. Havea	2021–Present
