= Tonga =

Country in Oceania

Kingdom of Tonga Puleʻanga Fakatuʻi ʻo Tonga
- Flag Coat of arms
- Motto: "Ko e ʻOtua mo Tonga ko hoku tofiʻa" "God and Tonga are my inheritance"
- Anthem: "Ko e fasi ʻo e tuʻi ʻo e ʻOtu Tonga" "Song of the King of the Tonga Islands"
- Capital and largest city: Nukuʻalofa; 21°8′S 175°12′W
- Official languages: Tongan; English
- Ethnic groups (2021): 96.5% Tongan; 3.5% others
- Demonym: Tongan
- Government: Semi-constitutional monarchy
  - Monarch: Tupou VI
  - Prime Minister: Fatafehi Fakafānua
  - Assembly Speaker: ʻAlipate Tuʻivanuavou Vaea
- Legislature: Legislative Assembly

Formation
  - Tuʻi Tonga Empire: 900
  - Unification: c. 1845
  - Treaty of Friendship makes British protected state: 18 May 1900
  - End of protectorate; Sovereignty restored: 4 June 1970

Area
  - Total: 748 km^{2} (289 sq mi) (175th)
  - Water (%): 4.0

Population
  - 2021 census: 100,179 (183rd)
  - Density: 139/km^{2} (360.0/sq mi) (92nd)
- GDP (PPP): 2019 estimate
  - Total: $655 million
  - Per capita: $6,496
- GDP (nominal): 2019 estimate
  - Total: $493 million
  - Per capita: $4,888
- Gini (2021): ▼27.1 low inequality
- HDI (2022): ▲0.739 high (98th)
- Currency: Paʻanga (TOP)
- Time zone: UTC+13
- Calling code: +676
- ISO 3166 code: TO
- Internet TLD: .to
- 1. Based on 2005 figures.

Tonga, (Note: /ˈtɒŋə/ TONG-ə, /ˈtɒŋɡə/ TONG-gə; (Note: Both pronunciations are used in English, although the former is preferred as it is closer to the Tongan pronunciation. In North America and the United Kingdom, both pronunciations are used, while the preferred pronunciation (i.e the former) is almost always used in Australia, New Zealand and the Pacific Islands.) Tongan: [ˈtoŋa]) officially the Kingdom of Tonga, (Note: Tongan: Puleʻanga Fakatuʻi ʻo Tonga) is an island country in Polynesia, part of Oceania. The country has 171 islands, of which 45 are inhabited. Its total surface area is about 750 km^{2} (290 sq mi), scattered over 700,000 km^{2} (270,000 sq mi) in the southern Pacific Ocean. As of September 2026, Tonga has a population of 103,291, 70% of whom live on the main island, Tongatapu. The country stretches approximately 800 km (500 mi; 430 nmi) north-south. It is surrounded by Fiji and Wallis and Futuna (France) to the northwest, Samoa to the northeast, New Caledonia (France) and Vanuatu to the west, Niue (the nearest foreign territory) to the east and Kermadec (New Zealand) to the southwest. Tonga is about 1,800 km (1,100 mi; 970 nmi) from New Zealand's North Island.

Tonga was first inhabited roughly 2,500 years ago by people who were a part of the Lapita culture, Polynesian settlers who gradually evolved a distinct and strong ethnic identity, language, and culture as the Tongan people. They quickly established a powerful footing across the South Pacific, and this period of Tongan expansionism and colonization is known as the Tuʻi Tonga Empire. From the rule of the first Tongan king, ʻAhoʻeitu, Tonga grew into a regional power. It was a thalassocracy that conquered and controlled unprecedented swathes of the Pacific, from parts of the Solomon Islands and the whole of New Caledonia and Fiji in the west to Samoa and Niue and even as far as parts of modern-day French Polynesia in the east. Tuʻi Tonga became renowned for its economic, ethnic, and cultural influence over the Pacific, which remained strong even after the Samoan revolution of the thirteenth century and Europeans' discovery of the islands in 1616.

From 1900 to 1970, Tonga had British protected-state status. The United Kingdom looked after Tonga's foreign affairs under a Treaty of Friendship, but Tonga never relinquished its sovereignty to any foreign power. In 2010, Tonga took a decisive step away from its traditional absolute monarchy and became a semi-constitutional monarchy, after legislative reforms paved the way for its first partial representative elections.

Tonga is a member of the Commonwealth of Nations, the United Nations, the Pacific Islands Forum, and the Alliance of Small Island States.

== Etymology ==
In many Polynesian languages, including Tongan, the word tonga (Tongan: [ˈtoŋa]), comes from fakatonga, which means 'southwards', and the archipelago is so named because it is the southernmost group among the island groups of western Polynesia. The word tonga is cognate to the Hawaiian word kona meaning 'leeward', which is the origin of the name for the Kona District in Hawaiʻi.

Tonga became known in the West as the "Friendly Islands" because of the congenial reception accorded to Captain James Cook on his first visit in 1773. He arrived at the time of the annual ʻinasi festival, which centres on the donation of the First Fruits to the Tuʻi Tonga (the islands' monarch), so he received an invitation to the festivities. Ironically, according to the writer William Mariner, the political leaders actually wanted to kill Cook during the gathering, but did not go through with it because they could not agree on a plan of action for accomplishing it.

== History ==
According to Tongan mythology, the demigod Maui drew up a group of islands from the ocean, first appearing Tongatapu, the Ha'apai Islands and Vava'u, integrating into what became modern-day Tonga.

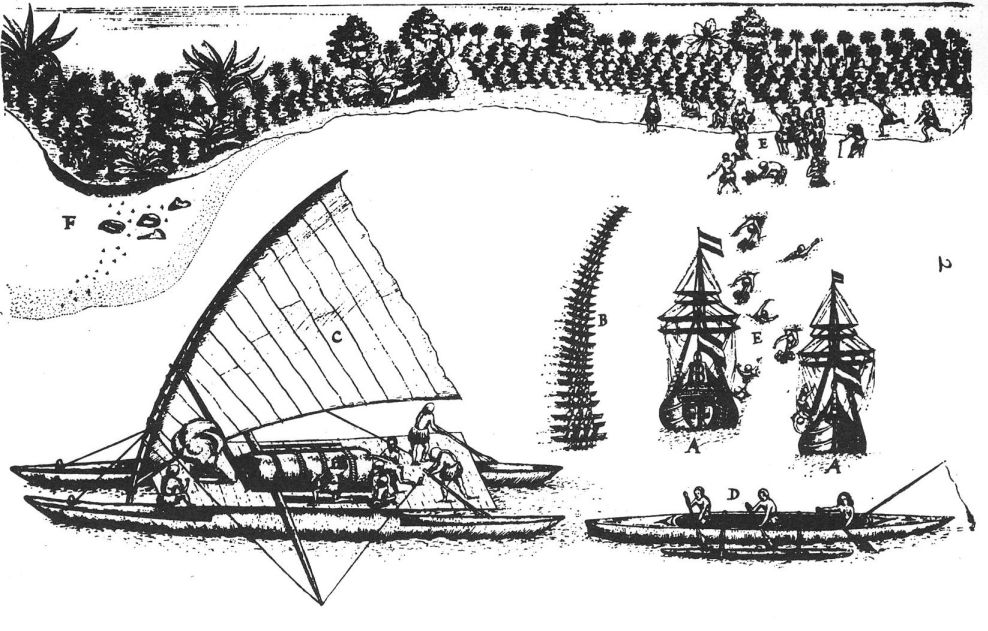
The arrival of Abel Tasman in Tongatapu, 1643; drawing by Isaack Gilsemans

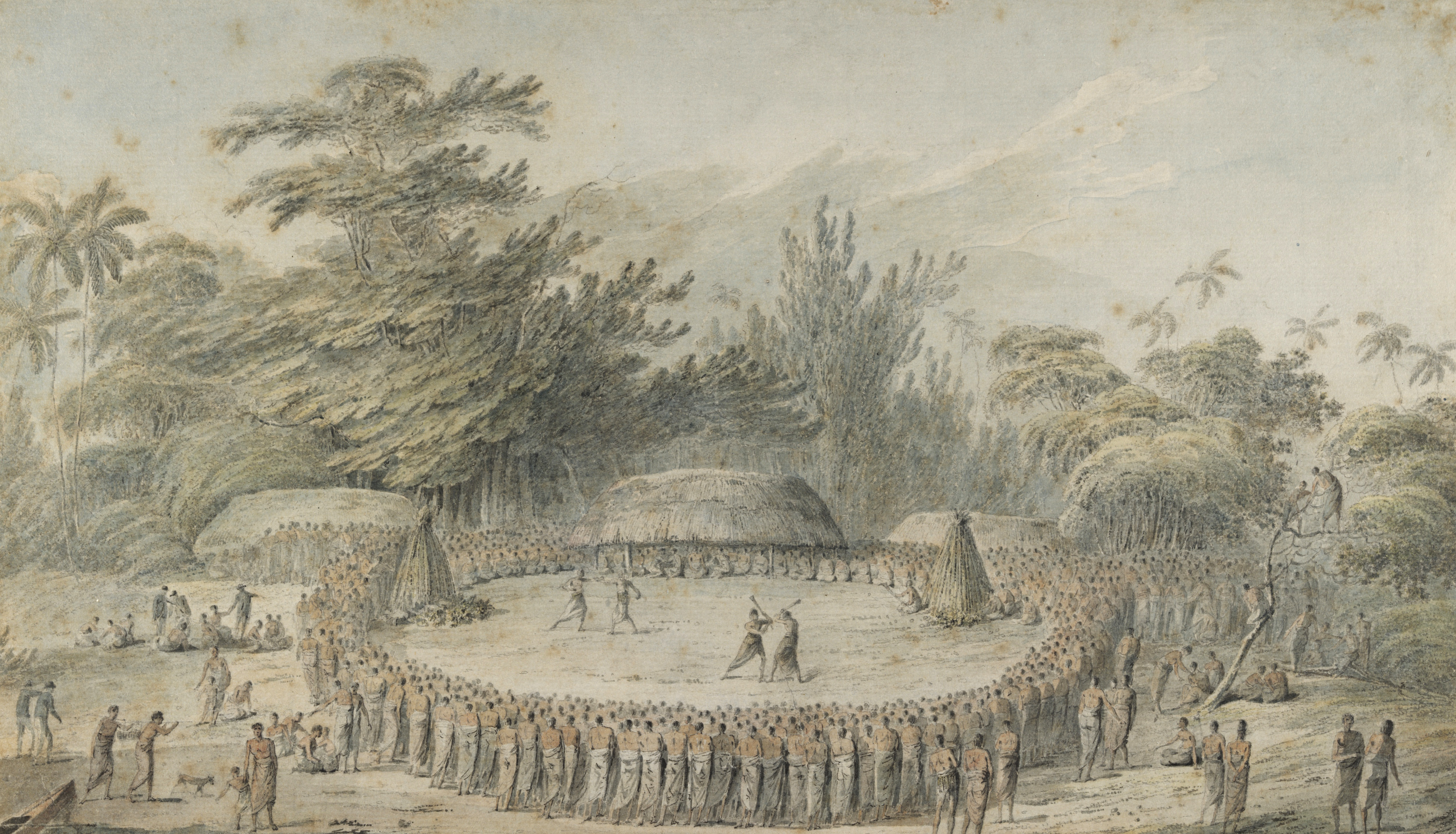
Reception for Captain Cook, Ha'apai, Tonga, 1773-1784

An Austronesian-speaking group linked to what archaeologists call the Lapita culture covered from Island Melanesia to Samoa, and then on to inhabit Tonga sometime between 1500 and 1000 BC. Scholars still debate exactly when Tonga was first settled, but thorium dating confirms that settlers had arrived in the earliest known inhabited town, Nukuleka, by 888 BC, ± 8 years. Tonga's precontact history was shared via oral history, which was passed down from generation to generation.

By the 12th century, Tongans and the Tongan monarch, the Tuʻi Tonga, had acquired a reputation across the central Pacific – from Niue, Samoa, Rotuma, Wallis and Futuna, New Caledonia to Tikopia, leading some historians to speak of a Tuʻi Tonga Empire having existed during that period. Civil wars are known to have occurred in Tonga in the 15th and 17th centuries.

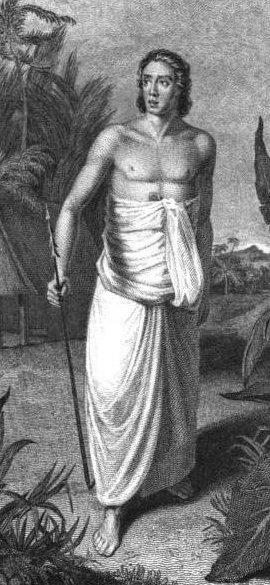
William Mariner was a teenaged English sailor adopted into a royal Tongan family.

The Tongan people first encountered Europeans in 1616, when the Dutch vessel Eendracht, captained by Willem Schouten, made a short visit to the islands for the purpose of engaging in trade. Later, other Dutch explorers arrived, including Jacob Le Maire (who visited the northern island of Niuatoputapu); and Abel Tasman (who visited Tongatapu and Haʻapai) in 1643. Later noteworthy European visitors included James Cook, of the British Royal Navy, in 1773, 1774, and 1777; Spanish Navy explorers Francisco Mourelle de la Rúa in 1781; Alessandro Malaspina in 1793; the first Protestant missionaries in 1797; and a Wesleyan Methodist minister, Reverend Walter Lawry, in 1822.

Whaling vessels were among the earliest regular Western visitors. The first of these on record is the Ann and Hope, which was reported to have been seen among the islands of Tonga in June 1799. The last known whaling visitor was the Albatross in 1899. That ship arrived in Tonga seeking a resupply of water, food, and wood. The islands most regularly visited by Westerners were Ata, 'Eua, Ha'apai, Tongatapu, and Vava'u. Sometimes, Tongan men were recruited to serve as crewmen on these vessels. The United States Exploring Expedition visited Tonga in 1840.

In 1845, an ambitious young Tongan warrior, strategist, and orator named Tāufaʻāhau united Tonga into a kingdom. He held the chiefly title of Tuʻi Kanokupolu, but had been baptised by Methodist missionaries with the name Siaosi ("George") in 1831. In 1875, with the help of missionary Shirley Waldemar Baker, he declared Tonga a constitutional monarchy, formally adopted the Western royal style, emancipated the "serfs", enshrined a code of law, land tenure, and freedom of the press, and limited the power of the chiefs.

Tonga became a protected state under a Treaty of Friendship with Britain on 18 May 1900, when European settlers and rival Tongan chiefs unsuccessfully tried to oust the man who had succeeded Tāufaʻāhau as king. The treaty posted no higher permanent representative on Tonga than a British consul (1901–1970). Under British protection, Tonga maintained its sovereignty and remained the only Pacific nation to retain its monarchical government. The Tongan monarchy has an uninterrupted succession of hereditary rulers from a single family.

The 1918 flu pandemic, brought to Tonga by a ship from New Zealand, killed 1,800 Tongans, a mortality rate of about 8%.

The Treaty of Friendship and Tonga's protection status ended in 1970 under arrangements that had been established by Tonga's Queen Salote Tupou III before her death in 1965. Owing to its British ties, Tonga joined the Commonwealth in 1970 (atypically as a country that had its own monarch, rather than having the United Kingdom's monarch, along with Malaysia, Brunei, Lesotho, and Eswatini). Tonga became a member of the United Nations in September 1999. While exposed to colonial pressures, Tonga has always governed itself, which makes it unique in the Pacific.

In January 2022, the Hunga Tonga–Hunga Haʻapai volcano, 65 km (40 mi; 35 nmi) north of the main island of Tongatapu, erupted, causing a tsunami which inundated parts of the archipelago, including the capital Nukuʻalofa. Comparable to the size of the 1883 eruption of Krakatoa, the Hunga volcano produced an atmospheric explosion never before documented in the modern geophysical record (not including man-made explosions). The eruption affected the kingdom heavily, cutting off most communications and killing four people in Tonga. In Peru, two women drowned due to abnormal tsunami waves. It took around five weeks to repair a submarine fiber optic cable used in the Tonga Cable System for internet and telephone connectivity.

== Geography ==
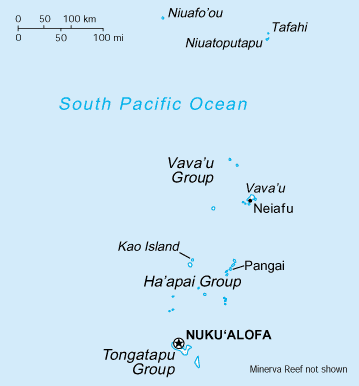
A map of Tonga

Located in Oceania, Tonga is an archipelago in the South Pacific Ocean, directly south of Samoa and about two-thirds of the way from Hawaiʻi to New Zealand. Its 171 islands, 45 of them inhabited, are divided into three main groups – Vava'u, Ha'apai, and Tongatapu – and cover an 800-kilometre (500-mile; 430-nautical-mile)-long north–south line.

The largest island, Tongatapu, on which the capital city of Nukuʻalofa is located, covers 257 square kilometres (99 sq mi). Geologically, the Tongan islands are of two types: most have a limestone base formed from uplifted coral formations; others consist of limestone overlaying a volcanic base.

=== Climate ===
Tonga has a tropical rainforest climate (Af) with a distinct warm period (December–April), during which the temperatures rise above 32 °C (89.6 °F), and a cooler period (May–November), with temperatures rarely rising above 27 °C (80.6 °F). The temperature and rainfall range from 23 °C (73.4 °F) and 1,700 mm (66.9 in) on Tongatapu in the south to 27 °C (80.6 °F) and 2,970 mm (116.9 in) on the more northerly islands closer to the Equator.

The average wettest period is around March, with on average 263 mm (10.4 in). The average daily humidity is 80%. The highest temperature recorded in Tonga was 35 °C (95 °F) on 11 February 1979 in Vava'u. The coldest temperature recorded in Tonga was 8.7 °C (47.7 °F) on 8 September 1994 in Fua'amotu. Temperatures of 15 °C (59 °F) or lower are usually measured in the dry season and are more frequent in southern Tonga than in the northern islands. The tropical cyclone season currently runs from 1 November to 30 April, though tropical cyclones can form and affect Tonga outside of the season. According to the WorldRiskReport 2021, Tonga ranks third among the countries with the highest disaster risk worldwide – mainly due to the country's exposure to multiple natural hazards.

Climate data for Nukuʻalofa (Köppen Af)
Month	Jan	Feb	Mar	Apr	May	Jun	Jul	Aug	Sep	Oct	Nov	Dec	Year
Record high °C (°F)	32 (90)	32 (90)	31 (88)	30 (86)	30 (86)	28 (82)	28 (82)	28 (82)	28 (82)	29 (84)	30 (86)	31 (88)	32 (90)
Mean daily maximum °C (°F)	29.4 (84.9)	29.9 (85.8)	29.6 (85.3)	28.5 (83.3)	26.8 (80.2)	25.8 (78.4)	24.9 (76.8)	24.8 (76.6)	25.3 (77.5)	26.4 (79.5)	27.6 (81.7)	28.7 (83.7)	27.3 (81.1)
Daily mean °C (°F)	26.4 (79.5)	26.8 (80.2)	26.6 (79.9)	25.3 (77.5)	23.6 (74.5)	22.7 (72.9)	21.5 (70.7)	21.5 (70.7)	22.0 (71.6)	23.1 (73.6)	24.4 (75.9)	25.6 (78.1)	24.1 (75.4)
Mean daily minimum °C (°F)	23.4 (74.1)	23.7 (74.7)	23.6 (74.5)	22.1 (71.8)	20.3 (68.5)	19.5 (67.1)	18.1 (64.6)	18.2 (64.8)	18.6 (65.5)	19.7 (67.5)	21.1 (70.0)	22.5 (72.5)	20.9 (69.6)
Record low °C (°F)	16 (61)	17 (63)	15 (59)	15 (59)	13 (55)	11 (52)	10 (50)	11 (52)	11 (52)	12 (54)	13 (55)	16 (61)	10 (50)
Average rainfall mm (inches)	174 (6.9)	210 (8.3)	206 (8.1)	165 (6.5)	111 (4.4)	95 (3.7)	95 (3.7)	117 (4.6)	122 (4.8)	128 (5.0)	123 (4.8)	175 (6.9)	1,721 (67.8)
Average rainy days	17	19	19	17	15	14	15	13	13	11	12	15	180
Average relative humidity (%)	77	78	79	76	78	77	75	75	74	74	73	75	76
Source: Weatherbase

=== Ecology ===
Tonga contains the Tongan tropical moist forests terrestrial ecoregion.

In Tonga, dating back to Tongan legend, flying bats are considered sacred and are the property of the monarchy. Thus, they are protected and cannot be harmed or hunted. As a result, flying fox bats have thrived in many of the islands of Tonga.

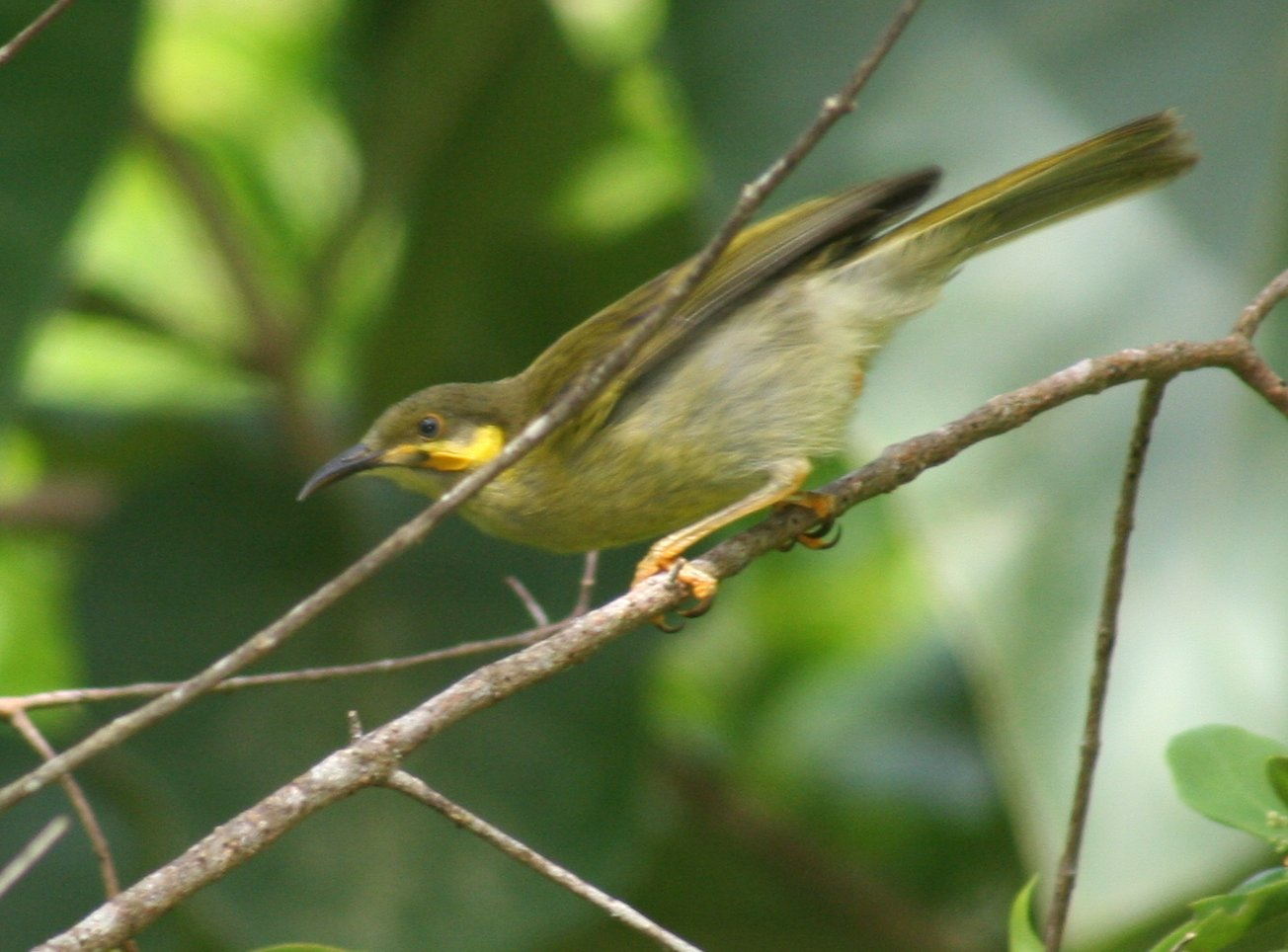
Wattled honeyeater in Tonga

The bird life of Tonga includes a total of 73 species, of which two are endemic, the Tongan whistler and the Tongan megapode. Five species have been introduced by humans, and eight are rare or accidental. Seven species are globally threatened.

== Politics ==
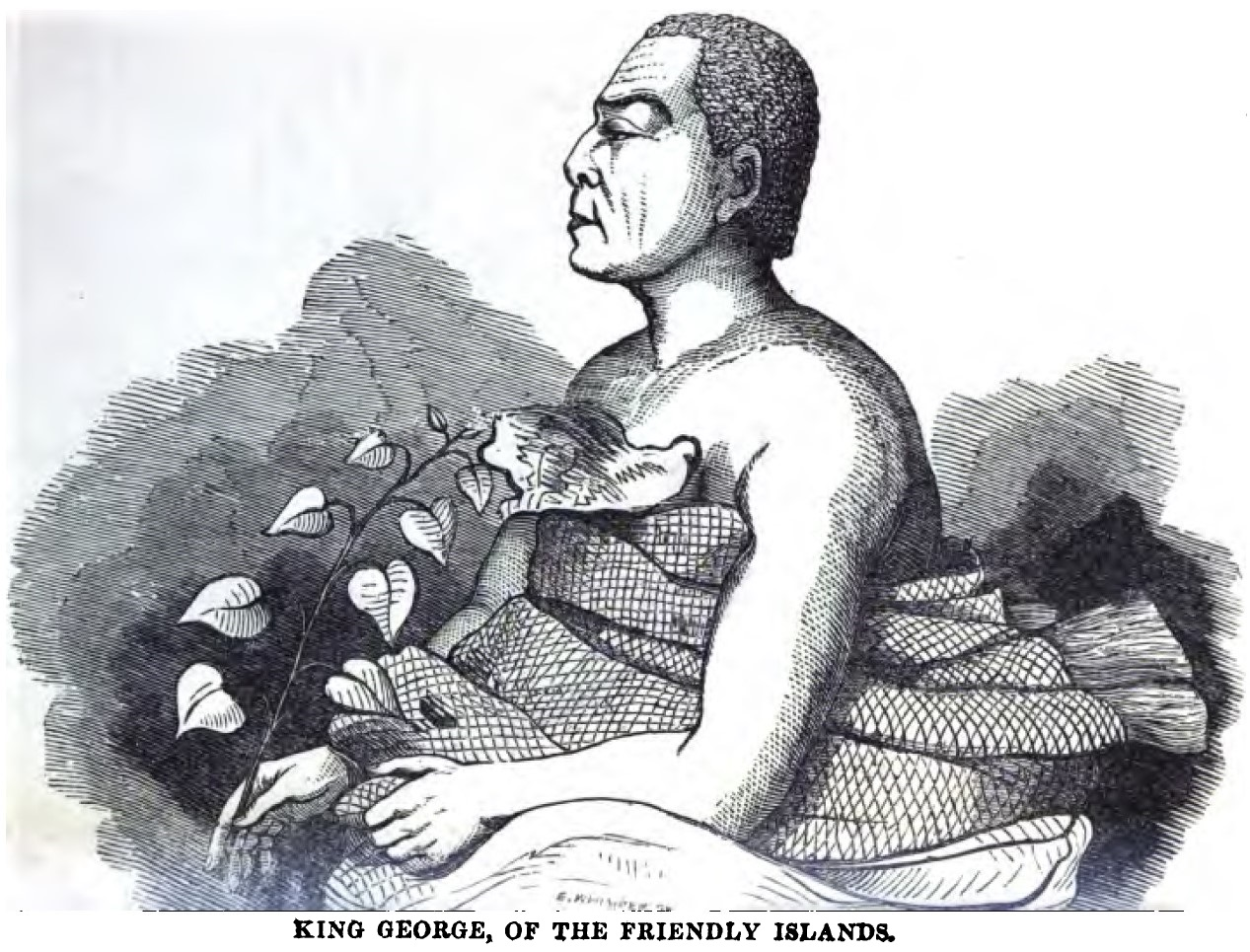
King George, of the Friendly Islands (1852)

Tonga is a constitutional monarchy. It is the only extant indigenous monarchy in the Pacific islands (see also Hawaiʻi). Reverence for the monarch replaces that held in earlier centuries for the sacred paramount chief, the Tuʻi Tonga. Criticism of the monarch is held to be contrary to Tongan culture and etiquette. Tonga provides for its citizens a free and mandatory education for all, secondary education with only nominal fees, and foreign-funded scholarships for postsecondary education.

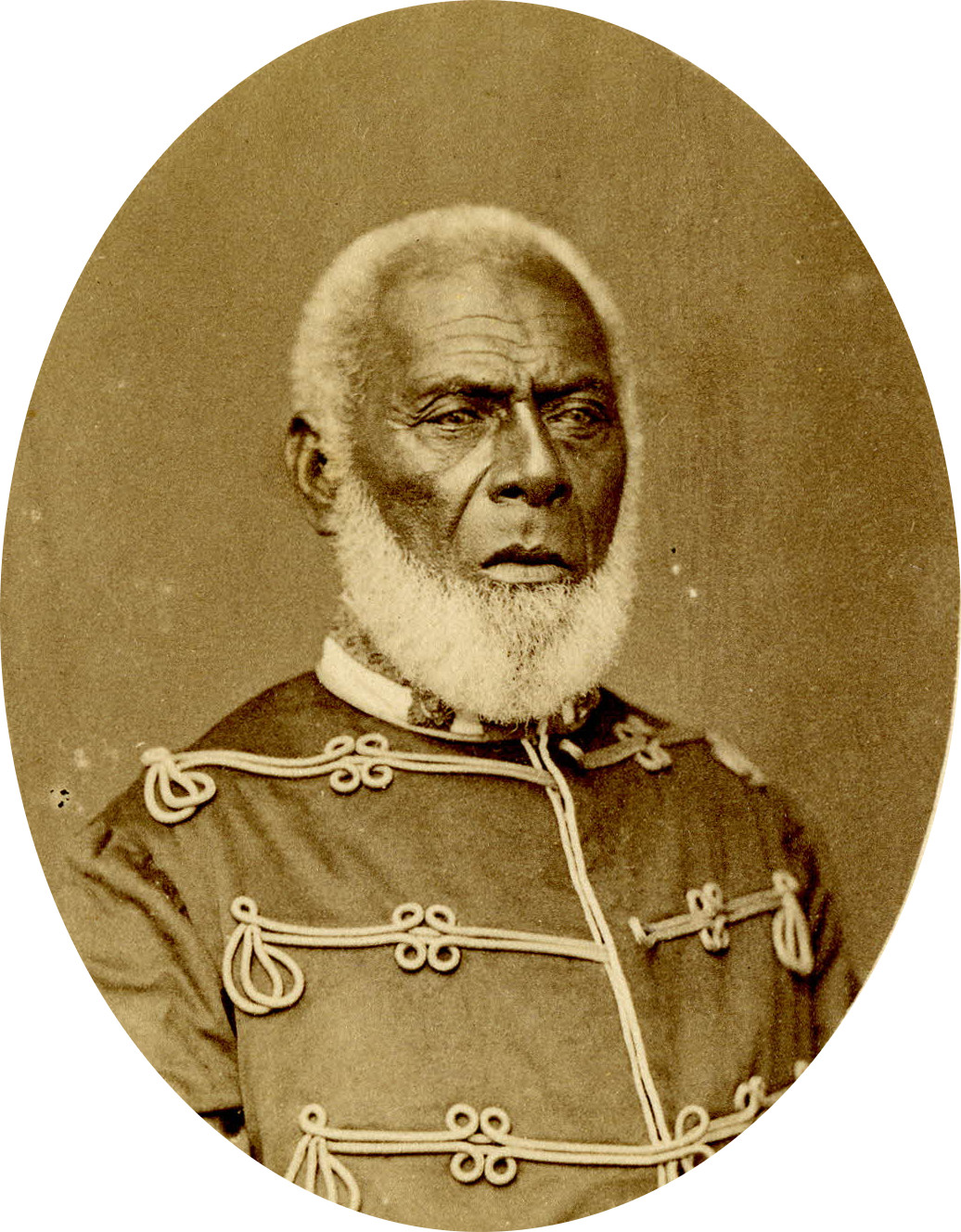
Tāufaʻāhau, King of Tonga (1845–1893)

The pro-democracy movement in Tonga promotes reforms, including better representation in the Parliament for the majority of commoners, and better accountability in matters of state. An overthrow of the monarchy is not part of the movement, and the institution of monarchy continues to hold popular support, even while reforms are advocated. Until recently, the governance issue was generally ignored by the leaders of other countries, but major aid donors and neighbours New Zealand and Australia are now expressing concerns about some Tongan government actions.

Following the precedents of Queen Sālote and the counsel of numerous international advisors, the government of Tonga under King Tāufaʻāhau Tupou IV (reigned 1965–2006) monetised the economy, internationalised the medical and education systems, and enabled access by commoners to increasing forms of material wealth (houses, cars, and other commodities), education, and overseas travel.

Male homosexuality is illegal in Tonga, with a maximum penalty of 10 years' imprisonment, but the law is not enforced. Tongans have universal access to a national health care system. The Constitution of Tonga protects land ownership; land cannot be sold to foreigners (although it may be leased).

=== Political culture ===
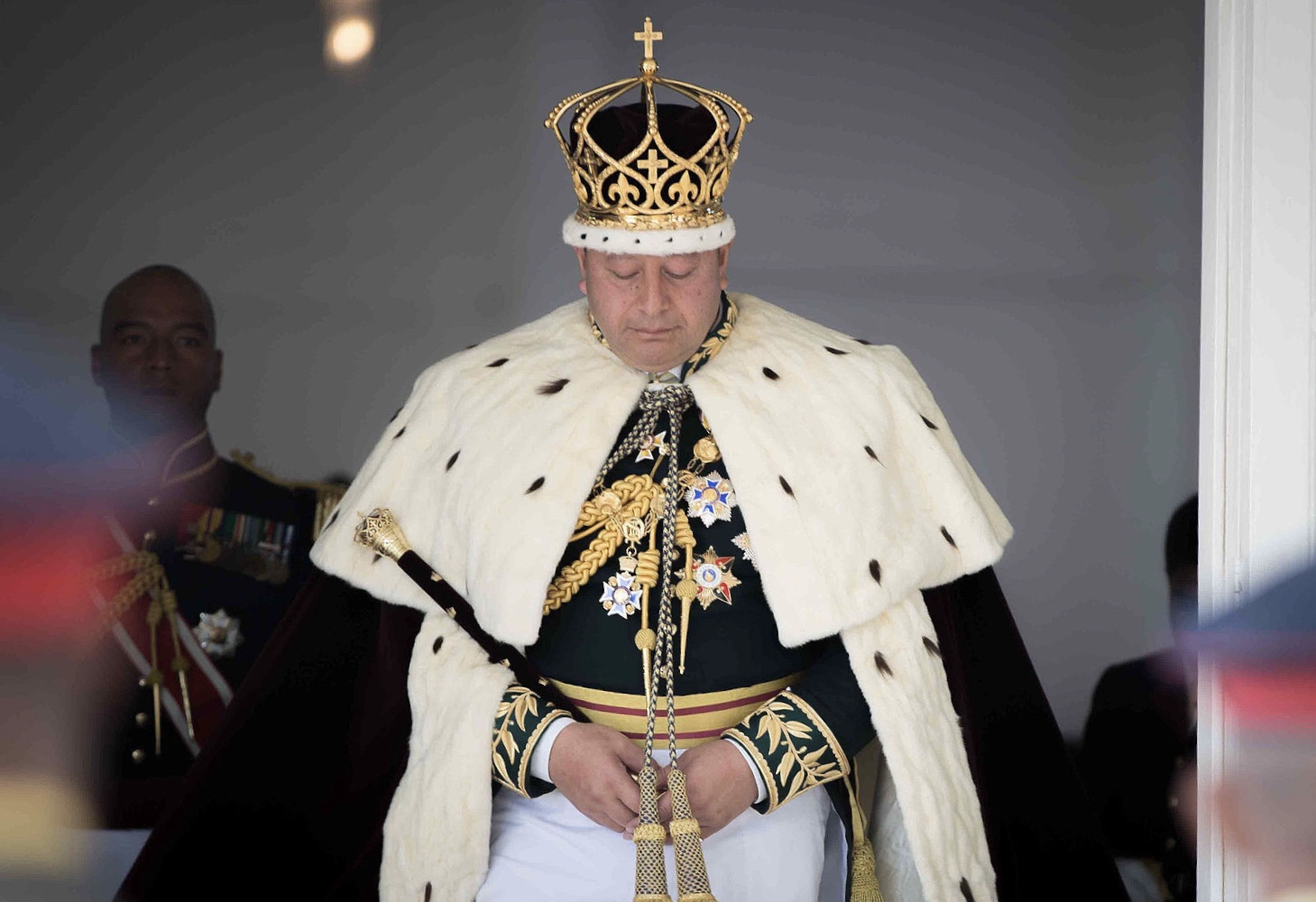
King Tupou VI during his coronation on 4 July 2015

King Tāufaʻāhau Tupou IV and his government made some problematic economic decisions and were accused by democracy activists, including former prime minister ʻAkilisi Pōhiva, of wasting millions of dollars on unwise investments. The problems have mostly been driven by attempts to increase national revenue through a variety of schemes – considering making Tonga a nuclear waste disposal site (an idea floated by the Crown Prince), and selling Tongan Protected Persons Passports (which eventually forced Tonga to naturalise the purchasers, sparking ethnicity-based concerns within Tonga).

Schemes also included the registering of foreign ships (which proved to be engaged in illegal activities, including shipments for al-Qaeda), claiming geo-orbital satellite slots (the revenue from which seems to belong to the Princess Royal, not the state), holding a long-term charter on an unusable Boeing 757 that was sidelined in Auckland Airport, leading to the collapse of Royal Tongan Airlines, and approving a factory for exporting cigarettes to China (against the advice of Tongan medical officials and decades of health-promotion messaging).

The king proved vulnerable to speculators with big promises and lost reportedly US$26 million to Jesse Bogdonoff, a financial adviser who called himself the king's court jester. The police imprisoned pro-democracy leaders, and the government repeatedly confiscated the newspaper The Tongan Times (printed in New Zealand and sold in Tonga) because the editor had been vocally critical of the king's mistakes. Notably, the Keleʻa, produced specifically to critique the government and printed in Tonga by pro-democracy leader ʻAkilisi Pōhiva, was not banned during that time. Pōhiva, however, had been subjected to harassment in the form of barratry (frequent lawsuits).

In mid-2003, the government passed a radical constitutional amendment to "Tonganize" the press, by licensing and limiting freedom of the press, so as to protect the image of the monarchy. The amendment was defended by the government and by royalists on the basis of traditional cultural values. Licensure criteria include 80% ownership by Tongans living in the country. As of February 2004, those papers denied licenses under the new act included the Taimi ʻo Tonga (Tongan Times), the Keleʻa, and the Matangi Tonga – while those permitted licenses were uniformly church-based or pro-government.

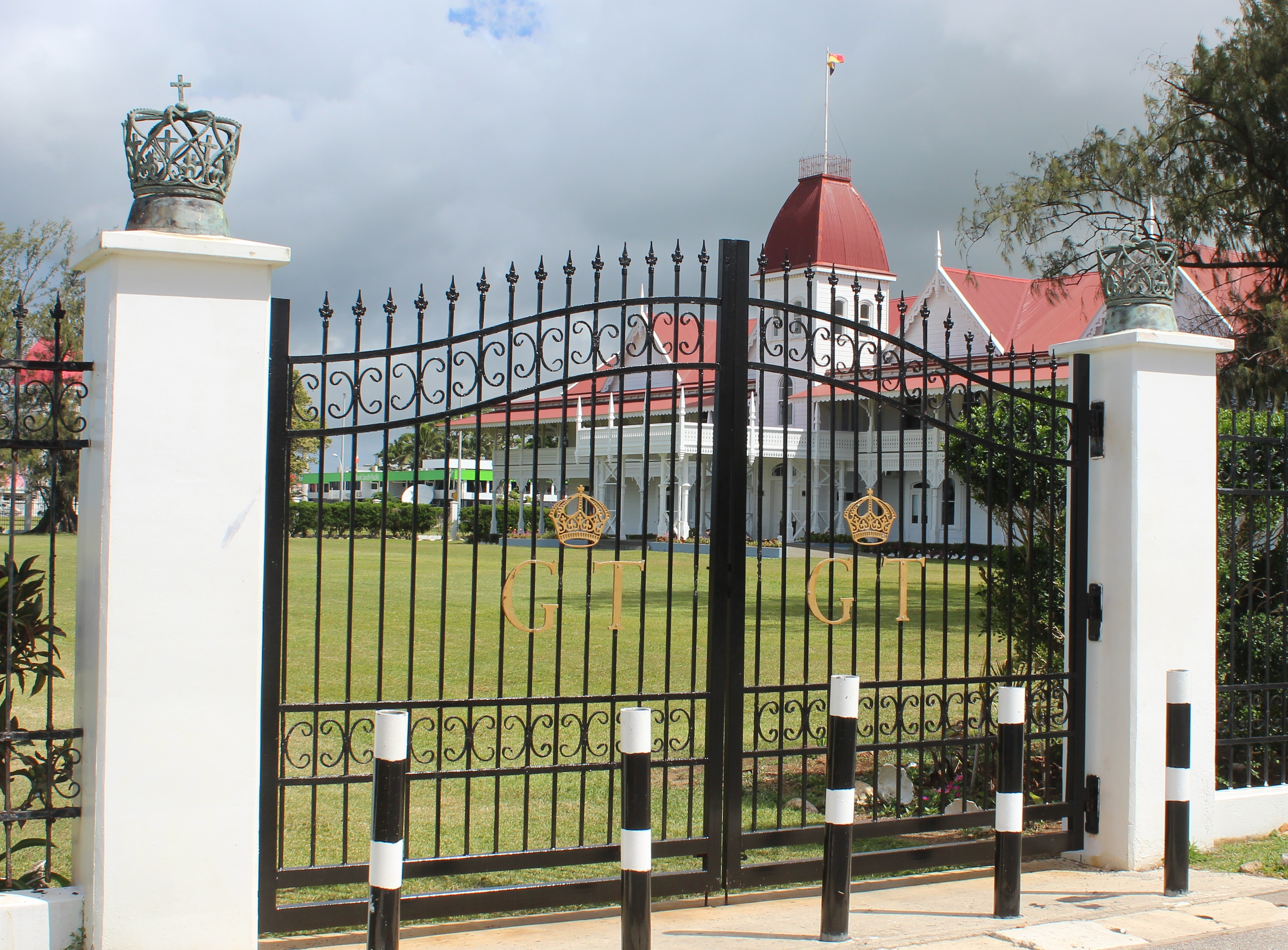
The Royal Palace of Tonga

The bill was opposed in a several-thousand-strong protest march in the capital, a call by the Tuʻi Pelehake (a prince, nephew of the king and elected member of parliament) for Australia and other nations to pressure the Tongan government to democratise the electoral system, and a legal writ calling for a judicial investigation of the bill. The latter was supported by some 160 signatures, including seven of the nine elected "People's Representatives".

The Crown Prince Tupoutoʻa and Pilolevu, the Princess Royal, remained generally silent on the issue. In total, the changes threatened to destabilise the polity, fragment support for the status quo, and place further pressure on the monarchy.

In 2005, the government spent several weeks negotiating with striking civil-service workers before reaching a settlement. The civil unrest that ensued was not limited to Tonga; protests outside the King's New Zealand residence made headlines.

Prime Minister Prince ʻAhoʻeitu ʻUnuakiʻotonga Tukuʻaho (Lavaka Ata ʻUlukālala) (now King Tupou VI) resigned suddenly on 11 February 2006 and also gave up his other cabinet portfolios. The elected minister of labour, Feleti Sevele, replaced him in the interim.

On 5 July 2006, a driver in Menlo Park, California, caused the deaths of Prince Tuʻipelehake ʻUluvalu, his wife, and their driver. Tuʻipelehake, 55, was the cochairman of the constitutional reform commission and a nephew of the king.

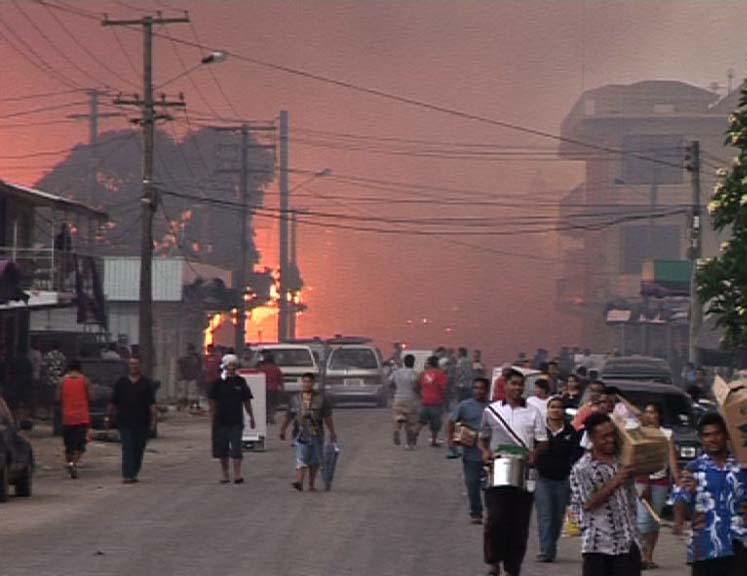
Riots in Nukuʻalofa, 2006

The public expected some changes when George Tupou V succeeded his father in September 2006. On 16 November 2006, rioting broke out in the capital city of Nukuʻalofa when it seemed that the parliament would adjourn for the year without having made any advances in increasing democracy in government. Pro-democracy activists burned and looted shops, offices, and government buildings. As a result, more than 60% of the downtown area was destroyed and as many as six people died. The disturbances were ended by action from Tongan Security Forces and troops from New Zealand-led Joint Task Force.

On 29 July 2008, the Palace announced that King George Tupou V would relinquish much of his power and would surrender his role in day-to-day governmental affairs to the Prime Minister. The royal chamberlain said that this was being done to prepare the monarchy for 2010, when most of the first parliament would be elected, and added: "The Sovereign of the only Polynesian kingdom ... is voluntarily surrendering his powers to meet the democratic aspirations of many of his people." The previous week, the government said the king had sold state assets that had contributed to much of the royal family's wealth.

On 15 March 2012, King George Tupou V contracted pneumonia and was brought to Queen Mary Hospital in Hong Kong. He was later diagnosed with leukaemia. His health deteriorated significantly shortly thereafter, and he died at 3:15 pm on 18 March 2012. He was succeeded by his brother Tupou VI, who was crowned on 4 July 2015.

=== Foreign relations ===
Tonga's foreign policy as of January 2009 was described by Matangi Tonga as "Look East" – specifically, as establishing closer diplomatic and economic relations with Asia (which actually lies to the north-west of the Pacific kingdom). As of 2021, China has attained great influence in Tonga, financing infrastructure projects, including a new royal palace and holding two thirds of the country's foreign debt.

Tonga retains cordial relations with the United States. Although it remains on good terms with the United Kingdom, the two countries do not maintain particularly close relations. The United Kingdom closed its High Commission in Tonga in 2006, although it was re-established in January 2020 after a 14-year absence. Tonga's relations with Oceania's regional powers, Australia and New Zealand, are good.

Tonga maintains strong regional ties in the Pacific. It is a full member of the Pacific Islands Forum, the South Pacific Applied Geoscience Commission, the South Pacific Tourism Organisation, the Pacific Regional Environment Programme, and the Secretariat of the Pacific Community.

In 2023, the governments of Tonga and other islands vulnerable to climate change (Fiji, Niue, the Solomon Islands, Tuvalu and Vanuatu) launched the "Port Vila Call for a Just Transition to a Fossil Fuel Free Pacific", calling for the phase out fossil fuels and the "rapid and just transition" to renewable energy and strengthening environmental law, including introducing the crime of ecocide.

=== Military ===
The Tongan government supported the American "coalition of the willing" action in Iraq and deployed more than 40 soldiers (as part of an American force) in late 2004. The contingent returned home on 17 December 2004. In 2007, a second contingent went to Iraq, and two more were sent during 2008 as part of continued support for the coalition. Tongan involvement concluded at the end of 2008 with no reported loss of life.

In 2010, Brigadier General Tauʻaika ʻUtaʻatu, commander of the His Majesty's Armed Forces, signed an agreement in London committing a minimum of 200 troops to co-operate with Britain's International Security Assistance Force in Afghanistan. The task was completed in April 2014, and the UK presented Operational Service Medals to each of the soldiers involved during a parade held in Tonga.

Tonga has contributed troops and police to the Bougainville conflict in Papua-New Guinea and to the Australian-led RAMSI force in the Solomon Islands.

=== Administrative divisions ===
Administrative subdivisions of Tonga

Tonga is subdivided into five administrative divisions: ʻEua, Haʻapai, Niuas, Tongatapu, and Vavaʻu.

== Economy ==
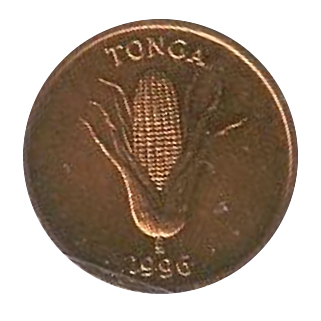
A Tongan one-cent (seniti taha) coin

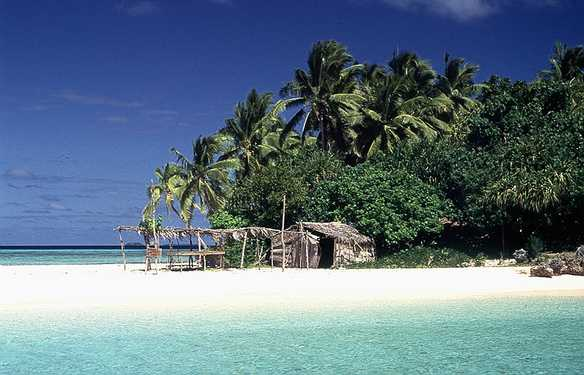
Nuku Island, Vavaʻu

Tonga's economy is characterised by a large nonmonetary sector and a heavy dependence on remittances from the half of the country's population who live abroad (chiefly in Australia, New Zealand, and the United States). The royal family and the nobles dominate and largely own the monetary sector of the economy – particularly the telecommunications and satellite services. Tonga was named the sixth-most corrupt country in the world by Forbes magazine in 2008.

Tonga was ranked the 165th-safest investment destination in the world in the March 2011 Euromoney Country Risk rankings.

The manufacturing sector consists of handicrafts and a few other very small-scale industries, which contribute only about 5% of GDP. Commercial business activities also are inconspicuous, and to a large extent, are dominated by the same large trading companies found throughout the South Pacific. In September 1974, the country's first commercial trading bank, the Bank of Tonga, opened.

Tonga's development plans emphasise a growing private sector, upgrading agricultural productivity, revitalising the squash and vanilla-bean industries, developing tourism, and improving communications and transport. Substantial progress has been made, but much work remains to be done. A small, growing construction sector is developing in response to the inflow of aid money and remittances from Tongans abroad. In recognition of such a crucial contribution, the government has created a new department in the Prime Minister's Office with the purpose of catering for the needs of Tongans living abroad. In 2007, the Tongan Parliament amended citizenship laws to allow Tongans to hold dual citizenship.

Tonga's postage stamps, featuring colourful and often unusual designs (including heart-shaped and banana-shaped stamps), are popular with philatelists.

In 2005, the country became eligible to become a member of the World Trade Organization. After an initial voluntary delay, Tonga became a full member of the WTO on 27 July 2007.

The Tonga Chamber of Commerce and Industry, incorporated in 1996, endeavours to represent the interests of its members, private sector businesses, and to promote economic growth in the Kingdom.

Tonga is home to some 106,000 people. More than double that number live overseas, mainly in the US, New Zealand, and Australia. Remittances from the overseas population have been declining since the onset of the 2008 global economic crisis. The tourism industry is improving, but remains modest at under 90,000 tourists per year.

=== Tourism ===
Tourist arrivals of 2023 in %

The tourist industry is relatively undeveloped. The government recognises that tourism can play a major role in economic development, and efforts are being made to increase this source of revenue. Cruise ships often stop in Vavaʻu, with a reputation for its whale watching, game fishing, surfing, beaches, and is increasingly becoming a major player in the South Pacific tourism market.

=== Agriculture ===
In Tonga, agriculture and forestry (together with fisheries) provide the majority of employment, foreign exchange earnings, and food. Rural Tongans rely on both plantation and subsistence agriculture. Plants grown for both market cash crops and home use include bananas, coconuts, coffee beans, vanilla beans, and root crops such as cassava, sweet potato, and taro. As of 2001, two-thirds of agricultural land was in root crops.

The processing of coconuts into copra and desiccated (dried) coconut was once the only significant industry, and only commercial export. Deteriorating prices on the world market and lack of replanting brought this once significant industry, as in most island nations of the South Pacific, to a complete standstill.

Swine and poultry are the major types of livestock. Horses are kept for draft purposes, primarily by farmers working their ʻapi ʻuta (a plot of bushland); though the meat is also coveted. More cattle are being raised, and beef imports are declining.

The traditional feudal land ownership system meant that farmers had no incentive to invest in planting long-term tree crops on land they did not own. In the late 20th century, kava and vanilla from larger plantations became the main agricultural exports, together with squash. The export of squash to Japan, beginning in 1987, once brought relief to Tonga's struggling economy, but local farmers became increasingly wary of the Japanese market due to price fluctuations, and the huge financial risks involved.

=== Energy ===
Energy in Tonga mostly comes from imported diesel. Energy consumption in Tonga was projected to reach around 66 gigawatt hours by 2020. The country aimed to reach 50% of renewable energy by 2020. In 2019, Tonga announced the construction of a 6-megawatt solar farm on Tongatapu. The plant will be the second-largest solar plant in the Pacific upon completion.

In view of the decreasing reliability of fossil-fuel electricity generation, its increasing costs, and negative environmental side effects, renewable energy solutions have attracted the government's attention. Together with IRENA, Tonga has planned a renewable energy based strategy to power the main and outer islands. The strategy focuses on solar home systems that turn individual households into small power plants. It calls for the involvement of local operators, finance institutions, and technicians to provide sustainable business models and strategies to ensure the effective operation, management, and maintenance once the systems are installed.

The Pacific Centre for Renewable Energy and Energy Efficiency was established in Tonga in 2016 to advise the private sector on related policy matters, provide capacity development and promote business investment. The centre facilitates a financial mechanism offering competitive grants for start-ups to spur the adoption of renewable energy by the business sector. The centre is part of the Global Network of Regional Sustainable Energy Centres and SIDS DOCK framework designed to attract international investment in the renewable energy sector.

With the assistance of IRENA, Tonga has developed the 2010–2020 Tonga Energy Road Map, which aims for a 50% reduction of diesel importation. This was to be accomplished through a range of appropriate renewable technologies, including wind and solar, as well as innovative efficiencies. As of 2018, Tonga was generating 10% of its electricity from renewable sources.

== Demographics ==
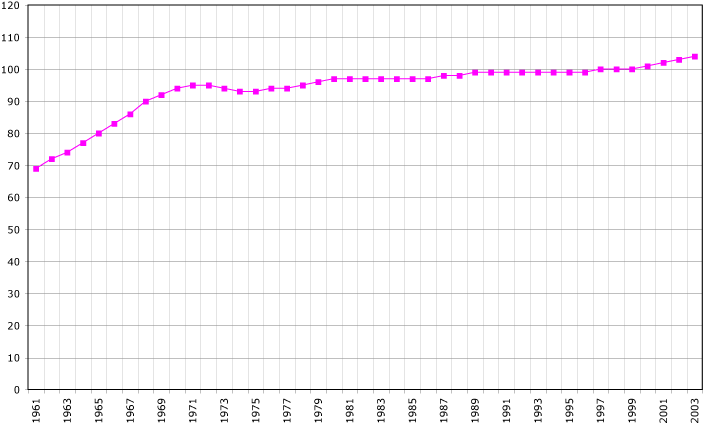
Tonga's population (1961–2003) in thousands

Over 70% of the 106,017 inhabitants live on its main island, Tongatapu. Although an increasing number of Tongans have moved into the only urban and commercial centre, Nukuʻalofa, where European and indigenous cultural and living patterns have blended, village life and kinship ties remain influential throughout the country. Despite emigration, Tonga grew in population from about 32,000 in the 1930s to more than 90,000 by 1976.

=== Ethnic groups ===
Ethnic groups in Tonga
Ethnic groups	percent
Tongan	97.03%
Part Tongan	0.79%
Chinese	0.73%
Fijian	0.3%
European	0.25%
Indo-Fijian	0.12%
Other Pacific Islander	0.2%
Other Asian	0.19%
Other	0.37%
Not stated	0.03%

According to the government portal, Tongans, Polynesian by ethnicity with a mixture of Melanesian, represent more than 98% of the inhabitants. About 1.5% are mixed Tongans and the rest are European (the majority are British), mixed European, and other Pacific Islanders. In 2001, about 3,000 to 4,000 Chinese lived there, comprising 3 to 4% of the total Tongan population. The 2006 Nukuʻalofa riots mainly targeted Chinese-owned businesses, leading to the emigration of several hundred Chinese so that only about 300 remain.

=== Languages ===
Tongan is the official language, along with English. Tongan is a Polynesian language of the Tongic branch, so it is closely related to other languages of the Tongic branch, those being: Niuean and Niuafoʻouan. Tongan is more distantly related to other Polynesian languages such as Hawaiian, Samoan, Māori, and Tahitian, among others.

=== Religion ===
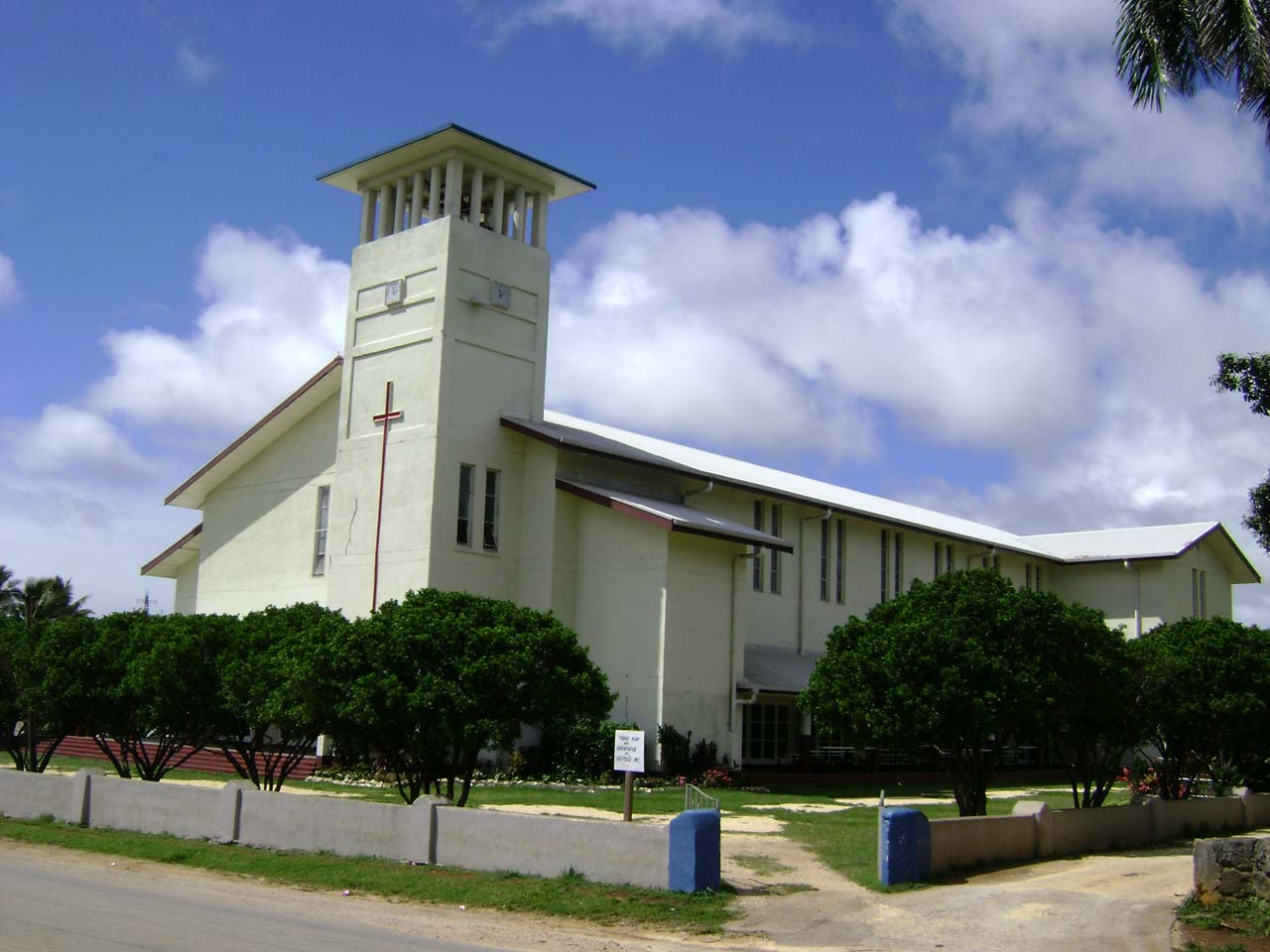
The Free Wesleyan Church

Tonga does not have an official state religion. The Constitution of Tonga (Revised 1998) provides for freedom of religion.

In 1928, Queen Salote Tupou III, who was a member of the Free Wesleyan Church of Tonga, established the Free Wesleyan Church as the state religion of Tonga. The chief pastor of the Free Wesleyan Church serves as the representative of the people of Tonga and of the church at the coronation of a king or queen of Tonga, where he anoints and crowns the monarch. In opposition to the establishment of the Free Wesleyan Church as a state religion, the Church of Tonga separated from the Free Wesleyan Church in 1928.

Islam in Tonga is a small minority religion in the country. Muslims in Tonga belong to Sunni denomination. Al-Khadeejah Mosque is a prominent mosque in Tonga.

Everyday life is heavily influenced by Polynesian traditions and by the Christian faith. The Sabbath is included in the constitution, with all commerce and entertainment activities stopped on Sundays. According to the World Factbook, as of 2016 an estimated 64.1% of the population were Protestant (including 35% who were followers of the Free Wesleyan Church, Free Church of Tonga 11.9%, Church of Tonga 6.8%, Assembly of God 2.3%, Seventh-day Adventist 2.2%, Tokaikolo Christian Church 1.6%, and 4.3% others). An estimated 18.6% were Mormons, 14.2% were Roman Catholic, and 2.4% followed other religions, while 0.5% followed no religion and 0.1% were of unspecified religious background.

The Church of Jesus Christ of Latter-day Saints sent missionaries in 1891 to visit King Siaosi (George) Tupo, where they obtained permission to preach.

=== Health ===
By some published surveys, Tonga has one of the highest obesity rates in the world. World Health Organization data published in 2014 indicate that Tonga stands fourth overall in terms of countries listed by mean body mass index data. In 2011, 90% of the adult population were considered overweight using NIH interpretation of body mass index (BMI) data, with more than 60% of those obese. 70% of Tongan females aged 15–85 are obese. Tonga and Nauru have the world's highest overweight and obese populations.

In late October 2021, Tonga reported its first case of COVID-19 based on a New Zealand air passenger's positive test.

=== Education ===
Primary education between ages 6 and 14 is compulsory and free in state schools. Mission schools provide about 8% of the primary and 90% of the secondary level of education. State schools make up for the rest. Higher education includes teacher training, nursing, and medical training, a small private university, a woman's business college, and a number of private agricultural schools. Most levels of higher education are pursued overseas.

Tongans enjoy a relatively high level of education, with a 98.9% literacy rate, and higher education up to and including medical and graduate degrees (pursued mostly overseas). They hold the body of academic knowledge created by their scholars in high esteem and the Kukū Kaunaka Collection, which comprises every doctoral and master's dissertation written by any Tongan in any country, is archived by Seu'ula Johansson-Fua at the Institute for Education in Tonga.

=== Emigration ===
Contemporary Tongans often have strong ties to overseas lands. Many Tongans have emigrated to Australia, New Zealand, or the United States to seek employment and a higher standard of living.

In 2018, 82,389 Tongans lived in New Zealand. As of 2000, 36,840 Tongans were living in the US. More than 8,000 Tongans live in Australia. The Tongan diaspora retains close ties to relatives at home, and a significant portion of Tonga's income derives from remittances to family members (often aged) who prefer to remain in Tonga.

== Culture ==
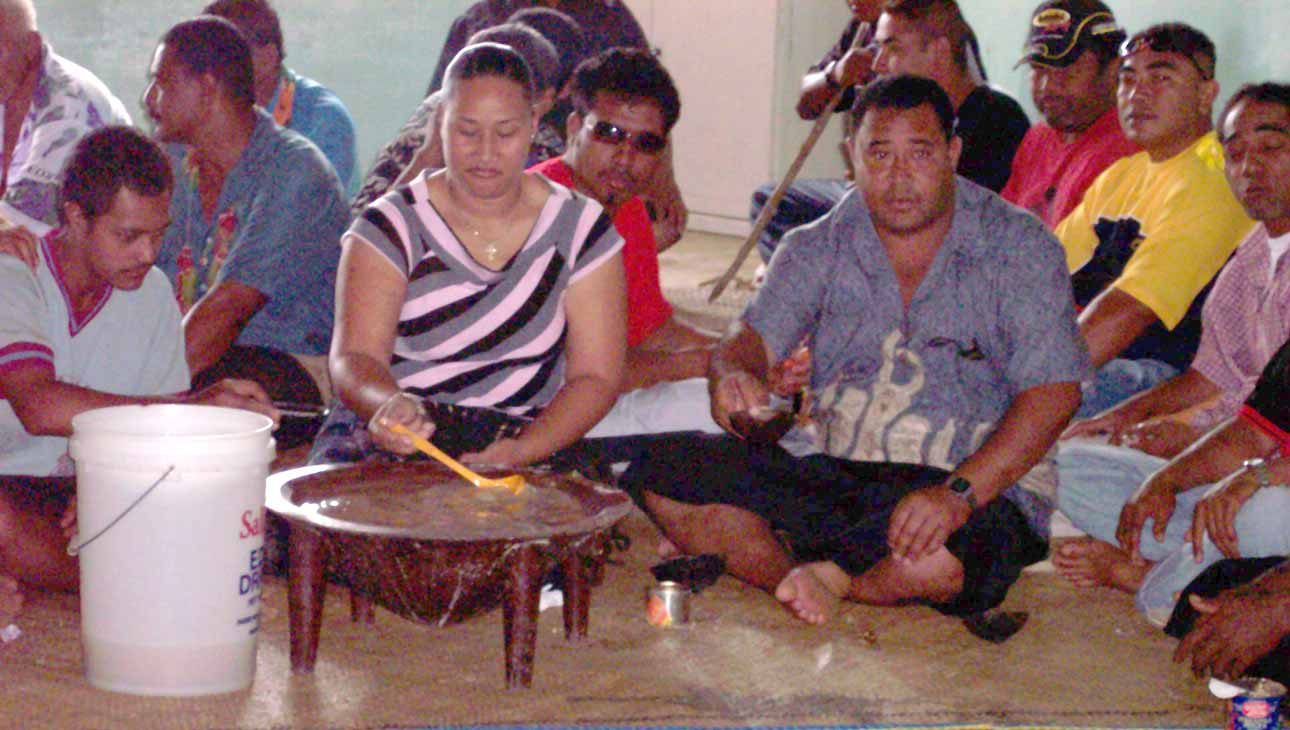
Kava culture

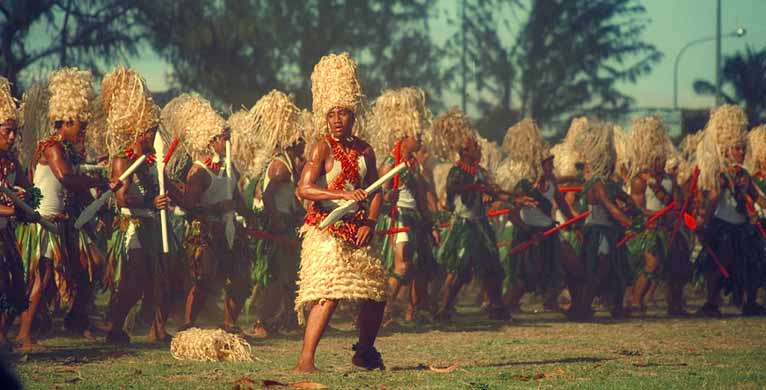
Tonga College students performing a traditional Kailao dance.

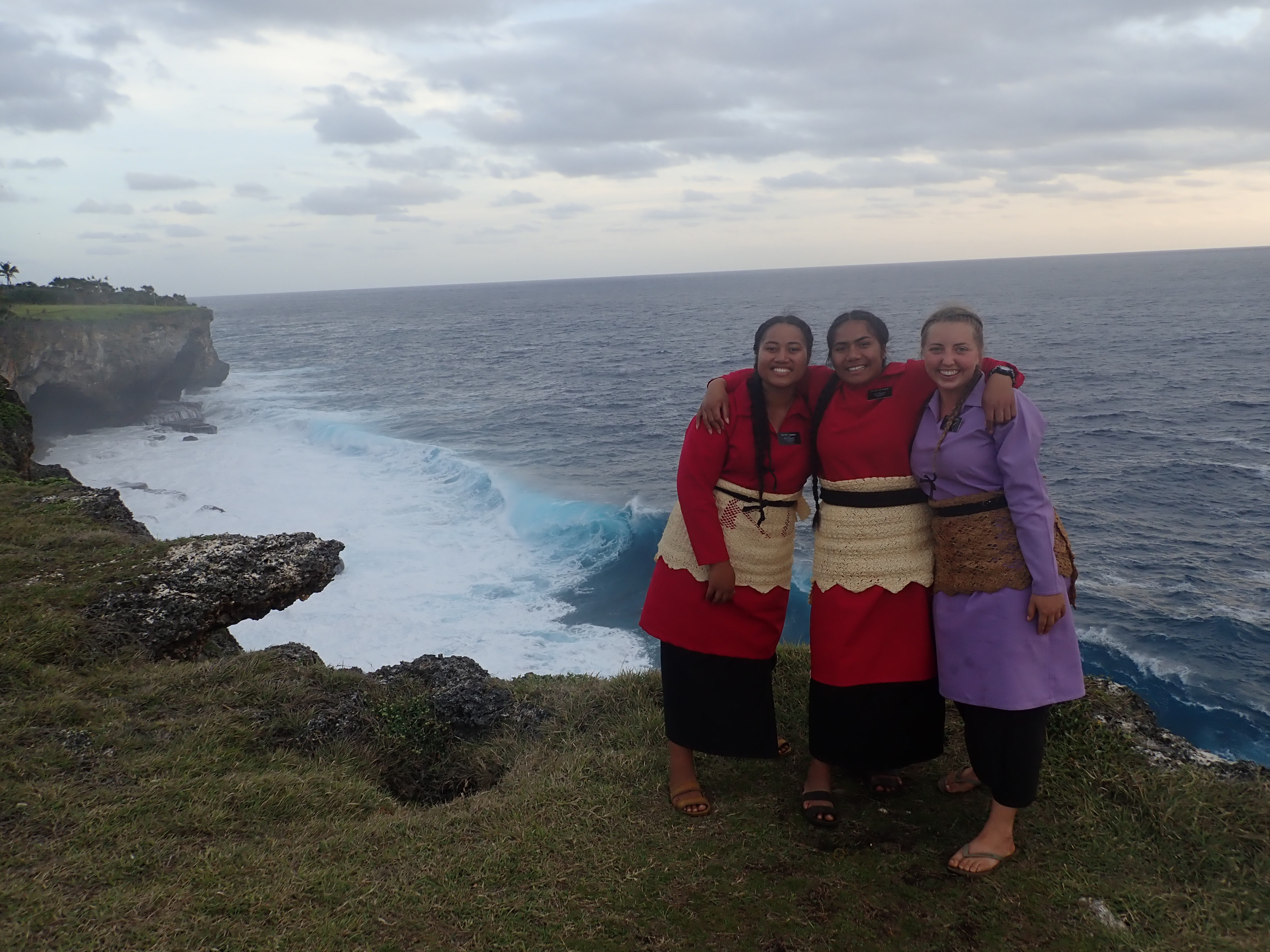
Missionaries wearing traditional woven mats - called ta'ovala.

Women cooking topai for mourners.

Humans have lived in Tonga for nearly 3,000 years since settlement in late Lapita times. Before the arrival of European explorers in the late 17th and early 18th centuries, Tongans had frequent contacts with their nearest Oceanic neighbours, Fiji and Niue. In the 19th century, with the arrival of Western traders and missionaries, Tongan culture changed, especially in religion. As of 2013, almost 98% of residents profess Christianity. The people discarded some old beliefs and habits and adopted others.

=== Fahu ===
Fahu is a form of social organization practiced by the people of Tonga, built upon a relationship between a person and their father's sister and paternal cousins. There are a few key superiorities in the social structure of fahu:

1. One's paternal side is superior to their maternal side of a family unit, and
2. Sisters are situated as superordinate and sacred counterparts to their brothers, thus
3. The sister of one's father is the highest ranking family member

Prior to Western contact, the inner dynamics between the chiefly kinship groups were governed by this social convention. Although fahu rights do not hold the same political strength and implications they historically did, they remain, to a notable degree, a part of the contemporary social practices in Tonga.

==== Socio-environmental impact of fahu ====
Similar social structures to fahu have been cited as significantly beneficial for human adaptation to environmental threats, especially those situated in hurricane-prone regions such as Tonga. The benefit stems from the fahu's ability to provide a network and capacity to allow for relocation of people and resources during environmental events, such as hurricanes or droughts.

However, there have been environmental consequences of note due to the fahu structure, or rather, a disturbance of the structure. In the 1980s, Tonga saw a severe depletion of its sandalwood tree due to a disruption of the fahu social hierarchy, which was incited by market demand for the resource. This led to heightened local competition and eventually an overharvest of the tree. Nearly all of the sandalwood resources were depleted over the span of two years.

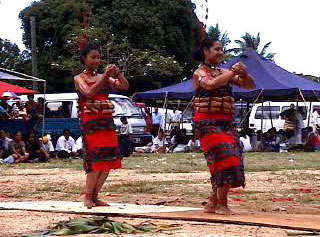
The start of a Tongan tauʻolunga dance

=== Sport ===
==== Rugby union ====
Rugby union is the national sport, and the national team (ʻIkale Tahi, or Sea Eagles) has succeeded internationally. Tonga has competed in six Rugby World Cups since 1987. The 2007 and 2011 Rugby World Cups were Tonga's most successful to date, both winning two out of four matches and in a running chance for the quarterfinals. In the 2007 Rugby World Cup, Tonga won its first two matches, against the USA 25–15, and Samoa 19–15. They came very close to upsetting the eventual winners of the 2007 tournament, the South African Springboks, losing 30–25. A defeat by England, 36–20 in their last pool game ended their hopes of making the knockout stages. Nevertheless, by picking up third place in their pool games behind South Africa and England, Tonga earned automatic qualification for the 2011 Rugby World Cup in New Zealand. In Pool A of the 2011 Rugby World Cup, Tonga beat both Japan 31–18 and 5th ranked eventual finalist France 19–14 in the latter pool stages. However, a previous heavy defeat by the All Blacks at the tournament's opener (41–10) and a subsequent tight defeat by Canada (25–20) meant that Tonga lost out to France (who also lost to NZ) for the quarter finals due to 2 bonus points and a points difference of 46.

Tonga's best result before 2007 came in 1995, when they beat Côte d'Ivoire 29–11, and 1999 when they beat Italy 28–25 (although with only 14 men they lost heavily to England, 101–10). Tonga perform the Ikale Tahi war dance or Sipi Tau (a form of Kailao) before all their matches. Tonga used to compete in the Pacific Tri-Nations against Samoa and Fiji, which has now been replaced by the World Rugby Pacific Nations Cup, which now involves Japan, Canada, and the United States. At club level, there are the Datec Cup Provincial Championship and the Pacific Rugby Cup. Rugby union is governed by the Tonga Rugby Football Union, which was a member of the Pacific Islands Rugby Alliance and contributed to the Pacific Islanders rugby union team, before they were disbanded in 2009.

Many players of Tongan descent – e.g., Jonah Lomu, Israel Folau, Viliami "William" ʻOfahengaue, Malakai Fekitoa, Ben Afeaki, Charles Piutau, Frank Halai, Sekope Kepu, George Smith, Wycliff Palu, Sitaleki Timani, Salesi Ma'afu, Anthony and Saia Fainga'a, Mark Gerrard, Cooper Vuna, Doug Howlett, Toutai Kefu and Tatafu Polota-Nau – have played for either the All Blacks or the Wallabies. British and Irish Lion and Welsh international player Taulupe "Toby" Faletau is Tongan born and the son of Tongan international Kuli Faletau. Taulupe's cousins and England international players Billy and Mako Vunipola (who is also a British and Irish Lion), are sons of former Tonga rugby captain Fe'ao Vunipola. Rugby is popular among the nation's schools, and students from schools such as Tonga College and Tupou College are regularly offered scholarships in New Zealand, Australia and Japan.

==== Rugby league ====
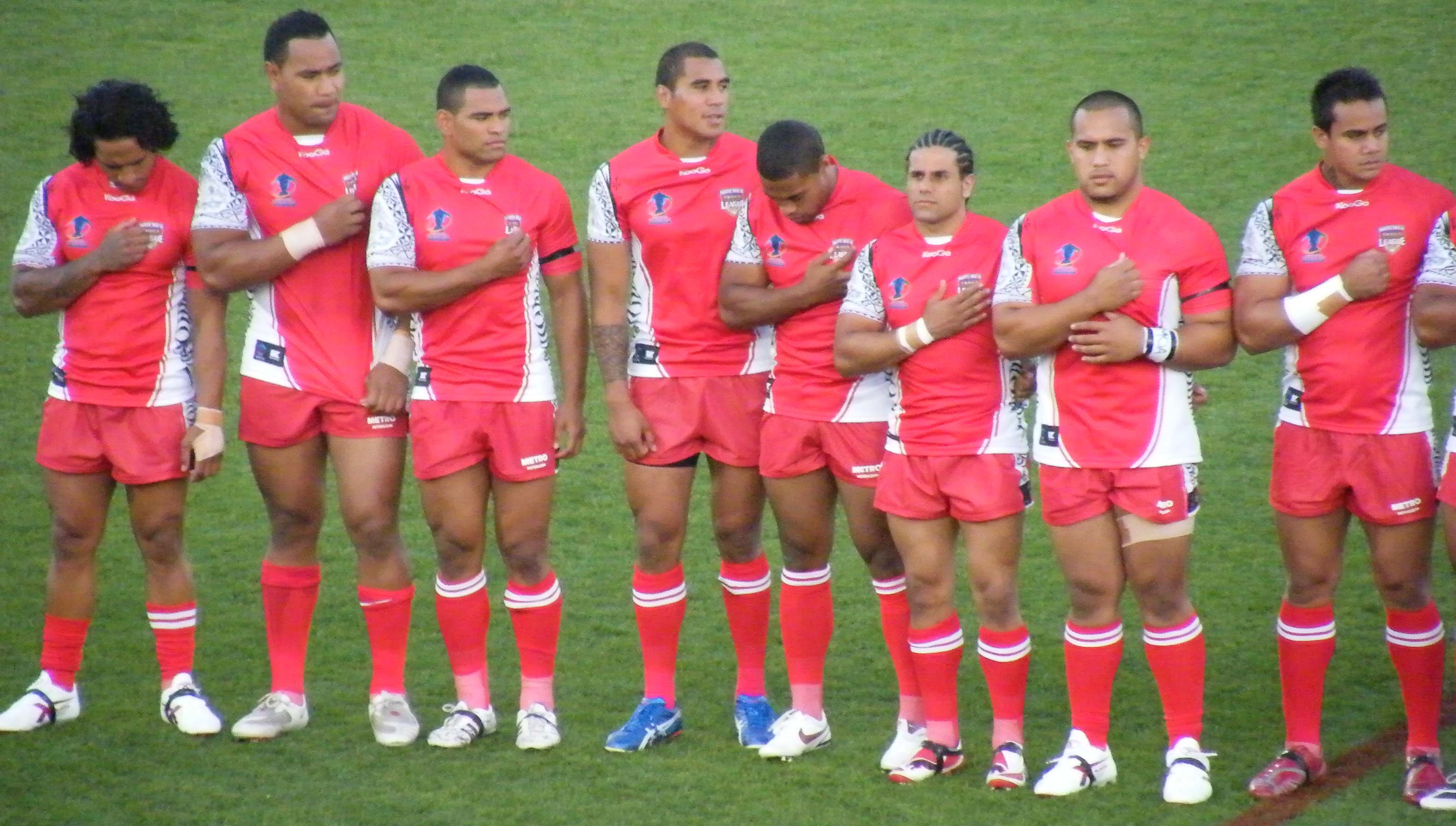
The Tongan rugby league team

Tonga National Rugby League team represents Tonga on the international stage. Tonga made their first appearance at a Rugby League World Cup in the 1995 edition where they went out in the first stage but narrowly lost to New Zealand. They have since appeared in each subsequent Rugby League World Cup tournament. In the 2008 Rugby League World Cup Tonga recorded wins against Ireland and Scotland. Just before the 2017 World Cup, various high-profile players, led by Jason Taumalolo and Andrew Fifita, defected from their tier one nations to represent their nation of heritage. This led to them defeating New Zealand in Hamilton at Waikato Stadium on 11 November at that tournament. The national team has since also recorded victories against Great Britain and the world number one Australia. In addition to the success of the national team, many players of Tongan descent make it big in the Australian National Rugby League competition. These include Jason Taumalolo, Israel Folau, Tyson Frizell, Tevita Pangai Junior, Konrad Hurrell, David Fusitua, Tuimoala Lolohea, Sio Siua Taukeiaho, Jorge Taufua, William Hopoate, Andrew Fifita, Ben Murdoch-Masila, Felise Kaufusi, Willie Mason, Manu Vatuvei, Brent Kite, Fuifui Moimoi, Willie Tonga, Anthony Tupou, Antonio Kaufusi, Michael Jennings, Tony Williams, Feleti Mateo. Subsequently, some Tongan rugby league players have established successful careers in the Super League such as Antonio Kaufusi.

==== Olympics ====
Aside from rugby, Tonga has also produced athletes who have competed at both the Summer and Winter Olympics. Tonga's only Olympic medal came from the 1996 Summer Olympics in Atlanta, where Paea Wolfgramm won silver in super heavyweight boxing. One athlete, Pita Taufatofua, attended the 2018 Winter Olympics in Pyeongchang, South Korea.

==== American football ====
Several Tongans have been football players in the National Football League, including Naufahu Tahi, Tuineau Alipate, Sione Takitaki, Spencer Folau, Lakei Heimuli, Steve Kaufusi, Ma'ake Kemoeatu, Deuce Lutui, Siupeli Malamala, Tim Manoa, Stan Mataele, Vili Maumau, Alfred Pupunu, Vai Sikahema, Star Lotulelei, Kalani Sitake, Vita Vea, Talanoa Hufanga, Peter Tuipulotu, Marlon Tuipulotu, and Tuli Tuipulotu.

=== Media ===
- Matangi Tonga – online newspaper
- Taimi o Tonga (Times of Tonga) – controversial newspaper
- Keleʻa – newspaper
- Talaki – newspaper
- Kalonikali – newspaper
- Tauʻataina – newspaper
- Kakalu – newspaper
- Tonga Broadcasting Commission (Television Tonga, Television Tonga 2, Radio Tonga 1, Radio Tonga 2 – Kool 90FM, 103FM)

=== Contemporary Tongan art ===
There has been a huge surge of contemporary Tongan artists in the past decade, the majority based in New Zealand. Tanya Edwards works with ngatu (bark cloths), Benjamin Work, Telly Tuita, and Sione Monū are widely exhibited internationally, Sēmisi Fetokai Potauaine built a five-storey Tongan sculpture in central Christchurch. In 2023, Bergman Gallery hosted Tukufakaholo, Tongan Contemporary in Auckland, New Zealand, featuring eight Tongan artists.

== See also ==
- Outline of Tonga
- List of islands and towns in Tonga
