= Kolonga =

Tongan village

Coordinates: 21°08′S 175°04′W

Kolonga is a village and the most populated settlement located on the northeast coast of Tongatapu in the Hahake District, Kingdom of Tonga. Kolonga is a hereditary estate of Lord Nuku.

The current population of Kolonga was recorded in the Tonga 2006 Census as 1,199. Many people have left to go overseas for better opportunities. Many lands have been deserted or they leave it to the care of their relatives, sending money support back home. The majority of the residents owned two lands: one in town where they reside and one agricultural land in the bush.

Nearly 99% of the population are agricultural farmers, out of that population only 60% own some level of qualification to a degree. Only a few have government jobs, while the rest make money out of their farming supplies at Nuku'alofa, the capital city of Tonga.

== History ==
The name Kolonga did not exist till later on, there were two names that were known; Ualako (old residence home of Lord Nuku) and the name Mesimasi.

=== Estate history ===
Kolonga village has always been the home and land of Lord Nuku and his people since the installation of Ngata, Tu'i Kanokupolu. In 1875, when King Tupou I declared the Tongan Constitution, Lord Nuku was elevated from being an ancient chiefly titleholder to established hereditary noble.

The title, Nuku, has always been passed from the oldest brother to the youngest, not from father to son. Before King Tupou I left for war to Fiji, he entrusted, Lord Nuku Momoiangaha, to be the King’s Guard at the Royal Palace. When he returned, he was very upset to hear that Moimoiangaha had granted permission for a catholic church in his land. Therefore the title was stripped off.

The title landed among the children of Finauvalevale Finefeuiaki, the youngest brother. His son, Fatanitavake Finefeuiaki, was called to the title but he refused. He along with his sister, Tu’inavu Finefeuiaki, journeyed with Prince Henele Ma'afu 'o Tu'i Tonga to Lau Islands, Fiji. Than the title was bestowed to his brother, Lord Nuku Nehasi Finefeuiaki, since then the title went from father to son.

Lord Nuku Nehasi Finefeuiaki died leaving no male heir. Than the title went to his brother, Lord Nuku Sosaia Finefeuiaki and his son, Lord Nuku Pulu Finefeuiaki. After he died, the title returned to the descendant of Lord Nuku Nehasi Finefeuiaki. Not long after the matter was taken to court. The investigation revealed, Lord Nuku Makoni Kailahi, was a descendant through the female line in three generations. The Tongan Constitution ruled him out and the title reverted to the descendants of Lord Nuku Sosaia Finefeuiaki.

There was also a dispute over the title during the time of Lord Nuku Penisimani Katavake Naufahu Finefeuiaki. Sione Vao (Illegitimate descendant of Fatanitavake Finefeuiaki) and his relatives arrive from Fiji to claim the title. The Tongan Constitution already ruled them out, due to his ancestor, Fatanitavake, signed away his birthright.

=== Origin of the name ===
One historical interpretation is that Kolonga was, at one time, a collection of huts. Kolonga got its name during the battle between the people from the Hahake and Hihifo District of Tongatapu during the Tu'i Tonga Empire. As the Hihifo people were winning the battle, the Hahake people retreated and escaped to the middle of the Hahake District. The Hihifo District people found the large hut, the people hiding in it and they burnt the hut down. As the people were crying, a Chief’s Representative (Talking Chief) Nifofa was coming from Nautoka and he asked a person, “What is that sound coming from?” the person answered, “Koe kolo ‘oku nga, ‘uhinga koe kolo ‘oku tangi”, translating “The town is weeping meaning the town is crying”. Once the large hut was burned down, the battle was over and everyone return to the villages where they came from. Therefore, the village was named Kolonga.

It is also said; the name Kolonga also had its origin from the Kanokupolu village, Hihifo District of Tongatapu and the Three Heads (‘Ulutolu). When Ngata was first crowned Tu’i Kanokupolu by the rebel people, he sat on the sia beneath the koka tree in the middle and both Niukapu and Nuku sat on the ground known as Kolonga.

=== Other names for Kolonga ===
The metaphoric reference to Kolonga is Lotopoha, Sialehaevala and 'Utulongoa'a.

Sialehaevale (gardenia; torn clothes), originated when Tu'i Tonga Fefine arrived in Kolonga and climbed up the gardenia tree. As she climbed up the tree to pick a flower, her clothes torn apart, this gave rise to the name.

'Utulongoa'a (shore/cliff; noisy) Kolonga was that loud and noisy during the night, the Tu'i Tonga Fefine couldn’t sleep. She grew tired of the noise that it turned out, the sound of the waves keep on crashing against the cliffs. This is another possible reason, the capital Heketa was moved to Mu'a by Tu'i Tonga at a later date.

== Tongan proverb ==
The word Kolonga features in the Tongan proverb, Ala-i-sia-ala-i-Kolonga (Mahina 2004), translated as, skillful at the mound, skillful at the hut. This indigenous proverb derived its meaning from the pigeon trappers’ practice of heu lupe, the snaring of pigeons. The mound on which the pigeons were trapped was called sia, and the temporary huts where the men resided and stored the captured pigeons were called kolonga. The proverb in vernacular language would be written as, Ala 'i sia, ala 'i kolonga. The meaning thus paid tribute to the trapper who was not merely skillful in snaring pigeons, but also skillful at storing and preserving the birds. The proverb referred to individuals who possessed the ability to successfully function in multiple contexts, a trait held in high regard by early Tongans. Relevant to the village characteristic of Kolonga and present day descendants, the proverb captured an element of wisdom known to the early Tongans. That is, humans have greater success at surviving if they are adaptable, skillful and functional in more than one environment.

== Commercial area ==
Kolonga has small numbers of shops and sometimes special events occur at Free Wesleyan Church of Tonga or the LDS Church. Kolonga features the following landmarks:

- The Cinema of Finefeuiaki; where all the special events are held such as traditional dances, birthdays and celebration events.
- Kolonga Community Health Centre (Kolonga Hospital)
- The Hall of Talikaepau Club
- Mo'unga'olive College
- The Library of Mo'unga'olive College

== Transport ==
According to Tonga 2006 Census, the most common way of getting to work at Nuku'alofa and back, was by car (87%) and public transport (13%).

== Schools ==
There's one private college known as Mo'unga'olive College, is run and owned by the Free Wesleyan Church of Tonga. And one government school known as Kolonga Government Public School (GPS).

== Churches ==
There are seven distinctive churches in Kolonga;

- The Church of Jesus Christ of Latter-day Saints
- Free Wesleyan Church of Tonga
- Roman Catholic Church
- Free Church of Tonga
- Church of Tonga
- Assembly of God
- Seventh-day Adventist Church of Tonga

== Lord Nuku and his descendant ==
Lord Nuku's bloodline had descended into more than twenty traditional chiefly titleholders, eventually reaching to Tu'i Tonga Laufilitonga, Tu'i Pelehake Filiaipulotu, Tui Lau and Tui Nayau of Fiji and the House of Tupou.

=== Royals ===
- King George Tupou II. Through his paternal grandfather Tu'i Pelehake Filiaipulotu and maternal grandmother Fifita Vava'u, he is a descendant of Tangikinatofetofe, daughter of Lord Nuku Hape
- Queen Sālote Tupou III. Through her mother, Queen Lavinia Veiongo, she is a descendant of Lord Ve'ehala (Lord of Fahefa) and Tangikinatofetofe, daughter of Lord Nuku Hape.
- Queen Halaevalu Mataʻaho ʻAhomeʻe, she is the queen mother of King Tupou VI. Through her mother, Heu'ifanga Veikune, she is descendant of Tangikinatofetofe, daughter of Lord Nuku Hape
- King Tupou IV, King of Tonga and oldest son of Queen Sālote Tupou III.
- King George Tupou V, King of Tonga and oldest son of King Tupou IV.
- King Tupou VI, is the current King of Tonga and the grandson of Queen Sālote Tupou III
- Queen Nanasipau'u Tuku'aho (8 March 1954), she is the current Queen of Tonga and the consort of King Tupou VI. Through her mother, Baroness Tuputupu Vaea, she is a descended of Lord Ma'afu (Finau Filimoe'ulie) of Vaini, the illegitimate son of Lord Nuku Moimoiangaha Finefeuiaki and Taufa Hoamofaleono (mother of King Tupou I)
- Princess Lātūfuipeka Tukuʻaho, daughter of King Tupou VI and Queen Nanasipau'u Tuku'aho, she is the current High Commissioner to Australia
- Crown Prince Tupoutoʻa ʻUlukalala (17 September 1985), eldest son of King Tupou VI and Queen Nanasipau'u Tuku'aho
- Prince Taufaʻahau Manumataongo - Taufaʻahau Manumataongo Tukuʻaho (born 10 May 2013, Auckland). Oldest son of Crown Prince Tupouto'a 'Ulukalala and Princess Sinaitakala Fakafanua.
- Princess Sinaitakala Fakafanua, through her father, Lord Fakafanua of Maufanga, she is a descendant of Tangikinatofetofe, daughter of Lord Nuku Hape.
- Prince Ata, second son of King Tupou VI and Queen Nanasipau'u Tuku'aho

=== Lords ===
- Lord Ma'atu of Niua (Fatafehi ʻAlaivahamamaʻo Tukuʻaho), older brother of King Tupou VI and the grandson of Queen Salote Tupou III
- Lord Nuku of Kolonga (Stanmore Valevale). He is the only child and son of Lord Nuku Finauvalevale Finefeuiaki
- Lord 'Ahome'e of Ha'avakatolo (Viliami Tu'i'oetau 'Ahome'e). The first son of Tangikina Valevale, daughter of Lord Nuku Stanmore Valevale. His also descendant from Tangikinatofetofe through his father, Lord 'Ahome'e (Tevita Vuna Tu'i 'o e Tau)
- Pavel Takangamoe Mafi 'Ahome'e, second son of Lord 'Ahome'e (Tevita Vuna Tu'i 'o e Tau) and Tangikina Valevale of Kolonga
- Lavinia Veiongo Latuniua 'Ahome'e, daughter of Lord 'Ahome'e (Tevita Vuna Tu'i 'o e Tau) and Tangikina Valevale of Kolonga
- Lord Tupouto'a Sione Mateialona (1852 - 15 September 1925). He was the fifth prime minister of Tonga from January 1905 - 30 September 1912. Through his mother, Veisinia Moalapau'u, he descendant from Tangikinatofetofe, daughter of Lord Nuku Hape
- Tupou Veiongo Moheofo. The daughter of Tu'i Kanokupolu Mumui and Tulehu'afaikikava. Through her mother, Tulehu'afaikikava, she is the grand daughter of Lord Ve'ehala and Tangikinatofetofe, daughter of Lord Nuku Hape
- Tu'i Tonga Laufilitonga, son of Tupou Veiongo Moheofo and Tu'i Tonga Fuanunuiava
- Lord Kalaniuvalu Fotofili of Lapaha and Niua (Tepuiti Tupoulahi Mailefihi Fatuilangi Ngalu Mo’etutulu) (born 1975). Through his ancestor, Tu'i Tonga Laufilitonga, he is a descendant of Tangikinatofetofe, daughter of Lord Nuku Hape
- Lord 'Ulukalala Ata (Siaosi Tangata-ʻo-Haʻamea) of Vava'u and Kolovai, through his ancestor, Tu'i Tonga Laufilitonga, he is a descendant of Tangikinatofetofe, daughter of Lord Nuku Hape
- Lord Tuita of 'Utungake. He descendant from Tangikinatofetofe, through two ancestors, Lord Tuita Siaosi 'Ulukivaiola and Viliami Vilai Tupou
- Lord Veikune, through his ancestor, Tupoutu'a Lamanukilupe, he is descendant of Tangikinatofetofe, daughter of Lord Nuku Hape
- Lord Tu'iha'ateiho, he is descendant from Lord Vaha'ifefeka, son of Lord Nuku'ulutolu. And also descended from Tangikinatofetofe, daughter of Lord Nuku Hape.
- Lord Vaea of Houma, descendant from Lord Ma'afu (Finau Filimoe'ulie), son of Lord Nuku Moimoiangaha Finefeuiaki and Taufa Hoamofaleono. And descendant of Tangikinatofetofe, through his grandfather, Viliami Vilai Tupou
- Lord Tu'i Pelehake (Viliami Tupoulahi Mailefihi Tukuʻaho), through his both ancestors, Tu'i Tonga Laufilitonga and Lord Tu'i Pelehake Filiaipulotu, he is a descendant of Tangikinatofetofe, daughter of Lord Nuku Hape
- Lord Fakafanua of Maufanga. He descendant of Tangikinatofetofe, through three ancestors, Lord Tu'i Pelehake Filiaipulotu, Lord Tuita Siaosi 'Ulukivaiola and Queen Lavinia Veiongo.
- Lord Vaha'i of Fo'ui. He is a descendant of Lord Vaha'ifefeka, youngest son of Lord Nuku'ulutolu. He is also descended from Tangikinatofetofe, through three ancestors, Lord Tu'i Pelehake Filiaipulotu, Lord Tuita Siaosi 'Ulukivaiola and Queen Lavinia Veiongo.
- Lord Ma'afu of Vaini, descendant of Lord Ma'afu (Finau Filimoe'ulie), illegitimate son of Lord Nuku Moimoiangaha Finefeuiaki and Taufa Hoamofaleono. He descendant from Tangikinatofetofe, through three ancestors, Lord Tu'i Pelehake Filiaipulotu, Lord Tuita Siaosi 'Ulukivaiola and Queen Lavinia Veiongo.
- Lord Fielakepa of Haveluloto, descendant from Mele Tangakina Finefeuiaki, daughter of Lord Nuku Sosaia Finefeuiaki. And also descendant from Tangikinatofetofe, through his ancestor, Tu'i Tonga Laufilitonga
- Lord Ve'ehala (Toluhama'a Tungi Vi) of Fahefa. He descendant from Tangikinatofetofe, through two ancestors, Lord Ve'ehala (Hoko'ila Ata) and Lord Tuita Siaosi 'Ulukivaiola
- Lord Fakatulolo of Falevai, Vava'u, descendant of No'otapa'ingatu, daughter of Te'ehalakamu Finefeuiaki, natural son of Lord Nuku Finefeuiaki
- Lord Tu'i'afitu (Lolomana'ia Tu'i'afitu). Through his mother, 'Uhingaevalu'a Lapeti, he is a descendant from Tangikinatofetofe, daughter of Lord Nuku Hape
- Lord Tu'iha'angana, he descendant from Tangikinatofetofe, daughter of Lord Nuku Hape

=== Notable people of Kolonga Ancestry ===
- Chief Tu'itufu of 'Eueiki, descendant of Havea Tu'anuku, son of Lord Nuku Hape
- Chief Momotu, descendant of Papa, daughter of Lord Nukufo'iva'e.
- Chief Tamale of Niutoua, descendant of Chief Siosifa Tamale and Kalolaine, daughter of Lord Nuku Moimoiangaha Finefeuiaki
- Chief Kapukava of Holonga. Through his mother, Mele 'Otufelenite, he descendant from Mo'unga'ulufeholoi'olotopoha, daughter of Lord Nuku Moimoiangaha Finefeuiaki. Also descendant from Tangikinalahi, daughter of Lord Nuku Hape.
- Ratu Sir Kamisese Mara (6 May 1920 – 18 April 2004), the founding father of modern nation Fiji and he once served as a chief minister, prime minister and president of Fiji. He was also the hereditary paramount chief of the Lau Islands, Fiji. Two titles were bestowed upon him: Tui Lau and Tui Nayau. Through his mother, he descendant from Tu’inavu, daughter of Finauvalevale Finefeuiaki, son of Lord Nuku Finefeuiaki
- Adi Ateca Moce Ganilau (born 1951), is a Fijian public figure. She is the oldest daughter of Ratu Sir Kamisese Mara
- Adi Koila Mara Nailatikau, a lawyer who served as a diplomat and politician; current First Lady of Fiji. She is the second daughter of Ratu Sir Kamisese Mara
- Ratu Alifereti Finau Mara (born 1960), a politician, lawyer and diplomat. He is the oldest son of Ratu Kamisese Mara
- Ratu Tevita Kapaiwai Lutunauga Uluilakeba Mara, a Fijian soldier who later succeeded from being an army chief to a becoming a colonel. He is the second son of Ratu Kamisese Mara
- Ratu Sir Edward Tuivanuavou Tugi Cakobau (21 December 1908 - 26 June 1973), Fijian chief and statesman. Through his father, King Tupou II, he is a descendant of Tangikinatofetofe, daughter of Lord Nuku Hape
- Ratu Epeli Nailatikau (born 5 July 1941), the current President of Fiji since 2009. The second son of Ratu Sir Edward Tuivanuavou Tugi Cakobau. Through his mother, he is descendant from Tu'inavu, daughter of Finauvalevale Finefeuiaki, son of Lord Nuku Finefeuiaki
- Ratu Tu'uakitau Cokanauto, Cabinet Minister. The third son of Ratu Sir Edward Tuivanuavou Tugi Cakobau. Through his mother, he is descendant from Tu'inavu, daughter of Finauvalevale Finefeuiaki, son of Lord Nuku Finefeuiaki
- Lord Sevele of Vailahi (1944 – present), was the thirteenth prime minister of Tonga from 30 March 2006 – 22 December 2012. He earned Bachelor of Science/Maths, Bachelor of Arts, master's degrees and Ph.D in Economic Geography
- 'Akilisi Pohiva, is a Tongan politician and a leader of the country's pro-democracy movement. He was a Minister of Health from 4 January 2011 – 13 January 2011. He is a descendant of Lord Nuku Moimoiangaha Finefeuiaki.
- Sione Finefeuiaki, is a rugby league footballer in Australia. his The son of Sione 'Ofa Finefeuiaki, son of Lord Nuku Penisimani Katavake Naufahu Finefeuiaki
- Douglas Charles Howlett, a rugby player, from 2000 – 2007 he played for New Zealand and represent them at 62 All Black International Caps.
