= Tukuʻaho (surname) =

Tukuʻaho is a surname. Notable people with the surname include:

- Fatafehi 'Alaivahamama'o Tuku'aho (1954–2004), Tongan Prince
- Nanasipauʻu Tukuʻaho (born 1954), Queen of Tonga
- Princess Lātūfuipeka Tukuʻaho (born 1983), Tongan royal
- Salote Maumautaimi Tuku'aho (born 1991), Tongan royal
- Siaosi Tukuʻaho, Tongan politician
- Sitiveni Tuku'aho (born 1990), Tongan Prince
- Viliami Tupoulahi Mailefihi Tukuʻaho (1957–2014), Tongan politician
- Tuku'aho, 14th Tu’I Kanokupolu of Tonga
