= Succession to the Tongan throne =

Line of succession

The order of succession to the throne of Tonga is laid down in the 1875 constitution. The crown descends according to male-preference cognatic primogeniture. Only legitimate descendants through the legitimate line of King George Tupou I's son and grandson, Crown Prince Tēvita ʻUnga and Prince ʻUelingatoni Ngū, are entitled to succeed. A person loses their right of succession and deprives their descendants of their right of succession if they marry without the monarch's permission.

== Line of succession ==
The current line of succession is as follows:

- King Tāufaʻāhau Tupou IV (1918–2006)
  - King George Tupou V (1948–2012)
  - Prince Fatafehi 'Alaivahamama'o Tuku'aho (1954–2004), removed from the line of succession in 1980 after marrying a commoner
    - Prince Tungi (b. 1990)
    - Salote Maumautaimi Haim Hadessah Ber Yardena ‘Alanuanua Tuku’aho (b. 1991)
    - Fatafehi Sione Ikamafana Ta’anekinga ‘o Tonga Tuku'aho (b. 1994)
    - ‘Etani Ha’amea Tupoulahi Tu’uakitau Ui Tu’alangi Tuku’aho (b. 1995)
  - King Tupou VI (born 1959)
    - (1) The Crown Prince, Tupoutoʻa ʻUlukalala (b. 1985)
      - (2) Prince Taufaʻahau Manumataongo (b. 2013)
      - (3) Princess Halaevalu Mataʻaho (b. 2014)
      - (4) Princess Nanasipau’u Eliana (b. 2018)
      - (5) Princess Salote Mafile'o Pilolevu (b. 2021)
    - (6) The Prince Ata (b. 1988)
    - (7) Princess Angelika Lātūfuipeka Tukuʻaho (b. 1983)
  - (8) Princess Salote Mafile'o Pilolevu Tuita, Lady Tuita (b. 1951)
    - (9) Sālote Lupepau'u Salamasina Purea Vahine Arii 'Oe Hau Tuita (b. 1977)
      - (10) Phaedra Anaseini Tupouveihola Ikaleti Olo-'i-Fangatapu Fusituʻa (b. 2003)
    - (11) Titilupe Fanetupouvava'u Tuita Tu'ivakano (b. 1978)
      - (12) Simon Tu'iha'atu'unga George Ma'ulupekotofa Tu'ivakano (b. 2011)
      - (13) Michaela Tu'ivakano (b. 2012)
      - (14) Fatafehi Tu'ivakano (b. 2013)
    - (15) Frederica Lupe'uluiva Fatafehi 'o Lapaha Tuita Filipe (b. 1983)
      - (16) Latu'alaifotu'aika Fahina e Paepae Tian Tian Filipe (b. 2014)
    - (17) Lupeolo Halaevalu Moheofo Virginia Rose Tuita (b. 1986)
