= Nalesoni Laifone =

Crown Prince of Tonga
- Tenure: 11 March 1885 – 6 June 1889
- Predecessor: ʻUelingatoni Ngū
- Successor: Fusipala Taukiʻonetuku
- Monarch: George Tupou I
- Born: c. 1859
- Died: 6 June 1889 (aged 29–30); Neiafu, Vavaʻu
- Burial: 17 June 1889; God's Acre at Vavaʻu
- Spouse: Luseane Angaʻaefonu
- House: House of Tupou
- Father: Tēvita ʻUnga
- Mother: Fifita Vavaʻu

Nalesoni Laifone or Nelson Laifone (c. 1859 – 6 June 1889) was the third Crown Prince of Tonga from 1885 to 1889. He died before succeeding to the throne.

== Life ==
Born in 1859, he was the youngest child and second son of Tēvita ʻUnga and Fifita Vavaʻu, the second daughter of Liufau, Tuʻi Haʻangana Ngata, and his second wife, Hulita Tuʻifua. Although his paternal grandfather Tāufaʻāhau had become King George Tupou I of a united Tonga in 1845, Laifone's father was considered illegitimate by Christian standard because he was born to a secondary consort. After the death of his uncle Vuna Takitakimālohi, his father ʻUnga was legitimized and named Crown Prince under the terms of the first written constitution of Tonga on 4 November 1875. The line of succession outlined in the constitution placed Laifone behind his father and elder brother ʻUelingatoni Ngū and before his sister Fusipala Taukiʻonetuku and her descendants. The early deaths of his father in 1879 and his brother in 1885 left him as the heir apparent to the Tongan throne. He became the Crown Prince of Tonga on 11 March 1885. He also served as the governor of Vavaʻu from 1885 to 1889.

In 1881, Laifone visited Auckland, New Zealand, accompanied by Joine Tavo. During the visit, he was described as "about 6 feet 3 inches in height, well proportioned and regular featured". In 1886, a travelling correspondent from The New Zealand Herald interviewed the Prince:

The Crown Prince Laifoni [sic], grandson of the venerable King George, the heir apparent to his throne, a fine, full-faced, stout man, probably under 30 years of age, drove the preacher of the previous evening all through and around this capital city of Nukualofa. It amused the old gentleman, as he sat beside His Royal Highness, who was shoeless, and clad only with shirt and trowsers, jacket, and slouched straw hat, to listen to his broken English, as he replied to questions or spoke of his visits to Wellington and Auckland, the deepest impression and most cherished memory of which found expression in the oft-repeated exclamation, "Plenty of fun there!" His character seemed to lack depth and solidity. When he ascends the throne it will tax to the full the capacity, wisdom, and prudence (diplomatic tact) of the then Prime Minister to rein him in and prevent his kicking over the traces.

After few months of illness, Prince Laifone died on 6 June 1889, at Neiafu, the principal settlement on Vavaʻu. Gun salutes were fired and flags lowered to half-mast in the capital of Nukuʻalofa. Laifone was buried at God's Acre on Vavaʻu on 17 June 1889. A traveler, who visited the cemetery in 1890, commented, "The principal grave is that of the recently deceased Prince Laifoni [sic]. This occupies a cleared raised space, covered with sand, coral, and gravel, with a circle of black stones from the volcano of Tofoa. Fresh flowers are placed in glasses around the grave. As yet there is no headstone here." Predeceasing his grandfather, he left no legitimate issue by his wife, so the position of heir apparent fell on his sister, who held the status of heir apparent for two months before her own death. In 1889, King Tupou I's will stipulated: "Since Fusi is dead, who should have succeeded Laifone, then Tāufaʻāhau should inherit." By 1889, King Tupou I had outlived his two sons and three grandchildren leaving his great-grandson Tāufaʻāhau (Laifone's nephew) as the next Crown Prince who would succeed his great-grandfather in 1893 as George Tupou II.

== Marriage and issue ==
He married Luseane Angaʻaefonu (1871–1941), eldest daughter of ʻInoke Fotu and Princess Lavinia Veiongo Mahanga, also known as "Old Lavinia", the daughter of Laufilitonga, the 39th and last Tuʻi Tonga. This marriage produced no children, but he left two illegitimate daughters: Silia Tupou and Liliani Tuʻituʻivao Mafileʻo, who married ʻAlipate Tutae Tupoulahi Mafileʻo, a grandson of Tuʻi Vavaʻu Fīnau ʻUlukālala III ʻi Pouono, and had issue.

== Bibliography ==
- Biersack, Aletta (1996). Fox, James J.; Sather, Clifford (eds.). "Rivals and Wives: Affinal Politics and the Tongan Ramage". Origins, Ancestry and Alliance: Explorations in Austronesian Ethnography. Canberra: Department of Anthropology, Australian National University. doi:10.22459/OAA.10.2006. hdl:2027/mdp.39015041090880. ISBN 978-0-7315-2432-7. OCLC 245762652.
- Hixon, Margaret (2000). Sālote: Queen of Paradise. Dunedin, NZ: University of Otago Press. ISBN 978-1-877133-78-7. OCLC 247978391.
- Lavisse, Ernest; Gauvain, Auguste (1890). La Vie politique à l'étranger. Paris: G. Charpentier et Cie. OCLC 558432045.
- Rodman, Margaret (2007). House-girls Remember: Domestic Workers in Vanuatu. Honolulu: University of Hawaii Press. ISBN 978-0-8248-1856-2. OCLC 35760773.
- Rutherford, Noel (1977). Friendly Islands: A History of Tonga. Melbourne: Oxford University Press. ISBN 978-0-19-550519-1. OCLC 611102698.
- Vagabond (1890). Holy Tonga. Melbourne: d. OCLC 1322606.
- Wood-Ellem, Elizabeth (1999). Queen Sālote of Tonga: The Story of an Era 1900–1965. Auckland, N.Z: Auckland University Press. ISBN 978-0-8248-2529-4. OCLC 262293605.

Royal titles
Preceded by ʻUelingatoni Ngū	Crown Prince of Tonga; 1885–1889	Succeeded by Fusipala Taukiʻonetuku
