= Taufaʻahau =

Taufaʻahau is a given name. Notable people with the name include:

- Taufaʻahau Manumataongo (born 2013), Tongan royal
- Tāufaʻāhau Tupou IV (1918–2006), King of Tonga
