= List of monarchs of Tonga =

King of Tonga
- Coat of arms of Tonga

Incumbent
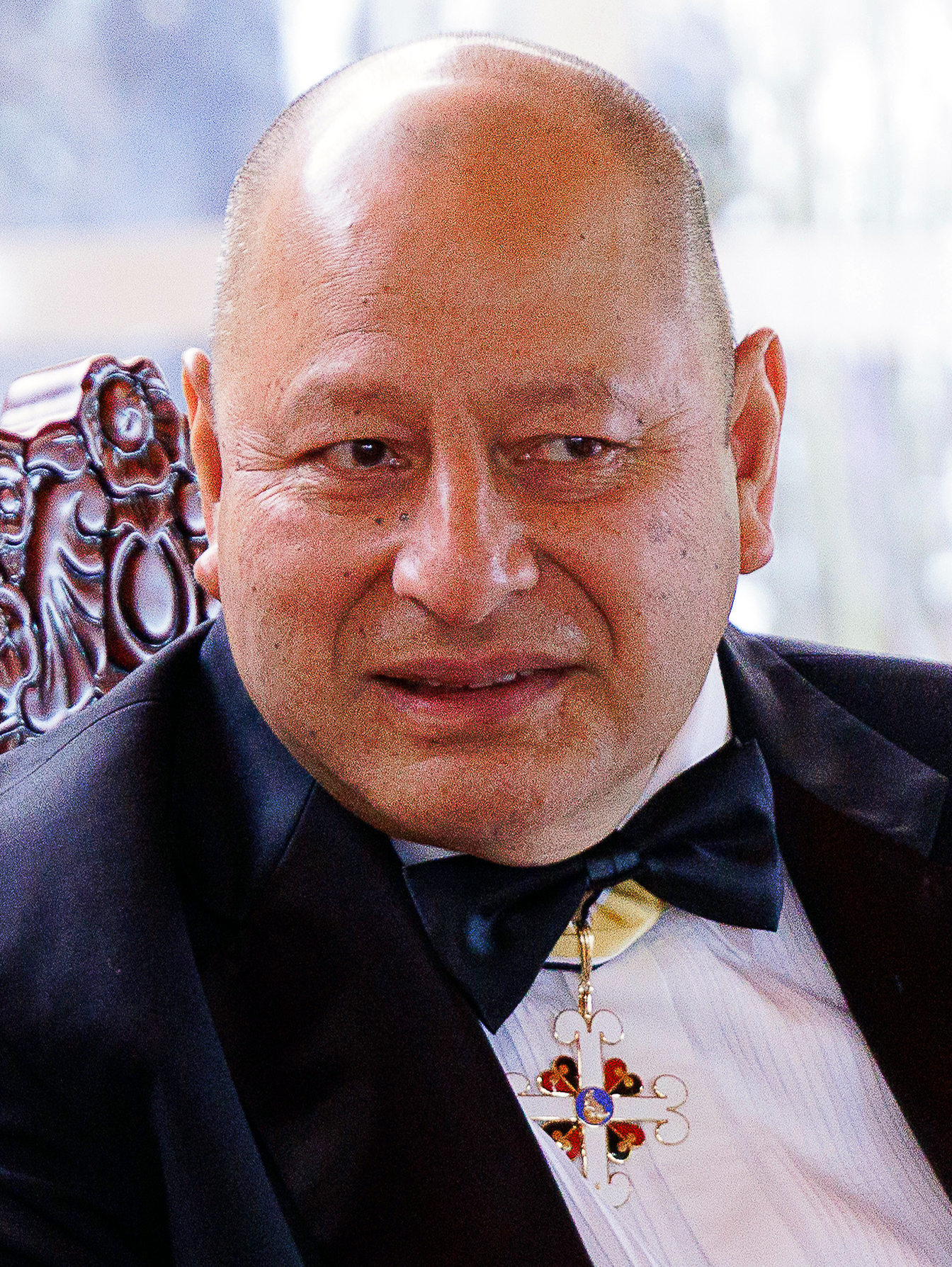
- Tupou VI since 18 March 2012

Details
- Style: His Majesty
- Heir apparent: Tupoutoʻa ʻUlukalala
- First monarch: George Tupou I
- Formed: 4 December 1845; 180 years ago
- Residences: Royal Palace, Nukuʻalofa

This is a list of monarchs of Tonga since 1845, after the Constitution of Tonga established the role of the monarch. The first constitutional monarch of Tonga was George Tupou I.

== History ==
Traditonally, the King of Tonga ruled as an absolute monarch with control over the executive, legislature and judiciary. He also was responsible for appointing the Attorney General of Tonga, the Commissioner of the Tonga Police and various other high ranking state positions. Predominantly relying on the Privy Council of Tonga for advice on legislation, with the Prime Minister of Tonga always being a member of the nobility until 2006. Fred Sevele, an elected member of the Legislative Assembly of Tonga became the first commoner appointed as Prime Minister in 2006.

During this time, there was a growing movement for political reform. Three days before his coronation on 1 August 2008, King George Tupou V announced that he would relinquish most of his powers and be guided by the Prime Minister's recommendations on most matters. The King declared that he would hand the majority of his political and executive power to the Prime Minister, but would retain a veto on legislation and retain the ability to appoint judges as well as the Royal prerogative of mercy.

== Budget allocation and privileges ==
The annual budget allocation to the monarchy is T$ 4,894,900 (c. US$2,116,799). All bats are officially the property of the king, and only members of the royal family are permitted to hunt them.

== Earlier monarchs of Tonga ==
Before Tonga was united, the following dynasties reigned:

- Tuʻi Tonga, rulers of Tonga from c. 950 to 9 December 1865, when the last Tu'i Tonga, HM Sanualio Fatafehi Laufilitonga, died.
- Tuʻi Haʻatakalaua, rulers of Tonga from c. 1470 to c. 1800.
- Tuʻi Kanokupolu, rulers of Tonga from c. 1500 to the present day. George Tupou I, the first constitutional monarch of Tonga, was the 19th Tuʻi Kanokupolu.

== Monarchs of Tonga since 1845 ==
Here is a list of Tongan monarchs since 1845:

Name	Lifespan	Reign start	Reign end	Notes	Family	Image
George Tupou I	4 December 1797 – 18 February 1893 (aged 95)	4 December 1845	18 February 1893	Son of Tupoutoʻa, 17th Tuʻi Kanokupolu	Tupou	George Tupou I of Tonga
George Tupou II	18 June 1874 – 5 April 1918 (aged 43)	18 February 1893	5 April 1918	Double Great-grandson of George Tupou I	Tupou	George Tupou II of Tonga
Sālote Tupou III	13 March 1900 – 16 December 1965 (aged 65)	5 April 1918	16 December 1965	Daughter of George Tupou II	Tupou	Sālote Tupou III of Tonga
Tāufaʻāhau Tupou IV	4 July 1918 – 10 September 2006 (aged 88)	16 December 1965	10 September 2006	Son of Sālote Tupou III	Tupou	Tāufaʻāhau Tupou IV of Tonga
George Tupou V	4 May 1948 – 18 March 2012 (aged 63)	11 September 2006	18 March 2012	Son of Tāufaʻahau Tupou IV	Tupou	George Tupou V of Tonga
Tupou VI	12 July 1959 (age 67)	18 March 2012	Incumbent	Son of Tāufaʻāhau Tupou IV Brother of George Tupou V	Tupou	Tupou VI of Tonga

== Royal standards ==
Royal standard of Tonga (1862–1875)

Royal standard of Tonga

== Family tree ==
Tupou family tree

Tuʻi Haʻatakalaua line	Tuʻi Tonga line	Tuʻi Kanokupolu line
Kalolaine Fusimatalili	George Tupou I	Fīnau Kaunanga
Fifita Vavʻau	Tēvita ʻUnga	Sālote Mafile‘o Pilolevu	Filiaipulotu
Fusipala Taukiʻonetuku	Fatafehi Toutaitokotaha
Lavinia Veiongo	George Tupou II	ʻAnaseini Takipō
Viliami Tungī Mailefihi	Sālote Tupou III	Vīlai Tupou (illegitimate son)	Tupou Seini
Tāufaʻāhau Tupou IV	Halaevalu Mataʻaho ʻAhomeʻe	Siaosi 'Alipate Tupou, Baron Vaea	Tuputupu Ma'afu-'o-Tukuialahi
George Tupou V	Tupou VI	Nanasipauʻu Tukuʻaho
ʻIlima Lei Fifita Tohi (illegitimate daughter)	Tupoutoʻa ʻUlukalala	Sinaitakala Fakafanua
Taufaʻahau Manumataongo

- Fox, James J.; Sather, Clifford (1996). Origins, Ancestry and Alliance: Explorations in Austronesian Ethnography. Canberra: Department of Anthropology, Australian National University. p. 252. ISBN 978-0-7315-2432-7. OCLC 245762652.
- Kaeppler, Adrienne Lois; D.C. (2008). The Pacific Arts of Polynesia and Micronesia. Oxford: Oxford University Press. p. 90. ISBN 978-0-19-284238-1. OCLC 236158882.
- Völkel, Svenja (2010). Social Structure, Space and Possession in Tongan Culture and Language: An Ethnolinguistic Study. Amsterdam; Philadelphia: John Benjamins Publishing. p. 45. ISBN 978-90-272-0283-3.
- Wood-Ellem, Elizabeth (1999). Queen Sālote of Tonga: The Story of an Era 1900-1965. Auckland, N.Z: Auckland University Press. p. front. ISBN 978-0-8248-2529-4. OCLC 262293605.

== See also ==
- Politics of Tonga
  - Prime Minister of Tonga
- Crown of Tonga
- Crown Prince of Tonga
- List of royal consorts of Tonga
- Succession to the Tongan throne
