= Vuna =

Vuna may refer to:

- Cooper Vuna (born 1987), rugby player
- Joseph Vuna (born 1998), rugby player
- Vuna Takitakimālohi (1844–1862), Prince of Tonga
