= Sinaitakala Fakafanua =

Sinaitakala
- Crown Princess of Tonga
- Sinaitakala in 2026
- Born: 20 March 1987 (age 39)
- Spouse: Tupoutoʻa ʻUlukalala, Crown Prince of Tonga (m. 2012)
- Issue: Prince Taufaʻahau Manumataongo; Princess Halaevalu Mataʻaho; Princess Nanasipauʻu Eliana; Princess Salote Mafile’o Pilolevu
Names
- Sinaitakala Tu'imatamoana 'i Fanakavakilangi Tuku'aho
- Father: Kinikinilau Tūtoatasi Fakafānua, 7th Lord Fakafānua
- Mother: Princess Sinaitakala ʻOfeina ʻe he Langi, Lady Fakafānua
- Religion: Methodism

Sinaitakala Tukuʻaho, Crown Princess of Tonga (née Sinaitakala Tu'imatamoana 'i Fanakavakilangi Fakafānua; 20 March 1987) is a member of the Tongan royal family and the wife of Crown Prince Tupoutoʻa ʻUlukalala, her second cousin, whom she married on 12 July 2012.

== Family ==
Princess Sinaitakala is the daughter of late Kinikinilau Tūtoatasi, 7th Lord Fakafānua and estate holder of Ma'ufanga, and Princess Sinaitakala ʻOfeina ʻe he Langi, Lady Fakafānua. She has two brothers, current 8th Lord Fakafānua, Fatafehi Kinikinilau Lolomānaʻia and Fakaola mei Langi ʻItafuaʻatonga Tūtoatasi Fakafānua.

Through her mother, she is a member of the Tongan royal family and, of her right, in line to the country's throne.

== Marriage ==
=== Controversy ===
The marriage caused controversy in Tonga, since Fakafānua and Crown Prince Tupoutoʻa ʻUlukalala are double second cousins. That is, her parents are each the first cousin of the King:

- Fakafanua's father is a son of Kalolaine Ahomeʻe, sister of Queen Mother Halaevalu (born Halaevalu Mataʻaho ʻAhomeʻe).
- Her mother, Princess Sinaitakala 'Ofeina, is the daughter of Prince Sione Ngū Manumataongo Uelingatoni Tukuʻaho (known as The Prince Fatafehi Tuʻipelehake), Prime Minister of Tonga (1965–1991) and a niece to King Tāufaʻāhau Tupou IV.

The wedding was opposed by some members of the royal family, reportedly due to the close genetic relationship of the couple. Most notable in opposition to the wedding was Hon. Frederica Filipe who took to the media and social media to voice opposition to the marriage.

=== Wedding ceremony ===
Sinaitakala Fakafanua married the Crown Prince at the Centenary Church of the Free Wesleyan Church of Tonga in Nuku'alofa on 12 July 2012. The wedding marked the first marriage of a Tongan crown prince in sixty-five years. Sinaitakala was 25 years old at the time of her wedding.

=== Family tree ===
Tupou family tree

Tuʻi Haʻatakalaua line	Tuʻi Tonga line	Tuʻi Kanokupolu line
Kalolaine Fusimatalili	George Tupou I	Fīnau Kaunanga
Fifita Vavʻau	Tēvita ʻUnga	Sālote Mafile‘o Pilolevu	Filiaipulotu
Fusipala Taukiʻonetuku	Fatafehi Toutaitokotaha
Lavinia Veiongo	George Tupou II	ʻAnaseini Takipō
Viliami Tungī Mailefihi	Sālote Tupou III	Vīlai Tupou (illegitimate son)	Tupou Seini
Tāufaʻāhau Tupou IV	Halaevalu Mataʻaho ʻAhomeʻe	Siaosi 'Alipate Tupou, Baron Vaea	Tuputupu Ma'afu-'o-Tukuialahi
George Tupou V	Tupou VI	Nanasipauʻu Tukuʻaho
ʻIlima Lei Fifita Tohi (illegitimate daughter)	Tupoutoʻa ʻUlukalala	Sinaitakala Fakafanua
Taufaʻahau Manumataongo

- Fox, James J.; Sather, Clifford (1996). Origins, Ancestry and Alliance: Explorations in Austronesian Ethnography. Canberra: Department of Anthropology, Australian National University. p. 252. ISBN 978-0-7315-2432-7. OCLC 245762652.
- Kaeppler, Adrienne Lois; D.C. (2008). The Pacific Arts of Polynesia and Micronesia. Oxford: Oxford University Press. p. 90. ISBN 978-0-19-284238-1. OCLC 236158882.
- Völkel, Svenja (2010). Social Structure, Space and Possession in Tongan Culture and Language: An Ethnolinguistic Study. Amsterdam; Philadelphia: John Benjamins Publishing. p. 45. ISBN 978-90-272-0283-3.
- Wood-Ellem, Elizabeth (1999). Queen Sālote of Tonga: The Story of an Era 1900-1965. Auckland, N.Z: Auckland University Press. p. front. ISBN 978-0-8248-2529-4. OCLC 262293605.

== Issue ==
Her son, Prince Taufaʻahau Manumataongo, was born on 10 May 2013 and is second in the line of succession to the Tongan throne, after his father. On 12 July 2014, the Crown Princess gave birth to a daughter, Princess Halaevalu Mataʻaho who is third in the line of succession. On 20 March 2018, her 31st birthday, Crown Princess Sinaitakala gave birth to her third child and second daughter, Princess Nanasipauʻu Eliana, at the Auckland City Hospital in New Zealand. On 25 February 2021, Crown Princess Sinaitakala gave birth to her fourth child and third daughter, Princess Salote Mafile’o Pilolevu, at the Calvary Hospital in Canberra.

== Honours ==
- (Kingdom of the Two Sicilies) Two Sicilian Royal Family: Dame Grand Cross of the Royal Order of Francis I
