= Faʻaoso =

Faʻaoso is a surname. Notable people with the surname include:

- Aaron Fa'aoso, Australian actor
- Lisiate Fa'aoso (born 1983), Tongan rugby union footballer
- Richard Fa'aoso (born 1984), Tonga rugby league footballer
