= ʻElisiva Fusipala Taukiʻonetuku =

Mother of King George Tupou II

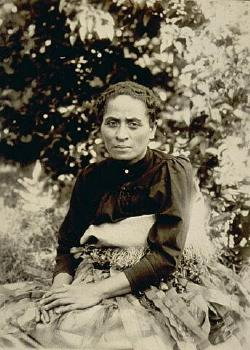
- Princess Fusipala in a photograph taken by Josiah Martin, c. 1885
- Born: 18 May 1850; Tonga
- Died: 2 September 1889 (39 years); Tonga
- Spouse: Siaʻosi Fatafehi Toutaitokotaha (1842–1912)
- Children: George Tupou II
- Parents: Tēvita ʻUnga (father); Fifita Vava'u (mother)

ʻElisiva Fusipala Taukiʻonetuku (18 May 1850 – 2 September 1889) was the mother of King George Tupou II of Tonga.

== Biography ==
Born to Tēvita ʻUnga and his first wife Fifita Vavaʻu, her father was, according to newly adopted Christian law, an illegitimate son of King George Tupou I because his mother was a secondary wife of the king. Her family's luck changed when the king's only legitimate son, Prince Vuna Takitakimālohi, died, leaving her father as King Tupou's heir.

She married her paternal first cousin Prince Siaʻosi Fatafehi Toutaitokotaha (1842–1912), the fourth Tuʻi Pelehake, grandson of Tupou I through his mother Princess Salote Pilolevu Mafileʻo, her aunt. They had one son, the future King George Tupou II. Her father died 1879, her elder brother ʻUelingatoni Ngū died childless in 1885 and the same fate befell her younger brother Nalesoni Laifone 1889. She became the heir to the throne after her last brother's death in 1889 and held the status of heir apparent for two months before her own death. Her son succeeded his great-grandfather in 1893. Thus the royal lineage passed through her. Her son's second daughter Princess ʻElisiva Fusipala Taukiʻonetuku was named after her.

In July 1865, English explorer Julius Brenchley visited Vavaʻu for five days and met governor ʻUnga and his family including Fusipala. Brenchley noted that she was "twelve years old, is strongly built, and has her breasts perfectly developed, as is usual in a country where the women are generally mothers before they are thirteen." However, Fusipala was actually fifteen at the time, being born in 1850, and not twelve as Brenchley claimed.

== Family tree ==
Tupou family tree

Tuʻi Haʻatakalaua line	Tuʻi Tonga line	Tuʻi Kanokupolu line
Kalolaine Fusimatalili	George Tupou I	Fīnau Kaunanga
Fifita Vavʻau	Tēvita ʻUnga	Sālote Mafile‘o Pilolevu	Filiaipulotu
Fusipala Taukiʻonetuku	Fatafehi Toutaitokotaha
Lavinia Veiongo	George Tupou II	ʻAnaseini Takipō
Viliami Tungī Mailefihi	Sālote Tupou III	Vīlai Tupou (illegitimate son)	Tupou Seini
Tāufaʻāhau Tupou IV	Halaevalu Mataʻaho ʻAhomeʻe	Siaosi 'Alipate Tupou, Baron Vaea	Tuputupu Ma'afu-'o-Tukuialahi
George Tupou V	Tupou VI	Nanasipauʻu Tukuʻaho
ʻIlima Lei Fifita Tohi (illegitimate daughter)	Tupoutoʻa ʻUlukalala	Sinaitakala Fakafanua
Taufaʻahau Manumataongo

- Fox, James J.; Sather, Clifford (1996). Origins, Ancestry and Alliance: Explorations in Austronesian Ethnography. Canberra: Department of Anthropology, Australian National University. p. 252. ISBN 978-0-7315-2432-7. OCLC 245762652.
- Kaeppler, Adrienne Lois; D.C. (2008). The Pacific Arts of Polynesia and Micronesia. Oxford: Oxford University Press. p. 90. ISBN 978-0-19-284238-1. OCLC 236158882.
- Völkel, Svenja (2010). Social Structure, Space and Possession in Tongan Culture and Language: An Ethnolinguistic Study. Amsterdam; Philadelphia: John Benjamins Publishing. p. 45. ISBN 978-90-272-0283-3.
- Wood-Ellem, Elizabeth (1999). Queen Sālote of Tonga: The Story of an Era 1900-1965. Auckland, N.Z: Auckland University Press. p. front. ISBN 978-0-8248-2529-4. OCLC 262293605.

== Bibliography ==
- Biersack, Aletta (1996). Fox, James J.; Sather, Clifford (eds.). "Rivals and Wives: Affinal Politics and the Tongan Ramage". Origins, Ancestry and Alliance: Explorations in Austronesian Ethnography. Canberra: Department of Anthropology, Australian National University. doi:10.22459/OAA.10.2006. ISBN 978-0-7315-2432-7. OCLC 245762652.
- Brenchley, Julius Lucius (1873). Jottings During the Cruise of H. M. S. Curac̜oa Among the South Seaislands in 1865. London: Longmans, Green. OCLC 6749498.
- Hixon, Margaret (2000). Sālote: Queen of Paradise. Dunedin, NZ: University of Otago Press. ISBN 978-1-877133-78-7. OCLC 247978391.
- Rodman, Margaret (2007). House-girls Remember: Domestic Workers in Vanuatu. Honolulu: University of Hawaii Press. ISBN 978-0-8248-1856-2. OCLC 35760773.
- Rutherford, Noel (1977). Friendly Islands: A History of Tonga. Melbourne: Oxford University Press. ISBN 978-0-19-550519-1. OCLC 611102698.
- Wood-Ellem, Elizabeth (1999). Queen Sālote of Tonga: The Story of an Era 1900–1965. Auckland, N.Z: Auckland University Press. ISBN 978-0-8248-2529-4. OCLC 262293605.

Royal titles
Preceded by Nalesoni Laifone	Crown Princess of Tonga; 1889	Succeeded by Tāufaʻāhau
