= Sulieti Fieme'a Burrows =

Tongan textile artist

- Born: 1951; Falevai
- Awards: Member of the New Zealand Order of Merit (For services to Tongan art and education., 2019)

Sulieti Fieme'a Burrows MNZM (born 1951) is an artist and expert in the creation of tapa cloth. Born in Tonga, Burrows moved to New Zealand in the 1970s, bringing her knowledge of ngatu, the Tongan form of tapa, and other traditional Tongan crafts. Along with her daughter, Tui Emma Gillies, she has worked to share her expertise and revitalize the art of tapa.

== Early life and artwork ==
Sulieti Topeni was born in 1951 and raised on the island of Falevai. As a child, one of her chores was to prune the trunks of the paper mulberry trees in her family's orchard to ensure the bark used to make tapa wouldn't have holes. She would accompany her father on trips to the island's harbor to sell woven and sewn items to foreign visitors.

She met her husband, Barry Burrows, when he crashed his yacht on a reef in Fiji and decided to vacation in Tonga. Barry brought her to New Zealand to live in Manurewa in the 1970s. Sulieti sold her crafts, including art on tapa cloth and kahoa heilala necklaces, at the Ōtara Markets until 2011.

Her artwork includes contemporary motifs and designs, incorporating concepts from other textile art traditions. She also creates representations of kahoa heilala, a traditional celebratory garland in Tonga, out of modelling clay, which have been purchased by the Otago Museum, the Auckland Museum, and the National Gallery of Victoria.

== Collaboration with daughter ==
Burrow's daughter, Tui Emma Gillies, continues the family tradition of creating tapa cloth. Together they have presented workshops at institutions including the University of Hawai‘i, the University of Vienna, and the Museum of the Americas in Madrid. Gillies created a film, Vava’u ‘Falavai Flava, documenting Burrows's return to Vava’u and her work in reviving traditional ngatu practices. Their artwork has been displayed at the Mangere Arts Centre, the Corban Estate Arts Centre, and the Tautai Gallery in Auckland.

== Recognition ==
The mother and daughter team were recipients of the 2018 Pacific Heritage Art Award from Creative New Zealand, providing funds for the decoration of two large ngatu with women in Burrow's home village. The project revived the art of ngatu in Falevai, where the tradition had no longer been widely practiced.

In 2020, Burrows was honored as a Member of the New Zealand Order of Merit in recognition of her "services to Tongan art and education".
