= Manumataongo =

Manumataongo is a name. Notable people with the name include:

- Taufaʻahau Manumataongo (born 2013), Tongan royal
- Siaosi Tāufaʻāhau Manumataongo Tukuʻaho Tupou (1948–2012), King of Tonga
- Siaosi Manumataongo ʻAlaivahamamaʻo ʻAhoʻeitu Konstantin Tukuʻaho (born 1985), crown prince of Tonga
