= Fatafehi ʻAlaivahamamaʻo Tukuʻaho =

- Prince of Tonga, Lord Maʻatu
- Born: Fatafehi Alaivahamamao Tuku'aho; 17 February 1954; Royal Palace, Nukuʻalofa, Tonga
- Died: 17 December 2004 (aged 50); Nukuʻalofa, Tonga
- Burial: Malaʻekula
- Spouse: Heimataura Seiloni (m. 1980; died 1985) Alaileula Poutasi Jungblut (m. 1989)
- Issue: Prince Tungi; Salote Maumautaimi Tukuʻaho; Sione Ikamafana Tukuʻaho; Etani Tukuʻaho
Names
- Fatafehi ʻAlaivahamamaʻo Tukuʻaho
- House: Tupou
- Father: Tāufaʻāhau Tupou IV
- Mother: Halaevalu Mataʻaho ʻAhomeʻe
- Religion: Methodism

Prince Fatafehi ʻAlaivahamamaʻo Tukuʻaho, styled Lord Maʻatu (17 February 1954 – 17 December 2004), was a member of the Tongan royal family.

== Biography ==
Prince Fatafehi ʻAlaivahamamaʻo Tukuʻaho was the second son of Crown Prince Tāufaʻāhau and his wife, Crown Princess Halaevalu Mataʻaho, and a grandchild of Queen Sālote Tupou III of Tonga. He was known to be a staunch advocate for the growing democratic movement in Tonga and was dubbed the "people's prince" by activists.

He died in Nukuʻalofa, Tonga on 17 December 2004 of a heart attack and is buried in the Royal Tongan Cemetery known as Malaʻekula.

== Personal life and issue ==
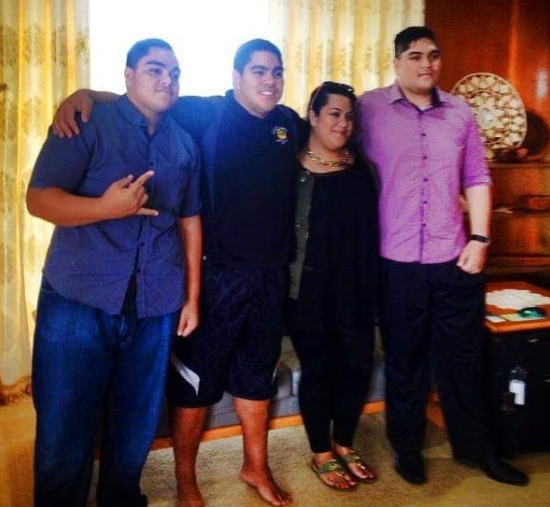

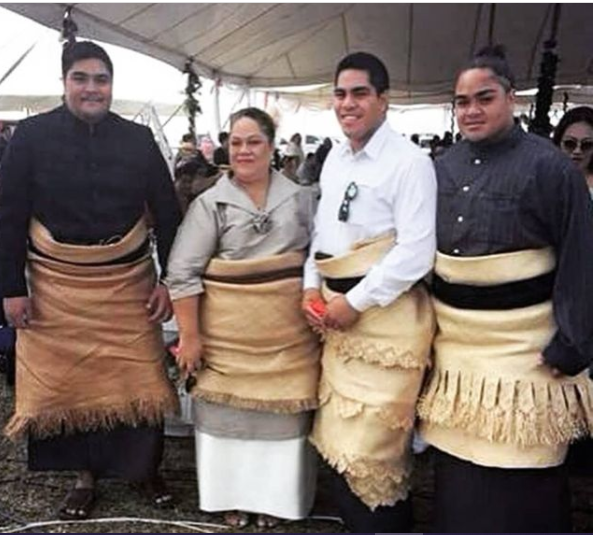
Lord Maatu and Lady Maatu children

In July 1980, Prince Fatafehi ʻAlaivahamamaʻo, at the time third in line to the throne, caused controversy in the Tongan royal family when he married his first wife – a commoner, Heimataura Seiloni – in a private ceremony in Hawaii. Heimataura Seiloni was the adopted daughter of Tahitian high chief Matagialalua Tavana Salmon Anderson and daughter of his Tongan wife, Tuimala Kaho, a singer and songwriter. The marriage resulted in the Prince being stripped of his title. His wife later died of cancer in Nukuʻalofa on 19 September 1985.

Returning to Tonga after the death of his first wife, he married ʻAlaileula Poutasi Jungblut on 11 July 1989. ʻAlaileula is the Samoan daughter of Melvin Jungblut and his wife Lola Tosi Malietoa, a granddaughter of Malietoa Tanumafili II. After the death of Prince Maʻatu, his widow ʻAlaileula became embroiled in controversy for allegedly authorising the killing of the king's cow. This royal rift caused her to briefly return to Samoa before settling the matter with the royal family.

Lord Maʻatu and Dowager Lady Maʻatu had four children:

- Sitiveni Polu Leʻuligana Tukuʻaho, formally known as the Prince Tungi;
- Salote Maumautaimi Tukuʻaho who is the only daughter of Lord Maʻatu and Alaileula Tukuʻaho;
- Sione Ikamafana Tukuʻaho;
- Etani Haʻamea Tukuʻaho.

Upon the death of Prince Maʻatu, his eldest son Sitiveni Polu Leʻuligana inherited the title, as Prince Tungi. The second son, Sione Ikamafana Tukuʻaho, was raised by his paternal aunt, Princess Salote Mafileʻo Pilolevu Tuita. Such practice is commonplace amongst the Tongan royal family, whereby Princess Lātūfuipeka was also raised by her uncle, King George Tupou V.
