= ʻUelingatoni Ngū =

Crown Prince of Tonga from 1879 to 1885

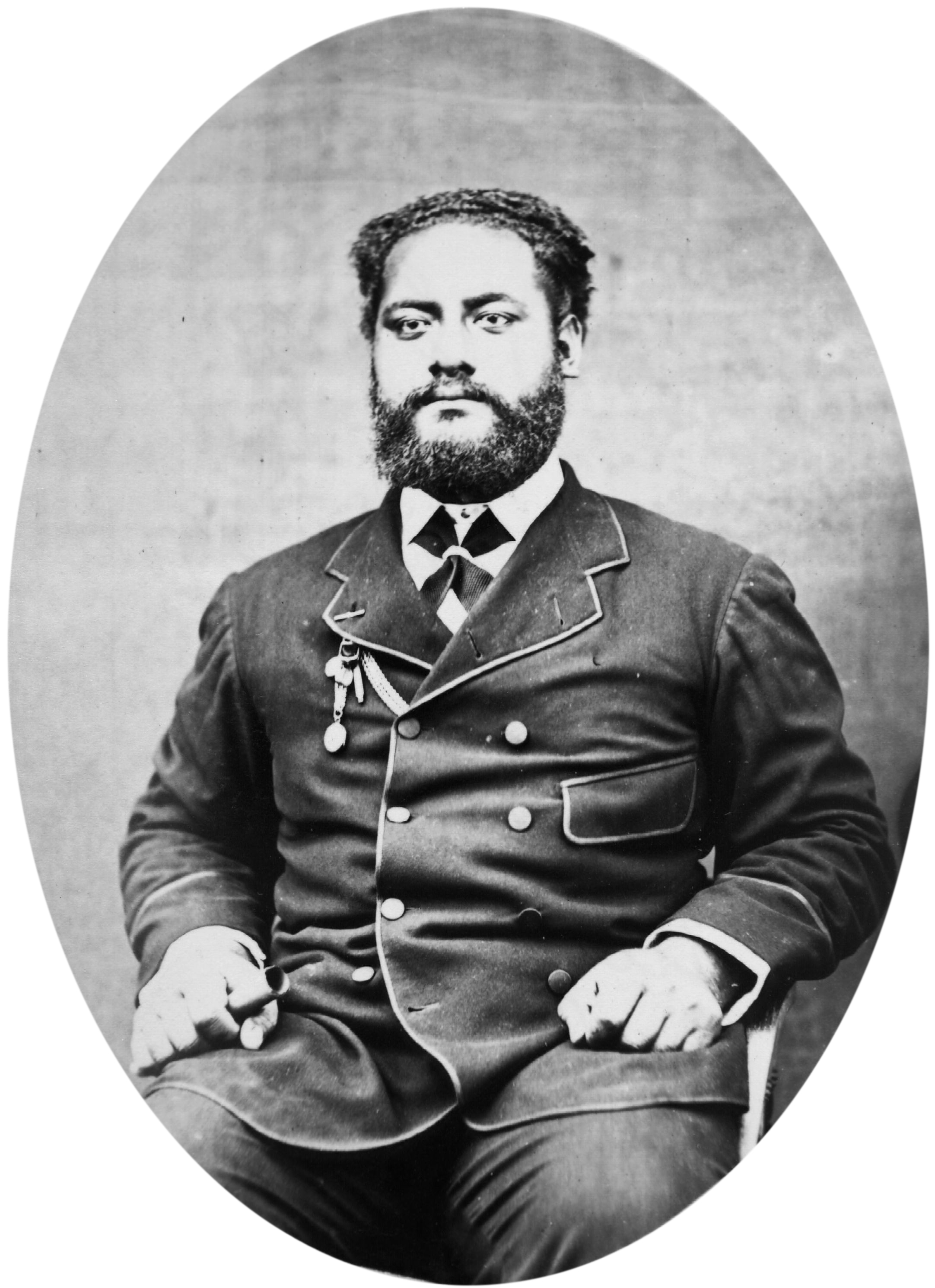
- Ngū in 1884

Crown Prince of Tonga
- Tenure: 18 December 1879 – 11 March 1885
- Predecessor: Tēvita ʻUnga
- Successor: Nalesoni Laifone
- Monarch: George Tupou I
- Born: 3 August 1854
- Died: 11 March 1885 (aged 30); Nukuʻalofa
Names
- ʻUiliamu ʻUelingatoni Ngū Tupoumālohi
- House: House of Tupou
- Father: Tēvita ʻUnga
- Mother: Fifita Vavaʻu

ʻUiliamu ʻUelingatoni Ngū Tupoumālohi (3 August 1854 – 11 March 1885) was the second Crown Prince of Tonga from 1879 to 1885. He is also commonly referred by his Anglicized name as "Wellington Ngu".

== Life ==
Born in 1854, he was the second child and eldest son of Tēvita ʻUnga and Fifita Vavaʻu, the second daughter of Liufau, Tuʻi Haʻangana Ngata, and his second wife, Hulita Tuʻifua. Although his paternal grandfather Tāufaʻāhau had become King George Tupou I of a united Tonga in 1845, Ngū's father was considered illegitimate by Christian standard because he was born to a secondary consort. After the death of his uncle Vuna Takitakimālohi, his father ʻUnga was legitimized and named Crown Prince under the terms of the first written constitution of Tonga on 4 November 1875. The line of succession outlined in the constitution gave precedence to his father and then Ngu's legitimate descendants followed by his younger brother Nalesoni Laifone and elder sister Fusipala Taukiʻonetuku and their descendants.

From 1875 to 1877, he serve as the aide-de-camp to his grandfather King George Tupou I. While seeking medical attention in Auckland in 1879, his father died and Ngu succeeded as heir apparent to the Tongan throne, becoming the Crown Prince of Tonga on 18 December 1879. He also became the Governor of Haʻapai and Vavaʻu from 1877 to 1885.

ʻUelingatoni Ngū died on 11 March 1885. He left no legitimate issue so the position of heir apparent fell on his brother and then to their sister after his death. In 1889, King Tupou I's will stipulated: "Since Fusi is dead, who should have succeeded Laifone, then Tāufaʻāhau should inherit." By 1889, King Tupou I had outlived his two sons and three grandchildren, leaving his great-grandson Tāufaʻāhau (ʻUelingatoni Ngū's nephew) as the next crown prince who would succeed his great-grandfather in 1893 as George Tupou II.

== Marriage and issue ==
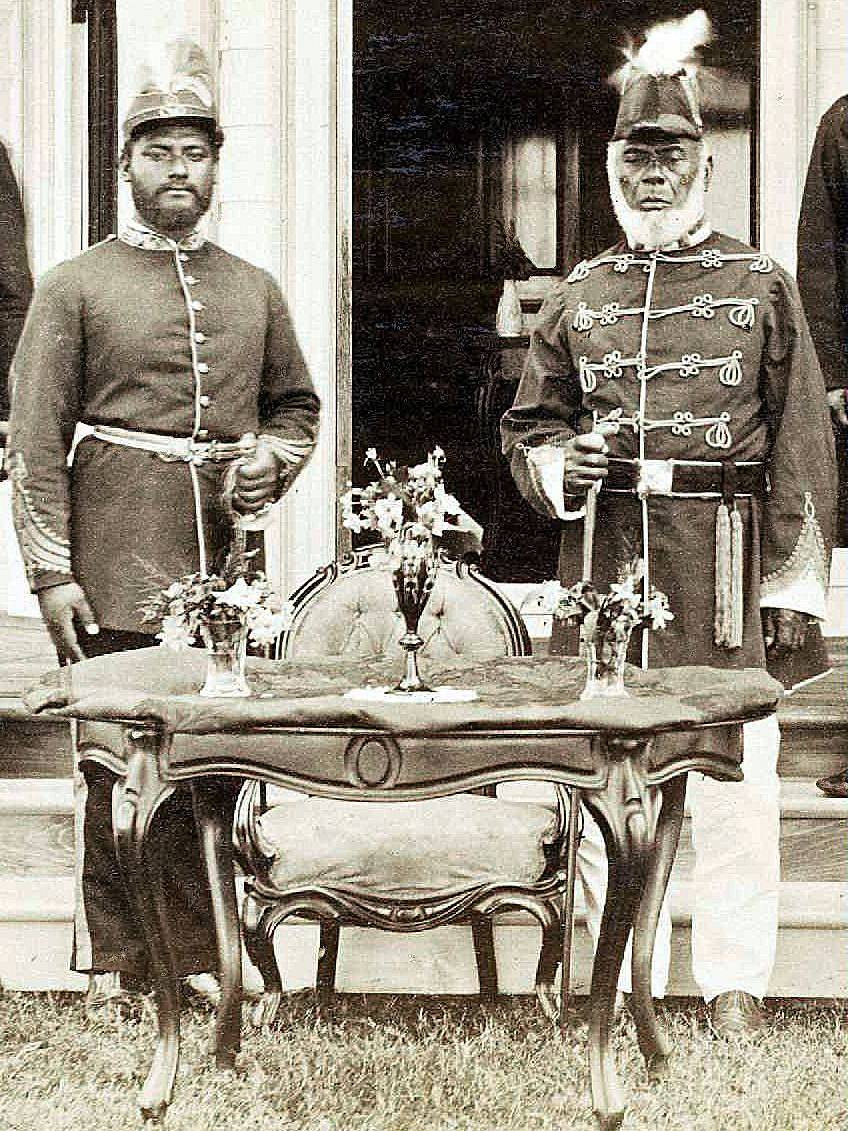
Crown Prince ʻUelingatoni Ngū and King George Tupou I

He married Asupa Funaki (d. 1931), daughter of Babanga Moala. He had no children with his wife, but had three illegitimate children, two sons and one daughter.

== Bibliography ==
- Biersack, Aletta (1996). Fox, James J.; Sather, Clifford (eds.). "Rivals and Wives: Affinal Politics and the Tongan Ramage". Origins, Ancestry and Alliance: Explorations in Austronesian Ethnography. Canberra: Department of Anthropology, Australian National University. doi:10.22459/OAA.10.2006. hdl:2027/mdp.39015041090880. ISBN 978-0-7315-2432-7. OCLC 245762652.
- Brenchley, Julius Lucius (1873). Jottings During the Cruise of H. M. S. Curac̜oa Among the South Seaislands in 1865. London: Longmans, Green. OCLC 6749498.
- Hixon, Margaret (2000). Sālote: Queen of Paradise. Dunedin, NZ: University of Otago Press. ISBN 978-1-877133-78-7. OCLC 247978391.
- Rodman, Margaret (2007). House-girls Remember: Domestic Workers in Vanuatu. Honolulu: University of Hawaii Press. ISBN 978-0-8248-1856-2. OCLC 35760773.
- Rutherford, Noel (1977). Friendly Islands: A History of Tonga. Melbourne: Oxford University Press. ISBN 978-0-19-550519-1. OCLC 611102698.
- Wood-Ellem, Elizabeth (1999). Queen Sālote of Tonga: The Story of an Era 1900–1965. Auckland, N.Z: Auckland University Press. ISBN 978-0-8248-2529-4. OCLC 262293605.

Royal titles
Preceded by Tēvita ʻUnga	Crown Prince of Tonga; 1879–1885	Succeeded by Nalesoni Laifone
