= Viliami Tukuʻaho =

Tongan prince (born 1988)

- Prince Ata of Tonga
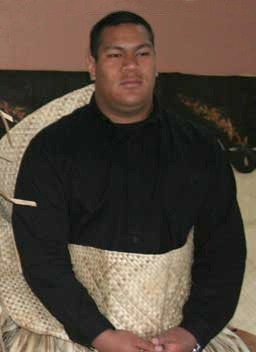
- Ata in 2006
- Born: 27 April 1988 (age 38); Nukuʻalofa, Tonga
Names
- Viliami ʻUnuaki-ʻo-Tonga Lalaka moe ʻEiki Tukuʻaho, Prince Ata
- House: Tupou
- Father: Tupou VI
- Mother: Nanasipau'u
- Religion: The Church of Jesus Christ of Latter-day Saints

Viliami ʻUnakiʻotonga Lalaka moe ʻEiki Tukuʻaho, Prince Ata (born 27 April 1988) is a member of the Tongan royal family and the younger son of Tupou VI, King of Tonga.

== Biography ==
Ata is the son of Tupou VI, King of Tonga, and Queen Nanasipauʻu Tukuʻaho. He has two older siblings, Princess Lātūfuipeka Tukuʻaho and Crown Prince Tupoutoʻa ʻUlukalala. He belongs to the line of succession to the Tongan throne and is not married. He was appointed to the title of Ata in September 2006.

He was educated at Canberra Grammar School in Australia.

In 2014, King Tupou VI sent Prime Minister Sialeʻataongo Tuʻivakanō and a group of soldiers to a church in Haveluloto to prevent him from being baptized as a member of the Church of Jesus Christ of Latter-day Saints. The following year, he was baptised in the Church in a ceremony in Hawaii without his father's knowledge.

== Title, styles and honours ==
Styles of Prince Ata of Tonga
- Reference style: His Royal Highness
- Spoken style: Your Royal Highness

=== Title ===
- 25 September 2006 – present: His Royal Highness Prince Ata of Tonga

=== Honours ===
- Tonga: Knight Grand Cross with Collar of the Royal Order of Pouono
- Tonga: Knight Grand Cross with Collar of the Order of Queen Salote Tupou III
- Tonga: Knight Grand Cross of the Order of the Crown of Tonga
- Tonga: Recipient of the King Tupou VI Coronation Medal
- Tonga: Recipient of the King George Tupou V Coronation Medal

Viliami Tukuʻaho House of Tupou Born: 27 September 1988
Lines of succession
Preceded by Princess Salote Mafile'o Pilolevu	Succession to the Tongan throne 6th position	Succeeded by Princess Lātūfuipeka
Titles of nobility
Preceded by Prince Lavaka Ata ʻUlukālala	15th Chief ʻAta; 25 Sept 2006 –	Incumbent
