= Eremias brenchleyi =

Conservation status
- Least Concern (IUCN 3.1)

Scientific classification
- Kingdom: Animalia
- Phylum: Chordata
- Class: Reptilia
- Order: Squamata
- Family: Lacertidae
- Genus: Eremias
- Species: E. brenchleyi

Binomial name
- Eremias brenchleyi Günther, 1872

Species of lizard

Eremias brenchleyi, commonly known as the Ordos racerunner, is a species of lizard in the family Lacertidae. The species is endemic to China.

== Etymology ==
The specific name, brenchleyi, is in honour of English naturalist Julius Lucius Brenchley, who collected the holotype.

== Geographic range ==
In China, E. brenchleyi is found in the provinces Anhui, Hebei, Henan, Jiangsu, Shaanxi, Shandong, and the autonomous region Inner Mongolia.

== Habitat ==
The preferred natural habitats of E. brenchleyi are forest, grassland, and rocky areas, at altitudes of 200–1,000 m (660–3,280 ft).

== Diet ==
E. brenchleyi preys upon insects.

== Reproduction ==
E. brenchleyi is oviparous.
