= Lisiate Faʻaoso =

Lisiate Fa'aoso
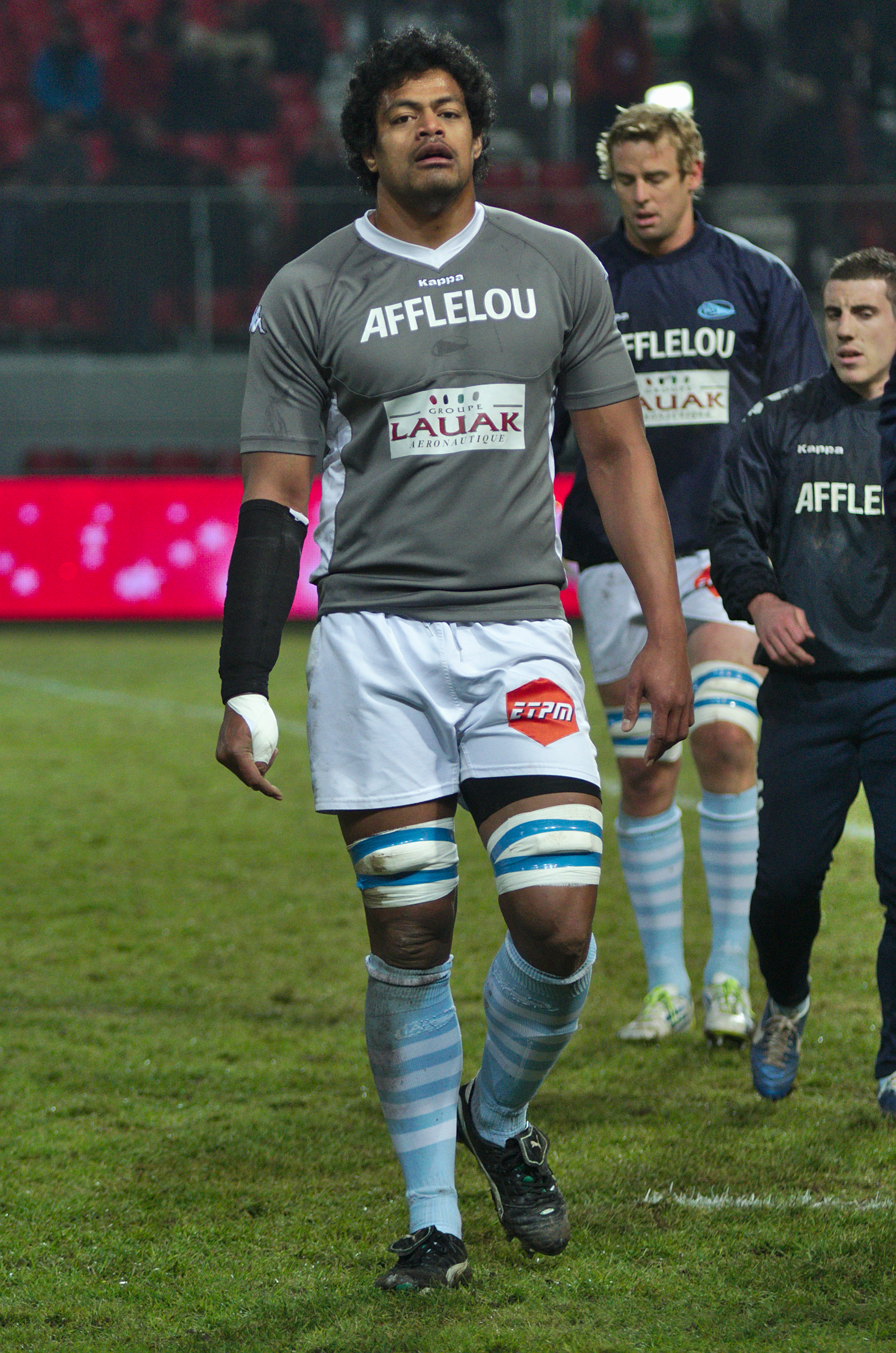
- Born: 18 March 1983 (age 43) Kolonga, Tonga
- Height: 1.98 m (6 ft 6 in)
- Weight: 118 kg (260 lb; 18 st 8 lb)

Rugby union career
- Position: Lock
Senior career
Years	Team	Apps	(Points)
2006−2009	Manawatu	5	(0)
2009−2013	SU Agen	80	(35)
2013−2015	Aviron Bayonnais	54	(30)
- Correct as of 2 November 2018
International career
Years	Team	Apps	(Points)
2004−	Tonga	16	(5)
- Correct as of 24 November 2014

Lisiate Fa'aoso (born Kolonga, 18 March 1983) is a Tongan rugby union footballer who currently plays for Bayonne. He plays as a lock.

== Career ==
Fa'aoso plays for Bayonne. He has been in the Tonga squad since 2004. He was also selected for the 2007 Rugby World Cup finals where he played two matches.
