= Crown Prince of Tonga =

Heir to the Tongan throne

- Coat of arms of Tonga

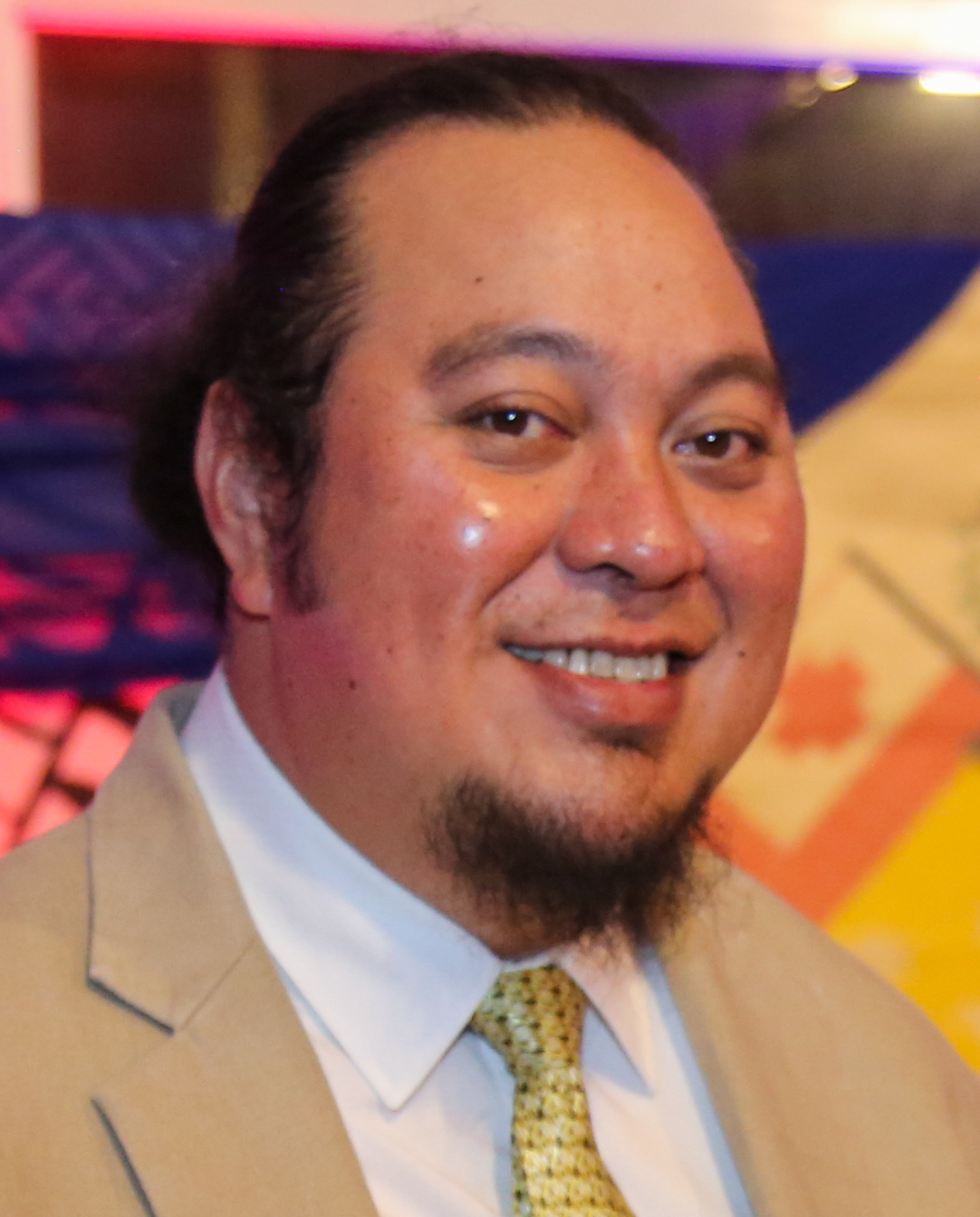
- Incumbent; Tupoutoʻa ʻUlukalala since 18 March 2012
- Style: His Royal Highness
- Residence: Royal Palace, Nukuʻalofa
- Appointer: Monarch
- Inaugural holder: Vuna Takitakimālohi
- Formation: 4 December 1845; 180 years ago
- Deputy: Taufaʻahau Manumataongo

The Crown Prince of Tonga is the heir to the throne of Tonga.

The Article 32 of the Constitution of Tonga provides for male-preference primogeniture, meaning that the eldest son of the King automatically succeeds to the crown upon the monarch's death, and that the eldest daughter may succeed to the crown only if she has no living brothers and no deceased brothers who left surviving legitimate descendants. By convention, the heir to the throne also bears the noble title of Tupoutoʻa; this has been the case since then-crown prince Tāufaʻāhau was conferred with the title in the late 1930s.

The current Crown Prince of Tonga is Tupoutoʻa ʻUlukalala, who became heir apparent to the throne on 18 March 2012 upon the accession of his father, Tupou VI, as King.

== Succession to George Tupou I ==
The long reign of King George Tupou I (r. 1845–1893), the first constitutional monarch of Tonga, saw six different heirs apparent to the Tongan throne. The only legitimate son of the King, Vuna Takitakimālohi, died unmarried in January 1862, leaving the King without an heir. The succession would remain vacant for thirteen years until the promulgation of the Constitution of Tonga in 1875, which legitimized Vuna's half-brother Tēvita ʻUnga and named him Crown Prince. By 1889, the King would outlive ʻUnga and all three of his grandchildren – ʻUelingatoni Ngū, Nalesoni Laifone and ʻElisiva Fusipala Taukiʻonetuku. That left his great-grandson Tāufaʻāhau, Fusipala's son, as the next Crown Prince, who would succeed his great-grandfather in 1893 as George Tupou II.

== Crown Princes of Tonga since 1845 ==
Portrait	Name	Relation to monarch	Birth	Became Crown Prince	Ceased to be Crown Prince	Death	Monarch
	Vuna Takitakimālohi	Sole legitimate son	c. 1844	4 December 1845	January 1862 deceased		George Tupou I
	Tēvita ʻUnga	Son	c. 1824	4 November 1875	18 December 1879 deceased		George Tupou I
	ʻUelingatoni Ngū	Grandson	3 August 1854	18 December 1879	11 March 1885 deceased		George Tupou I
	Nalesoni Laifone	Grandson	c. 1859	11 March 1885	6 June 1889 deceased		George Tupou I
	ʻElisiva Fusipala Taukiʻonetuku	Granddaughter	18 May 1850	6 June 1889	September 1889 deceased		George Tupou I
	Tāufaʻāhau	Double great-grandson	18 June 1874	September 1889	18 February 1893 acceded to throne as George Tupou II	5 April 1918	George Tupou I
	Sālote Mafile‘o Pilolevu	Eldest daughter	13 March 1900		5 April 1918 acceded to throne as Sālote Tupou III	16 December 1965	George Tupou II
	Tupoutoʻa Tungī	Eldest son	4 July 1918		16 December 1965 acceded to throne as Tāufaʻāhau Tupou IV	10 September 2006	Sālote Tupou III
	Tupoutoʻa	Eldest son	4 May 1948	16 December 1965	10 September 2006 acceded to throne as George Tupou V	18 March 2012	Tāufaʻāhau Tupou IV
	Tupoutoʻa Lavaka	Younger brother	12 July 1959	27 September 2006	18 March 2012 acceded to throne as Tupou VI	Living	George Tupou V
	Tupoutoʻa ʻUlukalala	Eldest son	17 September 1985	18 March 2012	Incumbent	Living	Tupou VI

== See also ==
- Succession to the Tongan throne

== Bibliography ==
- Marcus, George E. (1978). "The nobility and the chiefly tradition in the modern Kingdom of Tonga". The Journal of the Polynesian Society. 87 (1). ISSN 0032-4000. JSTOR 20705328.
- Rodman, Margaret; Rutherford, Noel (2007). Rutherford: Shirley Baker/Tonga. Honolulu: University of Hawaii Press. ISBN 978-0-8248-1856-2.
- Spurway, John (2015). Ma'afu, Prince of Tonga, Chief of Fiji: A Life of Fiji's First Tui Lau. Canberra: Australian National University Press. ISBN 978-1-925021-18-9. OCLC 879538614. Archived from the original on 16 July 2015.
- Wood-Ellem, Elizabeth (1999). Queen Sālote of Tonga: The Story of an Era 1900–1965. Auckland, N.Z: Auckland University Press. ISBN 978-0-8248-2529-4. OCLC 262293605.
- Biersack, Aletta (1996). Fox, James J.; Sather, Clifford (eds.). "Rivals and Wives: Affinal Politics and the Tongan Ramage". Origins, Ancestry and Alliance: Explorations in Austronesian Ethnography. Canberra: Department of Anthropology, Australian National University. doi:10.22459/OAA.10.2006. ISBN 978-0-7315-2432-7. OCLC 245762652.
- Hixon, Margaret (2000). Sālote: Queen of Paradise. Dunedin, NZ: University of Otago Press. ISBN 978-1-877133-78-7. OCLC 247978391.
