= Australia–Tonga relations =

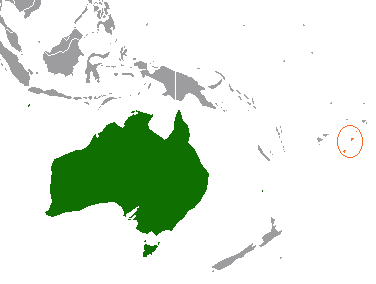

- Australia: Tonga

Foreign relations exist between Australia and Tonga. Tonga has a High Commission in Canberra, and Australia has a High Commission in Nukuʻalofa.

Australia stands as Tonga’s largest development partner since its independence in 1970, with contributions and comprehensive programs annually. Australia provides substantial financial and technical assistance in areas like health, education, disaster resilience, infrastructure, and the economy. Australia’s aid totalled AUD 74.8 million for the 2022-2025 fiscal year. The partnership has seen extensive cooperation through programs such as the Tonga New Zealand Australia Technical Vocational Education Training Support Program and the Pacific Horticultural and Agricultural Market Access Program, which also support Tonga’s growth by enhancing agricultural exports and vocational education.

== History ==
Monthly value of Australian merchandise exports to Tonga (A$ millions) since 1988

In 1999, Australian Foreign Minister Alexander Downer welcomed Tonga's admission to the United Nations. The Minister said that the Australian Government had helped fund the Commonwealth Small Island States Office in New York so Pacific states can afford to be represented here.

Following the outbreak of violence in Tonga in 2006, the Tongan Government asked the Australian Government for assistance from Australian forces. Following this request, eighty-five Australian soldiers and police were sent to Tonga with support from New Zealand.

In 2008 Tonga's High Commission in Canberra opened. Crown Prince ʻAhoʻeitu ʻUnuakiʻotonga Tukuʻaho (now King Tupou VI) became its first chief of mission.

== Development assistance ==
Australia is the largest donor of aid to Tonga through its Ausaid program. In 2008/09, Australian aid amounted to AUD13.2M Australian Foreign Minister Stephen Smith said in 2009 that Tonga was an important partner of Australia in the Pacific. He further added "We have extensive development assistance programs with both countries [Samoa and Tonga] and we have very strong people-to-people links.

In February 2009, fifty Tongan seasonal workers from a federal government pilot scheme aimed at combatting a skills shortage in the rural sector arrived in the town of Robinvale, Victoria.

== Polls ==
According to a 2022 poll by the Lowy Institute, Tonga is the sixth most positively viewed country by Australians. It garnered a 67% positivity rating, placing it ahead of the United States, which had a 65% rating. The only other countries from Oceania included in the poll were Papua New Guinea, which had a 61% rating, and New Zealand, which placed first with a 86% rating.
