= Salote Maumautaimi Tuku'aho =

- 'Eiki Salote Maumautaimi
- Born: Tuku'aho; 14 November 1991 (age 34); Royal Palace, Nukuʻalofa, Tonga
Names
- Salote Maumautaimi Haim Hadessah Ber Yardena ‘Alanuanua Tuku’aho
- House: Tupou
- Father: Prince Fatafehi 'Alaivahamama'o Tuku'aho
- Mother: Alaileula Tuku'aho
- Religion: Methodism

Salote Maumautaimi Tuku'aho (14 November 1991) is a member of the Tongan Royal Family.

== Early life ==
Salote is the second child and only daughter of Prince Fatafehi 'Alaivahamama'o Tuku'aho and Alaileula Tuku'aho.

== Official titles ==
Salote Maumautaimi Tuku'aho is a legitimate daughter of royalty for both the nations of Tonga and Samoa. While her father the late Prince Fatafehi Alaivahamama'o was stripped of his 'Princely' title for marrying a commoner, many in Tonga and particularly those from the Tatakamotonga, Fua'amotu, Navutoka regions have continued to refer to Salote as the region's princess due to her high rank and direct descent from the King.

Her official known titles are 'Eiki Salote Maumautaimi Tuku'aho, the Honourable Salote Maumautaimi Tuku'aho or Princess Salote Maumautaimi Tuku'aho.

== Duties ==
Salote represents his Majesty King Tupou VI in an official capacity for both state and family functions.

In 2007 Salote, led massed schoolgirls in traditional songs and dances at a ceremony at a waterfront park in Nuku'alofa to open the Pacific Islands Forum meeting, involving leaders from 16 member countries. She was present Her uncle, King George Tupou V, who was chief guest of honour at the time.

In 2015 she was the guest of honour for the introduction of a new water supply in Fua'amotu which was gifted by the Japanese government.

In 2017 she accompanied her older brother Prince Tungi in his presentation to the royal palace for the late Queen Mother's funeral.

In July 2022 it was announced that she was engaged to Faka’osifono Valevale, son of Lord Nuku.
