= List of high commissioners of Tonga to Australia =

The following persons have served as Tongan High Commissioner to Australia. Countries belonging to the Commonwealth of Nations typically exchange High Commissioners, rather than Ambassadors. Though there are a few technical and historical differences, they are now in practice one and the same office. Crown Prince ʻAhoʻeitu ʻUnuakiʻotonga Tukuʻaho was appointed the first High Commissioner of the Kingdom of Tonga to Australia in 2008, but left office in 2012 upon the death of his brother King George Tupou V to succeed him as King Tupou VI. The current High Commissioner is Princess ʻAngelika Lātūfuipeka Tukuʻaho, the eldest daughter of the current King of Tonga, who presented her credentials on August 22, 2012.

High Commissioner	Start of Term	End of Term
Crown Prince ʻAhoʻeitu ʻUnuakiʻotonga Tukuʻaho	2008	2012
Princess ʻAngelika Lātūfuipeka Tukuʻaho	2012	present

== See also ==
- Australia–Tonga relations
