= Siaosi Tuʻipelehake =

Prime Minister of Tonga in 1905

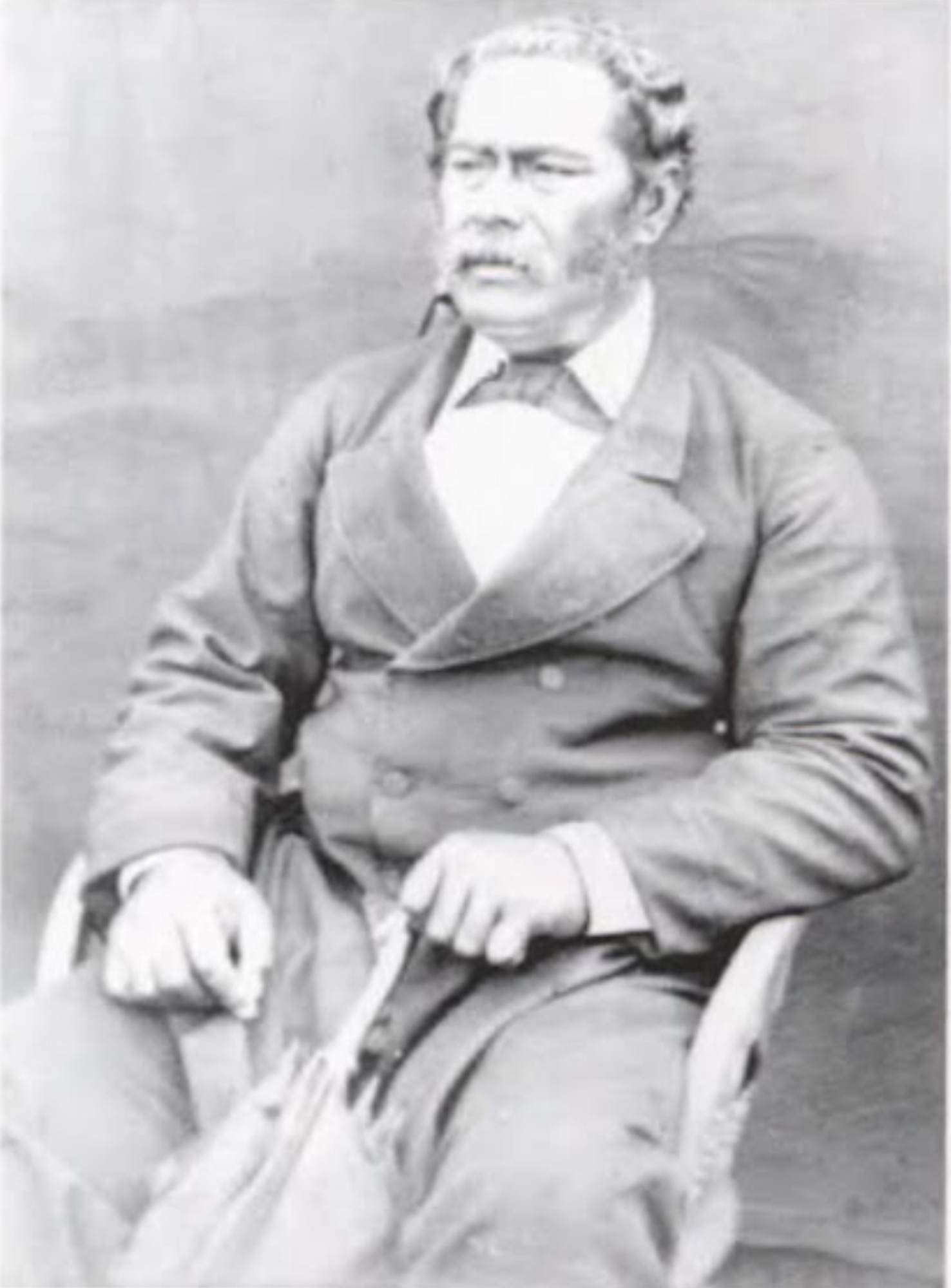

Prime Minister of Tonga
- In office January 1905 – January 1905
- Monarch: George Tupou II
- Preceded by: Siosateki Veikune
- Succeeded by: Sione Tupou Mateialona

Personal details
- Spouse: ʻElisiva Fusipala Taukiʻonetuku
- Children: George Tupou II

Siaosi Tuʻipelehake (born Siaosi Fatafehi Toutaitokotaha) was a politician from Tonga who briefly served as Prime Minister of Tonga in January 1905. Tu'ipelehake is a traditional very high-ranking Tongan title. He was the 4th Tu'ipelehake.

He was the father of George Tupou II and a grandson of George Tupou I.

== Family tree ==
Tupou family tree

Tuʻi Haʻatakalaua line	Tuʻi Tonga line	Tuʻi Kanokupolu line
Kalolaine Fusimatalili	George Tupou I	Fīnau Kaunanga
Fifita Vavʻau	Tēvita ʻUnga	Sālote Mafile‘o Pilolevu	Filiaipulotu
Fusipala Taukiʻonetuku	Fatafehi Toutaitokotaha
Lavinia Veiongo	George Tupou II	ʻAnaseini Takipō
Viliami Tungī Mailefihi	Sālote Tupou III	Vīlai Tupou (illegitimate son)	Tupou Seini
Tāufaʻāhau Tupou IV	Halaevalu Mataʻaho ʻAhomeʻe	Siaosi 'Alipate Tupou, Baron Vaea	Tuputupu Ma'afu-'o-Tukuialahi
George Tupou V	Tupou VI	Nanasipauʻu Tukuʻaho
ʻIlima Lei Fifita Tohi (illegitimate daughter)	Tupoutoʻa ʻUlukalala	Sinaitakala Fakafanua
Taufaʻahau Manumataongo

- Fox, James J.; Sather, Clifford (1996). Origins, Ancestry and Alliance: Explorations in Austronesian Ethnography. Canberra: Department of Anthropology, Australian National University. p. 252. ISBN 978-0-7315-2432-7. OCLC 245762652.
- Kaeppler, Adrienne Lois; D.C. (2008). The Pacific Arts of Polynesia and Micronesia. Oxford: Oxford University Press. p. 90. ISBN 978-0-19-284238-1. OCLC 236158882.
- Völkel, Svenja (2010). Social Structure, Space and Possession in Tongan Culture and Language: An Ethnolinguistic Study. Amsterdam; Philadelphia: John Benjamins Publishing. p. 45. ISBN 978-90-272-0283-3.
- Wood-Ellem, Elizabeth (1999). Queen Sālote of Tonga: The Story of an Era 1900-1965. Auckland, N.Z: Auckland University Press. p. front. ISBN 978-0-8248-2529-4. OCLC 262293605.
