= Tēvita ʻUnga =

Prime Minister of Tonga from 1876 to 1879

- Crown Prince of Tonga
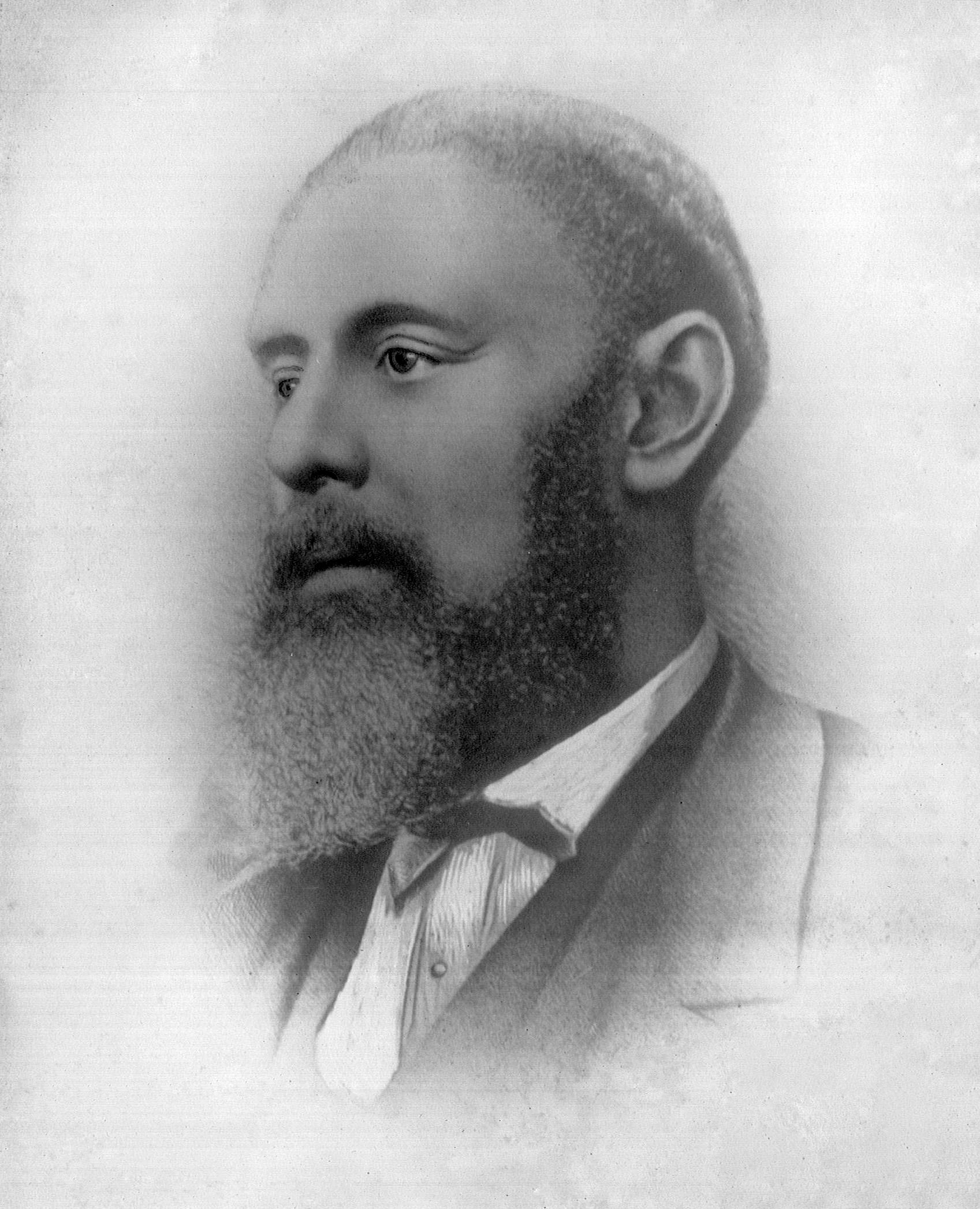
- ‘Unga, c. 1875

Prime Minister of Tonga
- In office 1 January 1876 – 18 December 1879
- Monarch: George Tupou I
- Preceded by: Office established
- Succeeded by: Shirley Waldemar Baker
- Born: c. 1824
- Died: 18 December 1879 (aged 54–55); Auckland, New Zealand
- Burial: 10 June 1880; Malaʻe Lahi, ʻUiha, Haʻapai
- Spouse: Fifita Vavaʻu; Teisa Palu
- Issue: Fusipala Taukiʻonetuku ʻUelingatoni Ngū; Nalesoni Laifone
Names
- Tēvita (David) ʻUnga Motangitau
- House: House of Tupou
- Father: George Tupou I
- Mother: Kalolaine Fusimatalili
- Religion: Methodism

Tēvita ʻUnga (c. 1824 – 18 December 1879) was the first Crown Prince and Prime Minister of Tonga.

== Life ==
Born in c. 1824 to Tuʻi Haʻapai Tāufaʻāhau and one of his secondary wives, Kalolaine Fusimatalili, of the Fusitua line. His father Tāufaʻāhau later became King George Tupou I of a united Tonga. On 7 August 1831, Tupou was baptised into the Christian faith along with ʻUnga and his sibling. He was given the name Tēvita or David after the biblical King David. Following Tupou's marriage to Sālote Lupepauʻu in the Christian rite, he cast aside his secondary consorts and declared all his children by them illegitimate including ʻUnga. After his father moved to Tongatapu, he appointed ʻUnga as acting governor of Vavaʻu. In July 1865, English explorer Julius Brenchley visited Vavaʻu for five days and met governor ʻUnga, who he described:

The governor is a very tall, imposing-looking man, in spite of the loss of an eye, the result either of an accident or a wound in war. He was also minus two fingers, cut off as a tribute, according to the custom of these islands, to some deceased relatives. David has the reputation of being a great warrior, and a friend of civilization; he speaks a little English, provided there be no missionary within earshot. I found him dressed in a piece of tapa, which he told me he changed every three days, and which covered all his body with the exception of his legs and feet. He has a bed and some old furniture of European make; his flag, the same as his father's, is red, with a cross of the same colour on a white ground in the upper corner.

After the death of Queen Sālote Lupepauʻu's son Prince Vuna Takitakimālohi in 1862, Tupou I was left without an heir to the throne. As a result, ʻUnga was legitimised and named Crown Prince under the terms of the first written constitution of Tonga on 4 November 1875. ʻUnga was appointed the first Prime Minister of Tonga on 1 January 1876, a post he held until his death.

In November 1879, Reverend Shirley Waldemar Baker accompanied ʻUnga to Auckland for medical treatment. The Prince had been suffering from a serious liver ailment. The treatment was unable to save the Prince and he died in Auckland on 18 December 1879. Through the influence of Reverend Baker, the Crown Prince's remains were brought back on the German warship Nautilus on 20 May 1880. The funeral on 10 June at ʻUiha, Haʻapai was attended by the German marines aboard and gun salutes from the Nautilus added much pomp and grandeur to the event. As a sign of his gratitude, King Tupou I appointed Reverend Baker the next prime minister of Tonga. His father Tupou I would outlive ʻUnga's three children and be succeeded by his great-grandson George Tupou II, ʻUnga's maternal grandson.

== Marriage and issue ==
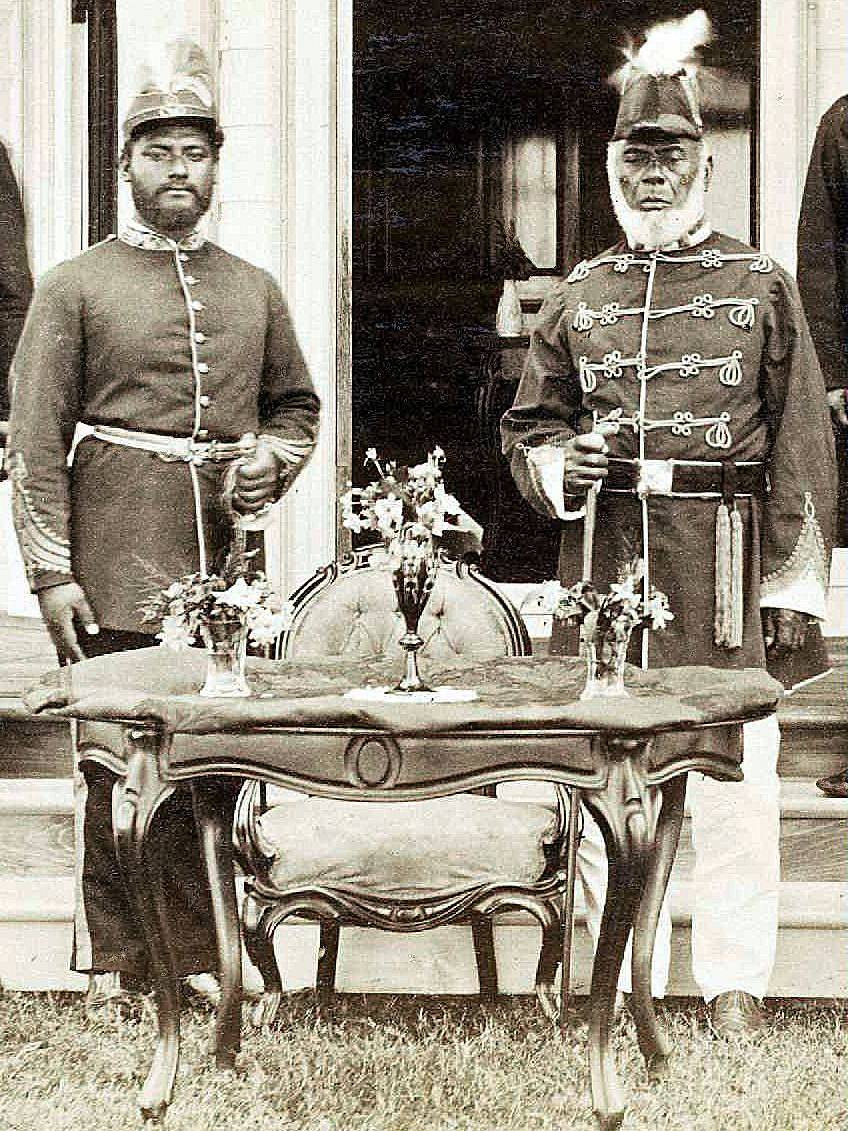
Tēvita ʻUnga's son Crown Prince ʻUelingatoni Ngū and King George Tupou I

His first wife was Fifita Vavaʻu (1835–1860), second daughter of Liufau, Tuʻi Haʻangana Ngata, by his second wife, Hulita Tuʻifua. From his first marriage, he had three children:

- Princess ʻElisiva Fusipala Taukiʻonetuku (18 May 1850 – September 1889), she married her cousin Prince Siaʻosi Fatafehi Toutaitokotaha (1842–1912), the fourth Tuʻi Pelehake, grandson of Tupou I through his mother Princess Salote Pilolevu Mafileo. They had one son, Prince Tāufaʻāhau, the future King George Tupou II.
- Crown Prince ʻUiliamu ʻUelingatoni Ngū Tupoumālohi (3 August 1854 – 11 March 1885), served as Governor of Haʻapai and Vavaʻu from 1877 to 1885. He inherited the title of Crown Prince on his father's death. He married Asupa Funaki (d. 1931), daughter of Babanga Moala. He had no children with his wife, but had three illegitimate children, two sons and one daughter.
- Crown Prince Nalesoni Laifone (1859 – 6 June 1889), he was Crown Prince from 1885 until his death in 1889. Married Luseane Angaʻaefonu (1871–1941), eldest daughter of The Hon ʻInoke Fotu and Princess Lavinia Veiongo Mahanga, daughter of Laufilitonga, the 39th and last Tuʻi Tonga. This marriage produced no children, but he left two illegitimate daughters.

His second wife was Teisa Palu, daughter of Maheʻuliʻuli, 1st Fangupo, and his wife Levave. They had no children.

== Family tree ==
Tupou family tree

Tuʻi Haʻatakalaua line	Tuʻi Tonga line	Tuʻi Kanokupolu line
Kalolaine Fusimatalili	George Tupou I	Fīnau Kaunanga
Fifita Vavʻau	Tēvita ʻUnga	Sālote Mafile‘o Pilolevu	Filiaipulotu
Fusipala Taukiʻonetuku	Fatafehi Toutaitokotaha
Lavinia Veiongo	George Tupou II	ʻAnaseini Takipō
Viliami Tungī Mailefihi	Sālote Tupou III	Vīlai Tupou (illegitimate son)	Tupou Seini
Tāufaʻāhau Tupou IV	Halaevalu Mataʻaho ʻAhomeʻe	Siaosi 'Alipate Tupou, Baron Vaea	Tuputupu Ma'afu-'o-Tukuialahi
George Tupou V	Tupou VI	Nanasipauʻu Tukuʻaho
ʻIlima Lei Fifita Tohi (illegitimate daughter)	Tupoutoʻa ʻUlukalala	Sinaitakala Fakafanua
Taufaʻahau Manumataongo

- Fox, James J.; Sather, Clifford (1996). Origins, Ancestry and Alliance: Explorations in Austronesian Ethnography. Canberra: Department of Anthropology, Australian National University. p. 252. ISBN 978-0-7315-2432-7. OCLC 245762652.
- Kaeppler, Adrienne Lois; D.C. (2008). The Pacific Arts of Polynesia and Micronesia. Oxford: Oxford University Press. p. 90. ISBN 978-0-19-284238-1. OCLC 236158882.
- Völkel, Svenja (2010). Social Structure, Space and Possession in Tongan Culture and Language: An Ethnolinguistic Study. Amsterdam; Philadelphia: John Benjamins Publishing. p. 45. ISBN 978-90-272-0283-3.
- Wood-Ellem, Elizabeth (1999). Queen Sālote of Tonga: The Story of an Era 1900-1965. Auckland, N.Z: Auckland University Press. p. front. ISBN 978-0-8248-2529-4. OCLC 262293605.

== Bibliography ==
- Brenchley, Julius Lucius (1873). Jottings During the Cruise of H. M. S. Curac̜oa Among the South Seaislands in 1865. London: Longmans, Green, and Company.
- Garrett, John (1982). "Tonga: Wesleyan Kingdom". To Live Among the Stars: Christian Origins in Oceania. Suva, Fiji: Institute of Pacific Studies, University of the South Pacific. pp. 70–81. ISBN 978-2-8254-0692-2.
- Rutherford, Noel (1977). Friendly Islands: A History of Tonga. Oxford: Oxford University Press. ISBN 978-0-19-550519-1.
- Rutherford, Noel (2007). House-Girls Remember: Domestic Workers in Vanuatu. Honolulu: University of Hawaii Press. ISBN 978-0-8248-1856-2.
- Wood-Ellem, Elizabeth (1999). Queen Sālote of Tonga: The Story of an Era 1900–1965. Auckland, N.Z: Auckland University Press. ISBN 978-0-8248-2529-4. OCLC 262293605.

Political offices
New creation	Prime Minister of Tonga; 1 January 1876 – 18 December 1879	Vacant Title next held by Shirley Waldemar Baker
