= Lātūfuipeka Tukuʻaho =

Tongan princess (born 1983)

Princess Lātūfuipeka
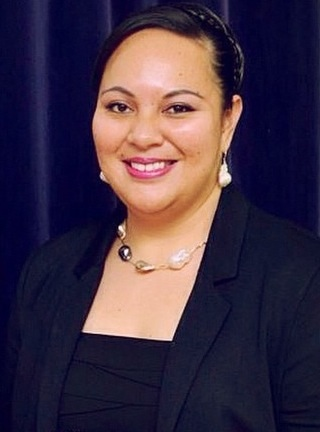
- Lātūfuipeka in 2013

Tongan High Commissioner to Australia
- Incumbent
- Assumed office 22 August 2012
- Monarch: Tupou VI
- Preceded by: Crown Prince Tupoutoʻa Lavaka
- Born: 17 November 1983 (age 42); Nukuʻalofa, Tonga
Names
- Angelika Lātūfuipeka Halaevalu Mataʻaho Napua-o-kalani Tukuʻaho
- House: Tupou
- Father: Tupou VI
- Mother: Nanasipau'u
- Religion: Methodism

Princess Lātūfuipeka (Angelika Lātūfuipeka Halaevalu Mataʻaho Napua-o-kalani Tukuʻaho; born 17 November 1983) is a Tongan royal and a member of the House of Tupou. The only daughter of Tupou VI, King of Tonga, Princess Lātūfuipeka was appointed Tonga's high commissioner to Australia on 22 August 2012, after her father, the previous high commissioner, acceded the throne.

== Family and early life ==
=== Family ===
She is the sole daughter and eldest child of Tupou VI, King of Tonga and Queen Nanasipau'u. Her middle name is her grandmother's name, Her Late Majesty Queen Mother Halaevalu Mata'aho. She has two brothers, the Crown Prince Tupoutoʻa ʻUlukalala and Prince Ata, who is the youngest. She is in the line of succession to the Tongan throne. The princess will inherit the prestigious title of Princess Royal of Tonga once her paternal aunt, Princess Pilolevu, passes away.

=== Education ===
She was educated at Queen Salote College (Kolofo'ou, Tongatapu, Tonga) and the Tonga Side School. In 2004, she graduated with a Bachelor of Business Administration from Geneva International University, Geneva, Switzerland. The Princess also graduated with a master's degree in management in 2010 and a follow-on master's of business in 2011 at the Australian National University, Canberra, ACT, Australia

=== Occupation ===
The princess worked as administrator at the Tonfön/TV Group of companies (Shoreline Group) from 2004 to 2008. She has held the post of High Commissioner of Tonga to Australia since 22 August 2012.

As of 25 July 2019 she is the Non-Resident Ambassador Extraordinary and Plenipotentiary to the Republic of the Philippines.

=== Duties ===
On 5 July 2015, she hosted a luncheon in honour for the coronation of her parents at Matakieua Villa which was attended by the Tongan Royal Family, Tongan nobility, members of the Tongan Government, foreign heads of royal houses, foreign royalty and foreign diplomats.

== Patronages ==
She is Patron of:

- Tonga National Youth Congress (TNYC).
- Tonga Football Association (TFA).
- Tonga National Leadership Development Forum (TNLDF).

She is Member of:

- Young Tongan Traditional Leaders (YTTL).

== Honours ==
- Tonga: Knight Grand Cross with Collar of the Order of Queen Salote Tupou III (KGCCQS)

Lātūfuipeka Tukuʻaho House of Tupou Born: 17 November 1983
Lines of succession
Preceded by Prince Ata	Succession to the Tongan throne 7th position	Succeeded by Princess Salote Tuita
Diplomatic posts
Preceded by Prince Tupoutoʻa Lāvaka	Tongan High Commissioner to Australia; 22 August 2012 – present	Incumbent
