= Sitiveni Tuku'aho =

HSH Prince Tungi
- Prince of Tonga
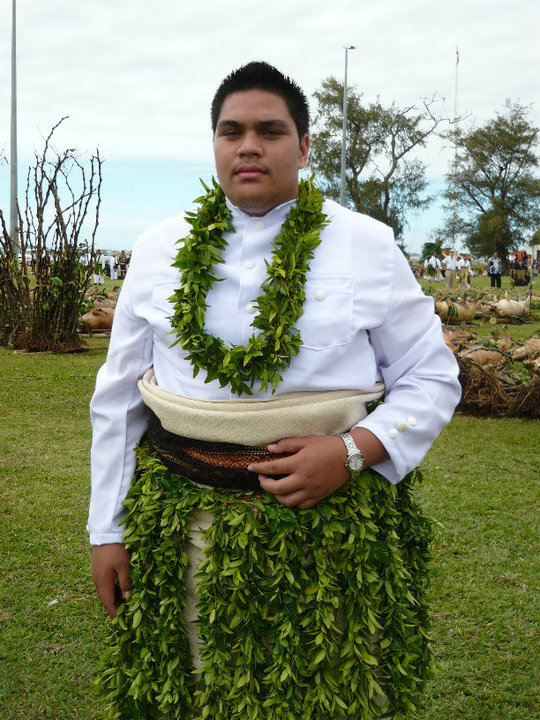
- Installment of Prince Tungi's title in 2008
- Born: Sitiveni Polu Le'uligana Tuku'aho; 25 June 1990 (age 35); Royal Palace, Nukuʻalofa, Tonga
Names
- HSH Prince Tungi, nee the Honourable Sitiveni Polu Le'uligana
- House: Tupou
- Father: Prince Fatafehi 'Alaivahamama'o Tuku'aho
- Mother: Hon. Alaileula Tuku'aho
- Religion: Methodism

Sitiveni Polu Le'uligana Tuku'aho (also known as Prince Tungi) (born 25 June 1990) is a Tongan Prince and member of the Tongan Royal Family.

== Early life ==
Tungi is the eldest son of Prince Fatafehi 'Alaivahamama'o Tuku'aho and the Hon. Alaileula Tuku'aho. He was educated at Tonga College and Wesley College, Auckland before training to be a pilot. He currently resides as a bachelor in the United States of America.

== Title and estate ==
Tungi is of high rank in both Tonga and Samoa, having hailed from both Tongan and Samoan Royalty. He is the grandson of the late King of Tonga Tāufaʻāhau Tupou IV and the great-grandson of the late Head of State of Samoa Malietoa Tanumafili II.

The "Tungi" title is one of Tonga's most prestigious and high ranking royal titles and was last held by the late King Taufa'ahau Tupou IV before he ascended the throne in 1965. Upon the passing of his father Fatafehi 'Alaivahamama'o Tuku'aho, the Honourable Sitiveni Polu Le'uligana inherited the title of HSH Prince Tungi in 2008 which was instated by the late King George Tupou V.

Tungi's estate consists of Tatakamotonga, Fua'amotu, Navutoka.

== Duties ==
Tungi often represents His Majesty King Tupou VI in an official capacity for Tongan functions and events.

In 2008, Tungi was appointed Lord Bearer of the Crown for the late King George Tupou V's coronation.

In 2009, Tungi was sent by the Tongan government as part of the special emissaries donating to the Samoan Government with $500,000 to the Independent State of Samoa and $100,000 to the Government of American Samoa which was struck after the devastation from the Tsunami.

In 2013, Tungi was a guest of honour for The Queen's Commonwealth Trusts baton relay. He later visited the Granville Youth and Community Centre in Australia to promote Tongan cultural practices overseas whilst also supporting the Tongan community within Australia.

As of 2021, Tungi resides in the United States. He visited the Polynesian Cultural Center in Hawa'ii in May 2021.

== Honours ==
National honours

- Order of the Crown of Tonga, Grand Cross (31 July 2008).
