= Falevai =

Coordinates: 18.707553°S 174.034295°W

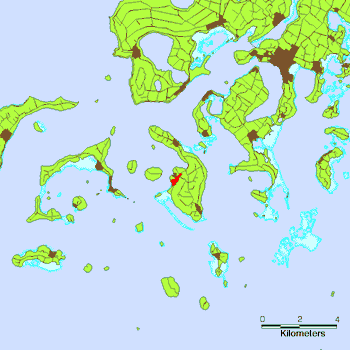

Falevai is a settlement in the Vava'u islands in Tonga. The name Falevai, if translated into English means "water house." The name was given because of how the seas and the oceans surrounding the houses. Falevai's most famous names are lafa 'i tua and kuli fe kai. The settlement is also part of a 2.29 km^{2} Special Management Conservation Area. In 2014, there was a return of the traditional art of tapa-making in the village after decades of it being lost.

== See also ==
- List of cities in Tonga
