= Tupou VI =

King of Tonga since 2012

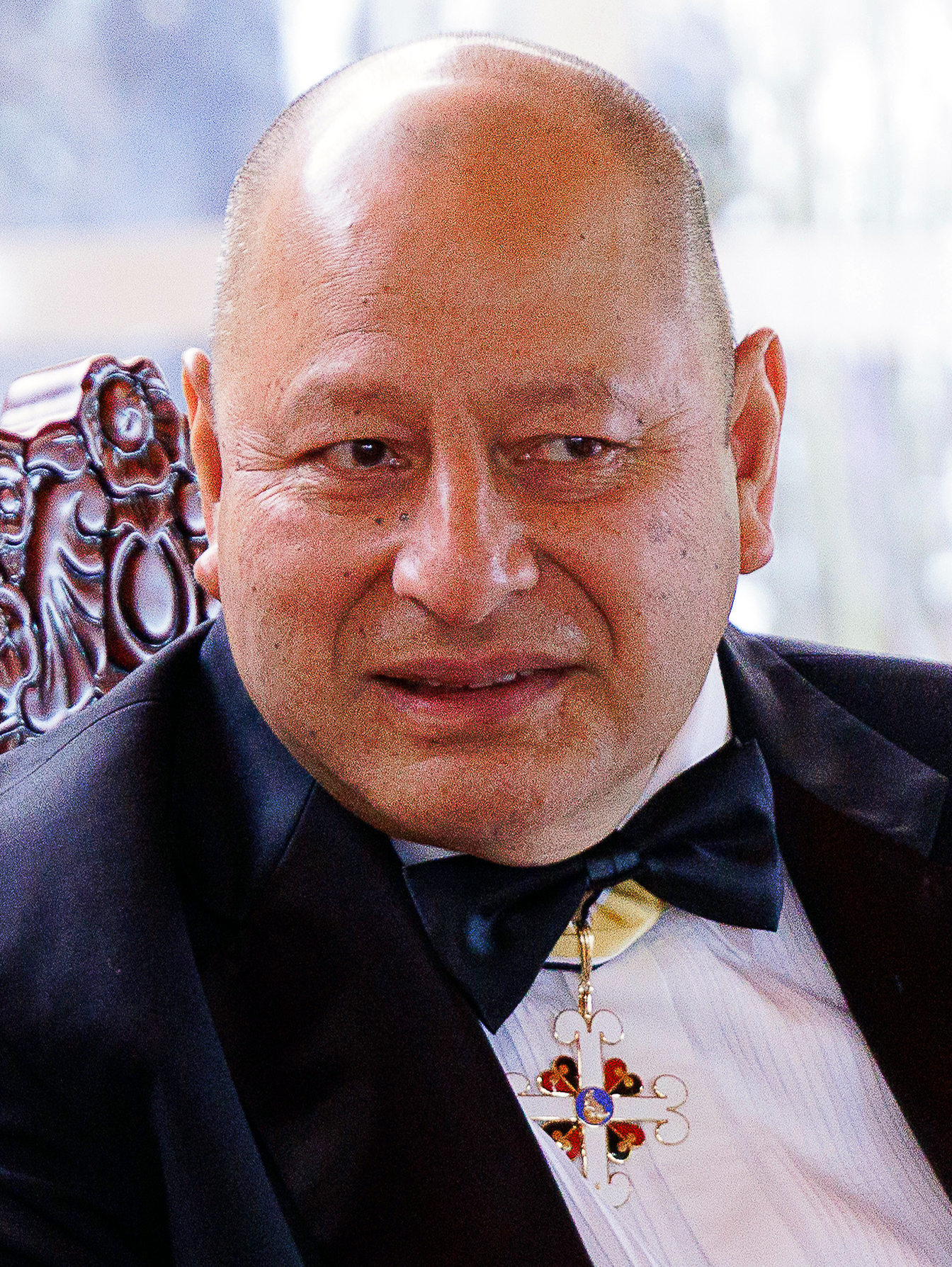
- Tupou in 2025

King of Tonga
- Reign: 18 March 2012 – present
- Coronation: 4 July 2015
- Predecessor: George Tupou V
- Heir apparent: Tupoutoʻa ʻUlukalala

Prime Minister of Tonga
- In office 3 January 2000 – 11 February 2006
- Monarch: Tāufaʻāhau Tupou IV
- Preceded by: Baron Vaea
- Succeeded by: Feleti Sevele

Tongan High Commissioner to Australia
- In office 15 August 2008 – 18 March 2012
- Monarch: George Tupou V
- Preceded by: Position established
- Succeeded by: Lātūfuipeka Tukuʻaho

Tongan Ambassador to Japan
- In office 15 January 2010 – 18 March 2012
- Monarch: George Tupou V
- Preceded by: Position established
- Succeeded by: Lātūfuipeka Tukuʻaho
- Born: 12 July 1959 (age 67); Nukuʻalofa, Tonga
- Spouse: Nanasipauʻu Vaea (m. 1982)
- Issue: Princess Lātūfuipeka Tukuʻaho; Crown Prince Tupoutoʻa ʻUlukalala; Prince Ata
Names
- ʻAhoʻeitu ʻUnuakiʻotonga Tukuʻaho
- House: Tupou dynasty
- Father: Tāufaʻāhau Tupou IV
- Mother: Halaevalu Mataʻaho ʻAhomeʻe
- Religion: Free Wesleyan Church
- Education: University of East Anglia; University of New South Wales; Bond University

Tupou VI (ʻAho‘eitu ʻUnuakiʻotonga Tukuʻaho; 12 July 1959) is King of Tonga. He acceded the throne in 2012 and was previously Prime Minister of Tonga from 2000 to 2006.

The youngest child of king Tāufaʻāhau Tupou IV, he served as a military officer, politician and diplomat. Shortly after resigning as prime minister, he became heir presumptive on the accession of his elder brother George Tupou V, who had no legitimate issue. In 2008, he was appointed Tonga's High Commissioner to Australia and resided in Canberra until his accession upon the death of King George Tupou V. His coronation took place in 2015.

Key events in Tupou VI's reign have included the 2022 Hunga Tonga–Hunga Haʻapai eruption and tsunami and a constitutional crisis resulting from his dismissal of members of Prime Minister Siaosi Sovaleni's cabinet.

== Early life and education ==
ʻAhoʻeitu was born in Nukuʻalofa, Tonga on 12 July 1959, as the third son and youngest child of Crown Prince Tupoutoʻa Tungī (later King Tāufaʻāhau Tupou IV) and Crown Princess (later Queen) Halaevalu Mataʻaho ʻAhomeʻe. He attended The Leys School in Cambridge from 1973 to 1977, followed by enrollment at the University of East Anglia, where he studied development studies between 1977 and 1980.

== Military career ==
ʻAhoʻeitu joined the naval arm of the Tonga Defence Services in 1982, achieving the rank of Lieutenant-Commander by 1987. He graduated from the US Naval War College as part of Class 33 in 1988.

His military service included commanding the Pacific-class patrol boat VOEA Pangai from 1990 to 1995, during which he participated in peacekeeping operations in Bougainville. Then, he obtained a master's degree in defence studies from the University of New South Wales in 1997 and another master's degree in international relations from Bond University in 1999.

== Governmental career ==
In 1989, ʻAhoʻeitu (then known as Prince Lavaka Ata) was bestowed with the noble title of ʻUlukālala, granting him the title of Prince ʻUlukālala Lavaka Ata. In 1998, Lavaka Ata transitioned from his military career to government service, assuming dual roles as defence minister and foreign minister until August 2004. These roles were previously held by his elder brother, then-crown prince Tupoutoʻa, who held a dispute with the king over democratic reforms and ultimately resigned to pursue his business interests.

== Prime Minister of Tonga ==
Lavaka Ata assumed the role of prime minister on 3 January 2000, following the resignation of his father-in-law Baron Vaea. His appointment was seen as unexpected, given that his elder brother had been expected to inherit the position. Lavaka Ata was described as a conservative who was closely affiliated with the Free Wesleyan Church of Tonga and was opposed to the pro-democracy movement then gaining ground domestically.

In 2004, several Members of Parliament (MPs) advocated for his resignation as prime minister following their decision to boycott the inauguration of the Tonga Legislative Assembly. Among the MPs was Feleti Sevele, who cited the closure of Royal Tongan Airlines as one of several adverse events associated with the prime minister's tenure. Sevele questioned the prime minister's ability to govern Tonga, asserting that an inability to manage an airline raised doubts about his capacity to govern the country effectively.

Lavaka Ata resigned as prime minister on 11 February 2006. His departure coincided with a period of heightened civil unrest, as pro-democracy protests advocating for a reduced governmental role of the royal family gained traction from mid-2005 onward. The Nukuʻalofa riots later that year underscored a growing dissatisfaction with the existing political structure, calls for increased political representation and a more equal distribution of power.

== Crown Prince and diplomatic career ==
Following King Tāufaʻāhau Tupou IV's death in early September 2006, he was formally confirmed as Crown Prince of Tonga in his capacity as heir presumptive on 27 September. He acquired the noble title of Tupoutoʻa, traditionally reserved for the crown prince, and was subsequently known by the title of Tupoutoʻa Lavaka. His other noble titles of ʻUlukālala of Fangatongo and ʻAta of Hihifo subsequently passed to each of his two sons.

Tupoutoʻa Lavaka took on the position of the chief of mission for Tonga's High Commission in Canberra when it was inaugurated in 2008, a position he held until his accession to the throne in 2012. This move represented a notable development in Tonga's diplomatic relations with Australia, highlighting the establishment of a formal diplomatic presence. Concurrently, he served as a non-resident ambassador to Japan from 15 January 2010, when he presented his credentials to Emperor Akihito.

== Reign ==
=== Accession and coronation ===
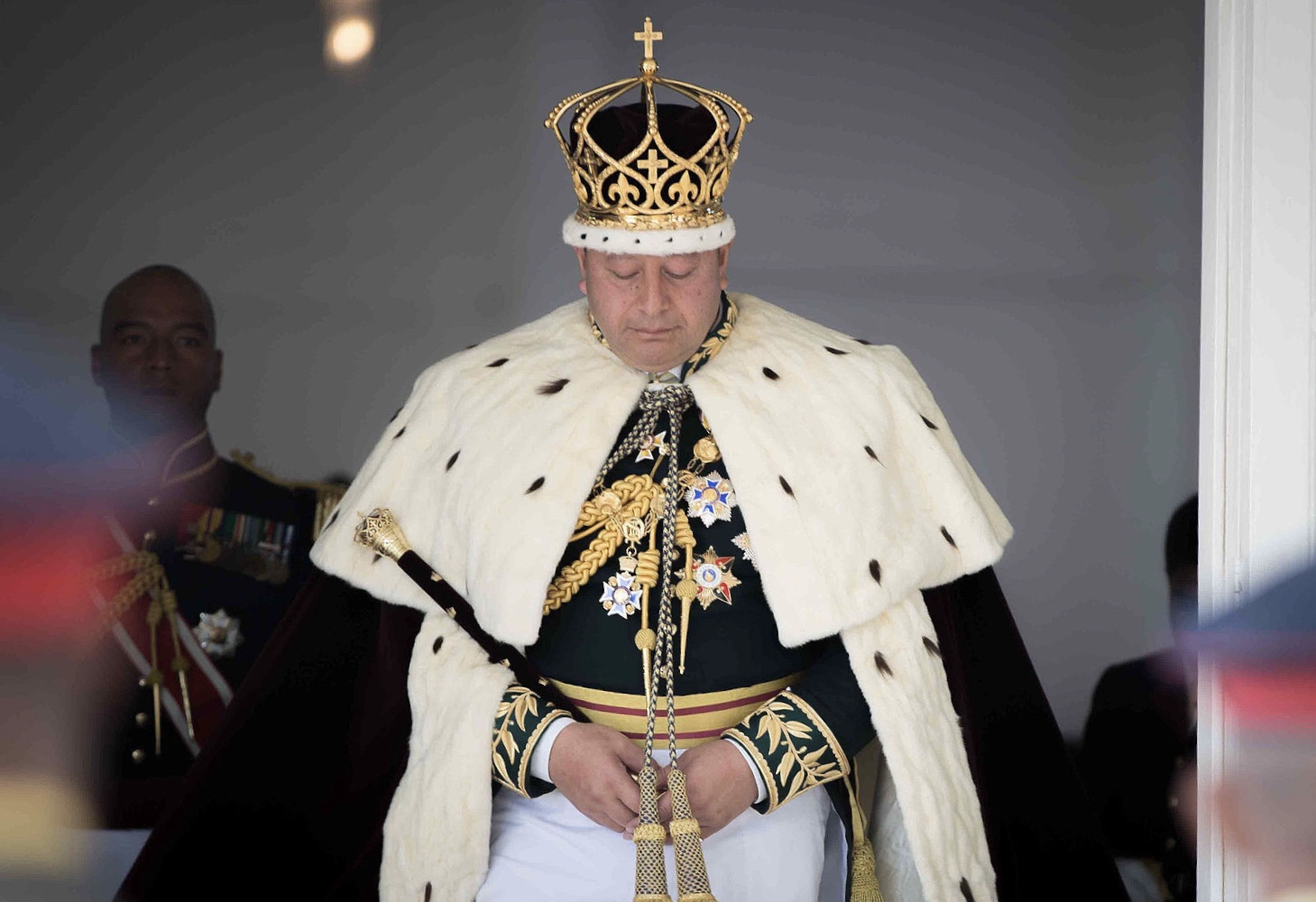
King Tupou VI after his coronation ceremony in Nukuʻalofa on 4 July 2015

Tupoutoʻa Lavaka acceded the throne on the death of his elder brother, George Tupou V, on 18 March 2012, taking the regnal name of Tupou VI. In his capacity as Tonga's head of state, he was installed as 20th Chancellor of the University of the South Pacific (USP) for a term of one year during the USP Tonga Graduation ceremony in July 2013.

King Tupou VI and Queen Nanasipau’u were crowned in a ceremony conducted at Centenary Church in Nukuʻalofa on 4 July 2015 by the Reverend D'Arcy Wood, a retired Uniting Church in Australia minister who was born in Tonga. He was assisted by the Reverend ʻAhio and the Reverend Tevita Havea, the president and the secretary general of the Free Wesleyan Church of Tonga. About 15,000 guests attended the celebration.

During the ceremony, Tupou VI was anointed with holy oil, adorned with a ring, and presented with a sceptre. The crown was then placed on his head by Wood, who performed the anointing and crowning as a matter of circumventing the taboo on native Tongans touching the King's head. The celebrations ran for a total of eleven days, beginning a week before the ceremony, with the date of the coronation itself being declared a national public holiday.

=== Dismissal of government ===
On 25 August 2017, Tupou VI dismissed Prime Minister ʻAkilisi Pōhiva, dissolved the Legislative Assembly, and ordered early elections to be held by mid-November. Following the king's dissolution of the government, the speaker, Lord Tuʻivakanō, issued a statement explaining his advice to the King that led him to dismiss the Prime Minister. Lord Tuʻivakanō stated that Pōhiva had made unconstitutional moves, including signing international agreements without the King's consent. Pōhiva was reelected soon after in November.

=== Hunga Tonga–Hunga Haʻapai eruption and tsunami ===
On 15 January 2022, the King was temporarily relocated from the Royal Palace following the eruption of Hunga Tonga–Hunga Haʻapai and the ensuing tsunami. After this, he called for unity and vowed to rebuild.

=== Loss of confidence in ministers ===
On 2 February 2024, Prime Minister Siaosi Sovaleni was absent from Tonga, receiving medical treatment in New Zealand. During this time, King Tupou VI purportedly revoked the appointment of Siaosi Sovaleni as the armed forces minister and Fekitamoeloa ʻUtoikamanu as the minister of foreign affairs and tourism, with the nine noble MPs (Note: There are 9 MPs elected by the 33 hereditary nobles of Tonga.) urging them to resign from their ministerial positions. The Attorney General of Tonga, Linda Folaumoetu'i, advised the Cabinet that the King's action was unconstitutional.

In response to the revocation of their appointments, Sovaleni and ʻUtoikamanu publicly announced their resignation from their respective ministerial positions in April 2024.

== Marriage and issue ==
ʻAhoʻeitu married Nanasipauʻu Vaea, a daughter of Baron Vaea, on 9 December 1982, with the marriage vows taking place two days later. They have three children:

- Princess Lātūfuipeka Tukuʻaho (Angelika Lātūfuipeka Halaevalu Mataʻaho Napua-o-kalani Tukuʻaho; born 17 November 1983), who has been the High Commissioner to Australia since 22 August 2012.
- Crown Prince Tupoutoʻa ʻUlukalala (Siaosi Manumataongo ʻAlaivahamamaʻo ʻAhoʻeitu Konstantin Tukuʻaho; born 17 September 1985). He married his second cousin, Sinaitakala Fakafanua, on 12 July 2012. They have four children: Prince Taufaʻahau Manumataongo (born 10 May 2013), Princess Halaevalu Mataʻaho (born 12 July 2015), Princess Nanasipauʻu (born 20 March 2018), and Princess Salote Mafile’o Pilolevu (born 25 February 2021).
- Prince Ata (Viliami ʻUnuaki-ʻo-Tonga Mumui Lalaka-Mo-e-ʻEiki Tukuʻaho; born 27 April 1988).

== Family tree ==
Tupou family tree

Tuʻi Haʻatakalaua line	Tuʻi Tonga line	Tuʻi Kanokupolu line
Kalolaine Fusimatalili	George Tupou I	Fīnau Kaunanga
Fifita Vavʻau	Tēvita ʻUnga	Sālote Mafile‘o Pilolevu	Filiaipulotu
Fusipala Taukiʻonetuku	Fatafehi Toutaitokotaha
Lavinia Veiongo	George Tupou II	ʻAnaseini Takipō
Viliami Tungī Mailefihi	Sālote Tupou III	Vīlai Tupou (illegitimate son)	Tupou Seini
Tāufaʻāhau Tupou IV	Halaevalu Mataʻaho ʻAhomeʻe	Siaosi 'Alipate Tupou, Baron Vaea	Tuputupu Ma'afu-'o-Tukuialahi
George Tupou V	Tupou VI	Nanasipauʻu Tukuʻaho
ʻIlima Lei Fifita Tohi (illegitimate daughter)	Tupoutoʻa ʻUlukalala	Sinaitakala Fakafanua
Taufaʻahau Manumataongo

- Fox, James J.; Sather, Clifford (1996). Origins, Ancestry and Alliance: Explorations in Austronesian Ethnography. Canberra: Department of Anthropology, Australian National University. p. 252. ISBN 978-0-7315-2432-7. OCLC 245762652.
- Kaeppler, Adrienne Lois; D.C. (2008). The Pacific Arts of Polynesia and Micronesia. Oxford: Oxford University Press. p. 90. ISBN 978-0-19-284238-1. OCLC 236158882.
- Völkel, Svenja (2010). Social Structure, Space and Possession in Tongan Culture and Language: An Ethnolinguistic Study. Amsterdam; Philadelphia: John Benjamins Publishing. p. 45. ISBN 978-90-272-0283-3.
- Wood-Ellem, Elizabeth (1999). Queen Sālote of Tonga: The Story of an Era 1900-1965. Auckland, N.Z: Auckland University Press. p. front. ISBN 978-0-8248-2529-4. OCLC 262293605.

== See also ==
- Tonga
- Succession to the Tongan throne
- List of current heads of state and government

== Footnotes ==
Tupou VI House of Tupou Born: 12 July 1959
Political offices
Preceded by Baron Vaea; Acting	Minister of Foreign Affairs; 1998–2004	Succeeded by Sonatane Tuʻa Taumoepeau-Tupou
Preceded by Vaea	Prime Minister of Tonga; 2000–2006	Succeeded by Feleti Sevele
Diplomatic posts
New office	High Commissioner to Australia; 2008–2012	Succeeded by Lātūfuipeka Tukuʻaho
New office	Ambassador of Tonga to Japan; 2010–2012	Succeeded by Tania Laumanulupe Tupou
Regnal titles
Preceded by George Tupou V	King of Tonga; 2012–present	Incumbent; Heir apparent: Tupoutoʻa ʻUlukalala
