= Julius Brenchley =

British explorer

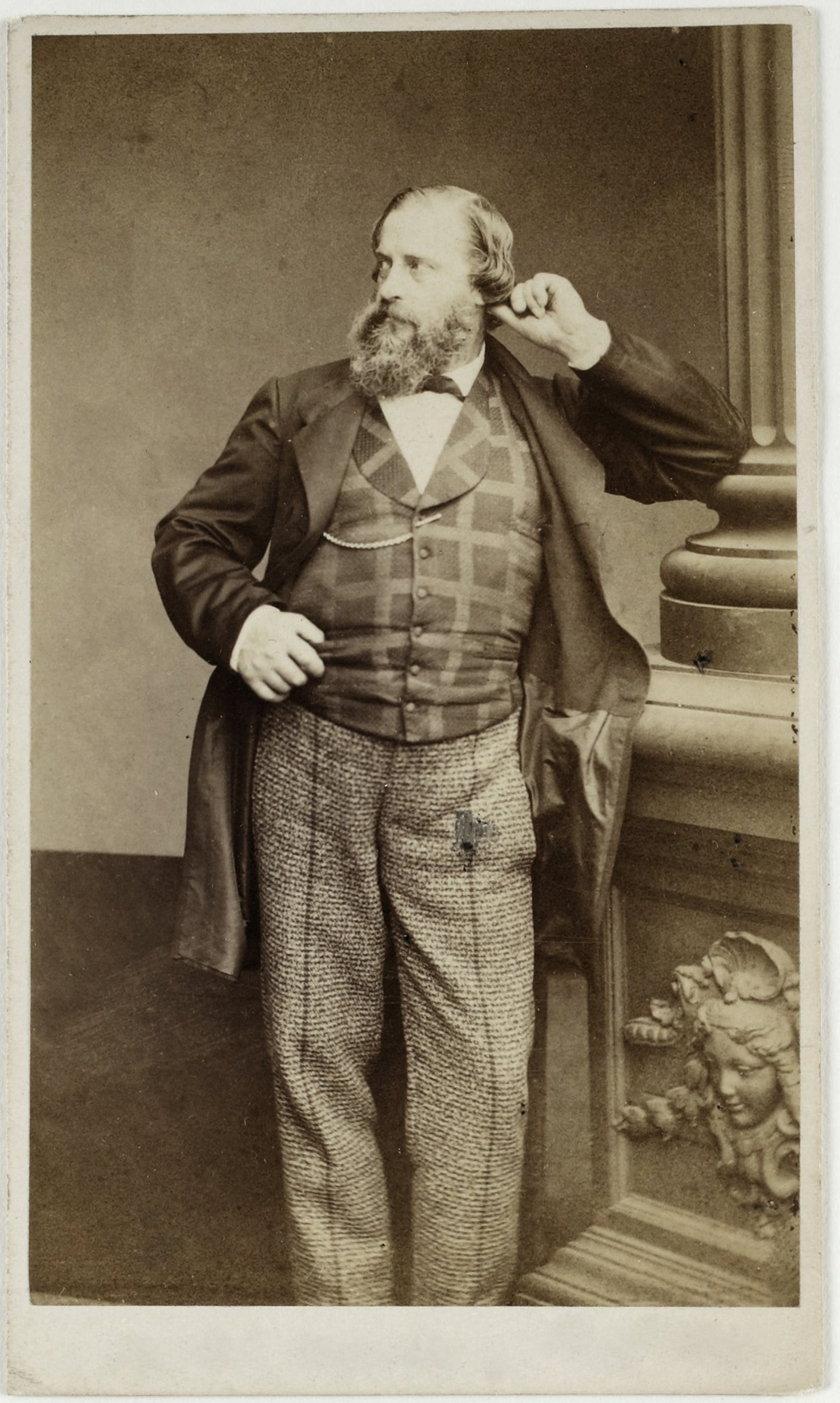
- Brenchley in 1862 by Adam-Salomon
- Born: 30 November 1816; Maidstone,
- Died: 24 February 1873 (aged 56); Folkestone
- Occupation: naturalist

Julius Lucius Brenchley (30 November 1816 – 24 February 1873), of Maidstone, was a 19th-century English explorer, naturalist and author.

== Life ==
Born at Kingsley House, Maidstone, Kent, Julius Brenchley was educated at Maidstone Grammar School and then St John's College, Cambridge. He was set for a life in the Church, having been ordained at Holy Trinity, Maidstone, in 1843. However, in 1845, his father persuaded Brenchley to accompany him on a European tour, and he was bitten by the travel bug. From 1845 to 1867 he travelled the world, collecting, recording and sending material home. He was a passionate collector of art, ethnography and natural history, and was called a "gentleman explorer". Travelling the globe in search of knowledge and adventure, he sent many artefacts from his travels home which are now on display in Maidstone museum. A park adjacent to the museum, Brenchley Gardens, is named after him to honour his contributions, both cultural and financial, to the museum. During his travels, Brenchley visited every continent except Antarctica. He was especially active in the South Seas.

Brenchley spent much of his adult life exploring the world in his tireless search for knowledge. His life was shaped by his "passionate love of wandering". He never got married because he was too busy exploring.

He died aged only 56, on February 24, 1873 in a Folkestone hotel and is buried in the family vaults at All Saints' Church, Maidstone. He is known as a pre-eminent adventurer of his time.

== Tributes ==
A public park in Maidstone is named Brenchley Gardens in his honour.

Julius Brenchley is commemorated in the scientific name of a species of Chinese lizard, Eremias brenchleyi.

== Publications ==
Brenchley published at least two books:

- A Journey to Great Salt Lake City, 1861
- Jottings during the cruise of H.M.S. Curac̜oa among the South Sea Islands in 1865, 1873
