= Taufaʻahau Manumataongo =

Prince of Tonga (born 2013)

Tāufaʻāhau Manumataongo
- Prince of Tonga
- Born: 10 May 2013 (age 13); Auckland City Hospital, Grafton, Auckland, New Zealand
- House: Tupou
- Father: Prince Tupouto'a 'Ulukalala
- Mother: Princess Sinaitakala

Prince Tāufaʻāhau Manumataongo Tukuʻaho (born 10 May 2013) is a member of the Tongan royal family, second in the line of succession to the Tongan throne as the eldest child and only son of Crown Prince Tupoutoʻa ʻUlukalala. Tāufaʻāhau is the eldest grandson of the current King of Tonga, Tupou VI.

== Early years ==
Taufaʻahau was born on 10 May 2013 at Auckland City Hospital, the teaching hospital of University of Auckland in Grafton, Auckland, the son of Crown Prince Tupoutoʻa ʻUlukalala and Crown Princess Sinaitakala, during the reign of his grandfather King Tupou VI.

He has three younger sisters: Princess Halaevalu Mataʻaho (born 12 July 2014); Princess Nanasipauʻu Eliana (born 20 March 2018); Princess Salote Mafileʻo Pilolevu (born 25 February 2021).

== Family tree ==
Tupou family tree

Tuʻi Haʻatakalaua line	Tuʻi Tonga line	Tuʻi Kanokupolu line (Members: Tupouto and Hoamofaleono)
Kalolaine Fusimatalili	George Tupou I	Fīnau Kaunanga
Fifita Vavʻau	Tēvita ʻUnga	Sālote Mafile‘o Pilolevu	Filiaipulotu
Fusipala Taukiʻonetuku	Fatafehi Toutaitokotaha
Lavinia Veiongo	George Tupou II	ʻAnaseini Takipō
Viliami Tungī Mailefihi	Sālote Tupou III	Vīlai Tupou (illegitimate son)	Tupou Seini
Tāufaʻāhau Tupou IV	Halaevalu Mataʻaho ʻAhomeʻe	Siaosi 'Alipate Tupou, Baron Vaea	Tuputupu Ma'afu-'o-Tukuialahi
George Tupou V (ʻIlima Lei Fifita Tohi daughter of him, which is married to Tulutulumafua-ʻi-Olotele Kalaniuvalu, with whom she had three children)	Tupou VI	Nanasipauʻu Tukuʻaho
Tupoutoʻa ʻUlukalala	Sinaitakala Fakafanua
Taufaʻahau Manumataongo

- Fox, James J.; Sather, Clifford (1996). Origins, Ancestry and Alliance: Explorations in Austronesian Ethnography. Canberra: Department of Anthropology, Australian National University. p. 252. ISBN 978-0-7315-2432-7. OCLC 245762652.
- Kaeppler, Adrienne Lois; D.C. (2008). The Pacific Arts of Polynesia and Micronesia. Oxford: Oxford University Press. p. 90. ISBN 978-0-19-284238-1. OCLC 236158882.
- Völkel, Svenja (2010). Social Structure, Space and Possession in Tongan Culture and Language: An Ethnolinguistic Study. Amsterdam; Philadelphia: John Benjamins Publishing. p. 45. ISBN 978-90-272-0283-3.
- Wood-Ellem, Elizabeth (1999). Queen Sālote of Tonga: The Story of an Era 1900-1965. Auckland, N.Z: Auckland University Press. p. front. ISBN 978-0-8248-2529-4. OCLC 262293605.

Taufaʻahau Manumataongo House of Tupou Born: 10 May 2013
Lines of succession
Preceded by The Crown Prince	Line of succession to the Tongan throne 2nd position	Succeeded by Princess Halaevalu Mataʻaho
