= Vuna Takitakimālohi =

- Crown Prince of Tonga
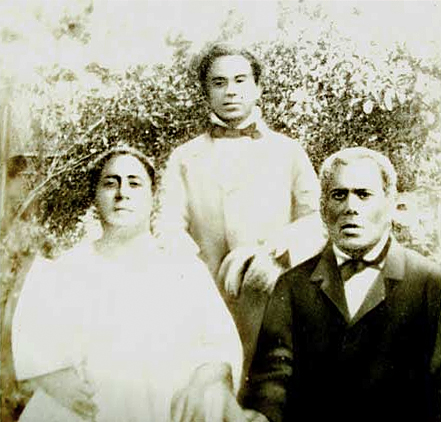
- Prince Vuna and his parents
- Born: c. 1844
- Died: January 1862; Royal Palace, Nukuʻalofa, Tonga
Names
- Siaosi (George) Vuna Takitakimālohi
- House: House of Tupou
- Father: George Tupou I
- Mother: Sālote Lupepauʻu
- Religion: Methodist

Siaosi Vuna Takitakimālohi (c. 1844 – January 1862) was a Prince of Tonga, the only legitimate son and heir to King George Tupou I.

== Life ==
Born around 1844, he was the only surviving son of Tongan King George Tupou I and Sālote Lupepauʻu, Tupou's sole legitimate wife. His only full-blooded brother Tu'ukitau had died at the age of four in 1842. He was named Siaosi or George after his father, who in turn had taken the name in honor of King George III of the United Kingdom while his mother was named Sālote or Charlotte after Queen Charlotte of Mecklenburg-Strelitz. Prince Vuna's half-siblings include Tēvita ʻUnga and Sālote Mafileʻo Pilolevu, who were repudiated by their father as illegitimate offspring along with their mothers, who were his secondary consorts, after his marriage in 1834 to Prince Vuna's mother under Christian rites. His mother was the former wife of Laufilitonga, the last Tuʻi Tonga, and his maternal great-great-grandmother was Nanasipauʻu, who held the high rank of Tuʻi Tonga Fefine.

At the age of seventeen or eighteen, Prince Vuna died in January 1862, unmarried, leaving his father without an heir. His death was greatly mourned by the people of Tonga. At the prince's funeral, the King allowed his subjects to restore the traditional rite of tukuofo, the offering of mats and food to the dead. This gesture prompted the presiding Reverend William George Richard Stephinson to openly reprimand the King and discipline the native participants resulting in a brief rift between the King and the Wesleyan Church. The succession would remain vacant for thirteen years until the promulgation of Tonga's first constitution in 1875, which legitimized Vuna's half-brother Tēvita ʻUnga and named him Crown Prince. King Tupou I would outlive ʻUnga and all three of his grandchildren; he was succeeded by his great-grandson George Tupou II.

== Bibliography ==
- Rodman, Margaret; Rutherford, Noel (2007). Rutherford: Shirley Baker/Tonga. Honolulu: University of Hawaii Press. ISBN 978-0-8248-1856-2.
- Spurway, John (2015). Ma'afu, Prince of Tonga, Chief of Fiji: A Life of Fiji's First Tui Lau. Canberra: Australian National University Press. ISBN 978-1-925021-18-9. OCLC 879538614. Archived from the original on 2015-07-16.
- Wood-Ellem, Elizabeth (1999). Queen Sālote of Tonga: The Story of an Era 1900-1965. Auckland, N.Z: Auckland University Press. ISBN 978-0-8248-2529-4. OCLC 262293605.

Royal titles
New title	Crown Prince of Tonga; 1845–1862	Vacant Title next held by Tēvita ʻUnga
