= Lavinia Veiongo =

Queen Consort of Tonga from 1899 to 1902

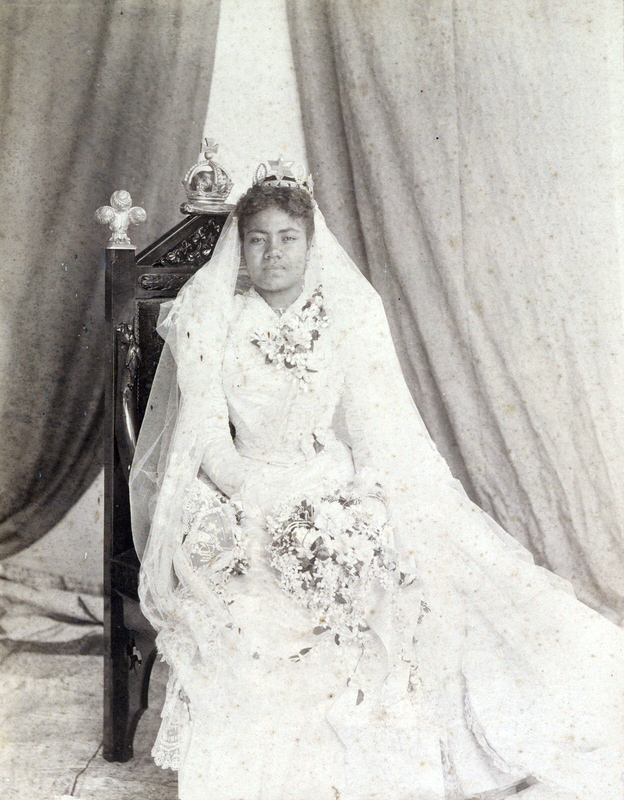
- Queen Lavinia on her wedding day

Queen consort of Tonga
- Tenure: 1 June 1899 – 24 April 1902
- Born: 9 February 1879
- Died: 24 April 1902 (aged 23); Royal Palace, Nukuʻalofa, Tonga
- Burial: Malaʻekula
- Spouse: George Tupou II (m. 1899)
- Issue: Sālote Tupou III
Names
- Lavinia Veiongo Fotu
- House: House of Tupou
- Father: ʻAsipeli Kupuavanua Fotu
- Mother: Tōkanga Fuifuilupe

Lavinia Veiongo Fotu (9 February 1879 – 24 April 1902) was Queen of Tonga from 1899 to 1902 as the first wife of George Tupou II.

== Life ==
Lavinia Veiongo was born on 9 February 1879. Her father was the Hon. ʻAsipeli Kupuavanua Fotu, who served as Minister of Police, and her mother was Tōkanga Fuifuilupe, a daughter of Pita Fotofili, Noble of Niuafo'ou. She was a namesake of her paternal grandmother, Old Lavinia, who was the daughter of the last Tuʻi Tonga Laufilitonga and considered one of the highest ranking women in Tonga.

King George Tupou II was expected to marry Princess ʻOfakivavaʻu, of the Tuʻi Kanokupolu line. However, the King changed his mind at the last minute and chose Lavinia instead. He asked the Council of Chiefs to choose between the two women, but when the majority voiced support for ʻOfa, he threatened to remain a bachelor unless he was allowed to marry Lavinia. The chiefs acquiesced and allowed the marriage to go through. The royal marriage took place on 1 June 1899 with Tongan and European guests in attendance. During the ceremony the King placed a golden crown on Lavinia's head and proclaimed her as Queen of Tonga. Despite this, relation between the King and the rest of the country remained strained because of the rejection of ʻOfa. Supporters of both women rioted in the streets of the capital of Nukuʻalofa, attacking each other with axes, clubs, and broken bottles.

In 1900, Lavinia gave birth to their only child Princess Sālote Mafile‘o Pilolevu, who would succeed her father as Queen Sālote Tupou III. Despite the infighting between their respective supporters, Lavinia and the Princess 'Ofa became close friends. Princess 'Ofa died in December 1901 from tuberculosis. Lavinia had visited her friend at her final illness and also attended her funeral and subsequently contracted the disease. She died on 24 April 1902 at the Royal Palace. After lying in state and a royal funeral, her remains were buried at the royal burial grounds of Malaʻekula. King Tupou II greatly mourned the passing of his wife and erected a marble monument in her honor on the burial site.

== Family tree ==
Tupou family tree

Tuʻi Haʻatakalaua line	Tuʻi Tonga line	Tuʻi Kanokupolu line (Members: Tupouto and Hoamofaleono)
Kalolaine Fusimatalili	George Tupou I	Fīnau Kaunanga
Fifita Vavʻau	Tēvita ʻUnga	Sālote Mafile‘o Pilolevu	Filiaipulotu
Fusipala Taukiʻonetuku	Fatafehi Toutaitokotaha
Lavinia Veiongo	George Tupou II	ʻAnaseini Takipō
Viliami Tungī Mailefihi	Sālote Tupou III	Vīlai Tupou (illegitimate son)	Tupou Seini
Tāufaʻāhau Tupou IV	Halaevalu Mataʻaho ʻAhomeʻe	Siaosi 'Alipate Tupou, Baron Vaea	Tuputupu Ma'afu-'o-Tukuialahi
George Tupou V (ʻIlima Lei Fifita Tohi daughter of him, which is married to Tulutulumafua-ʻi-Olotele Kalaniuvalu, with whom she had three children)	Tupou VI	Nanasipauʻu Tukuʻaho
Tupoutoʻa ʻUlukalala	Sinaitakala Fakafanua
Taufaʻahau Manumataongo

- Fox, James J.; Sather, Clifford (1996). Origins, Ancestry and Alliance: Explorations in Austronesian Ethnography. Canberra: Department of Anthropology, Australian National University. p. 252. ISBN 978-0-7315-2432-7. OCLC 245762652.
- Kaeppler, Adrienne Lois; D.C. (2008). The Pacific Arts of Polynesia and Micronesia. Oxford: Oxford University Press. p. 90. ISBN 978-0-19-284238-1. OCLC 236158882.
- Völkel, Svenja (2010). Social Structure, Space and Possession in Tongan Culture and Language: An Ethnolinguistic Study. Amsterdam; Philadelphia: John Benjamins Publishing. p. 45. ISBN 978-90-272-0283-3.
- Wood-Ellem, Elizabeth (1999). Queen Sālote of Tonga: The Story of an Era 1900-1965. Auckland, N.Z: Auckland University Press. p. front. ISBN 978-0-8248-2529-4. OCLC 262293605.

== Bibliography ==
- Wood-Ellem, Elizabeth (1999). Queen Sālote of Tonga: The Story of an Era 1900–1965. Auckland, New Zealand: Auckland University Press. ISBN 978-0-8248-2529-4. OCLC 262293605.
- Wood-Ellem, Elizabeth (2007). Tonga and the Tongans: Heritage and Identity. Alphington, Victoria: Tonga Research Association. ISBN 978-0-646-47466-3. OCLC 174101821.

Preceded by Sālote Lupepauʻu	Queen consort of Tonga; 1899–1902	Succeeded by ʻAnaseini Takipō
