= Tupoutoʻa ʻUlukalala =

Crown prince of Tonga

- Crown Prince of Tonga
- Tupoutoʻa in 2026

Minister of Foreign Affairs
- Incumbent
- Assumed office 28 January 2025
- Prime Minister: ʻAisake Eke; Fatafehi Fakafānua
- Preceded by: Samiu Vaipulu (acting)
- Born: 17 September 1985 (age 41); Nukuʻalofa, Tonga
- Spouse: Sinaitakala Fakafanua (m. 2012)
- Issue: Prince Taufaʻahau Manumataongo; Princess Halaevalu Mataʻaho; Princess Nanasipauʻu Eliana; Princess Salote Mafile’o Pilolevu
Names
- Siaosi Manumataongo ʻAlaivahamamaʻo ʻAhoʻeitu Konstantin Tukuʻaho
- House: Tupou
- Father: Tupou VI
- Mother: Nanasipauʻu
- Religion: Methodism

Tupoutoʻa ʻUlukalala, Crown Prince of Tonga (Siaosi Manumataongo ʻAlaivahamamaʻo ʻAhoʻeitu Konstantin Tukuʻaho; born 17 September 1985) is the heir apparent to the Tongan throne. He is the elder son and second child of King Tupou VI and Queen Nanasipauʻu. Since January 2025, he has served as minister of foreign affairs and minister for His Majesty's Armed Forces.

== Early life and education ==
Tukuʻaho was born on 17 September 1985 in Nukuʻalofa. He was educated at Australian National University, graduating with a Master of Military and Defence Studies in 2018 and a Master of Diplomacy in 2021.

== Crown Prince of Tonga ==
Tupoutoʻa ʻUlukalala became heir apparent to the throne in March 2012 upon the accession of his father, Tupou VI, as King of Tonga. He was subsequently bestowed with the noble title of Tupoutoʻa.

=== Government minister ===
On 28 January 2025, Tupoutoʻa was appointed foreign minister and minister for His Majesty's Armed Forces to Prime Minister ʻAisake Eke's cabinet. He was the only noble in the Eke Cabinet. Tupoutoʻa was concurrently appointed as a member of parliament by the prime minister along with three other cabinet ministers. He was retained as foreign minister in the cabinet of Prime Minister Fatafehi Fakafānua when he took office in December.

== Marriage ==
On 12 July 2012, Crown Prince Tupoutoʻa ʻUlukalala married his double second cousin, Sinaitakala Fakafanua, in a wedding attended by 2,000 people. He was 26 years old at the time, while his wife was 25 years old. Sinaitakala Fakafanua is 26th in line to the Tongan throne.

The wedding marked the first marriage of a Tongan crown prince in sixty-five years. The ceremony was held at the Centennial Church of the Free Church of Tonga in Nuku'alofa, with more than 2,000 guests, including Samoan and Fijian chiefly families. The groom wore morning dress, while the bride wore a long-sleeved, lace wedding gown with a veil that reached the floor of the church. A Maʻutohi ceremony, which celebrates the issuance of a marriage license, was held earlier in the week.

The marriage between the Crown Prince and Fakafanua caused controversy over the continued practice of marrying closely related cousins. Tongan royal protocol requires that members of the royal family only marry members of noble families to maintain a 'strong' bloodline. All royal marriages are arranged.

The wedding between the cousins was openly criticised by a few members of Tongan political and royal circles. Two prominent members of the Tongan royal family, Queen mother Halaevalu Mataʻaho ʻAhomeʻe and the king's sister, Princess Royal Salote Pilolevu Tuita, disapproved of the marriage and refused to attend the ceremony. Daughter of the Princess Royal of Tonga, Hon. Frederica Tuita, who is ninth in line to the throne, openly condemned the union, calling the royal arranged marriage "extremely arrogant and only perpetuated the motive behind social climbers". Pro-democracy leader ʻAkilisi Pohiva also criticised the wedding, telling TVNZ, "They are too close... I do not know about biological effects of two close bloods mixed together, but I think they need new blood from outside." A leader of Tongans living in New Zealand, Will Ilolahia, stated that many Tongans opposed the second cousins' marriage, but were unwilling to speak out publicly.

A maternal uncle of the Crown Prince, Lord Vaea, defended the marriage saying, "It's a new beginning for the royal household. They are both in their twenties, we are looking at that to preserve that constitutional monarchy within Tonga."

=== Issue ===
Tupoutoʻa ʻUlukalala and Sinaitakala Fakafanua have four children:

- Prince Taufaʻahau Manumataongo, who is second in line to the throne, born 10 May 2013 at Auckland City Hospital;
- Princess Halaevalu Mataʻaho, born 12 July 2014 at Auckland City Hospital;
- Princess Nanasipauʻu Eliana, born 20 March 2018 at Auckland City Hospital;
- Princess Salote Mafileʻo Pilolevu, born 25 February 2021 at Calvary Public Hospital Bruce in Canberra.

== Honours ==
=== National ===
- Tonga: Knight Grand Cross with Collar of the Royal Order of Pouono
- Tonga: Knight Grand Cross with Collar of the Order of Queen Salote Tupou III
- Tonga: Knight Grand Cross of the Order of the Crown of Tonga
- Tonga: Recipient of the King Tupou VI Coronation Medal

=== Dynastic ===
- (Kingdom of the Two Sicilies) Royal House of Two Sicilies: Knight Grand Cross of the Royal Order of Francis I

== Family tree ==
Tupou family tree

Tuʻi Haʻatakalaua line	Tuʻi Tonga line	Tuʻi Kanokupolu line
Kalolaine Fusimatalili	George Tupou I	Fīnau Kaunanga
Fifita Vavʻau	Tēvita ʻUnga	Sālote Mafile‘o Pilolevu	Filiaipulotu
Fusipala Taukiʻonetuku	Fatafehi Toutaitokotaha
Lavinia Veiongo	George Tupou II	ʻAnaseini Takipō
Viliami Tungī Mailefihi	Sālote Tupou III	Vīlai Tupou (illegitimate son)	Tupou Seini
Tāufaʻāhau Tupou IV	Halaevalu Mataʻaho ʻAhomeʻe	Siaosi 'Alipate Tupou, Baron Vaea	Tuputupu Ma'afu-'o-Tukuialahi
George Tupou V	Tupou VI	Nanasipauʻu Tukuʻaho
ʻIlima Lei Fifita Tohi (illegitimate daughter)	Tupoutoʻa ʻUlukalala	Sinaitakala Fakafanua
Taufaʻahau Manumataongo

- Fox, James J.; Sather, Clifford (1996). Origins, Ancestry and Alliance: Explorations in Austronesian Ethnography. Canberra: Department of Anthropology, Australian National University. p. 252. ISBN 978-0-7315-2432-7. OCLC 245762652.
- Kaeppler, Adrienne Lois; D.C. (2008). The Pacific Arts of Polynesia and Micronesia. Oxford: Oxford University Press. p. 90. ISBN 978-0-19-284238-1. OCLC 236158882.
- Völkel, Svenja (2010). Social Structure, Space and Possession in Tongan Culture and Language: An Ethnolinguistic Study. Amsterdam; Philadelphia: John Benjamins Publishing. p. 45. ISBN 978-90-272-0283-3.
- Wood-Ellem, Elizabeth (1999). Queen Sālote of Tonga: The Story of an Era 1900-1965. Auckland, N.Z: Auckland University Press. p. front. ISBN 978-0-8248-2529-4. OCLC 262293605.

== See also ==
- List of current heirs apparent

Tupoutoʻa ʻUlukalala House of Tupou Born: 17 September 1985
Lines of succession
First Heir apparent	Succession to the Tongan throne 1st position	Succeeded by Taufaʻahau Manumataongo
Political offices
Preceded by Samiu Vaipulu as Acting minister	Minister of Foreign Affairs; 2025–present	Incumbent
