= Baron Vaea =

Prime Minister of Tonga from 1991 to 2000

The Honourable Baron Vaea of Houma
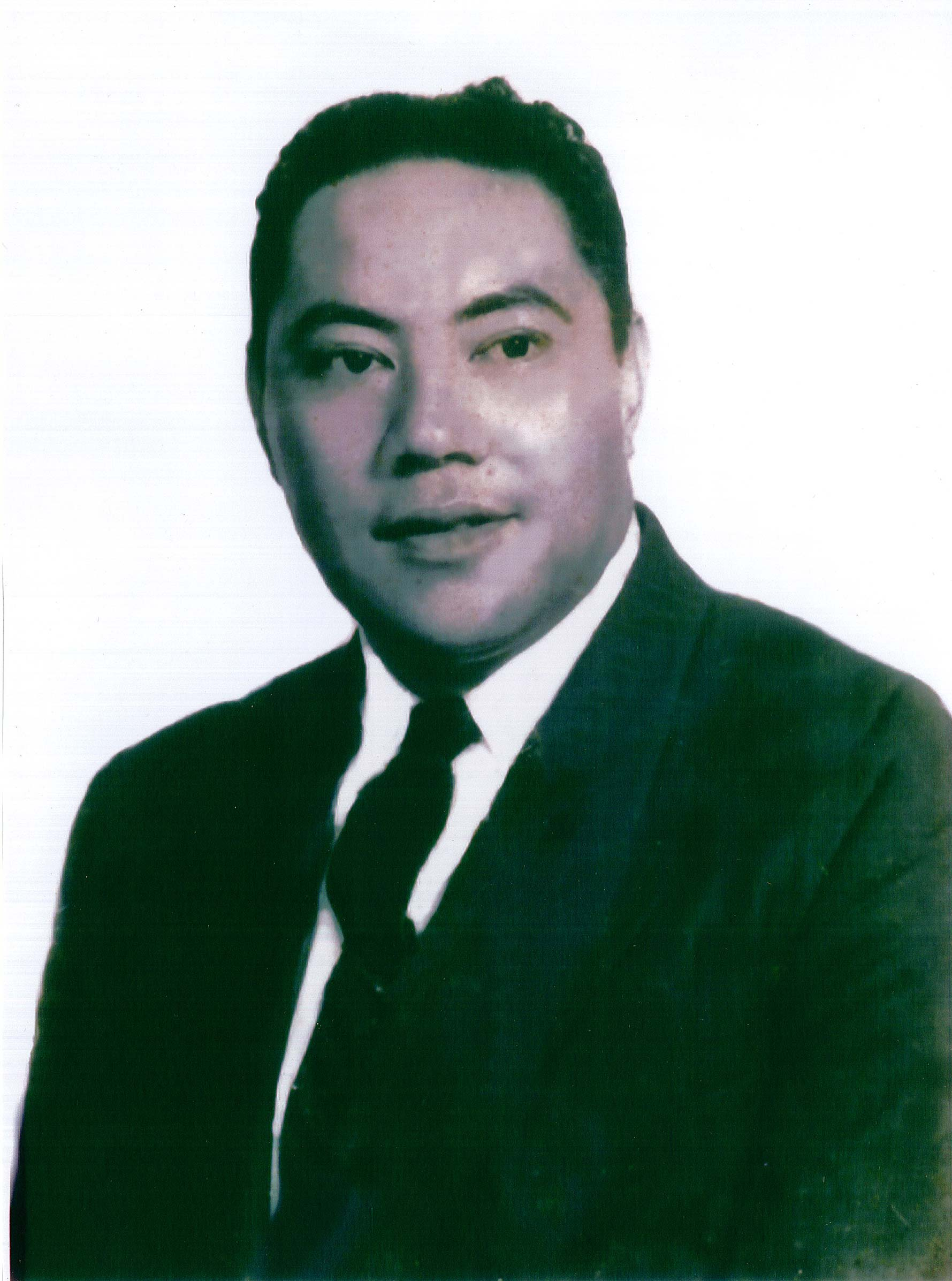

Prime Minister of Tonga
- In office 22 August 1991 – 3 January 2000
- Monarch: Tāufaʻāhau Tupou IV
- Deputy: Langi Kavaliku
- Preceded by: Prince Fatafehi Tuʻipelehake
- Succeeded by: Prince ʻUlukālala Lavaka Ata

High Commissioner of Tonga to the United Kingdom
- In office 1969–1972
- Preceded by: Position created

Personal details
- Born: 15 May 1921 Kingdom of Tonga
- Died: 7 June 2009 (aged 88) Houma, Tongatapu, Tonga
- Party: Independent
- Spouse: Baroness Tuputupu Vaea
- Children: Nanasipauʻu Tukuʻaho ʻAlipate Tuʻivanuavou Vaea
- Parent(s): Vīlai Tupou; Tupou Seini
- Military career
- Branch: Royal New Zealand Air Force
- Service years: 1942–1945
- Conflicts: World War II

Siaosi ʻAlipate Halakilangi Tau’alupeoko Vaea Tupou, Baron Vaea of Houma (15 May 1921 – 7 June 2009), was a Tongan politician and noble who served as Prime Minister of Tonga from 1991 to 2000. Vaea was a nephew of Queen Sālote Tupou III and the father of the current Queen of Tonga, Nanasipauʻu Tukuʻaho.

Vaea's career in the Tongan government spanned 54 years. He had previously served as Tonga's first High Commissioner to the United Kingdom from 1969 until 1972, as well as in various ministerial posts from 1972 until his appointment as prime minister by King Tāufaʻāhau Tupou IV in 1991.

== Biography ==
=== Early life ===
Siaosi ʻAlipate Halakilangi Tau’alupeoko Vaea Tupou was born on 15 May 1921 to parents Vīlai Tupou and Tupou Seini. His father, Vīlai Tupou, was the half brother of Queen Sālote, while his mother, Tupou Seini, was the daughter of a Tongan nobleman named Vaea. He attended Wesley College, Auckland, from 1938 until 1941. He enlisted in the Royal New Zealand Air Force following his graduation from high school and the outbreak of World War II. Vaea served as a pilot in the Air Force from 1942 until 1945 piloting PBY Catalina reconnaissance flying boats.

=== Government career ===
Vaea began working for the government of Tonga in January 1945 following his departure from the Royal New Zealand Air Force. He served his aunt, Queen Sālote, as Aide-de-Camp from 1953 until 1958.

He became the Governor of Ha'apai in 1960, a position he held until 1968. He became Tonga's first High Commissioner to the United Kingdom from 1969 until 1972. While High Commissioner he was given the title of Baron.

He was appointed to numerous government ministerial portfolios in the Tongan Cabinet beginning in 1972. Vaea was appointed as Tonga's first Minister of Labour and Commerce, and Industries, which he held from 1972 until 1991. As labour minister, Vaea was responsible for the construction of the Small Industries Centre in Ma'ufanga.

Vaea was simultaneously appointed Minister of Agriculture and Forestry in 1975, a position which he continued to hold until his official retirement from government in 2000. Additionally, Vaea also headed the Tongan Ministries of Civil Aviation, Tourism, Education and Marine and Ports, at various points during his career.

=== Prime Minister of Tonga ===
Baron Vaea of Houma applied for retirement from government and civil service in the early 1990s. However, soon after submitting his retirement application, King Tāufaʻāhau Tupou IV appointed Vaea as Prime Minister of Tonga. Vaea's predecessor, Fatafehi Tu'ipelehake had resigned from office in 1991 due to declining health. He took office on 22 August 1991, becoming the 12th prime minister of Tonga since 1876.

Vaea served as prime minister under King Taufa’ahau Tupou IV from 1991 and 2000. He attended the inaugural Pacific Alliance Leaders Meeting (PALM) in 1997, a gathering of Pacific Islands Forum nations spearheaded by Japan to enhance cooperation between the Japanese and Pacific Islands governments. Each of Vaea's successors has attended following meetings since 1997.

Vaea's resignation from office was accepted by King Taufa'ahau Tupou IV in 2000, and Vaea was able to retire from government at the age of 78. With a career in the Tongan government and civil service spanning 54 years, Vaea remains one of Tonga's longest serving civil servants.

=== Later life ===
In an interview with Matangi Tonga during his retirement, Vaea expressed concern for a number of issues affecting Tonga, including the decreasing supplies of the country's fresh water supplies, the environment, the need for additional capital funds and the negative outlook of many Tongan young people. He also stated that the government should encourage Tongans to enter the business world. Vaea seemed to encourage progress and change in Tonga saying in the interview, "Sometimes I think it would be best if Tonga changed, . . . we should let go of some of our beliefs and the way that we do things that seem to weigh us down."

=== Death ===
Baron Vaea died at his residence, 'Tali ki Ha'apai', in Houma, Tongatapu, Tonga, on 7 June 2009, at approximately 10 pm He was 88 years old. Vaea had sought medical treatment in New Zealand, before returning to Tonga in late May 2009. He had been bedridden since May. Vaea's body was kept at his home in Houma until his funeral.

Baron Vaea of Houma was survived by his wife, Baroness Tuputupu Vaea, as well as five of their six children and one adopted daughter. The couple's children are HM Queen Nanasipauʻu Tukuʻaho, 'Alipate Tu'ivanuavou Vaea, 'Amelia Luoluafetu'u Vaea, Luseane Luani and Cassandra Tuku'aho (of Tu'ivanuavou Vaea). Vaea was predeased by two sons, Moimoikimofuta Kaifahina Vaea and Ratu Edward Vaea.

Vaea's funeral began at 11 am on 13 June 2009. A funeral procession commenced from his residence, called Tali ki Ha'apai, in Houma, to nearby Kolomanatau Cemetery for funeral ceremonies and burial.

Dignitaries in attendance included King George Tupou V, Princess Pilolevu Tuita and other members of the Tongan royal family. Several foreign heads of state also attended including the former O le Ao o le Malo of Samoa Tupua Tamasese Efi, his wife, Masiofo Filifilia Imo, and the then Vice-President of Fiji Ratu Epeli Nailatikau.

Tongan historian Elizabeth Wood-Ellem noted that Baron Vaea of Houma remained highly respected by the Tongan people throughout his life, "They certainly held him in enormous respect."

=== Succession ===
Baron Vaea's son ʻAlipate Tuʻivanuavou Vaea was bestowed the title Lord Vaea shortly after his father's death.

== Family tree ==
Tupou family tree

Tuʻi Haʻatakalaua line	Tuʻi Tonga line	Tuʻi Kanokupolu line
Kalolaine Fusimatalili	George Tupou I	Fīnau Kaunanga
Fifita Vavʻau	Tēvita ʻUnga	Sālote Mafile‘o Pilolevu	Filiaipulotu
Fusipala Taukiʻonetuku	Fatafehi Toutaitokotaha
Lavinia Veiongo	George Tupou II	ʻAnaseini Takipō
Viliami Tungī Mailefihi	Sālote Tupou III	Vīlai Tupou (illegitimate son)	Tupou Seini
Tāufaʻāhau Tupou IV	Halaevalu Mataʻaho ʻAhomeʻe	Siaosi 'Alipate Tupou, Baron Vaea	Tuputupu Ma'afu-'o-Tukuialahi
George Tupou V	Tupou VI	Nanasipauʻu Tukuʻaho
ʻIlima Lei Fifita Tohi (illegitimate daughter)	Tupoutoʻa ʻUlukalala	Sinaitakala Fakafanua
Taufaʻahau Manumataongo

- Fox, James J.; Sather, Clifford (1996). Origins, Ancestry and Alliance: Explorations in Austronesian Ethnography. Canberra: Department of Anthropology, Australian National University. p. 252. ISBN 978-0-7315-2432-7. OCLC 245762652.
- Kaeppler, Adrienne Lois; D.C. (2008). The Pacific Arts of Polynesia and Micronesia. Oxford: Oxford University Press. p. 90. ISBN 978-0-19-284238-1. OCLC 236158882.
- Völkel, Svenja (2010). Social Structure, Space and Possession in Tongan Culture and Language: An Ethnolinguistic Study. Amsterdam; Philadelphia: John Benjamins Publishing. p. 45. ISBN 978-90-272-0283-3.
- Wood-Ellem, Elizabeth (1999). Queen Sālote of Tonga: The Story of an Era 1900-1965. Auckland, N.Z: Auckland University Press. p. front. ISBN 978-0-8248-2529-4. OCLC 262293605.

== Honours ==
National honours

- Order of Queen Sālote Tupou III, Grand Cross with Collar (31 July 2008).

Political offices
Preceded by Fatafehi Tu'ipelehake	Prime Minister of Tonga; 1991–2000	Succeeded by ʻAhoʻeitu ʻUnuakiʻotonga Tukuʻaho (ʻUlukālala Lavaka Ata)
