= Baroness Tuputupu Vaea =

Tonga noblewoman and royal (1928–2021)

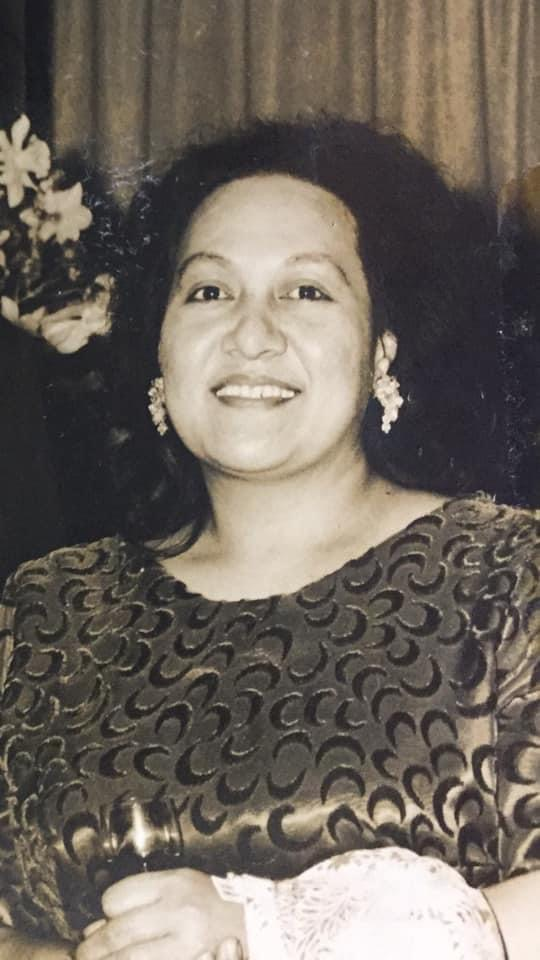
- Born: 14 October 1928; Tonga
- Died: 29 July 2021 (aged 92); Houma, Tongatapu, Tonga
- Burial place: Kolomanatau Cemetery, Houma, Tongatapu
- Spouse: Baron Vaea (died 2009)
- Children: Seven, including Queen Nanasipauʻu Tukuʻaho ʻAlipate Tuʻivanuavou Vaea
- Parents: Sosaia Lausi‘i Ma’afu (father); ‘Anau-ki he-Sina Sunia Mafile’o (mother)

Tuputupu -‘o-Pulotu Vaea, The Honourable Baroness Tuputupu ‘o Pulotu Vaea of Houma (née Ma'afu-'o-Tukuialahi; 14 October 1928 – 29 July 2021) was a Tongan noblewoman and royal. Vaea and her late husband, former Prime Minister of Tonga Baron Vaea (1921–2009), are the parents of the present Queen of Tonga, Queen Nanasipau'u. She was the mother-in-law of the present King of Tonga, Tupou VI.

She was the eldest daughter of Siosaia Lausi’i, 7th Ma’afu-’o- Tukui’aulahi, of Vaini and his wife, ’Anaukihesina Lamipeti.

The baroness and her late husband, Baron Vaea, had seven children and one adopted daughter: Queen Nanasipauʻu Tukuʻaho, 'Alipate Tu'ivanuavou Vaea, 'Amelia Luoluafetu'u Vaea, Luseane Luani (Dowager Lady Luani) and Cassandra Vaea (formerly Tuipelehake). Two sons, Moimoikimofuta Kaifahina Vaea, Ratu Edward Vaea, are deceased.

== Family tree ==
Tupou family tree

Tuʻi Haʻatakalaua line	Tuʻi Tonga line	Tuʻi Kanokupolu line
Kalolaine Fusimatalili	George Tupou I	Fīnau Kaunanga
Fifita Vavʻau	Tēvita ʻUnga	Sālote Mafile‘o Pilolevu	Filiaipulotu
Fusipala Taukiʻonetuku	Fatafehi Toutaitokotaha
Lavinia Veiongo	George Tupou II	ʻAnaseini Takipō
Viliami Tungī Mailefihi	Sālote Tupou III	Vīlai Tupou (illegitimate son)	Tupou Seini
Tāufaʻāhau Tupou IV	Halaevalu Mataʻaho ʻAhomeʻe	Siaosi 'Alipate Tupou, Baron Vaea	Tuputupu Ma'afu-'o-Tukuialahi
George Tupou V	Tupou VI	Nanasipauʻu Tukuʻaho
Tupoutoʻa ʻUlukalala	Sinaitakala Fakafanua
Taufaʻahau Manumataongo

- Fox, James J.; Sather, Clifford (1996). Origins, Ancestry and Alliance: Explorations in Austronesian Ethnography. Canberra: Department of Anthropology, Australian National University. p. 252. ISBN 978-0-7315-2432-7. OCLC 245762652.
- Kaeppler, Adrienne Lois; D.C. (2008). The Pacific Arts of Polynesia and Micronesia. Oxford: Oxford University Press. p. 90. ISBN 978-0-19-284238-1. OCLC 236158882.
- Völkel, Svenja (2010). Social Structure, Space and Possession in Tongan Culture and Language: An Ethnolinguistic Study. Amsterdam; Philadelphia: John Benjamins Publishing. p. 45. ISBN 978-90-272-0283-3.
- Wood-Ellem, Elizabeth (1999). Queen Sālote of Tonga: The Story of an Era 1900-1965. Auckland, N.Z: Auckland University Press. p. front. ISBN 978-0-8248-2529-4. OCLC 262293605.
