= Viliami Tungī Mailefihi =

Tongan prince and chieftain (1888–1941)

Prince Viliami Tungī Mailefihi
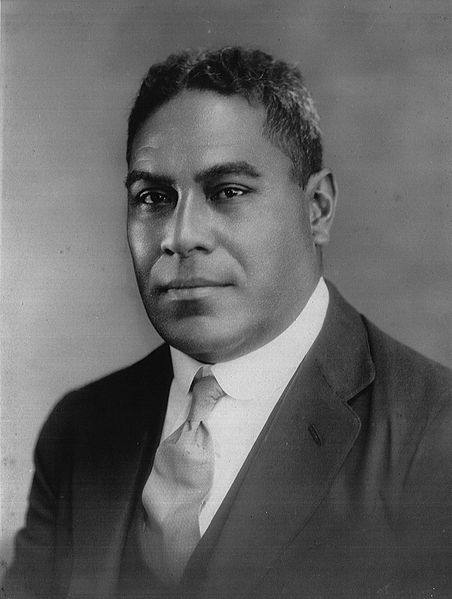
- Prince Tungi in 1930

Prince consort of Tonga
- Tenure: 5 April 1918 – 20 July 1941

Prime Minister of Tonga
- In office: 30 June 1923 – 20 July 1941
- Monarch: Sālote Tupou III
- Predecessor: Tevita Tuʻivakano
- Successor: Solomone Ula Ata
- Born: 1 November 1888; Tonga
- Died: 20 July 1941 (aged 52); Tonga
- Burial: Malaʻekula Royal Tombs
- Spouse: Sālote Tupou III (m. 1917)
- Issue: Tāufaʻāhau Tupou IV; Prince Uiliami Tuku‘aho; Prince Sione Fatafehi Tu'ipelehake
- House: Tuʻi Haʻatakalaua
- Father: Siaosi Tukuʻaho
- Mother: Mele Siuʻilikutapu

Viliami Tungī Mailefihi CBE (1 November 1888 – 20 July 1941) was a Tongan high chieftain and Prince of Tonga as the husband of Queen Sālote Tupou III. He served as Prime Minister of Tonga from 1923 until his death in 1941.

== Biography ==
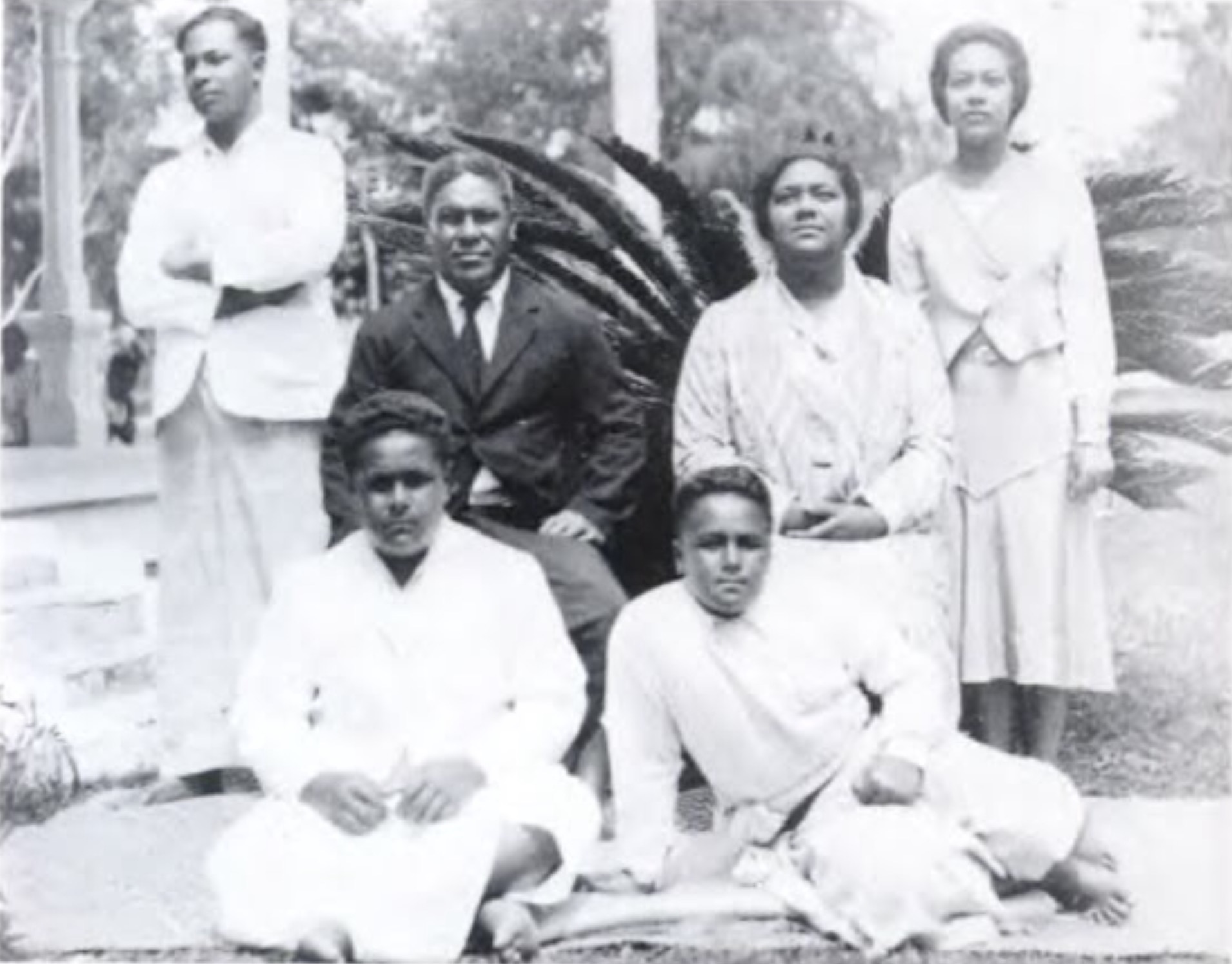
The Royal Family of Tonga, Circa 1930. centre: Prince Tungī and Queen Sālote; left & front: their 3 sons Prince Taufa'ahau, Prince Sione and Prince Tuku'aho; right: The Queen's sister, Princess Fusipala

Prince Tungi was the son of Siaosi Tukuʻaho (Lord Tungi of Tatakamotonga), who served as Prime Minister of Tonga from to 1890 to 1893. Tungī's grandfather was Tungī Halatuituia. The line of Tungī chiefs hailed from the exalted village of Tatakamotonga. They were descended from the defunct line of Tuʻi Haʻatakalaua High Chiefs, who in that time were more or less seen as deputy rulers under the Tuʻi Tong Kings. As such, they had a fiercely loyal following among the people of Muʻa if not from the whole Hahake district of Tongatapu Island. His mother, Lady Mele Siuʻilikutapu was the granddaughter of the Tuʻi Vavaʻu: Fīnau ʻUlukālala III (Tuapasi). As the nephew of the young and unmarried King Siaosi Tupou II, Tungi was the heir presumptive to the throne until the birth of King Siaosi's first child, Princess Sālote, in 1900. In 1911 Prince Tungi represented the Tongan king at the coronation of King George V in London.

Tungī was educated at Tupou College, Tonga and Newington College, Sydney, commencing in 1896, aged nine. He was one of seven Tongan nobles to attend Newington at the time. He was a follower of the Wesleyan Methodist Church.

He was selected by King Siaosi Tupou II to marry his elder daughter and heiress presumptive, Princess Sālote. The King favored this match even though she was 12 years younger than Tungi. The Christian wedding ceremony took place on 19 September 1917. The traditional Tongan matrimonial ceremony (known as the Tu'uvala) was celebrated on 21 September. In less than a year, King Siaosi Tupou II would die and his daughter (The Princess Sālote) would be crowned as the regnant Queen of Tonga.

The opening years of Queen Salote's reign were fraught with political difficulties. There was a schism between the two branches of the Methodist Church; and a republican movement threatened to unseat the fledgling monarch. The personality and high status of Prince Tungi helped to elevate the esteem of the people toward their young queen.

One of the most eminent accomplishments (contributed by Queen Salote and Prince Tungi) was the births of their children. Between them, The Queen and her Consort carried the blood of all three ancient royal dynasties: the Tu'i Tonga, the Tu'i Ha'atakalaua and the Tu'i Kanokupolu. Their son (The Prince Tuku'aho) died in 1936. However, the other two sons (The Prince Taufa'ahau and The Prince Sione) carried and passed on the combined bloodlines of the three ancient royal dynasties.

Prince Tungi served as his wife's Prime Minister from 1923 until his death in 1941. His own experience helped him to train The Queen in the vocation of kingship and government. His death in 1941 during the Second World War was a devastating blow to Queen Salote and yet like Britain's Queen Victoria, she learned to serve her people in spite of her grief and loss.

== Family tree ==
Tupou family tree

Tuʻi Haʻatakalaua line	Tuʻi Tonga line	Tuʻi Kanokupolu line
Kalolaine Fusimatalili	George Tupou I	Fīnau Kaunanga
Fifita Vavʻau	Tēvita ʻUnga	Sālote Mafile‘o Pilolevu	Filiaipulotu
Fusipala Taukiʻonetuku	Fatafehi Toutaitokotaha
Lavinia Veiongo	George Tupou II	ʻAnaseini Takipō
Viliami Tungī Mailefihi	Sālote Tupou III	Vīlai Tupou (illegitimate son)	Tupou Seini
Tāufaʻāhau Tupou IV	Halaevalu Mataʻaho ʻAhomeʻe	Siaosi 'Alipate Tupou, Baron Vaea	Tuputupu Ma'afu-'o-Tukuialahi
George Tupou V	Tupou VI	Nanasipauʻu Tukuʻaho
ʻIlima Lei Fifita Tohi (illegitimate daughter)	Tupoutoʻa ʻUlukalala	Sinaitakala Fakafanua
Taufaʻahau Manumataongo

- Fox, James J.; Sather, Clifford (1996). Origins, Ancestry and Alliance: Explorations in Austronesian Ethnography. Canberra: Department of Anthropology, Australian National University. p. 252. ISBN 978-0-7315-2432-7. OCLC 245762652.
- Kaeppler, Adrienne Lois; D.C. (2008). The Pacific Arts of Polynesia and Micronesia. Oxford: Oxford University Press. p. 90. ISBN 978-0-19-284238-1. OCLC 236158882.
- Völkel, Svenja (2010). Social Structure, Space and Possession in Tongan Culture and Language: An Ethnolinguistic Study. Amsterdam; Philadelphia: John Benjamins Publishing. p. 45. ISBN 978-90-272-0283-3.
- Wood-Ellem, Elizabeth (1999). Queen Sālote of Tonga: The Story of an Era 1900-1965. Auckland, N.Z: Auckland University Press. p. front. ISBN 978-0-8248-2529-4. OCLC 262293605.

Viliami Tungī Mailefihi House of Tupou Born: 1 November 1887 Died: 20 July 1941
Preceded by ʻAnaseini Takipō as queen consort	Prince consort of Tonga; 1918–1941	Vacant Title next held by Halaevalu Mataʻaho ʻAhomeʻe as queen consort
Political offices
Preceded by Tevita Tuʻivakano	Prime Minister of Tonga; 1923–1941	Succeeded by Solomone Ula Ata
