= Halaevalu Mataʻaho ʻAhomeʻe =

Queen of Tonga from 1965 to 2006

- Halaevalu in her youth

Queen consort of Tonga
- Tenure: 16 December 1965 – 10 September 2006
- Coronation: 4 July 1967
- Born: 29 May 1926; Kingdom of Tonga
- Died: 19 February 2017 (aged 90); Auckland, New Zealand
- Burial: 1 March 2017; Malaʻekula
- Spouse: Tāufaʻāhau Tupou IV (m. 1947; died 2006)
- Issue: George Tupou V; Salote, Princess Royal; Prince Fatafehi 'Alaivahamama'o Tuku'aho; Aho'eitu Tupou VI
Names
- Halaevalu Mataʻaho ʻAhomeʻe
- Father: Tēvita Manuopangai ʻAhomeʻe
- Mother: Heuʻifanga Veikune

Halaevalu Mataʻaho ʻAhomeʻe (29 May 1926 – 19 February 2017) was Queen of Tonga from 1965 to 2006, as the wife of King Tāufaʻāhau Tupou IV. She was the mother of kings George Tupou V and Tupou VI.

== Early life and education ==
Halaevalu Mataʻaho ʻAhomeʻe was born on 29 May 1926, the eldest daughter of the Hon. Tevita Manu-’o-pangai, ‘Ahome’e, sometime Governor of Vava’u and Ha’apai and Minister for Police and his wife, Heuʻifanga Veikune, a great-granddaughter of the Tu'i Tonga. She was also a great-great-granddaughter of Enele Maʻafu.

She was educated at St Joseph's Convent School, Nuku’alofa, and St Mary's College, in Auckland, New Zealand.

== Marriage ==
On 10 June 1947, Halaevalu married her distant relative Crown Prince Tāufaʻāhau of Tonga (eldest son of Queen Sālote Tupou III of Tonga (1900–1965) and Prince Viliami Tungī Mailefihi).

== Queen Mother ==
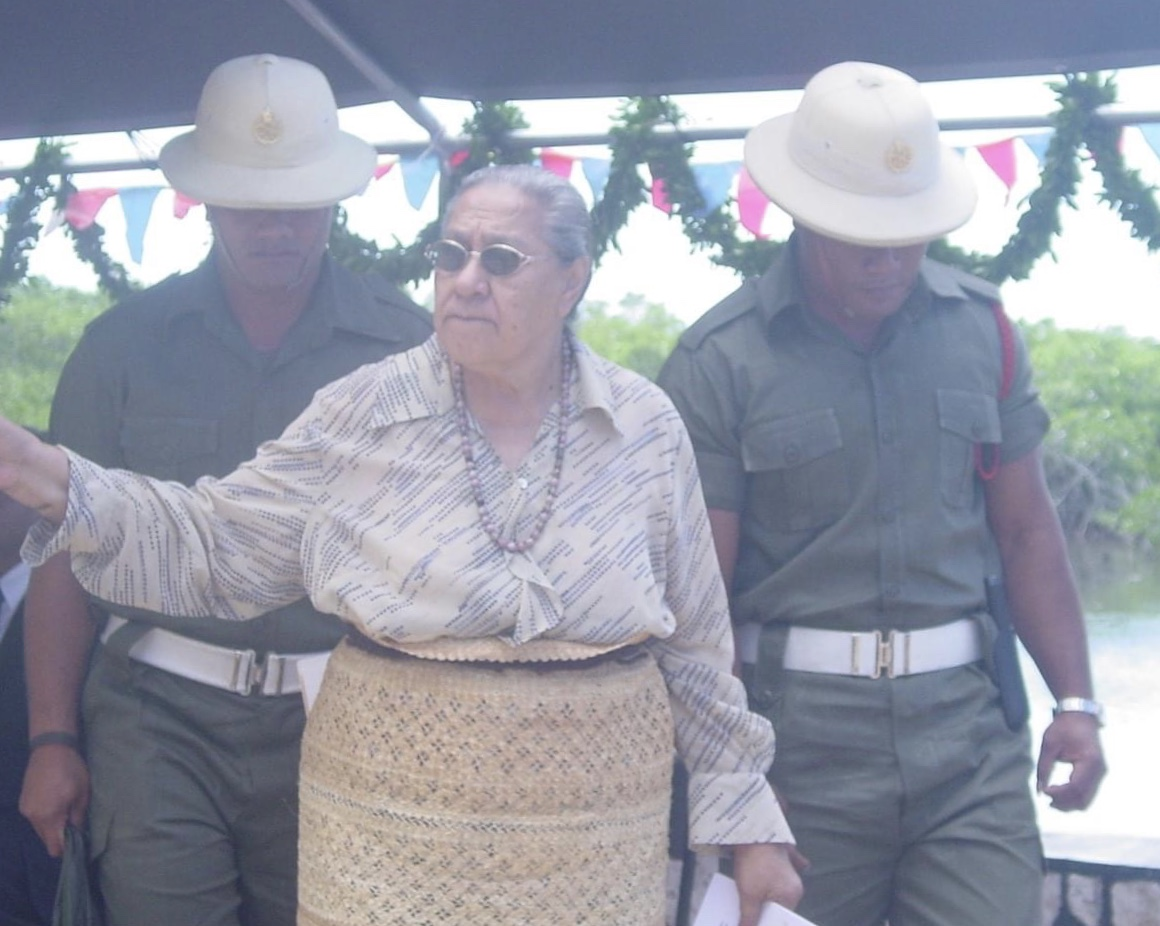
Queen Halaevalu flanked by officers, 2003

As Queen Mother, Halaevalu celebrated her 85th birthday in 2011 with a five-day celebration held in May. The celebrations began with a garden party for more than one hundred Tongan women held at the home of the President of the Free Wesleyan Church of Tonga, Rev. Dr. ‘Ahio. The Queen Mother attended a Roman Catholic mass at St. Mary's Cathedral in Ma'ufanga with King Siaosi Tupou V on 26 May 2011. The Tongan Ministry of Education, Women Affairs and Culture held a student celebration for her birthday on 27 May, with primary school students from Pangai Lahi to Teufaiva Park, presenting the Queen Mother with birthday gifts. A private party was held in Ha'avakatolo the next day, followed by a church service held at the Centennial Church on Sunday 29 May, and a luncheon at the Royal Palace in Nukuʻalofa.

The Queen Mother embarked on a two-week trip to the U.S. state of Utah in July and August 2011. Specifically, she came to visit the Tongan United Methodist Church in West Valley City, Utah, whose congregation had raised approximately $500,000 in less than a year to pay off the mortgage on the building. The Mayor of West Valley City, Michael K. Winder, awarded her the key to the city on 27 July 2011. She also met with Utah Governor Gary Herbert the next day.

== Death ==
Halaevalu died aged 90 on 19 February 2017 in Auckland, New Zealand, a week after leaving Tonga. Her granddaughter Princess Lātūfuipeka Tukuʻaho, High Commissioner of Tonga to Australia, was reportedly by her bedside when she died. Her remains were flown back to Tonga on 28 February, after lying-in-state at the Tongan royal residence, ʻAtalanga in Epsom, Auckland. The date of her funeral on 1 March was declared a public holiday by the Tongan government, which also observed ten days of mourning.

== Honours ==
=== National ===
- Tonga: Knight Grand Cross with Collar of the Order of Pouono
- Tonga: Knight Grand Cross with Collar of the Order of the Crown
- Tonga: Knight Grand Cross of the Order Order of Sālote Tupou III
- Tonga: Dame of the King George Tupou V Royal Family Order
- Tonga: Recipient of the Red Cross Medal
- Tonga: Recipient of the King Tupou VI Coronation Medal
- Tonga: Recipient of the King George Tupou V Coronation Medal
- Tonga: Recipient of the King Tāufaʻāhau Tupou IV Silver Jubilee Medal

=== Foreign ===
- Germany: Grand Cross of the Order of Merit of the Federal Republic of Germany, Special Class
- Japan: Paulownia Dame Grand Cordon of the Order of the Precious Crown
- Taiwan: Grand Cross of the Order of Propitious Clouds
- United Kingdom: Recipient of the Queen Elizabeth II Coronation Medal
- United Kingdom: Recipient of the Queen Elizabeth II Silver Jubilee Medal

== Ancestry ==
Ancestors of Halaevalu Mataʻaho ʻAhomeʻe

16. Tupou Tevita ʻAhomeʻe
8. Taniela ʻOtukolo ʻAhomeʻe
17. Lavinia Longoaʻameʻe
4. Solomone Piutau ʻOtukolo ʻAhomeʻe
18. ʻAisea Vau Mataele
9. Siulolovau Vaea
19. ʻIlaisipa Tuʻionetoa
2. Tēvita Manuopangai ʻAhomeʻe
20. Sūnia Mafileʻo
10. Viliami Maealiuaki Mafileʻo
21. Losaline Mafikaunanga
5. ʻAmelia Moʻungaʻaelangi Maealiuaki
22. George Alexander Blake
11. Maʻata Peleki (Martha Blake)
23. Matelita Fusilangoia Tangulu
1. Halaevalu Mataʻaho ʻAhomeʻe
24. ʻOsaiasi Tonga Veikune
12. Siosāteki Tonga Veikune
25. Temaleti Manakovi
6. Fotu ʻa Falefā Veikune
26. Taumoepeau
13. ʻAkanesi Tuʻifua
27. Tupoutuʻa Laumanukilupe
3. Heuʻifanga Veikune
28. ʻEnele Maʻafu
14. Siale ʻAtaongo
29. ʻElenoa Ngataialupe Lutui
7. Vāhoi ʻAtaongo
30. ʻIsileli Tupou
15. Tupou Moheofo
31. Lavinia Veiongo Mahanga

=== Family tree ===
Tupou family tree

Tuʻi Haʻatakalaua line	Tuʻi Tonga line	Tuʻi Kanokupolu line
Kalolaine Fusimatalili	George Tupou I	Fīnau Kaunanga
Fifita Vavʻau	Tēvita ʻUnga	Sālote Mafile‘o Pilolevu	Filiaipulotu
Fusipala Taukiʻonetuku	Fatafehi Toutaitokotaha
Lavinia Veiongo	George Tupou II	ʻAnaseini Takipō
Viliami Tungī Mailefihi	Sālote Tupou III	Vīlai Tupou (illegitimate son)	Tupou Seini
Tāufaʻāhau Tupou IV	Halaevalu Mataʻaho ʻAhomeʻe	Siaosi 'Alipate Tupou, Baron Vaea	Tuputupu Ma'afu-'o-Tukuialahi
George Tupou V	Tupou VI	Nanasipauʻu Tukuʻaho
ʻIlima Lei Fifita Tohi (illegitimate daughter)	Tupoutoʻa ʻUlukalala	Sinaitakala Fakafanua
Taufaʻahau Manumataongo

- Fox, James J.; Sather, Clifford (1996). Origins, Ancestry and Alliance: Explorations in Austronesian Ethnography. Canberra: Department of Anthropology, Australian National University. p. 252. ISBN 978-0-7315-2432-7. OCLC 245762652.
- Kaeppler, Adrienne Lois; D.C. (2008). The Pacific Arts of Polynesia and Micronesia. Oxford: Oxford University Press. p. 90. ISBN 978-0-19-284238-1. OCLC 236158882.
- Völkel, Svenja (2010). Social Structure, Space and Possession in Tongan Culture and Language: An Ethnolinguistic Study. Amsterdam; Philadelphia: John Benjamins Publishing. p. 45. ISBN 978-90-272-0283-3.
- Wood-Ellem, Elizabeth (1999). Queen Sālote of Tonga: The Story of an Era 1900-1965. Auckland, N.Z: Auckland University Press. p. front. ISBN 978-0-8248-2529-4. OCLC 262293605.

Halaevalu Mataʻaho ʻAhomeʻe House of Tupou Born: 29 May 1926 Died: 19 February 2017
Vacant Title last held by Viliami Tungī Mailefihi as prince consort	Queen consort of Tonga; 1965 – 2006	Vacant Title next held by Nanasipauʻu Vaea
