= Vaea =

Vaea is a Polynesian surname and male given name, derived from that of Mount Vaea on Upolu island, Samoa.

== Surname ==
Notable people with this surname include:

- ʻAlipate Tuʻivanuavou Vaea (born 1957), Tongan politician and nobleman
- Baron Vaea (1921–2009), Tongan politician
- Baroness Tuputupu Vaea, Tongan noblewoman and royal
- Ita Vaea (born 1989), Tongan rugby union player
- Mathew Vaea (born 1966), Samoan rugby union player

== Given name ==
Notable people with this given name include:

- Vaea Anitoni (born 1970), American rugby union footballer
- Vaea Falemaka (born 1985), Tongan rugby league player
- Vaea Fifita (born 1992), Tongan-born New Zealand rugby union player
