= Nanasipauʻu Tukuʻaho =

Queen of Tonga since 2012

Nanasipauʻu
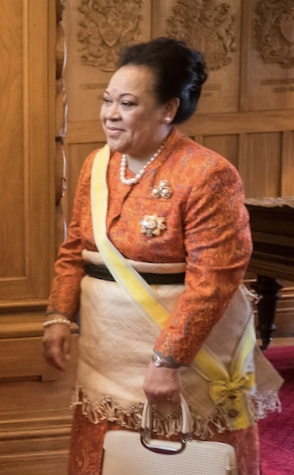
- Nanasipauʻu in 2019

Queen consort of Tonga
- Tenure: 18 March 2012 – present
- Coronation: 4 July 2015
- Born: Nanasipauʻu Vaea; 8 March 1954 (age 72); Nuku'alofa, Kingdom of Tonga
- Spouse: Tupou VI (m. 1982)
- Issue: Princess Latufuipeka; Tupoutoʻa ʻUlukalala; Prince Ata
Names
- Nanasipauʻu Vaea
- Father: Baron Vaea
- Mother: Baroness Tuputupu Vaea

Nanasipauʻu Tukuʻaho (née Nanasipauʻu Vaea; born 8 March 1954) is Queen of Tonga as the wife of King Tupou VI.

== Early life ==
Nanasipauʻu Vaea is the daughter of the late Baron Vaea, a former Prime Minister of Tonga from 1991 to 2000, and the late Baroness Tuputupu Vaea. She has six siblings:

- Dowager Lady Luseane Luani, born Luseane Vaea (widow of Sione Laumanuʻuli Luani).
- ʻAlipate Tuʻivanuavou, Lord Vaea, who married the sister of Lord Fakafānua, Siatukimoana Fakafānua Vaea, The Honourable Lady Vaea. She is the paternal aunt of Crown Princess Sinaitakala.
- Lady ʻAmelia Luoluafetuʻu, born ʻAmelia Luoluafetuʻu Vaea (former-wife of The Noble Lasike).
- Dame Cassandra Vaea, (formerly Cassandra Tuku'aho) former-wife of Prince Tuipelehake (formerly Viliami Sione Ngu Takeivulai Tuku'aho) son of Tu'ipelehake (Mailefihi) and his former wife Mele Vikatolia Faletau.
- Moimoikimofuta Kaifahina Vaea.
- Ratu Edward Palalaika 'a Tungi Vaea.

== Marriage and family ==
She was married at the Chapel Royal, at the Royal Palace, in Nukuʻalofa on 11 December 1982 to Tupou VI. The couple have three children and four grandchildren.

Their eldest child, Princess Lātūfuipeka Tukuʻaho (Angelika Lātūfuipeka Halaevalu Mataʻaho Napua-o-kalani Tukuʻaho), born on November 17, 1983, has been the High Commissioner to Australia since August 22, 2012.

Their second child, Crown Prince Tupoutoʻa ʻUlukalala (Siaosi Manumataongo ʻAlaivahamamaʻo ʻAhoʻeitu Konstantin Tukuʻaho), born on September 17, 1985, married his second cousin, Sinaitakala Fakafanua, on July 12, 2012. They have four children: Prince Taufaʻahau Manumataongo (born May 10, 2013), Princess Halaevalu Mataʻaho (born July 12, 2015), Princess Nanasipauʻu (born March 20, 2018), and Princess Salote Mafile’o Pilolevu (born February 25, 2021).

Their third child is Prince Ata (Viliami ʻUnuaki-ʻo-Tonga Mumui Lalaka-Mo-e-ʻEiki Tukuʻaho), born on April 27, 1988.

== Notable published works ==
- Kaeppler, A.L.; Taumoefolau, M.; Tukuʻaho, N., & Wood-Ellem, E. (2004): Songs and poems of Queen Salote. ISBN 978-982-213-008-9

== Honours ==
=== Orders ===
- Tonga:
  - Member of the King George Tupou V Royal Family Order (1 August 2011)
  - Dame Grand Cross of the Order of Salote Tupou III (30 June 2015)
  - Dame Grand Cross, Special Class of the Most Devoted Order of the Royal Household

=== Medals ===
- Tonga:
  - Recipient of the King Taufa’ahau Tupou IV Coronation Silver Jubilee Medal (4 July 1992)
  - Recipient of the King George Tupou V Coronation Medal (1 August 2008)
  - Recipient of the King George Tupou VI Coronation Medal (4 July 2015)

== Family tree ==
Tupou family tree

Tuʻi Haʻatakalaua line	Tuʻi Tonga line	Tuʻi Kanokupolu line
Kalolaine Fusimatalili	George Tupou I	Fīnau Kaunanga
Fifita Vavʻau	Tēvita ʻUnga	Sālote Mafile‘o Pilolevu	Filiaipulotu
Fusipala Taukiʻonetuku	Fatafehi Toutaitokotaha
Lavinia Veiongo	George Tupou II	ʻAnaseini Takipō
Viliami Tungī Mailefihi	Sālote Tupou III	Vīlai Tupou (illegitimate son)	Tupou Seini
Tāufaʻāhau Tupou IV	Halaevalu Mataʻaho ʻAhomeʻe	Siaosi 'Alipate Tupou, Baron Vaea	Tuputupu Ma'afu-'o-Tukuialahi
George Tupou V	Tupou VI	Nanasipauʻu Tukuʻaho
ʻIlima Lei Fifita Tohi (illegitimate daughter)	Tupoutoʻa ʻUlukalala	Sinaitakala Fakafanua
Taufaʻahau Manumataongo

- Fox, James J.; Sather, Clifford (1996). Origins, Ancestry and Alliance: Explorations in Austronesian Ethnography. Canberra: Department of Anthropology, Australian National University. p. 252. ISBN 978-0-7315-2432-7. OCLC 245762652.
- Kaeppler, Adrienne Lois; D.C. (2008). The Pacific Arts of Polynesia and Micronesia. Oxford: Oxford University Press. p. 90. ISBN 978-0-19-284238-1. OCLC 236158882.
- Völkel, Svenja (2010). Social Structure, Space and Possession in Tongan Culture and Language: An Ethnolinguistic Study. Amsterdam; Philadelphia: John Benjamins Publishing. p. 45. ISBN 978-90-272-0283-3.
- Wood-Ellem, Elizabeth (1999). Queen Sālote of Tonga: The Story of an Era 1900-1965. Auckland, N.Z: Auckland University Press. p. front. ISBN 978-0-8248-2529-4. OCLC 262293605.

Vacant Title last held by Halaevalu Mataʻaho ʻAhomeʻe	Queen consort of Tonga; 2012–Present	Incumbent
