= George Tupou =

George Tupou can refer to:

- George Tupou I (1797–1893), king of Tonga
- George Tupou II (1874–1918), king of Tonga
- George Tupou V (1948–2012), king of Tonga

== See also ==
- List of monarchs of Tonga
