= ʻAnaseini Takipō =

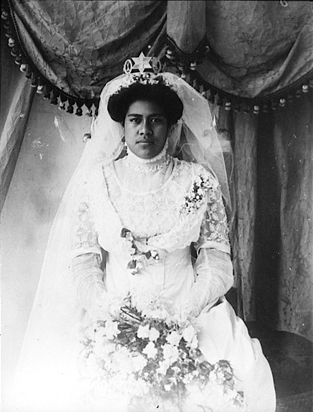
- Queen Takipō on her wedding day

Queen consort of Tonga
- Tenure: 11 November 1909 – 5 April 1918
- Born: 1 March 1893; Nukuʻalofa, Tonga
- Died: 26 November 1918 (aged 25); Finefekai, Nukuʻalofa, Tonga
- Burial: Malaʻeʻaloa
- Spouse: George Tupou II (m. 1909; died 1918)
- Issue: ʻElisiva Fusipala Taukiʻonelua ʻElisiva Fusipala Taukiʻonetuku
Names
- ʻAnaseini Takipō Afuhaʻamango
- House: House of Tupou
- Father: Tēvita Ula Afuhaʻamango
- Mother: Siosiana Tongovua Tae Manusā

ʻAnaseini Takipō Afuhaʻamango (1 March 1893 – 26 November 1918) was Queen of Tonga from 1909 to 1918 as the second wife of George Tupou II. Her name was also often rendered as Ana Seini Takipo.

== Life ==
ʻAnaseini Takipō Afuhaʻamango was born on 1 March 1893 in Nukuʻalofa. Her father was Tēvita Ula Afuhaʻamango, Noble of Vavaʻu, and her mother was Siosiana Tongovua Tae Manusā. From her maternal relation, she was a descendant of the Tuʻi Kanokupolu line. King George Tupou II had rejected her half-sister ʻOfakivavaʻu in 1899 to marry Lavinia Veiongo, a choice that damaged the royal family's relation with the rest of the country and nearly caused a civil war between factions loyal to the family of ʻOfa and the family of Lavinia. Both women died in 1901 and 1902 respectively and the grief-strickened king remained unmarried with only one legitimate daughter Princess Sālote Mafile‘o Pilolevu, who was an unpopular heir with the former supporters of the deceased ʻOfa.

In order to appease his subjects and the Council of Chiefs, King Tupou II married ʻAnaseini Takipō, the sister of the rejected ʻOfa, on 11 November 1909. She was sixteen years old at the time of the marriage. It was expected that the King would be able to produce a male heir to succeed him to the throne. Queen Lavinia's daughter Princess Sālote was sent to school in Auckland, New Zealand, as a form of exile.

Queen Takipō gave birth to two daughters: ʻElisiva Fusipala Taukiʻonelua (1911–1911, known as Princess ʻOnelua) and ʻElisiva Fusipala Taukiʻonetuku (1912–1933, known as Princess Fusipala). Princess ʻOnelua died of convulsion in her infancy and Princess Fusipala died in Australia unmarried.

Her husband died on 5 April 1918 and was succeeded by his eldest daughter, who became Queen Sālote Tupou III, the first queen regnant of Tonga. Shortly after, Queen Dowager Takipō died at Finefekai, Nukuʻalofa, on 26 November 1918, both Siaosi and Takipo died as a result of the infamous 1918 flu pandemic which killed eight percent of the population of Tonga. After Takipō's death, Sālote assumed the guardianship of her half-sister Princess Fusipala. She was buried at Malaʻeʻaloa, the chiefly burial ground in Kolomotuʻa, instead of Malaʻekula where her husband and daughters were buried.

== Family tree ==
Tupou family tree

Tuʻi Haʻatakalaua line	Tuʻi Tonga line	Tuʻi Kanokupolu line
Kalolaine Fusimatalili	George Tupou I	Fīnau Kaunanga
Fifita Vavʻau	Tēvita ʻUnga	Sālote Mafile‘o Pilolevu	Filiaipulotu
Fusipala Taukiʻonetuku	Fatafehi Toutaitokotaha
Lavinia Veiongo	George Tupou II	ʻAnaseini Takipō
Viliami Tungī Mailefihi	Sālote Tupou III	Vīlai Tupou (illegitimate son)	Tupou Seini
Tāufaʻāhau Tupou IV	Halaevalu Mataʻaho ʻAhomeʻe	Siaosi 'Alipate Tupou, Baron Vaea	Tuputupu Ma'afu-'o-Tukuialahi
George Tupou V	Tupou VI	Nanasipauʻu Tukuʻaho
ʻIlima Lei Fifita Tohi (illegitimate daughter)	Tupoutoʻa ʻUlukalala	Sinaitakala Fakafanua
Taufaʻahau Manumataongo

- Fox, James J.; Sather, Clifford (1996). Origins, Ancestry and Alliance: Explorations in Austronesian Ethnography. Canberra: Department of Anthropology, Australian National University. p. 252. ISBN 978-0-7315-2432-7. OCLC 245762652.
- Kaeppler, Adrienne Lois; D.C. (2008). The Pacific Arts of Polynesia and Micronesia. Oxford: Oxford University Press. p. 90. ISBN 978-0-19-284238-1. OCLC 236158882.
- Völkel, Svenja (2010). Social Structure, Space and Possession in Tongan Culture and Language: An Ethnolinguistic Study. Amsterdam; Philadelphia: John Benjamins Publishing. p. 45. ISBN 978-90-272-0283-3.
- Wood-Ellem, Elizabeth (1999). Queen Sālote of Tonga: The Story of an Era 1900-1965. Auckland, N.Z: Auckland University Press. p. front. ISBN 978-0-8248-2529-4. OCLC 262293605.

== Bibliography ==
- Eustis, Nelson (1997). The King of Tonga: A Biography. Adelaide: Hobby Investment. ISBN 978-0-646-33077-8. OCLC 38837175.
- Kaeppler, Adrienne L. (June 2000). "Reviewed Work: Queen Sālote of Tonga: The Story of an Era 1900–1965 by Elizabeth Wood-Ellem". The Journal of the Polynesian Society. 109 (2). The Polynesian Society: 213–215. JSTOR 20706924.
- Wood-Ellem, Elizabeth (1999). Queen Sālote of Tonga: The Story of an Era 1900–1965. Auckland, N.Z: Auckland University Press. ISBN 978-0-8248-2529-4. OCLC 262293605.
- Wood-Ellem, Elizabeth (2007). Tonga and the Tongans: Heritage and Identity. Alphington, Victoria: Tonga Research Association. ISBN 978-0-646-47466-3. OCLC 174101821.

Preceded by Lavinia Veiongo	Queen consort of Tonga; 1909–1918	Succeeded by Viliami Tungī Mailefihi as prince consort
