= List of royal consorts of Tonga =

Royal Consort of Tonga
- Coat of arms of Tonga

Incumbent
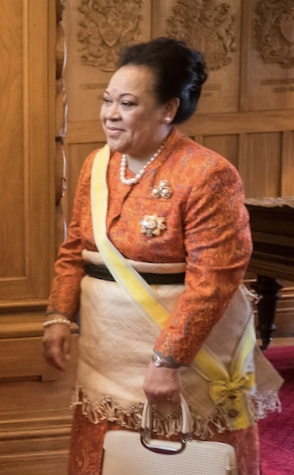
- Nanasipauʻu Tukuʻaho since 18 March 2012

Details
- Style: Her Majesty
- Formed: 4 December 1845
- Residences: Royal Palace, Nukuʻalofa

The Royal Consort of Tonga is the spouse of the reigning monarch of the Kingdom of Tonga. The position has existed since the unification of Tonga on 4 December 1845 under Siaosi Tupou I, the first king of the House of Tupou.

Six individuals have held the position of royal consort since 1845. The current royal consort is Nanasipauʻu Tukuʻaho, who has served in the role since 18 March 2012 following the accession of Tupou VI. The royal consort resides at the Royal Palace in Nukuʻalofa.

== Royal consort of Tonga ==
=== House of Tupou ===
No.	Picture	Name	Birth	Marriage	Became Consort	Ceased to be Consort	Death	Spouse
1		Sālote Lupepauʻu	1811	1833 pagan rite 27 March 1834; Christian rite	4 December 1845 unification of Tonga; 4 November 1875 proclamation of the 1st Tongan constitution	8 September 1889		Siaosi Tupou I (Prior to her marriage with King Siaosi Tupou I, Queen Sālote Lupepau'u was a consort in the harem of the last Tu'i Tonga, Sanualio Fatafehi Laufilitonga).
2		Lavinia Veiongo	9 February 1879	1 June 1899		24 April 1902		Siaosi Tupou II
3		ʻAnaseini Takipō	1 March 1893	11 November 1909		5 April 1918 husband's death	26 November 1918	Siaosi Tupou II
4		Viliami Tungī Mailefihi	1/8 November 1887	19 September 1917 pagan rite 21 September 1917; Christian rite	5 April 1918 wife's ascension	20 July 1941		Sālote Tupou III
5		Halaevalu Mataʻaho ʻAhomeʻe	29 May 1926	10 June 1947	6 December 1965 husband's ascension	10 September 2006 husband's death	19 February 2017	Tāufaʻāhau Tupou IV
6		Nanasipauʻu Tukuʻaho	8 March 1954	11 December 1982	18 March 2012 husband's ascension	Incumbent	Living	Tupou VI
