= George Tupou I =

King of Tonga from 1845 to 1893

Siaosi Tupou I
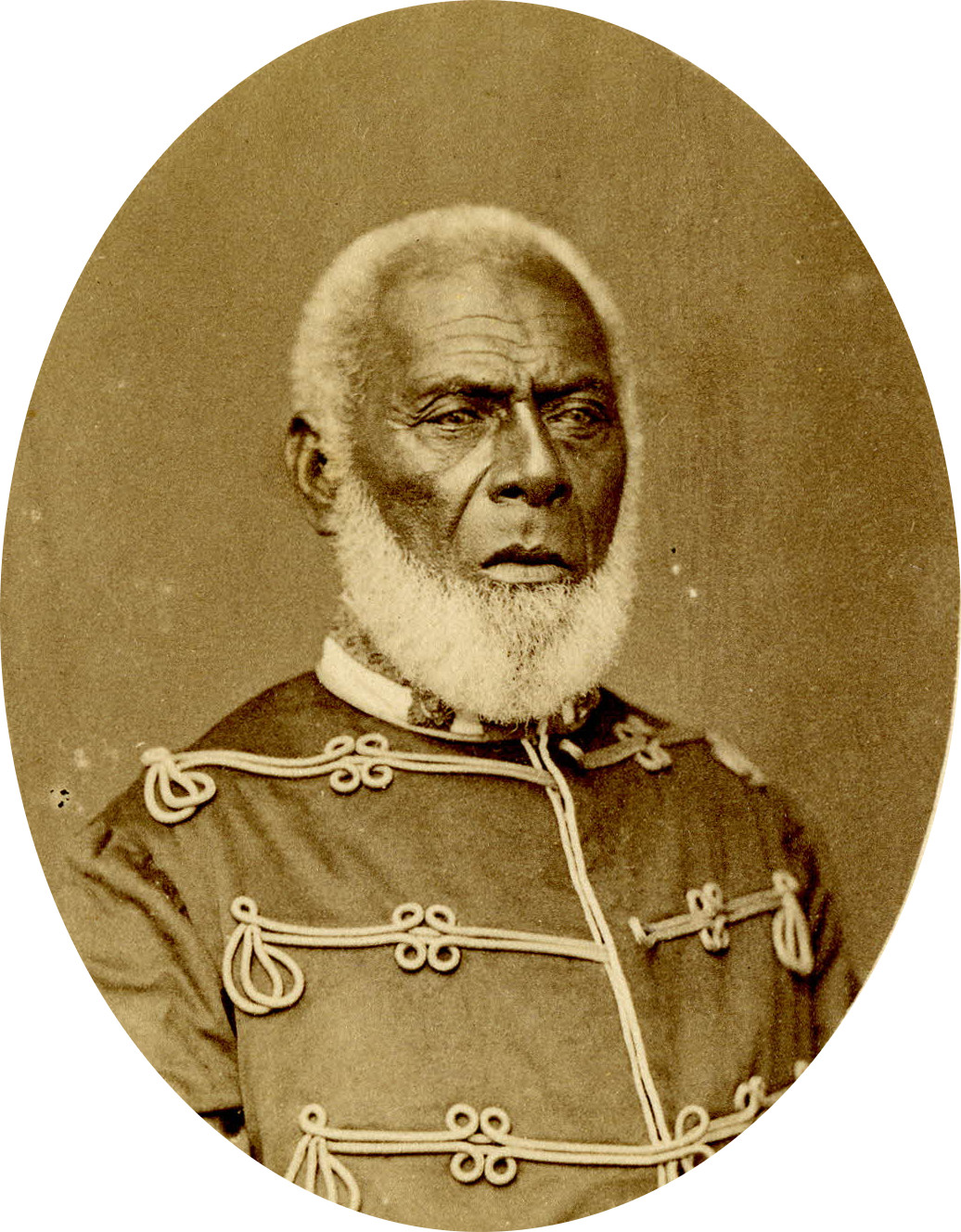
- George Tupou I, c. 1880s

King of Tonga
- Reign: 4 December 1845 – 18 February 1893
- Coronation: 4 November 1875
- Predecessor: Laufilitonga (as Emperor)
- Successor: Siaosi Tupou II
- Prime Ministers: Tēvita ʻUnga; Shirley Waldemar Baker
- Born: Tāufaʻāhau; 4 December 1797
- Died: 18 February 1893 (aged 95); Nukuʻalofa, Tonga, Polynesia
- Burial: Malaʻe Kula
- Spouse: Sālote Lupepauʻu
- Issue: Tēvita ʻUnga; Sālote Mafileʻo Pilolevu; Tuʻukitau; Vuna Takitakimālohi
- House: Tupou
- Father: Tupoutoʻa
- Mother: Hoamofaleono
- Religion: Tongan religion (former); Free Church of Tonga

George Tupou I (4 December 1797 – 18 February 1893), originally known as Tāufaʻāhau I, was the first king of modern Tonga. Originally controlling a disputed piece of land in Haʻapai, he expanded to control Vavaʻu, Tongatapu, and other islands.

== Early life ==
George Tupou I was born on 4 December 1797, to Tupouto'a and Hoamofaleono.

== Reign ==
=== Conquests ===
A series of civil wars in the 18th century had fractured Tonga. Tupou received a disputed inheritance of land in Haʻapai in 1820.

Tupou gained control over Vavaʻu in 1833, and assumed nominal control over Tongatapu after gaining the title of Tu'i Kanokupolu in 1845.

Ngongo, the chief of Niuatoputapu, converted to Christianity and led a group of men to Uvea in 1835. Ngongo and his men were massacred. The king of Uvea offered to send tribute and requested forgiveness from Tupou.

Laufilitonga was a rival of Tupou. The title of Tuʻi Tonga, which Laufilitonga gained in 1827, was acquired by Tupou after Laufilitonga's death in 1865.

=== Fiji ===
Tupou first visited Fiji in 1842, while returning to Tonga from Samoa. Tupou met Seru Epenisa Cakobau in 1853, and appointed Enele Maʻafu and Lualala to administer the Tongans in Fiji. Ma'afu conquered Vanua Balavu in 1854, and Tupou defeated Cakobau's enemies at the Battle of Kaba in 1855. Ma'afu was involved in the 1857 Macuata War and boasted to William Thomas Pritchard in 1859 that he could conquer Fiji. Pritchard forced Ma'afu to renounce his territorial claims in 1859.

Tupou's heir Vuna died in January 1862. Ma'afu, believing that he could become the new heir, took the majority of Tonga's warriors from Fiji back to Tonga. Tupou planned an invasion of Fiji in 1862, but Pritchard convinced Tupou to abandon these plans in April.

During Ma'afu's absence a group of Tongans under the command of Wainiqolo were involved in a skirmish. An inquiry was conducted by Ma'afu and he asked for reinforcements from Tupou. European settlers in Fiji requested a war ship for their protection. Pritchard and I.M. Brower wrote to Tupou to warn him that sending his army to Fiji could incur an international response. 1,000 Tongan men were already sent before the letter arrived, but Tupou cancelled the expedition.

A confederacy was formed in Fiji in 1867, and the northern and eastern portions of Fiji were controlled by Maʻafu. However, he considered himself an agent of Tonga and still used the Tongan flag. The parliament of Tonga agreed to end its claims to Fiji in 1869, and Maʻafu became a Fijian chief.

=== Governance ===
Charles St Julian provided advice to Tupou on constitutional development, but Tupou dismissed his ideas and instead sought advice from officials in New Zealand. St Julian criticised Tupou in an article published by The Sydney Morning Herald in which he claimed that Tupou sought to conquer Samoa and Fiji.

In 1852, Tupou combined the positions of sacred king, Tu'i Tonga, and secular chief and became head of the Free Church of Tonga. Reverend Shirley Waldemar Baker was selected to administer this church.

An assembly of chiefs was called by Tupou for the first time in 1859. This group formed a law code that was issued in 1862.

James Egan Moulton was invited to Tonga by Tupou in 1865, and asked to establish Tupou College.

In 1875, Tupou promulgated the Constitution of Tonga, which formally established Tonga as a constitutional monarchy.

=== Death ===
Tupou died in 1893 at the age of 95 and was buried in Malaʻekula. He was succeeded by his great-grandson George Tupou II.

=== Gallery ===
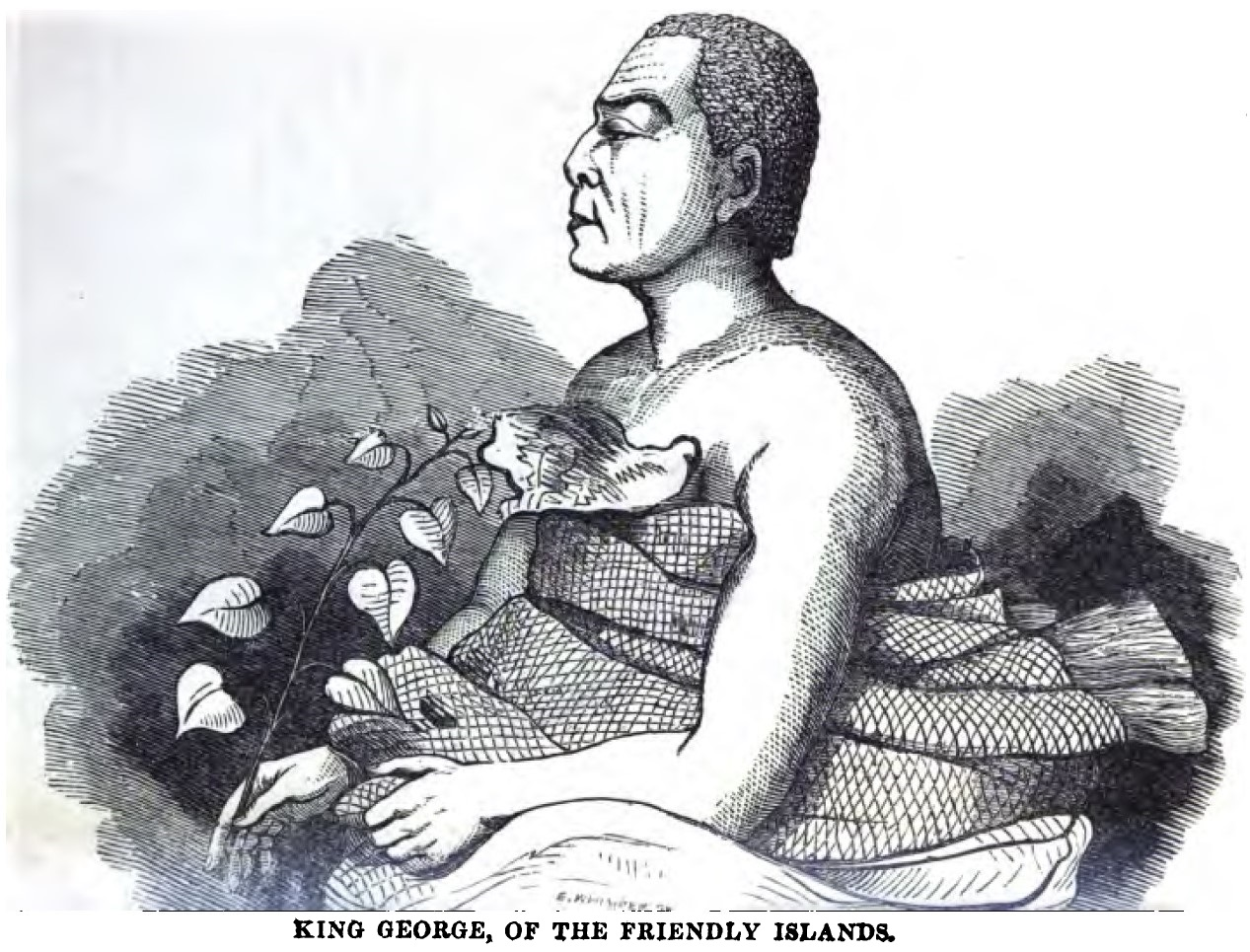
King George of the Friendly Islands (1852)

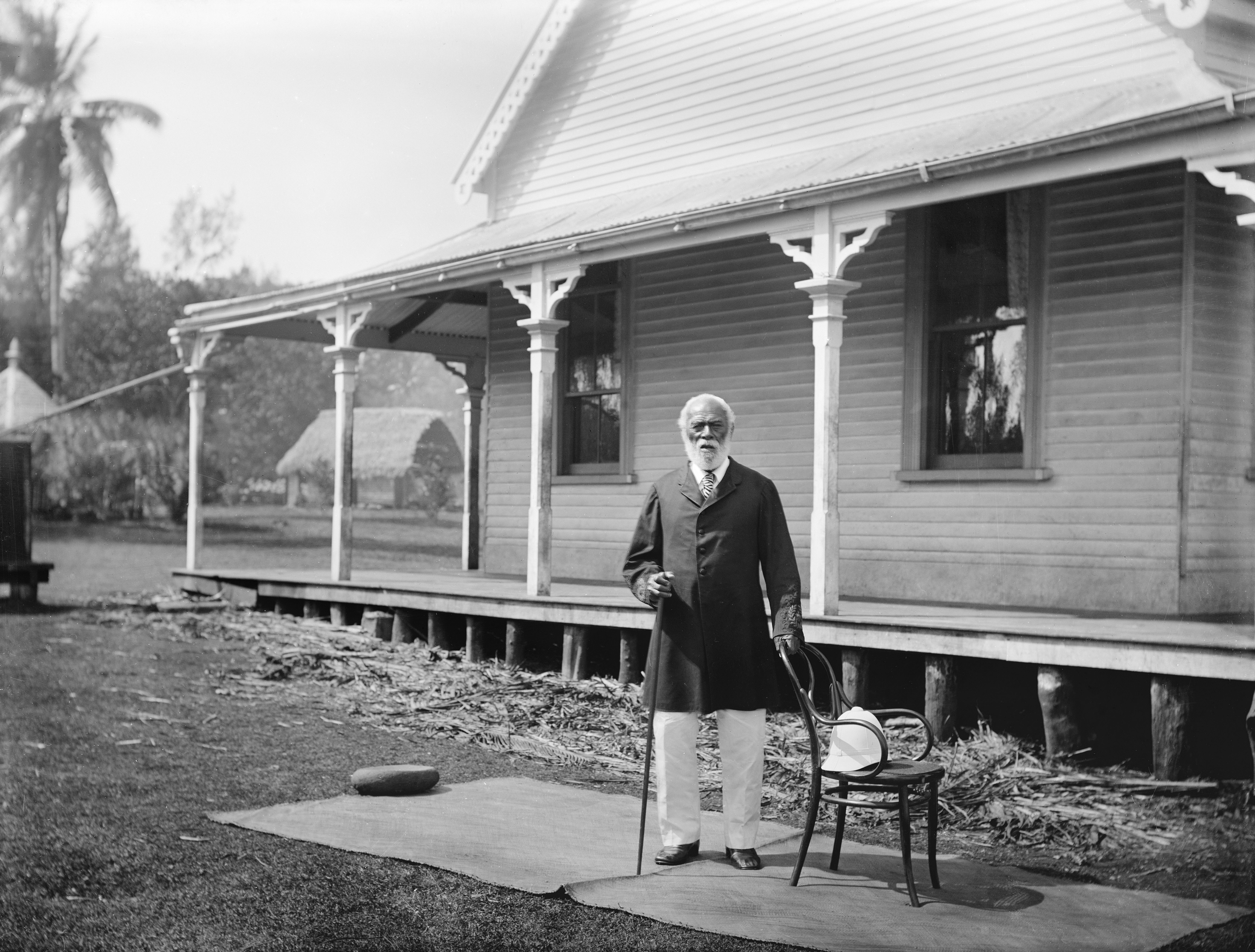
The King at the Palace at Neiafu, 1884

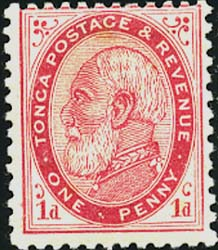
Tongan stamp, 1 penny, 1886

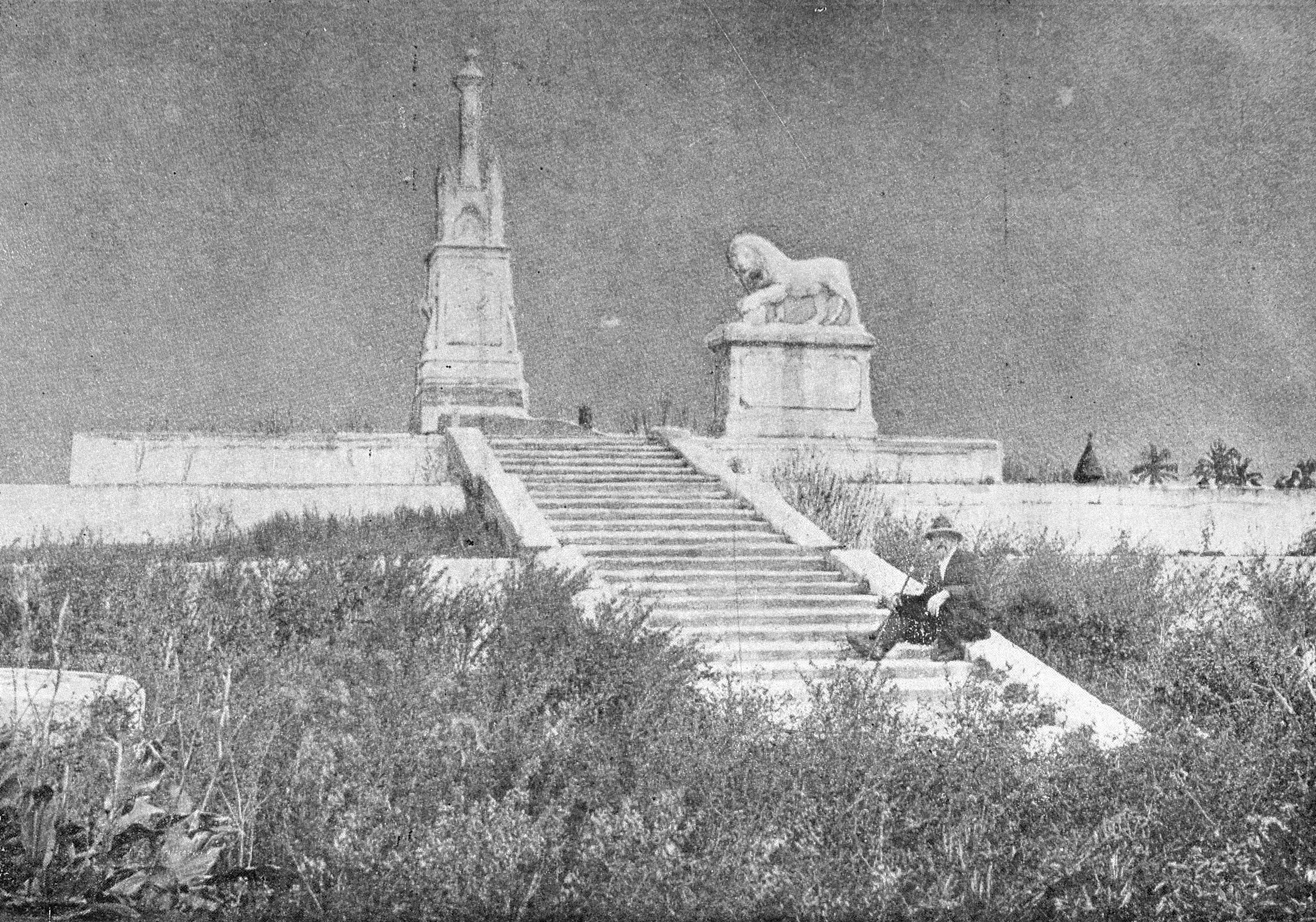
Tomb of King George Tupou I, 1900

== Family tree ==
Tupou family tree

Tuʻi Haʻatakalaua line	Tuʻi Tonga line	Tuʻi Kanokupolu line
Kalolaine Fusimatalili	George Tupou I	Fīnau Kaunanga
Fifita Vavʻau	Tēvita ʻUnga	Sālote Mafile‘o Pilolevu	Filiaipulotu
Fusipala Taukiʻonetuku	Fatafehi Toutaitokotaha
Lavinia Veiongo	George Tupou II	ʻAnaseini Takipō
Viliami Tungī Mailefihi	Sālote Tupou III	Vīlai Tupou (illegitimate son)	Tupou Seini
Tāufaʻāhau Tupou IV	Halaevalu Mataʻaho ʻAhomeʻe	Siaosi 'Alipate Tupou, Baron Vaea	Tuputupu Ma'afu-'o-Tukuialahi
George Tupou V	Tupou VI	Nanasipauʻu Tukuʻaho
ʻIlima Lei Fifita Tohi (illegitimate daughter)	Tupoutoʻa ʻUlukalala	Sinaitakala Fakafanua
Taufaʻahau Manumataongo

- Fox, James J.; Sather, Clifford (1996). Origins, Ancestry and Alliance: Explorations in Austronesian Ethnography. Canberra: Department of Anthropology, Australian National University. p. 252. ISBN 978-0-7315-2432-7. OCLC 245762652.
- Kaeppler, Adrienne Lois; D.C. (2008). The Pacific Arts of Polynesia and Micronesia. Oxford: Oxford University Press. p. 90. ISBN 978-0-19-284238-1. OCLC 236158882.
- Völkel, Svenja (2010). Social Structure, Space and Possession in Tongan Culture and Language: An Ethnolinguistic Study. Amsterdam; Philadelphia: John Benjamins Publishing. p. 45. ISBN 978-90-272-0283-3.
- Wood-Ellem, Elizabeth (1999). Queen Sālote of Tonga: The Story of an Era 1900-1965. Auckland, N.Z: Auckland University Press. p. front. ISBN 978-0-8248-2529-4. OCLC 262293605.

== Works cited ==
=== Journals ===
- Campbell, I. (1990). "The Alleged Imperialism of George Tupou I". The Journal of Pacific History. 25 (2). Taylor & Francis: 159–175. doi:10.2307/25169036. JSTOR 25169036.
- Campbell, I. (1982). "The Tu'i Ha'atakalaua and the Ancient Constitution of Tonga". The Journal of Pacific History. 17 (4). Taylor & Francis: 178–194. doi:10.2307/25168502. JSTOR 25168502.
- Daly, Martin (2008). "'Another Agency in This Great Work': The Beginnings of Missionary Printing in Tonga". The Journal of Pacific History. 43 (3). Taylor & Francis: 367–374. doi:10.2307/40346663. JSTOR 40346663.
- Trompf, Garry (2015). "New Religious Movements in Oceania". Nova Religio. 18 (4). University of Pennsylvania Press: 5–15. doi:10.1525/nr.2015.18.4.5. JSTOR nr.2015.18.4.5.
- Lawson, Stephanie, ed. (1996), "The Monarchy Versus Democracy in the Kingdom of Tonga", Tradition versus Democracy in the South Pacific: Fiji, Tonga and Western Samoa, Cambridge University Press, pp. 79–116, doi:10.1017/CBO9780511470165.006, ISBN 978-0-521-49638-4

=== Web ===
- "Royal/Nobility". Tonga. Archived from the original on 13 March 2013.

Regnal titles
First office created from the Tuʻi Kanokupolu and Tuʻi Tonga dynasties	King of Tonga; 1845–1893	Succeeded by George Tupou II
