= ʻAlipate Tuʻivanuavou Vaea =

Speaker of the Tongan Legislative Assembly since 2025

The Honourable Lord Vaea
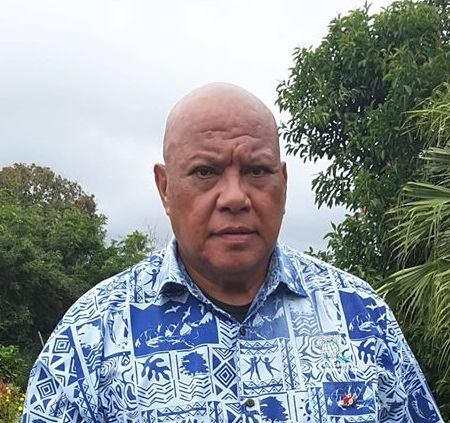
- Lord Vaea in 2020

Speaker of the Legislative Assembly
- Incumbent
- Assumed office 15 December 2025
- Prime Minister: ʻAisake Eke; Fatafehi Fakafānua
- Deputy: Havea Tuʻihaʻangana
- Preceded by: Fatafehi Fakafānua

Minister of Internal Affairs
- In office 1 September 2022 – 10 December 2024
- Prime Minister: Siaosi Sovaleni
- Preceded by: Sangster Saulala
- Succeeded by: Sinaitakala Tuʻitahi
Other offices held
Minister for Agriculture, Food, Forests and Fisheries
In office 4 January 2011 – 13 July 2012
Prime Minister	Lord Tuʻivakanō
Preceded by	Prince Tuʻipelehake Mailefihi
Succeeded by	Sangster Saulala
Minister for Training, Employment, Youth and Sports
In office 1 May 2012 – 30 December 2014
Prime Minister	Lord Tuʻivakanō
Preceded by	Sosefo Vakata
Succeeded by	Sosefo Vakata

Member of the Tongan Parliament for Tongatapu Noble's constituency
- Incumbent
- Assumed office 18 November 2021
- Preceded by: Lord Vahaʻi
- In office 25 November 2010 – 16 November 2017
- Succeeded by: Lord Vahaʻi

Personal details
- Born: ʻAlipate (Albert) Tuʻivanuavou Vaea; 19 September 1957 (age 68)
- Party: none (Nobles' Representative)
- Spouse: Lady Siatukimoana Fakafānua Vaea
- Parent(s): Baron Vaea; Baroness Tuputupu Vaea

ʻAlipate Tuʻivanuavou Vaea, Lord Vaea (born 19 September 1957) is a Tongan politician and a member of the Tongan nobility. He has served as Master of the Royal Household and "long-time palace archivist", as well as being Chairman of the Tonga Traditions Committee.

He was bestowed the title of 16th Lord Vaea and 2nd Baron Vaea of Houma upon the death of his father, ʻAlipate Halakilangi Tauʻalupeoko Vaea Tupou, the previous Vaea, on 7 June 2009. His mother is Baroness Tuputupu Vaea. Vaea is the brother of the present Queen of Tonga Nanasipauʻu Tukuʻaho and the brother-in-law (and second cousin) of King Tupou VI.

This enabled him to rank among the small number of nobles entitled to elect and be elected among, the Nobles' Representatives to Parliament. Thus he began his career in national politics when he was elected to Parliament as a Nobles' Representative for Tongatapu in the November 2010 general election. He was then appointed Minister for Agriculture, Food, Forests and Fisheries in the Cabinet of new Prime Minister Lord Tuʻivakanō. On 1 May 2012, he received, in addition, the Training, Employment, Youth and Sports portfolio.

Tuʻivanuavou was re-elected as a noble's representative in the 2014 Tongan general election, and became the unofficial leader of the opposition. In August 2016 Tuʻivanuavou repeatedly promised to bring a no confidence motion against Prime Minister ʻAkilisi Pōhiva, but ultimately failed to do so. A later attempt in early 2017 was defeated, 10 votes to 14.

He sought re-election at the 2017 Tongan general election, but tied the vote with Lord Vahaʻi and lost the subsequent coin-toss. He was re-elected at the 2021 election. On 1 September 2022 he was appointed Minister of Internal Affairs, replacing Sangster Saulala, whose election had been voided for bribery. Following the resignation of Sovaleni as Prime Minister in December 2024, he resigned from Cabinet. After the 2025 general election, on 15 December, Vaea was elected as speaker of the Legislative Assembly unopposed.

== Patronages ==
- Former Tonga Rugby Union Chairman.
- Former Pacific Islands Rugby Alliance Chairman.

== Ancestry ==
Ancestors of ʻAlipate Tuʻivanuavou Vaea

16. Siaosi Fatafehi Toutaitokotaha
8. George Tupou II
17. ʻElisiva Fusipala Taukiʻonetuku
4. Vīlai Tupou
18. ʻIsileli Tupou
9. Tupou Moheofo
19. Lavinia Veiongo Mahanga
2. Baron Vaea
20. Solome Kulikefu, 11th Noble Vaea
10. Siosaia Pauʻuvale Loloaʻatonga, 13th Noble Vaea
21. Finau Fekita
5. Hon. Tupouseini Manumatavai Vaea
22. Filipe Taufa Tongilava
11. Kalolaine Tongilava
23. Seluvaia Tupouʻuluiki
1. Lord Vaea
24. Finau Filimoeʻuli, 5th Noble Maʻafu
12. Siotame Fakatulolo, 6th Noble Maʻafu
25. ʻAne Nanasi Kioa
6. Siosaia Siotame Lausiʻi, 7th Noble Maʻafu
13. Teisa Vaka Sateki
3. Hon. Tuputupukipulotu Lausiʻi
28. Sunia ʻAkaveka Mafileʻo
14. Sione Lamipeti Mafileʻo
29. Fanetupou Vavaʻu
7. ʻAnaukihesina Lamipeti
30. Tevita Taʻofikaetau Tapueluelu
15. ʻAlilia Funakitoutai Tapueluelu
31. Siutiti ʻAfuhaʻapai Luani
