= Tupoutoʻa (Haʻapai) =

Ruler of Ha'apai, Tonga

Tupouto'a (died 1820) was the ruler of Haʻapai, Tonga from 1808 to 1820 and the father of the first king of Tonga, Tāufā'ahāu (George Tupou I).
