= George Tupou II =

King of Tonga from 1893 to 1918

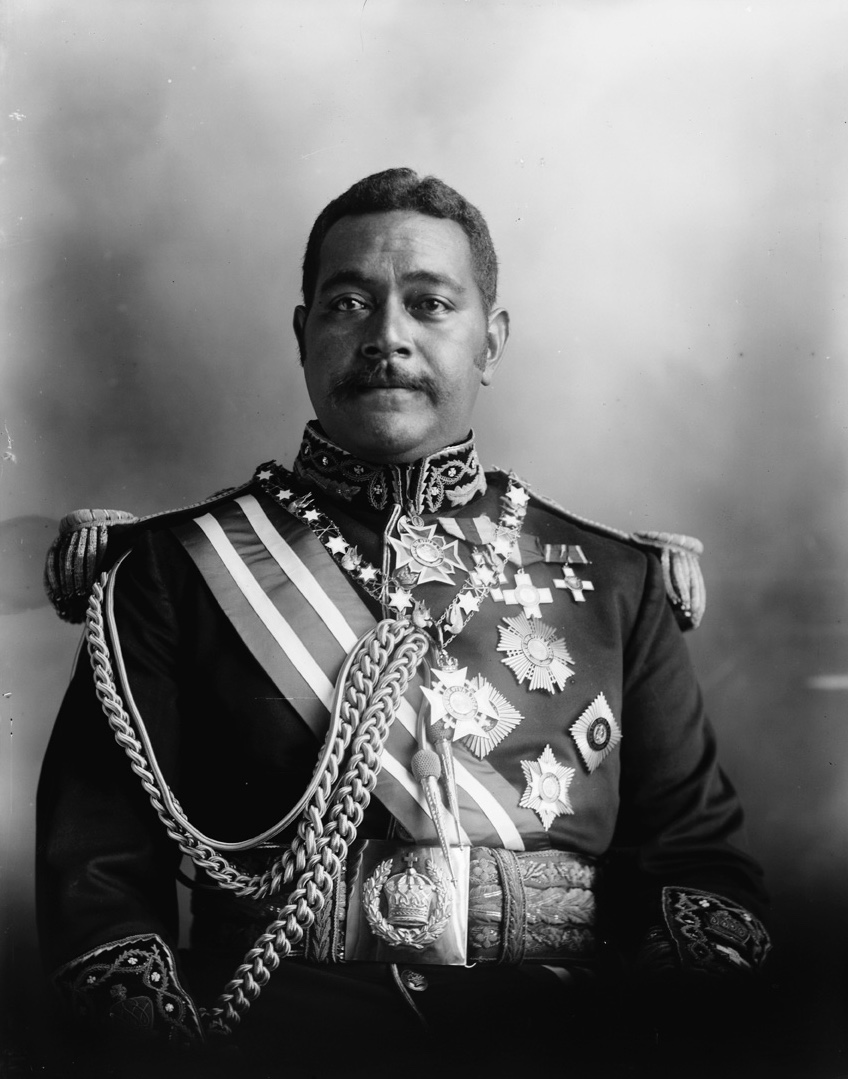
- Photograph by Herman John Schmidt

King of Tonga
- Reign: 18 February 1893 – 5 April 1918
- Coronation: 17 July 1893, Nukuʻalofa
- Predecessor: Siaosi Tupou I
- Successor: Sālote Tupou III
- Prime Ministers: Siosateki Veikune; Sione Mateialona Tevita Tuʻivakano (m. 1909)
- Born: 18 June 1874; Neiafu, Tonga
- Died: 5 April 1918 (aged 43); Tonga
- Burial: Malaʻekula
- Spouse: Lavinia Veiongo (m. 1899; died 1902) ʻAnaseini Takipō (m. 1909)
- Issue: Ana Fakalelu Kihe Fana, Uaia, Sālote Tupou III ʻElisiva Fusipala Taukiʻonelua 'Elisiva Fusipala Taukiʻonetuku (1912–1933) ʻElisiva Fusipala Taukiʻonetuku; Edward Cakobau (illegitimate); Vīlai Tupou (illegitimate)
- House: Tupou
- Father: Tuʻi Pelehake Fatafehi Toutaitokotaha
- Mother: ʻElisiva Fusipala Taukiʻonetuku
- Religion: Free Church of Tonga

George Tupou II (Tongan: Siaosi Tupou II; 18 June 1874 – 5 April 1918) was the King of Tonga from 18 February 1893 until his death. He was officially crowned at Nukuʻalofa, on 17 March 1893. He was also the 20th Tuʻi Kanokupolu.

== Life ==
Siaosi (George) Tupou II was related to his predecessor and founder of the united Tongan Kingdom, King George Tupou I, Tāufaʻāhau Tupou I on both sides of his family. His father was Prince Tuʻi Pelehake Fatafehi Toutaitokotaha, who was also Prime Minister of Tonga in 1905. Fatafehi's mother Sālote Pilolevu was a daughter of Tāufaʻāhau Tupou I. Siaosi Tupou II's mother was Fusipala Taukiʻonetuku, a daughter of Tēvita ʻUnga who was a son of Tāufaʻāhau Tupou I.

Tupou II's reign was troubled by government corruption and inefficiency. The Tongan Parliament in 1900 was suspicious of Tupou II's governing and audited his accounts several times, finding discrepancies worth thousands of pounds. The expatriate community in Tonga called for its annexation to New Zealand.

Before he was married to Lavinia Veiongo, he had an intimate relationship with Margaret Cocker, which resulted in two children, Uaia and Ana Fakalelu Kihe Fana. These two children were kept a secret due to the implications of the King having relations with a commoner from England. Uaia continued to live in the palace while his sister Ana was entrusted into the care of a chieftain of Uiha Malupo (Takapautolo). He had a close relationship with his daughter Sālote.

He shared his common love of writing songs and poems with his earlier Hawaiʻian colleague Kalakaua. He is also known for his support of constructing cement water tanks (vaisima) throughout Tonga to provide clean water to the people and improve public health.

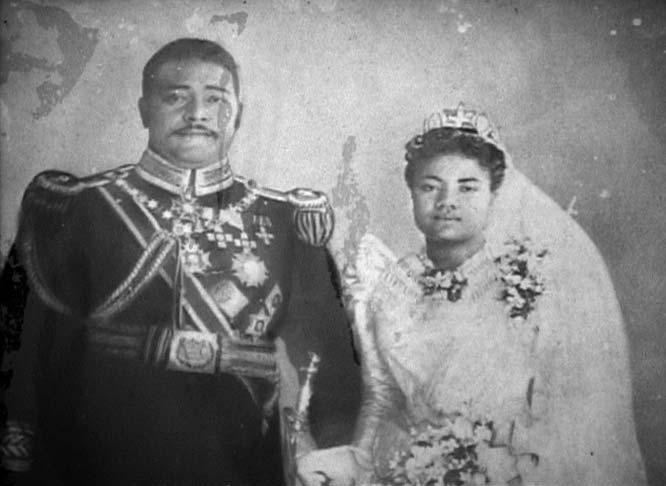
The marriage of Siaosi & Lavinia

He ascended the throne at the age of 18 upon the death of his great-grandfather George Tupou I in 1893, at which time he was still a bachelor. In 1896, the chiefs of the country urged him to marry and produce an heir. They suggested ʻOfa-ki-Vavaʻu, the daughter of Māʻatu from Niuatoputapu, who was related to the Tuʻi Haʻatakalaua line. George, however, refused. In 1898, the King intended to marry Jane (Eugenie) von Treskow, the half-caste daughter of the German Vice-Consul Waldemar von Treskow, but Parliament registered its objection to this choice when it presented Tupou with its own nominations. Finally, on 1 June 1899, he took Lavinia Veiongo (1879–1902) as his wife. She was the daughter of Kupuavanua from Vavaʻu and Tōkanga from Niuafoʻou, thus obliging these islands to the throne. Kupuavanua was also, through his mother Lavinia Veiongo (1828–1907), a grandson of the last Tuʻi Tonga Laufilitonga, thus enabling him to claim rights to that line as well. Nevertheless, the marriage nearly started a civil war. For years, relations between the king and the rest of the country remained tense. In addition to his inept governance, this ongoing strain led in 1900 to Tonga's becoming a British protectorate.

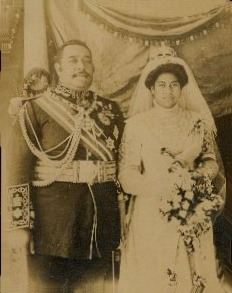
The marriage of Siaosi & Takipō

Queen Lavinia died on 25 April 1902 from tuberculosis, leaving one child, Sālote (born 13 March 1900). She was considered unpopular as she was perceived as being born from the 'wrong' mother; so much so that it was not safe for her to go outside the palace garden. When Siaosi married for the second time, on 11 November 1909, to the then 16-year-old ʻAnaseini Takipō Afuha'amango, a half-sister of the rejected ʻOfakivava'u, the chiefs were jubilant. It was customary in pre-modern Polynesia for a defeated chief either to be killed or to be exiled. As such, it was a fortunate excuse that Sālote had to go to school in Auckland and so she could be put on the December steamer to New Zealand.

Queen Anaseini Takipō was the daughter of Tae Manusa and Tevita Ula Afuha'amango. Tae Manusa was the highest ranking woman in Tonga (after the death of the last Tamahā) as she had a direct bloodline to Tu'iHa'atakalaua and Tu'iKanokupolu, which made her daughters the perfect option for Tupou II to marry.

Tae Manusa was the daughter of Penisimani Latuselu Kaho and his wife (also his first cousin) Ilaisa'ane Tupou'ahau (daughter of Maealiuaki Fatukimotulalo Tu'iHa'atakalaua). Penisimani Latuselu was also the son of Nunufa'ikea Tuita and Paluleleva Mulikiha'amea (sister of Maealiuaki and the Mehekitanga of Tupou'ahau). Both Nunufa'ikea and Paluleleva were great-grandchildren of King Ma'afu'o'Tu'itonga Tu'iKanokupolu, which made both Ofakivava'u and Takipō to be the most suitable brides for George Tupou II.

Sālote would remain in exile for 5 years. Queen Takipō had still not brought forth a son. Her first daughter, ʻOnelua (born 20 March 1911), died of convulsions while only six months, on 19 August 1911; her second daughter, ʻElisiva Fusipala Taukiʻonetuku (born 26 July 1912), eventually died from tubercular peritonitis on 21 April 1933 aged 20. The hope the envying chiefs had had on an heir through Takipō was fading, and the hope for supporters of Sālote's rose. The need to find a politically acceptable husband for her became imperative, and he was found in the end in Tungī Mailefihi, a cousin of ʻOfa.

Siaosi had also a few children from other women. Some of these descendants became prominent politicians in Fiji, such as Edward Cakobau. Other children became high-ranking chiefs in Tonga itself (Vīlai Tupou, father of Baron Vaea). His own government was ineffective with some ministers contemplated permitting British annexation of the country. The death of the king in April 1918 from tuberculosis was soon followed by his wife Takipō (1 March 1893 – 26 November 1918) who died during the infamous Spanish flu epidemic raging in Tonga. Siaosi's daughter Sālote succeeded him and was proclaimed Queen Sālote Tupou III.

== Honours ==
He was Grand Master of the Royal Orders of Tonga that he founded:

- Tonga:
  - Knight Grand Cross with Collar of the Royal Order of Pouono (KGCCP) (founded in 1893)
  - Knight Grand Cross of the Royal Order of King George Tupou I (founded ca. in 1876–1890)
  - Knight Grand Cross with Collar of the Royal Order of the Crown of Tonga (founded in 1913)

== Family tree ==
Tupou family tree

Tuʻi Haʻatakalaua line	Tuʻi Tonga line	Tuʻi Kanokupolu line
Kalolaine Fusimatalili	George Tupou I	Fīnau Kaunanga
Fifita Vavʻau	Tēvita ʻUnga	Sālote Mafile‘o Pilolevu	Filiaipulotu
Fusipala Taukiʻonetuku	Fatafehi Toutaitokotaha
Lavinia Veiongo	George Tupou II	ʻAnaseini Takipō
Viliami Tungī Mailefihi	Sālote Tupou III	Vīlai Tupou (illegitimate son)	Tupou Seini
Tāufaʻāhau Tupou IV	Halaevalu Mataʻaho ʻAhomeʻe	Siaosi 'Alipate Tupou, Baron Vaea	Tuputupu Ma'afu-'o-Tukuialahi
George Tupou V	Tupou VI	Nanasipauʻu Tukuʻaho
ʻIlima Lei Fifita Tohi (illegitimate daughter)	Tupoutoʻa ʻUlukalala	Sinaitakala Fakafanua
Taufaʻahau Manumataongo

- Fox, James J.; Sather, Clifford (1996). Origins, Ancestry and Alliance: Explorations in Austronesian Ethnography. Canberra: Department of Anthropology, Australian National University. p. 252. ISBN 978-0-7315-2432-7. OCLC 245762652.
- Kaeppler, Adrienne Lois; D.C. (2008). The Pacific Arts of Polynesia and Micronesia. Oxford: Oxford University Press. p. 90. ISBN 978-0-19-284238-1. OCLC 236158882.
- Völkel, Svenja (2010). Social Structure, Space and Possession in Tongan Culture and Language: An Ethnolinguistic Study. Amsterdam; Philadelphia: John Benjamins Publishing. p. 45. ISBN 978-90-272-0283-3.
- Wood-Ellem, Elizabeth (1999). Queen Sālote of Tonga: The Story of an Era 1900-1965. Auckland, N.Z: Auckland University Press. p. front. ISBN 978-0-8248-2529-4. OCLC 262293605.

Fatafehi Toutaitokotaha first had a child with Finau Fangupo (daughter of Lavaka Fanagupo of Pea)before he married and gave birth to George Tupou 2.

== Sources ==
- A.L. Kaeppler, M. Taumoefolau, N. Tukuʻaho, E. Wood-Ellem; Songs and poems of Queen Sālote; 2004; ISBN 978-982-213-008-9
- Eseta Fulivai Fusitu'a; King George Tupou II and the Government of Tonga; Thesis submitted for the degree of Master of Arts of the Australian National University; 1976;

Regnal titles
Preceded by George Tupou I	King of Tonga; 1893–1918	Succeeded by Sālote Tupou III
