= Royal Palace, Tonga =

Official residence of the King of Tonga

Coordinates: 21°07′53″S 175°12′02″W

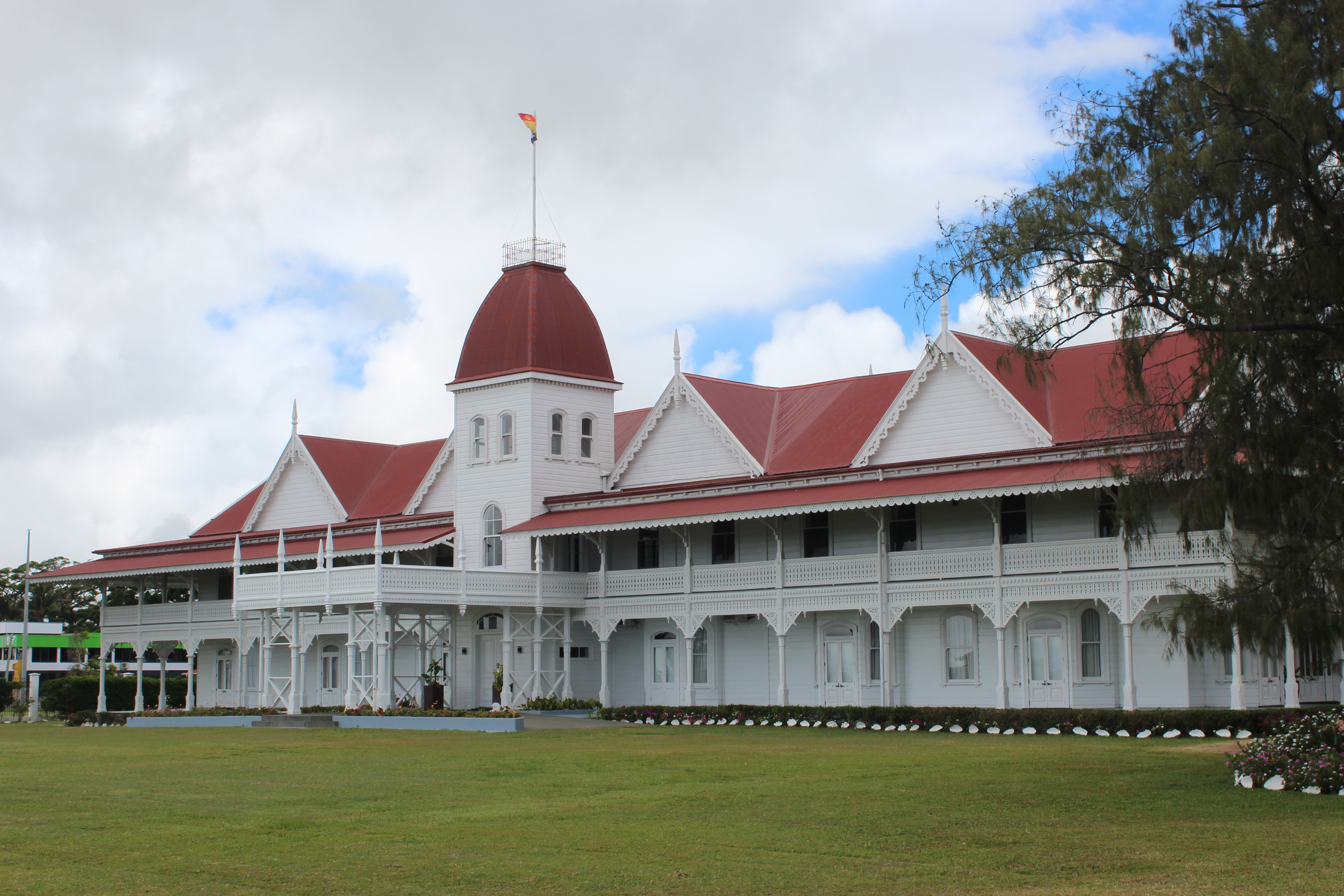
Tonga Royal Palace

The Royal Palace of the Kingdom of Tonga is located in the northwest of the capital, Nukuʻalofa, close to the Pacific Ocean. The wooden Palace, which was built in 1867, is the official residence of the King of Tonga. The palace is not open to the public, but it is easily visible from the waterfront.

== Overview ==
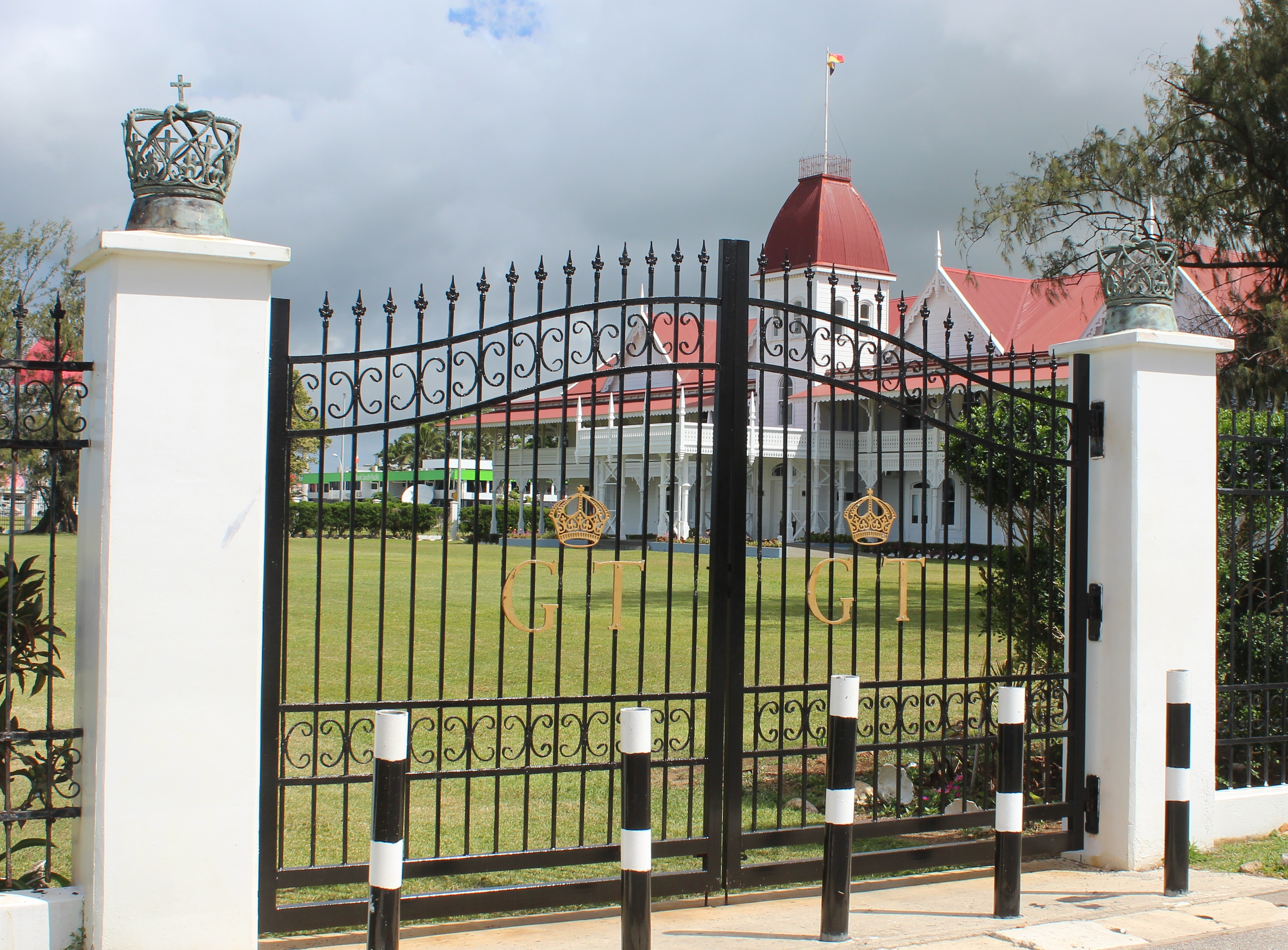
Gates

In line with the deference Tongans have for the Royal Family, poets almost never refer to the palace (pālasi) by name, but use heliaki or allegoric references like: Fanga-tapu ("sacred beach", for the stretch of shoreline fronting the building); Loto-ʻā ("inside the fence"); ʻĀ-maka ("stone fence"); and Hangai Tokelau ("north-wind-against"), the name of a tree near the kitchen, and so forth.

The old, metre-high stone fence was so sacred to the king that none would dare sit on it, let alone cross it. However, after 1990, King Tāufaʻāhau Tupou IV had a 3-metre high grid fence erected. After 2000, some people broke through the gates with trucks, prompting the installation of iron bars to secure the gates.

=== Other royal residences ===
The King and royal family have several more palaces to choose from. There is a palace in Fuaʻamotu, as well as Kauvai near Longoteme, Liukava ("revolution") in Kolovai, and both Tufumāhina and Vila (villa) between Koloua and Pea.

Vila was built by Crown Prince Tupoutoʻa in the 1990s, who lived there upon his accession as King George Tupou V, far away from any neighbours. Since his death, that palace has remained largely unused, but in 2010 major renovations were conducted. A new fence was erected and new wings added to house the Tongan National Archives on one side, and offices of the Privy Council of Tonga on the other side. It is expected that the present king will also hold royal audiences there again, instead of the now-deserted residence of the former British High Commissioner.

There is Tauʻakipulu palace on Lifuka in Haʻapai, Fangatongo ("mangrove beach") near Talau on Vavaʻu, and residences in Niuafoʻou and Niuatoputapu. The palace of ʻEua is just north of the harbour in Taʻanga. In the 1980s, King Taufa'ahau Tupou IV had a new palace built on a mountaintop near Houma, but it was unused and by around 1990 only the artistically made bathtub remained, overgrown by weeds and disappearing sometime around 2000.

== Significant events ==
In February 2017, a vigil marked by choral singing and small fires was held at the perimeter of the Royal Palace on the eve of the funeral of queen mother Halaevalu Mataʻaho ʻAhomeʻe, who died on 19 February.
