= Elizabeth Wood-Ellem =

Australian historian

Dr Elizabeth Wood-Ellem CCT (10 September 1930 – 8 September 2012) was a Tongan-born Australian historian and author of the definitive biography of Queen Sālote Tupou III of Tonga.

== Birth and family ==
Born Elizabeth Olive Wood near Nuku'alofa, Tonga, she was often known as Bess or Pesi Wood. She was a daughter of Reverend Dr A. Harold Wood OBE (1896–1989), a renowned Methodist then Uniting Church minister and educator, and medical Dr. Olive K. Wood (née O'Reilly). They were Australian missionaries in Tonga from 1924 to 1937. She had five brothers and sisters, including Janet Secomb, herself a missionary to Tonga, actor Monica Maughan, and Uniting Church minister and hymnologist Rev. Dr H. D'Arcy Wood.

== Career ==
Elizabeth moved to Australia in 1937, and was educated at Methodist Ladies' College in Melbourne where, in her final year, she topped the state of Victoria in Greek and Roman History.

At Melbourne University, she majored in English and History, gaining a BA in 1953. She later received her PhD there in 1982.

Wood-Ellem earned her living as a book editor and indexer, initially at Angus & Robertson in Sydney, then London (1960–72) with Macmillan and Paul Hamlyn. She later worked freelance.

She was appointed an archivist at King's College, Cambridge University, to sort and catalogue the papers of British novelist E. M. Forster after his death in 1970. Churchill College, Cambridge then engaged her as Assistant Librarian for Archives to catalogue Sir James Grigg's papers and A.V. Alexander's correspondence.

She completed a PhD in Tongan history in 1982 at the University of Melbourne and remained a Senior Fellow there at the time of her death. She published her biography of Queen Sālote of Tonga in 1999. Fairfax’s Pacific correspondent Mike Field said of it was "one of the finest pieces of historical research and insight, anthropology and understanding of Tonga that you’ll ever find."

Notable books she edited include The Songs and Poems of Queen Sālote (2004) and Tonga and the Tongans: Heritage and Identity (2007).

In 2008, King George Tupou V recognised her singular contribution to Tonga by bestowing on her the title of Commander of the Order of the Crown of Tonga.

== Publications ==
- Wood-Ellem, Elizabeth (1999). Queen Sālote of Tonga: The Story of an Era, 1900–1965. Auckland, N.Z.: Auckland University Press. ISBN 978-1-86940-205-1. OCLC 262293605. Archived from the original on 20 February 2012.

Notable books she edited include:

- The Songs and Poems of Queen Sālote (2004)
- Tonga and the Tongans: Heritage and Identity (2007)

== Honours ==
National honours

- Order of the Crown of Tonga, Commander (31 July 2008).
