= Tuʻi Kanokupolu =

Monarch of Tonga

Tuʻi Kanokupolu (chiefs) are a junior rank of the Haʻa Tuʻi (king's lineage) in Tonga.

== Terminology ==
The Haʻa Tuʻi Kanokupolu are described as Kau Halalalo. Kauhala means 'side of the road' and lalo means 'lower'. Thus, Kau Halalalo is the lower side of the road. The term Kau Halalalo differentiates the Haʻa Tuʻi Kanokupolu from the Haʻa Tuʻi Tonga who are the most senior and sacred members of the king's lineage. In contrast to Kau Halalalo, the Haʻa Tuʻi Tonga are the Kau Halaʻuta, meaning the 'higher side of the road'. In Muʻa Tongatapu, the ancient capital of Tonga and the traditional residence of the Haʻa Tuʻi Tonga, the Haʻa Tuʻi Tonga lived on the higher, inland side of the road, whereas, the Haʻa Tuʻi Kanokupolu lived on the lower, beach side of the road. In Muʻa Tongatapu, the settlement was expanded along the lower, beach side of the road. During Inasi ceremonies, when tributes were brought from the various chiefdoms (districts) of the Tonga empire to the Haʻa Tuʻi Tonga, the Haʻa Tuʻi Kanokupolu would arrive in canoes and settle along the beach. After presenting their tributes (such as fruit), the Haʻa Tuʻi Kanokupolu would return to their chiefdoms. Tupou is the title given to the Tuʻi Kanokupolu.

== Ngata, 1st Tuʻi Kanokupolu ==
The position of Haʻa Tuʻi Kanokupolu originated at the time of the Mo'unga'otonga, the sixth Tuʻi Haʻa Takalaua (king). Ngata was the youngest son of Moungatonga and Tohuʻia, a Samoan Taupou (Princess) from Upolu, Samoa who was the daughter of Samoan War Chief Ama of Safata. Ngata was sent to Hihifo district, Tongatapu, the western part of the Tongan empire, to govern the district on behalf of the Haʻa Tuʻi, the Tuʻi Tonga and the Tuʻi Haʻa Takalaua. Ngata was escorted by his uncle, Nuku and his cousin, Niukapu. (These events are depicted in the Ulutolu story). Ngata's venture was also supported by his mother's family, the Fale Haʻakili ('House of Haʻakili'). Throughout Tonga, the Fale Haʻakili are the traditional supporters of the Tuʻi Kanokupolu. Ngata married Vaʻetapu and Kaufoʻou, the two daughters of Ahomeʻe, a chief of Haʻavakatolo, Hihifo district. The children formed the first Tuʻi Kanokupolu chiefdom and resided in Hihifo. The chiefdom, the Haʻa Ngata, is divided into Haʻa Ngata Motuʻa (old Haʻa Ngata) and Haʻa Ngata Tupu.

=== Chiefs of the Haʻa Ngata Motuʻa clan ===
- ʻAhio (ʻulu)
- Kapukava
- Ata
- Veʻehala
- Vaha'i
- Afu
- ʻAhomeʻe
- Hafoka

== Atamataʻila, 2nd Tuʻi Kanokupolu ==
Atamataʻila was the son of Ngata and Kaufoʻou of Hihifo. He reinforced the office of the governor of Hihifo. When he married Tokilupe, the daughter of Tuʻi Haʻatuʻunga and the niece of Tuʻi Haʻamea, chief of the Central Tongan Empire. Atamataʻilaʻa daughter, Palula, was sent to be the wife of the eighth king of Tonga, Vaea Tangitau.

== Mataeletuʻapiko, 3rd Tuʻi Kanokupolu ==
Mataeletuʻapiko was the son of Atamataʻila and Tokilupe. He married Papahaʻamea, a daughter of the Tuʻi Haʻamea, chief of the Central Tongan Empire; Fatafehi, a daughter of the 31st Tuʻi Tonga, Kauʻulufonuafekai; and Tuʻimala, daughter of the Tuʻi Tonga, Fefine, of the Tamahā clan. The children of Mataeletuʻapiko formed the second clan of the Tuʻi Kanokupolu, the Haʻa Havea. The Haʻa Havea is divided into the Haʻa Havea Lahi, the older Havea clan of central Tonga and the Haʻa Havea Siʻi, the younger Havea clan of the Vavaʻu Islands.

=== Chiefs of the Haʻa Havea Lahi clan ===
- Ma'afu (ʻulu)
- Lavaka
- Fielakepa
- Fohe
- Tuʻivakanō
- Vaea
- Lasike (son of their sister)
- Mohulamu Momotu

=== Chiefs of Haʻa Havea Siʻi clan ===
- Ika
- Tu'ihalamaka
- Maka
- Faleʻosi
- Lapota

The Ha'a Tuʻi Kanokupolu's role is to take the responsibility that all the high Haʻa Tuʻi has for them in a royal funeral or wedding.

== Mataelehaʻamea, 4th Tuʻi Kanokupolu ==
Mataelehaʻamea was the eldest son of Mateletuʻapiko and Papahaʻamea, the daughter of the Tuʻi Haʻamea. Mataelehaʻamea went to war with his father in law, the eighth Tuʻi Haʻatakalaua Vaea to establish the Tuʻi Kanokupolu's control in central Tongan Empire. At this time, a number of social factors began to change: the Tuʻi Kanokupolu began to have power over the Tuʻi Haʻa Takalaua. The daughter of the Tuʻi Kanokupolu became the Moheofo (principal wife) of the Tuʻi Tonga (for example, Halaevalu and Tongotea wed Tuʻi Tonga). The Haʻa Tuʻi Kanokupolu became known as Haʻamoheofo: Haʻa means 'clan' and mohefo means 'principal wife of the Tongan king'. Mataelehaʻamea's son, Tuituiohu, formed the Haʻa Ngata Tupu clan in Vavaʻu. This clan became powerful in the time of Tuituiohu's son, 'Finau ʻUlukalala I, ruler of Vavaʻu and Haʻapai.

=== Chiefs of the Haʻa Ngata Tupu clan ===
- ʻUlukalala (ʻulu)
- Tuʻiʻoemoana
- Kapetaua
- Mapakaitolo
- Fakaʻiloatonga

== Vuna Tuʻi oe Tau, 5th Tuʻi Kanokupolu ==
Vuna Tuʻi 'oe Tau was the second son of Mataeletuʻapiko. He lost the support of the Haʻa Tuʻi Kanokupolu and left to Vavaʻu to established his own chiefdom. Vuna Tuʻi oe Tau was also challenged by his nephew Tuituiohu.

== Maʻafu ʻo Tuʻi Tonga, 6th Tuʻi Kanokupolu ==
Maʻafu ʻo Tuʻi Tonga was the eldest son of Mataelehaʻamea and Papa Haʻamea. The children of Maʻafu ʻo Tuʻi Tonga formed the Haʻa Maʻafu clan. Haʻa Maʻafu include the descendants of the Tuʻi Kanokopolu who do not belong to any other clan and the present day princes of the royal household. This community lives in the Kolomotuʻa (old settlement) and Kolofoʻou (new settlement) of Nukuʻalofa. His eldest son was Ngalumoetutulu by his wife Ate Fiunoa and Ngalumoetutulu was installed TUʻIHAʻAPAI.

== Tupoulahi, 7th Tuʻi Kanokupolu ==
Tupoulahi was the son of Maʻafuʻotuʻitonga. He built a fort in Nukuʻalofa. He later resigned from the Tuʻi Kanokupolu because of a lack of support from other Tuʻi Kanokupolu clans.

== Maealiuaki, 8th Tuʻi Kanokupolu ==
Maealiuaki was the son of Maʻafu ʻo Tuʻi Tonga. Maealiuaki retired at an advanced age and became the fifteenth Tuʻi Haʻatakalaua. He lived in Muʻa.

=== Captain Cook's observations ===
Captain James Cook visited Maealiuaki in 1777. Cook wrote:

We now heard, that there were other great men of the island, whom we had not as yet seen. Otago and Toobou, in particular mentioned a person named Mareewagee, who, they said, was of the first consequence in the place, and held in great veneration.

Cook also wrote about "Feenou" (Finau ʻUlukalala of Vavaʻu); "Toobou", chief of "Annamouka" (Tupou chief of Nomuka); "Tooboueitoa", king of the surrounding islands of "Kottoo" (Tupoutoʻa, high chief of Kotu and the surrounding islands of Haʻapai); "Poulaho" (Paulaho the Tuʻi Tonga) and his son, "Fattafaihe" (Fatafehi) who was about twelve years old at the time; and "Toobou" (most likely the Tuʻi Kanokupolu of the time, as they were addressed as Tupou). While Cook described Maealiuaki as "old and in retirement", he also noted that the Tupou was younger and going blind from an eye problem; that Maealiuaki and Tupou were brothers; that there was a peaceful interaction between all the chiefs; and that respect was paid to the Tuʻi Tonga Paulaho and his son, Fatafehi. Finau Tukuʻaho, left Vavaʻu to gather provisions for Cook. When Cook told Finau Tukuʻaho that he would follow him to Vavaʻu, Finau Tukuʻaho refused and advised Cook there was no safe anchorage in Vavaʻu. In fact, Vavaʻu has a good anchorage, which Finau did not wish to reveal to Cook.

== Tuʻi Halafatai, 9th Tuʻi Kanokupolu ==
Tuʻi Halafatai was the son of Tupoulahi muʻa.

== Tupoulahisiʻi, 10th Tuʻi Kanokupolu ==
Tupoulahisiʻi was the son of Tuʻi Halafatai.

== Mulikihaʻamea, 11th Tuʻi Kanokupolu ==
Mulikihaʻamea was the son of Maealiuaki. He resigned and following his father, became the 16th Tuʻi Haʻa Takalaua and lived in Muʻa. In 1797, Mulikhaʻamea received George Vason. In the same year, London Missionary Society (LMS) missionaries arrived.

=== Observations of George Vason ===
Vason wrote:

"The house of Mulkaamair, with whom I resided, was very spacious; its length was fifty feet. It was of an oval form. One large and lofty post was fixed in the centre; and round it, in an oval circle, were placed less posts, at equal distances, which formed the sides of the habitation. Upon these posts layers were fixed, to which rafters were fastened, that extended to the pillar in the middle, and united the whole building with it. The inside of the roof was ornamented with warm beautiful matting, which was sheltered on the outside with a skilful inter texture of the branches of the plantain tree. In rainy weather, screens of matting, called Takkabou, made of branches of the cocoa-nut-tree, were fastened to the side posts, which almost reached the eaves, and left only the door-way open, which was never closed, night nor day."
"Such spacious habitations are necessary for the chiefs, whose household, in general, is large, as composed of many attendants. But there are generally small apartments contiguous to the house, in which his wives and children lodge. One of his wives, however, for the most part, slept with him in the same room, in a space, separated from the rest by inclosures of Takkabou, or matting, three feet high, fitted up to the beams, that went across to the centre post, to keep it upright."
"The household of Mulkaamair was considerable. He had at different times from four to eight wives, eight sons and five daughters, besides many attendants. The children were all in great subjection to him, and of different rank and dignity, according to the rank of their respective mothers. For family dignity, in Tongataboo, descends not from the father, but the mother, owing, it is probable, to the frequency of divorce, and of illicit intercourse. "When the day declined, about seven o'clock, if they were not disposed to dance, they would retire to bed, or, more properly, to recline on their matting."
"But when they had retired, the most social employment of the day took place. As they lay reclining at their ease, Mulkaamair and his numerous household, that lay round him, would commence conversations, that amused them till they all fell asleep."
"I have been delighted, for hours, in listening to these nocturnal confabulations, and often very much surprised and improved, by the shrewdness of their observations, and the good sense of their reasonings. When they were all lain down, the chief would say, "Tou tellanoa". "Let us have some conversation." Another would answer, "Tou Tellanoa gee aha," i. e. " What shall we talk about." A third would reply, " Tou Tellanoa ge papa langee." " Let us talk of the men of the sky." They called us " the men of the sky," because, observing that the sky appeared to touch the ocean, in the distant horizon, and knowing that we came from an immense distance, they concluded that we must have come through the sky to arrive at Tongataboo."
"I have heard them for hours talking of us, our articles, dress, and customs, and entertaining each other with conjectures respecting the distance of the country, whence we came, the nature of it, its productions, and so on and so on."
"Their patriarchal mode of life, in which the younger and inferior part always surround the chief, as the father of one large family, is calculated much to refine and improve their mental faculties, and to polish their language and behaviour."
"The social intercourse and the ceremonious carriage, which were constantly kept up in the families of the chiefs, produced a refinement of ideas, a polish of language and expression, and an elegant gracefulness of manner, in a degree, as superior and distinct from those of the lower and laborious classes, as the man of letters, or the polished courtier differs from the clown. The lower orders used terms of a much meaner and coarser import: the higher orders were so much refined, as often, for amusement, to take off the vulgar by imitating their expressions and pronunciations. The family of Duatonga, if they spoke to any of the domestics, or visitors, would always be answered, " Ahee," " Yes Sire", but most others were answered with, " Cohou", Yes Sir; this latter term, if pronounced as it is spelt, would be a polite reply, but if spoken as if it was spelt Cohaa, it would be very vulgar, and signify our broad expression " What", and if spoken to a chief, the man would be struck down for his rudeness."
"Their nocturnal conversations would continue till ten or eleven in the evening, till they all fell asleep. Their conversation and comparisons were sometimes so very droll and ludicrous, that I occasionally burst out into a fit of laughter which would make them say " Coe Kata gee aha Balo" What are you laughing at Balo ? " Mannogge abai eyette ge mou touloo." '" He is making game of us I suppose". They called me by the name of Balo."
"If one chanced, during the night, to awake, he would renew the conversation with some neighbour that might happen to rouse, and then they would call to each other till they all awaked, and enjoy another hour's chat."

== Tupou Moheofo, 12th Tuʻi Kanokupolu ==
Tupou Moheofo was the daughter of Tupoulahi and the principal wife of the Tuʻi Tonga Paulaho. Her cousin, Tukuʻaho opposed her marriage. It is said he came from his home on ʻEua and said,

pali fie ule ('vagina wanting to be penis')

Tupou Moheofo was defeated by Tukuʻaho. He installed his own father, Mumui, the son of Maʻafu ʻo Tuʻi Tonga, as the thirteenth Tuʻi Kanokupolu. Vason described the incident between Tupou Moheofo and Tukuʻaho in 1797. Therefore, the incident must have happened some years earlier, as Mumui was already a king when Vason was in residence. Vason wrote,

"Amongst our visitors was Duatonga (Tuʻi Tonga), or Futtafaihe (Fatafehi), who, next to Dugonagaboola (Tuʻi Kanokupolu), was the most powerful chief in the Island. He was son of Poulaho, a descendant of those, who were supposed originally to have descended from the sky. When Captain Cook was at Tongataboo, this native was eleven years of age. After the death of his Father, which happened when he was too young to have any share in the government, his Mother lost the sovereignty. Toogahowe (Tukuʻaho), or Dugonagaboola (later Tuʻi Kanokupolu), who was a great warrior, wrested it from her, and then invested his Father Moomooe (Mumui) with it, who was the reigning chief, when we landed."

== Mumui, 13th Tuʻi Kanokupolu ==
Mumui was the son of Maʻafu ʻo Tuʻi Tonga. He was made Tuʻi Kanokupolu when his son defeated Tupou Moheofo. Mumui was the first Tuʻi Kanokupolu mention in the writing of George Vason and the LMS missionaries in 1797. Vason recorded Mumui's visit to the missionaries. He wrote,

"The venerable Moomooe (Mumui), the principal Chief, or Dugonagaboola (Tuʻi Kanokupolu) of the Island, soon arrived himself, and confirmed the message which Ambler had brought. Our interview with him and the rest of the natives, gave us a very pleasing impression of their disposition and manners."
"He made us a friendly offer of a habitation and land, at Aheefo (Hihifo), seventeen miles distant from the place of anchorage, near the residence of Toogahowe (Tukuʻaho), a principal Chief; that we might be under his protection. This Toogahowe (Tukuʻaho) was the son of Moomooe (Mumui), and nephew of Feenou Toogahowe (Finau Tukuʻaho), who was the friend of Captain Cook, and reigned over Eooa ʻEua, when that celebrated navigator landed on this Island. By a course of warlike exploits, in which his power over the other chiefs was confirmed, he became the Dugonagaboola (Tuʻi Kanokupolu), or principal chief of Tongataboo."

Vason reported the death of Mumui not long after their arrival. He wrote,

"Soon after this, Moomooe, the reigning chief, died. His disorder and danger excited great concern through the Island, and one of his own sons was slain, through a delusive hope that his health and strength would be communicated to his dying Father."
"But it is beyond the power of description, to paint the dreadful scene of horror and bloodshed, which took place at his funeral, and continued to be acted round his tomb, for weeks after. Two of his wives were strangled at the Fiatooka (Fa'itoka), or burying place, at the time his body was deposited there. The Fiatooka (Fa'itoka) was a large inclosed space with a lofty funeral pile in the middle, of a pyramidical form, round which, the bodies of the Chiefs had been laid for ages past, in a solemn range of rude dignity. The space round the tomb was on this occasion a palaestra for savage gladiators. Hundreds ran about it, with ferocious emulation, to signalize their grief for the venerated chief, or their contempt of pain and death, by inflicting on themselves the most ghastly wounds, and exhibiting spectacles of the greatest horror. Thousands, ere the period of mourning wasi over, fought with each other, and cut themselves with sharp instruments, to testify by bloody scars, their sorrow for their beloved Moomooe."
"It was an awful scene indeed! Night after night, we heard for some weeks, the horrid sound of the conch-shell, rousing these deluded creatures to these dreadful rites of mourning for the dead; and shrieks, and clashing arms, and the rushing and violence of the multitude, re-echoed round our abode; and rendered it a scene of continual horror and alarm."
"At length these shocking ceremonies ceased, and all the chiefs assembled for the purpose of electing a supreme."

== Tukuʻaho, 14th Tuʻi Kanokupolu ==
Tukuʻaho was the son of Mumui. He was a fierce warrior and a respected leader. He was elected Tuʻi Kanokupolu after the death of Mumui. Vason wrote,

"Toogahowe, who by his superior prowess in the field, had awed the neighbouring Islands as well as Tongataboo, and had placed his Father Moomooe (Mumui) in the post of distinction, had, ever since, strengthened his power with the chiefs by making them his companions and friends. in the post of distinction, had, ever since, strengthened his power with the chiefs by making them his companions and friends. No sooner therefore were they met, in public assembly, than one stepped forth from the circle, and proclaimed, "Do bou Toogahowe Dugonagaboola fy talliaba gee ma toolou" that is, Toogahowe shall be the chief, and we will do as we please; upon which he was unanimously elected, as none dare to oppose him."
"Futtafaihe had entertained the hope of regaining, by the vote of this general assembly, the family authority, which his Mother had lost: but as Toogahowe was elected the Dugonagaboola, by the voice of the chiefs, he thought it best quietly to acquiesce in their decision."
"We soon became intimate with many of the chiefs; and in separate parties, often joined them in distant excursions, and were treated with the best of every thing which the Island afforded." (Note: The above translation for the proclamation was the original translation by Vason, however, the translation could be more exact as "Tupou Tukuʻaho Tuʻi Kanokupolu faʻiteliha kiamautolu" or in English, 'Tupou Tukuʻaho do as you please of us". The editors translation is based on the use of "gee ma toolou " as in "kimautolu" and not "pe mautolu").)

The LMS missionaries, who all stayed under the protection of Tukuʻaho in Hihifo, were then divided up into the districts and their chiefs. This gives a useful record of all the great chiefs in Tonga during this time. Again, Vason wrote,

"Upon this point, a deputation was sent to consult our old chief Toogahowe, who was now Dugonagaboola, under whose protection we lived, who was of chief authority in the Island. The plan receiving his approbation, we took leave of each other. Two went to live with Vahargee, at Ardeo, one with Moolee, in the district of Ahogge; an inferior chief, but an industrious man, and possessed of a considerable tract of fertile land. One went alone to live with one Mulkaamair, the first chief in the Island, next to Dugonagaboola. Two went to live with Duatonga, at Mooa, and three remained at Aheefo." (Note: This quote indicates that the plan to separate the missionaries was approved by Tukuʻaho the Tuʻi Knaokupolu, who protected them in Hihifo. The plan was that two missionaries would stay with Vahaʻi in Haʻateiho; one would go to Muli (a lower chief) in Hahake; one would go to Mulikihaʻamea, the second highest chief in Tonga; and two would go to the Tuʻi Tonga at Muʻa. The three remaining missionaries stayed in Hihifo with the Tuʻi Kanokupolu.)

This quote indicates that the plan to separate the missionaries was approved by Tukuʻaho the Tuʻi Knaokupolu, who protected them in Hihifo. The plan was that two missionaries would stay with Vahaʻi in Haʻateiho; one would go to Muli (a lower chief) in Hahake; one would go to Mulikihaʻamea, the second highest chief in Tonga; and two would go to the Tuʻi Tonga at Muʻa. The three remaining missionaries stayed in Hihifo with the Tuʻi Kanokupolu. The record gives insight into the social hierarchy of the ruling parties. Tukuʻaho was the most powerful but not necessarily the highest ranked Tuʻi Kanokupolu. Mulikihaʻamea was the second most powerful chief of Tonga. At this time, he resigned to become the eleventh Tuʻi Haʻatakalaua. The chief, Vahaʻi, (later renounced in the civil war) was in Haʻateiho and most likely controlled the central region. The Tuʻi Tonga at Muʻa was Fatafehi, son of Paulaho, who was twelve years old during Cook's visit in 1777. Fatafehi had aspired to be elected as Tuʻi Kanokupolu to recover the position his mother lost to Tukuʻaho. Tukuʻaho was assassinated by Tupouniua and ʻUlukalala with the consent of Mulikihaʻamea.

== Maʻafu ʻo Limuloa, 15th Tuʻi Kanokupolu ==
Maʻafu ʻo Limuloa was promoted by the Haʻa Havea (the House of Havea) and became Tuʻi Kanokupolu. The very same night, he was murdered by the members of the Haʻa Ngata (House of Ngata) who had supported Tukuʻaho.

Fohe (ulu) . Ma'afu

== Tupou Malohi, 16th Tuʻi Kanokupolu ==
Tupou Malohi was appointed after a long interregnum in 1808, when the quarreling chiefs finally put their differences aside in order to forestall the ambitions of Tupoutoʻa. But Tupou Mālohi was weak, not able to withstand the quarreling chiefs, resigned a year later, and went to Haʻapai. On the official list, Tupou Malohi retained his title until his death in 1812.

== Tupoutoʻa, 17th Tuʻi Kanokupolu ==
Tupoutoʻa was the son of Tukuʻaho. The chiefs considered him an "upstart" because he claimed the title of Tu'i Kanokupolu but had not been officially recognised. Tupoutoʻa also associated with his assassins. The chiefs did not formally denounce Tupoutoʻa because they were battling each other. One of the most powerful chiefs, Takai, recognised Tupoutoʻa in 1813 but he was the only one. Tupoutoʻa died in 1820.

== Aleamotuʻa (Josiah Tupou), 18th Tuʻi Kanokupolu ==
ʻAleamotuʻa was the son of Mumui. He became Tuʻi Kanokupolu in 1826 and was installed on 7 December 1827 in the Pangai at Hihifo by the Haʻa Ngata and Haʻa Havea. Aleamotuʻa became a Christian and was baptised on 18 January 1830 by Mr Turner, a Methodist Missionary. He married Mary Moala in a Christian ceremony on the same date. He died in 1845.

== Tāufaʻāhau, 19th Tuʻi Kanokupolu ==
Tāufaʻāhau was the son of Tupoutoʻa. Prior to his death, Josiah Tupou named two possible successors. Tāufaʻāhau was baptised and installed as "His Majesty, King George Tāufaʻāhau Tupou I".

== His Majesty, King Tāufaʻāhau Tupou IV, 22nd Tuʻi Kanokupolu ==
Tāufaʻāhau Tupou IV was the son of Her Majesty, Queen Salote Tupou III and Chief Tungi. As a Crown Prince he was known as Tupoutoʻa and later inherited his father's title, Tungi. He ascended to the throne in 1965 and retained the title Tungi, while the title Tupoutoʻa was passed on to the Crown Prince.

== His Majesty, King George Tupou V, 23rd Tuʻi Kanokupolu ==
He succeeded his father in 2006 and reigned until his death in 2012.

== His Majesty, King Tupou VI, 24th Tuʻi Kanokupolu ==
After the death of his older brother King George Tupou the V he inherited the throne due his brother not having descendants.

== External sources ==
- Official Web Site of The Tongan Monarchy.
- Malo Tonga Tuputupulefanua Tu'ikanokupolu Cocker 2000
