= Culture of Tonga =

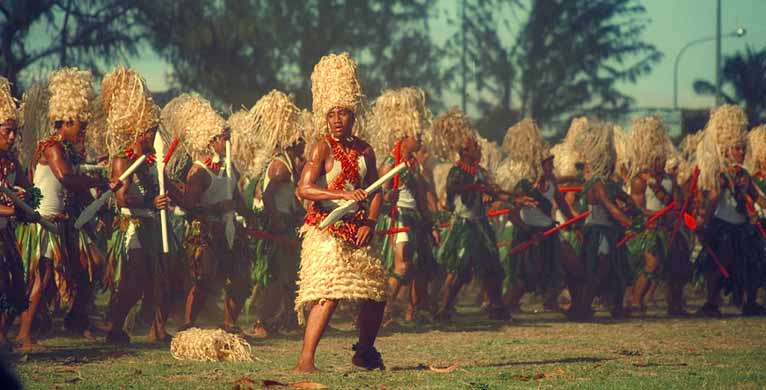
Tonga College students performing a traditional Kailao dance.

The Tongan archipelago has been inhabited for perhaps 3,000 years, since settlement in late Lapita times. The culture of its inhabitants has surely changed greatly over this long time period. Before the arrival of European explorers in the late 17th and early 18th centuries, the Tongans were in frequent contact with their nearest Oceanic neighbors, Fiji and Samoa. In the 19th century, with the arrival of Western traders and missionaries, Tongan culture changed dramatically. Some old beliefs and habits were thrown away and others were adopted. Some accommodations made in the 19th century and early 20th century are now being challenged by changing Western civilization. Hence Tongan culture is far from a unified or monolithic affair, and Tongans themselves may differ strongly as to what it is "Tongan" to do, or not do. Contemporary Tongans often have strong ties to overseas lands. They may have been migrant workers in New Zealand, or have lived and traveled in New Zealand, Australia, or the United States. Many Tongans now live overseas, in a Tongan diaspora, and send home remittances to family members (often aged) who prefer to remain in Tonga. Tongans themselves often have to operate in two different contexts, which they often call anga fakatonga, the traditional Tongan way, and anga fakapālangi, the Western way. A culturally adept Tongan learns both sets of rules and when to switch between them.

Any description of Tongan culture that limits itself to what Tongans see as anga fakatonga would give a seriously distorted view of what people actually do, in Tonga, or in diaspora, because accommodations are so often made to anga fakapālangi. The following account tries to give both the idealized and the on-the-ground versions of Tongan culture.

== Livelihood ==
Traditionally, fishing and farming have accounted for the livelihood of a majority of Tongans. The main food crops include sweet potatoes, bananas, yucca, taro and giant taro. Cash crops include squash and pumpkins, which have in recent years replaced bananas and copra as the largest agricultural exports. Vanilla is another important cash crop.

== Life passages ==
=== Male circumcision ===
In post-contact Tonga, newly pubescent males were kamu (tefe), or circumcised by cutting one slit in the foreskin, on the underside of the penis. This is a Christian practice of biblical context. Afterwards, the family held a feast for the new "man". Circumcision is still practiced, but it is now done informally. Sometimes it is done at home, with relatives present. More commonly, a boy, or a group of boys, goes to the hospital, where the operation is done under sanitary conditions.

=== First menstruation (Menarche) ===
In pre-contact Tonga, a girl's first menstruation was celebrated by a feast. This practice continued up until the mid-20th century, at which point it fell out of favor.

=== Death ===
Contemporary funerals are large, well-attended occasions, even for Tongans who are not wealthy. Relatives gather, often traveling long distances to do so. Large amounts of food are contributed, then distributed to the crowds during and after the funeral. Funeral practices are a mix of introduced Christian rites and customs (such as a wake and a Christian burial), and older indigenous customs that survive from pre-contact times. For instance, mourners wear black (a Western custom) but also wrap mats (ta'ovala) around their waist. The type and size of the mat proclaim the mourner's relationship to the deceased. Immediate family members might also choose to wear a worn or frayed ta'ovala to show respect and love for their family that has passed on.

Tongan families do not necessarily compete to put on the largest, grandest funeral possible, but they do strive to show respect for the deceased by doing all that is customary. This can put great strain on the resources of the immediate family and even the extended family. Sometimes the funeral is called a fakamasiva, an occasion that leads to poverty.

== Crime ==
Violent crime is limited, but increasing, and public perception associates this with returns of ethnic Tongans who have been raised overseas. A few notable cases involve young men who were raised since infancy in the United States, whose families neglected to obtain citizenship for them and who were thus deported due to confrontations with the American justice system. At this moment crime is increasing faster than the police force is able to counter, and is expected to become a serious problem in the years to come. Increasing wealth has also increased the gap between the rich and the poor, leading to greater numbers of burglaries.

Currently, most prisons in Tonga still abide by the old laissez-faire attitude. Often, these prisons have no fences, no iron bars, and lax security, which makes escape very easy for inmates. This system is slowly changing, due to the influx of foreign born/raised criminals who may treat such goodwill-based incarceration systems with contempt. Traditionally, there is little social stigma regarding incarceration (although this too is changing), which means that imprisonment does not serve as a strong deterrent against crime.

Tonga also struggles with young offenders - "schoolboys who want to have money to show off" - who have been apprehended in burglaries. As there are no juvenile prisons, young offenders are incarcerated in the main prisons together with adult criminals. Previously, attempts were made to temporarily exile young offenders to Tau, a small island offshore Tongatapu but this was later abandoned.

In the 1990s, Chinese immigration caused resentment among the native Tongan population (especially those from Hong Kong, who purchased Tongan passports to escape the Beijing takeover). Some violent crimes have been directed towards these Chinese immigrants.

== Art ==
=== Literature ===
==== Modern poetry and short stories ====
The genre of short stories in Tonga is most associated with 'Epeli Hau'ofa, whose most popular collection of stories, Tales of the Tikong, was published in 1973. Konai Helu Thaman was one of the country's earliest published poets.

=== Traditional women's crafts ===
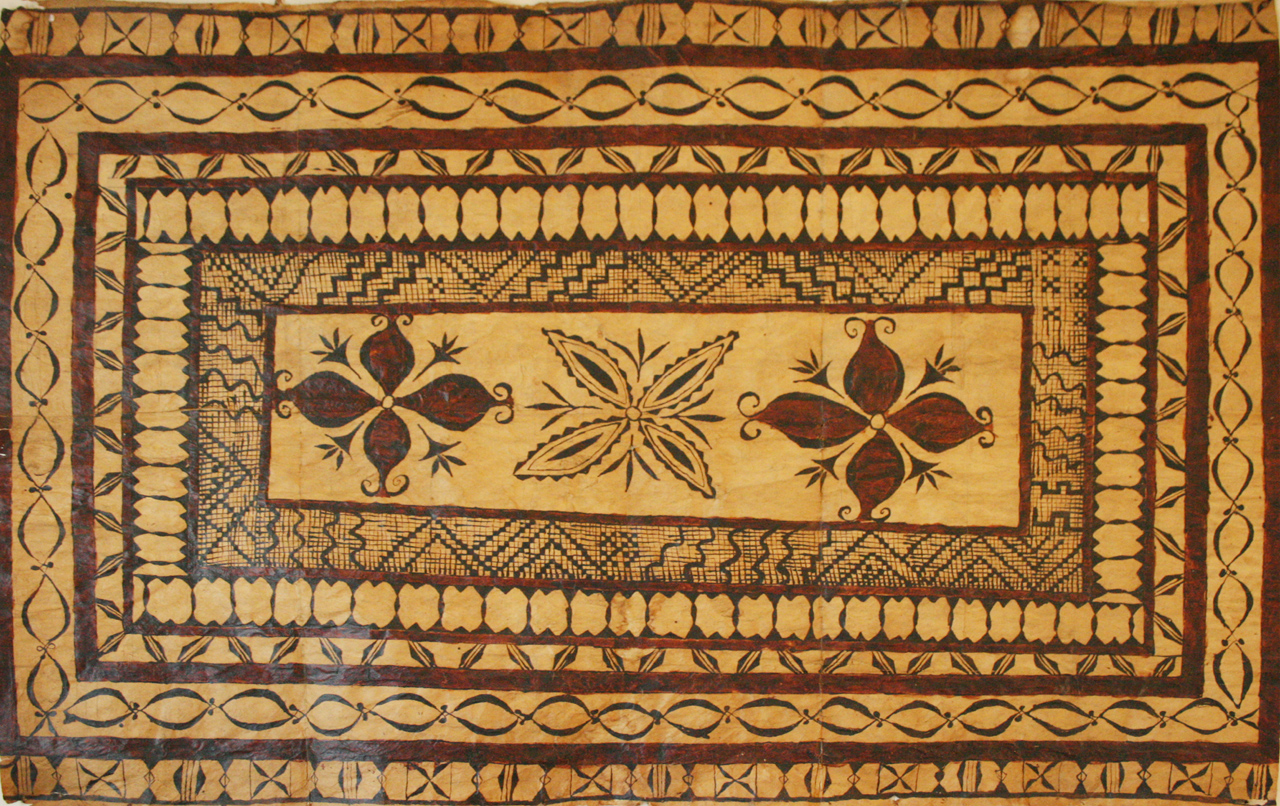
Tongan tapa

In pre-contact Tonga, women did not do the cooking (cooking in an earth oven was hard, hot work, the province of men) or work in the fields. They raised children, gathered shellfish on the reef, and made koloa, barkcloth and mats, which were a traditional form of wealth exchanged at marriages and other ceremonial occasions. An industrious woman thus raised the social status of her household. Her family also slept soundly, on the piles of mats and barkcloth that were the traditional bedding. On sunny days, these were spread on the grass to air, which prolonged their life. The mats can also be worn as ta'ovala, which is worn around the waist. Wearing the ta'ovala is a sign of respect, and it is said that in early times men returning from a long voyage at sea would cover up these mats before visiting the chief of the village.

Among the typical koloa are:

- Bark cloth, or tapa (but it is called ngatu in Tonga)
- Mats
- Waist mats, called taʻovala
- Waist girdles, called kiekie
- And any other type of traditional (dance) clothing

==== Mat-weaving ====
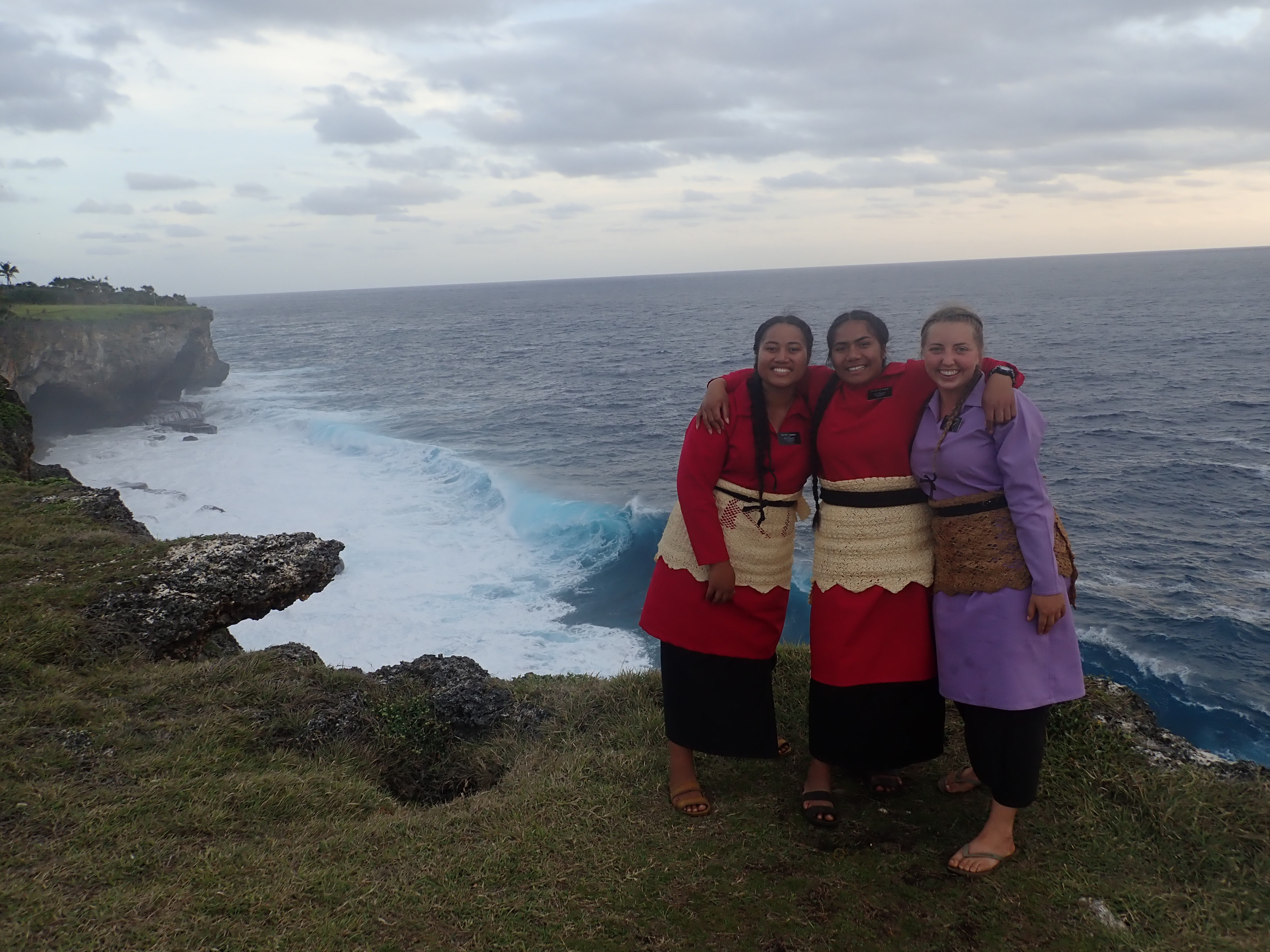
Missionaries wearing traditional woven mats - called ta'ovala

Woven mats serve a variety of purposes, from the ordinary to the ceremonial. Many woven mats are passed down from generation to generation, acquiring greater status with the passage of time. It is in fact a collection of these mats in the palace that forms the true crown jewels of Tonga. These royal mats are displayed only on high state occasions such as the death of a member of the royal family or the coronation of a monarch.

=== Traditional men's crafts ===
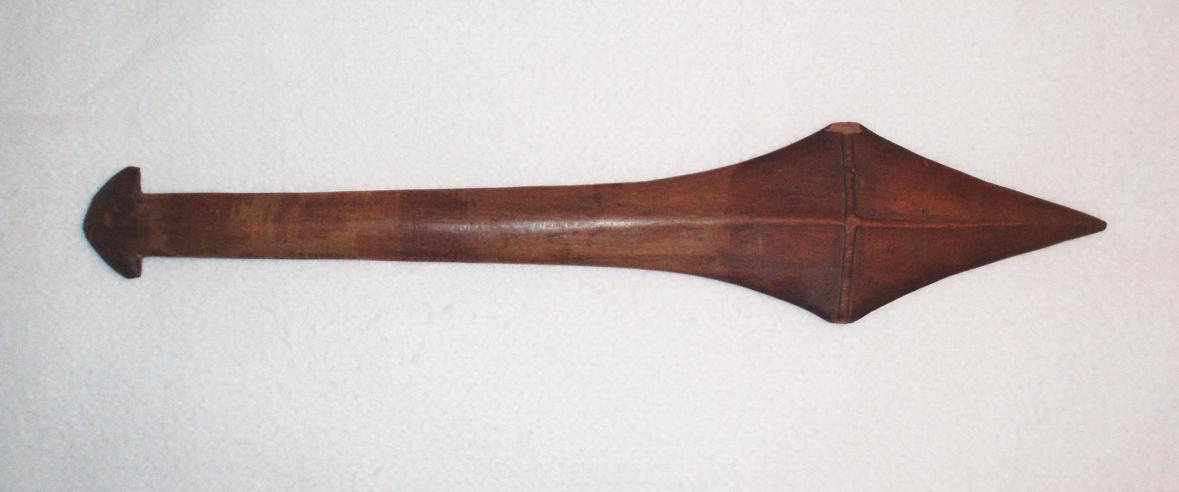
Tongan war clubs like the one pictured above were presented as gifts to visiting Allied military personnel during World War II. They were also used for canoe paddles and for war dances, e.g. Me'etu'upaki.

==== Wood carving ====
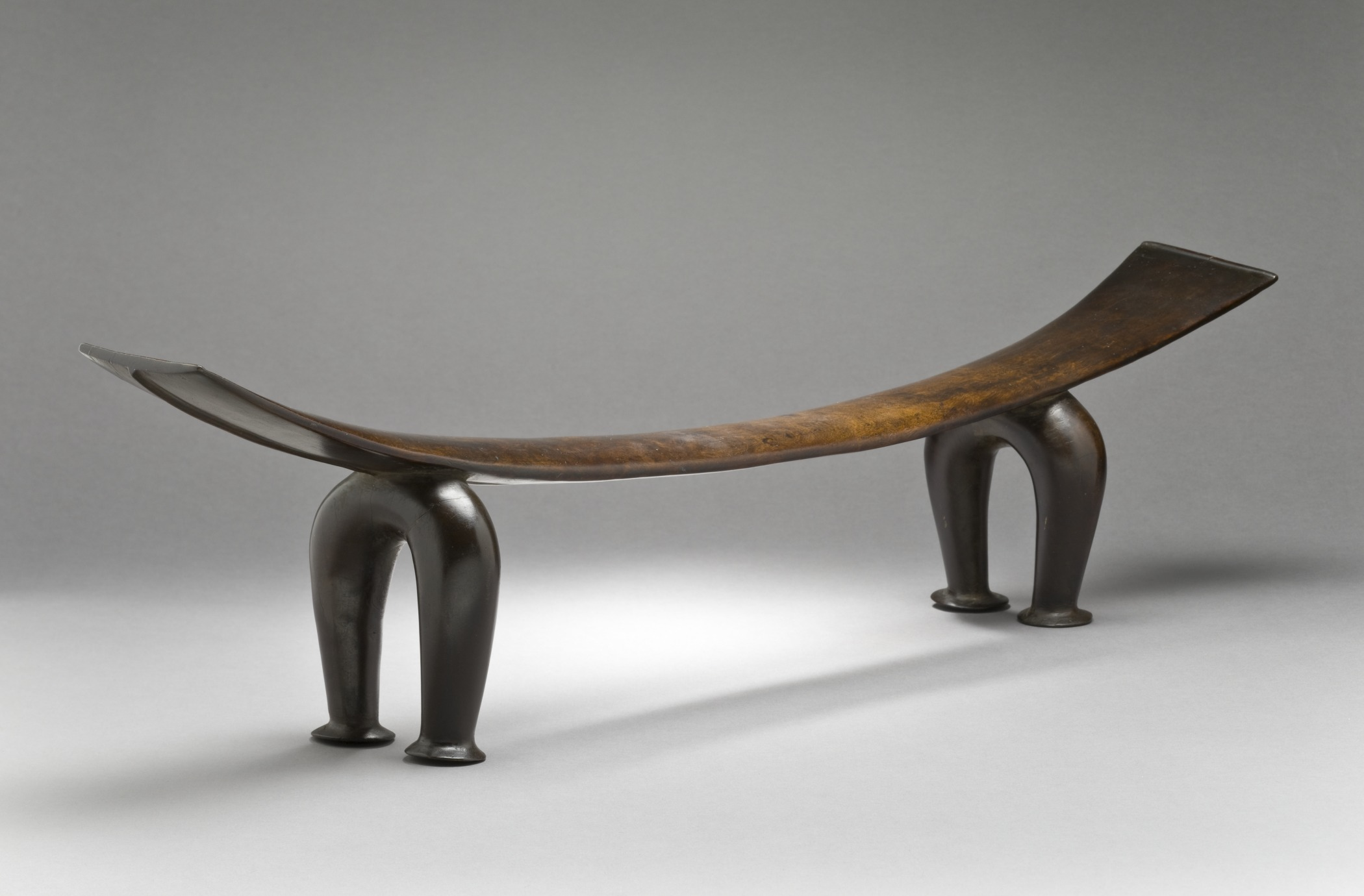
Kali, circa 1850, from the LACMA collections

Before Western contact, many objects of daily use were made of carved wood: food bowls, head rests (kali), war clubs and spears, and cult images. Tongan craftsmen were skilled at inlaying pearl-shell and ivory in wood, and Tongan war clubs were treasured items in the neighboring archipelago of Fiji.

==== Canoe-building ====
Tongan craftsman were also adept at building canoes. Many canoes for daily use were simple pōpaos, dug-out canoes, shaped from a single log with fire and adze and outfitted with a single outrigger. Due to a dearth of large trees suitable for building large war canoes, these canoes were often imported from Fiji.

==== Traditional navigation techniques ====
Tongan navigators used wayfinding techniques such as the navigation by the stars, and observations of birds, ocean swells, and wind patterns, and relied on a large body of knowledge from oral tradition. Anthropologist David Lewis, in the 1960s & 1970s, confirmed that traditional navigation techniques had been retained by navigators from Tonga in conversations with Fe’iloakitau Kaho, Ve’ehala and Kaloni Kienga.

These wayfinding techniques were similar to those of other Polynesian navigators, which skills were also retained into the late 20th Century by navigators of the Caroline Islands and the Santa Cruz Islands.

==== Traditional architecture ====
The tradition Tongan fale consisted of a curved roof (branches lashed with sennit rope, or kafa, thatched with woven palm leaves) resting on pillars made of tree trunks. Woven screens filled in the area between the ground and the edge of the roof. The traditional design was extremely well adapted to surviving hurricanes. If the winds threatened to shred the walls and overturn the roof, the inhabitants could chop down the pillars, so that the roof fell directly onto the ground. Because the roof was curved, like a limpet shell, the wind tended to flow over it smoothly. The inhabitants could ride out the storm in relative safety.

There are many surviving examples of Tongan stone architecture, notably the Haʻamonga ʻa Maui and mound tombs (langi) near Lapaha, Tongatapu. And so several on other islands. Archaeologists have dated them hundreds to a thousand years old.

==== Tattooing ====
Tongan males were often heavily tattooed. In Captain Cook's time only the Tuʻi Tonga (king) was not: because he was too high ranked for anybody to touch him. Later it became the habit that a young Tuʻi Tonga went to Samoa to be tattooed there.

The practice of Tātatau disappeared under heavy missionary disapproval, but was never completely suppressed. It is still very common for men (less so, but still some for women), to be decorated with some small tattoos. Nevertheless, tattoos shows one's strength. Tattoos also tell a story.

=== Domestication of Western arts and crafts ===
==== Western textile arts ====
Tonga has evolved its own version of Western-style clothing, consisting of a long tupenu, or sarong, for women, and a short tupenu for men. Women cover the tupenu with a kofu, or Western-style dress; men top the tupenu either with a T-shirt, a Western casual shirt, or on formal occasions, a dress shirt and a suit coat. Preachers in some Methodist sects still wear long frock coats, a style that has not been current in the West for more than a hundred years. These coats must be tailored locally.

Tongan outfits are often assembled from used Western clothing (for the top) mixed with a length of cloth purchased locally for the tupenu. Used clothing can be found for sale at local markets, or can be purchased overseas and mailed home by relatives.

Some women have learned to sew and own sewing machines (often antique treadle machines). They do simple home-sewing of shirts, kofu, and school uniforms.

Nukuʻalofa, the capital, supports several tailoring shops. They tailor tupenu and suitcoats for Tongan men, and matching tupenu and kofu for Tongan women. The women's outfits may be decorated with simple blockprint patterns on the hems.

There is also some local production of knit jerseys by Tongans operating imported sergers. They produce on speculation and sell at the Nukuʻalofa market.

Women who attend the Wesleyan Methodist girls' school, Queen Sālote College, are taught several Western handicrafts, such as embroidery and crochet. They learn to make embroidered pillowcases and bed coverings or crocheted lace tablecloths, bedcovers, and lace trim. However, Western-style handicrafts such as these have not become widely popular outside the school setting. They require expensive imported materials that can only be purchased in major towns. Village women are much more likely to turn their efforts to weaving mats or beating barkcloth, which can be done with free local material.

==== Painting ====
A few Tongan village churches are decorated with freehand murals or decorations done in house paint, which may mix crosses, flowers, and traditional barkcloth motifs. The practice is uncommon and the execution is always crude.

==== Coral and tortoise-shell jewelry ====
In the 1970s there was a small factory near Nukuʻalofa that made simple jewelry from coral and tortoise-shell for sale to Western tourists. It is not clear if this factory is still operating. The government may have protected sea-turtles and corals (as has been done in most other countries) and ended this line of manufacture.

=== Contemporary Tongan art ===
There has been a huge surge of Contemporary Tongan artists in the past decade, majority based in New Zealand. Tanya Edwards works with ngatu (bark cloths), Benjamin Work, Telly Tuita, and Sione Monū are widely exhibited internationally, Sēmisi Fetokai Potauaine built a 5-storey Tongan sculpture in central Christchurch. In 2023, Bergman Gallery hosted Tukufakaholo, Tongan Contemporary in Auckland, New Zealand featuring eight Tongan artists.

== Music and dance ==
Scholars know relatively little about the music of Tonga as it existed before Tonga was encountered by European explorers. Early visitors, such as Captain Cook and the invaluable William Mariner, note only the singing and drumming during traditional dance performances. Scholars can assume the existence of the lali or slit-gong, and the nose flute, as these survived to later times. Traditional songs, passed down over the generations, are still sung at chiefly ceremonies. Some ancient dances are still performed, such as ula, ʻotuhaka and meʻetuʻupaki.

=== Church music ===
Methodists were known for their extensive use of hymns in their emotional services. True to their tradition, the early missionaries introduced hymn-singing to their congregations. These early hymns—still sung today in some of the Methodist sects, such as the Free Church of Tonga and the Church of Tonga - have Tongan tunes and simple, short Tongan lyrics. There is a special Tongan music notation for these, and other, musics.

=== Traditional music ===
Traditional music is preserved in the set pieces performed at royal and noble weddings and funerals, and in the song sung during the traditional ceremony of apology, the lou-ifi. Radio Tonga begins each day's broadcast with a recording from Honourable Veʻehala, a nobleman and celebrated virtuoso of the nose flute. This music is not popular music; it is a cherished heirloom, preserved by specialists and taught as needed for special occasions.

=== Traditional Tongan dances ===
- Tau'olunga
- Otuhaka
- Ula
- Milolua
- Soke
- Lakalaka
- Ma'ulu'ulu
- Mako
- Kailao
- Me'etu'upa'aki
- Taufakaniua
- Sipi Tau

== Cuisine ==
Women cooking topai for mourners.

In former times, there was only one main meal, a midday meal cooked in an earth oven. Villagers would rise, eat some leftover food from the previous day's meal, and set out to work in the fields, fishing, gathering shellfish, etc. The results of the morning's work would be cooked by the men, and served to the assembled household. The remnants would be placed in a basket suspended from a tree. This food is served as an end-of-the-day snack as well as the next day's breakfast. Food past its prime was given to the pigs.

The diet consisted mainly of taro, yams, bananas, coconuts, and fish baked in leaves; shellfish were usually served raw, as a relish. The liquid from the center of coconuts was commonly drunk, and the soft "spoon meat" of young coconuts much relished. Baked breadfruit was eaten in season; said fruit itself as well as the banana and taro could be stored in pits until fermented into a unique staple preserve known as mā. Pigs were killed and cooked only on special occasions, such as weddings, funerals, feasts honoring a visiting chief, and the like. Tongans also ate chickens. They have also acquired a liking for meat of horses (hoosi, previously puaka papālangi) which were originally brought by British sailors intended to be bred as transportation for missionaries; one delicacy is a braised dish with coconut milk called loʻi hoosi.

Food could be stored by feeding it to pigs. Pre-contact Tongans also built elevated storehouses for yams. Yams would keep only a few months. Hence a household's main security was generous distribution of food to relatives and neighbors, who were thus put under an obligation to share in their turn.

Many new foods were introduced in the 19th and early 20th centuries, following Western contacts and settlements. The cassava plant was one such introduction; it is called manioke in Tongan. While it lacks the prestige of the yam, it is an easy plant to grow and a common crop. Introduced watermelons became popular. They were eaten either by themselves, or pulped and mixed with coconut milk, forming a popular drink called 'otai. Other fruits, such as oranges, lemons, and limes, became popular. Tongans also adopted onions, green onions, cabbage, carrots, tomatoes, and other common vegetables. In the last few decades, Tongan farmers with access to large tracts of land have engaged in commercial farming of pumpkins and other easily shipped vegetables as cash crops.

Tongans now consume large quantities of imported flour and sugar. One dish that uses both is topai (doughboys), flour and water worked into a paste and dropped into a kettle of boiling water, then served with a syrup of sugar and coconut milk. Topai are a common funeral food, being easily prepared for hundreds of mourners.

There are now bakeries in the larger cities. The most popular loaves are soft, white, and bland. There are also local soft drink bottlers, who make various local varieties of soda. A Tongan who might once have breakfasted on bits of cooked pork and yam from a hanging basket may now have white bread and soda for breakfast.

Purchased prepared foods have also made great headway, even in remote villages. Canned cornbeef is a great favorite. It is eaten straight from the can, or mixed with coconut milk and onions, wrapped in leaves, and baked in the earth oven. Tongans also eat canned fish, such as tuna. In villages or towns with refrigeration, cheap frozen "mutton flaps" imported from New Zealand are popular. Tongans also eat the common South Pacific "ship's biscuit", hard plain crackers once a shipboard staple. These crackers are called mā pakupaku ("dry meal").

Tongans no longer make an earth oven every day. Most daily cooking is done by women, who cook in battered pots over open fires in the village, in wood-burning stoves in some households, and on gas or electric ranges in some of the larger towns. The meal schedule has also changed, to more Westernized breakfast, light lunch, and heavy dinner. Tongans say that the old schedule is unworkable when household members have Western-style jobs, or attend schools at some distance from home; such family members cannot come home to eat, then have a doze after a heavy mid-day meal.

As well as drinking soda, Tongans now drink tea and coffee. Usually this is of the cheapest variety, and served with tinned condensed milk.

Some men drink alcohol. Sometimes this is imported Australian or New Zealand beer; more often it is home-brew, hopi, made with water, sugar or mashed fruit, and yeast. Imported drinks are sold only to Tongans who have liquor permits, which require a visit to a government office, and limit the amount of alcohol which can be purchased. There are no such formalities with hopi. Drinking is usually done secretively; a group of men gather and drink until they are drunk. Such gatherings sometimes result in drunken quarrels and assaults.

=== Traditional Tongan dishes ===
- Lū
- 'otai
- 'ota ika
- Vai siaine

=== Kava ===
Formal kava drinking is an important and intrinsic part of Tonga culture. However, the drinking of kava by men at kava clubs is somewhat equal to drinking beers in the bar in western cultures.

=== Tongan cuisine and health ===
Tonga is notable for its high obesity rates with over 90% of the population being overweight. Consequently, many Tongan islanders have an increased risk of heart disease, diabetes and other obesity related diseases which place the nation's health service under considerable strain. Much of this is related to the nation's cultural love of food and eating as well as the modern influx of cheap and high-fat content meat, with corned beef and lamb belly remaining firm favourites in Tongan cuisine. Despite being a highly obese population, there is little stigma attached to being overweight as one might find in many Western civilizations. Like a great number of South Pacific cultures, large bodies are often revered, though there is growing acknowledgment of the health risks involved.

== Clothing ==
Children dressed in their best for a church festival. The boys are wearing tupenu and ta'ovala.

Tongan men wear a tupenu, a cloth that is similar to a sarong, which is wrapped around the waist. It should be long enough to cover the knees or the shins of the legs. In daily life, any shirt (T-shirt, jersey, woven shirt) will do to top the tupenu. Usually shirts are used clothing imported from overseas. Some men will go shirtless working on their plantations, but by law they are not allowed to go shirtless in public.

On formal occasions a taʻovala, a woven mat, is worn over the tupenu. It is wrapped around the waist and secured with a kafa rope. The tupenu may be smartly tailored and have a matching suit jacket. If a man cannot afford to have a suit tailored to fit him, he will buy a used Western jacket, or wear a threadbare jacket inherited from an older relative.

Women too wear a tupenu, but a long one which should reach to the ankles. They sometimes wear a shorter tupenu for working in the house or picking shellfish on the reef. The tupenu is usually topped with a kofu, or dress. This may be sewn to order, or it may be an imported used dress. Sometimes women wear blouses or jerseys.

On formal occasions women too wear a taʻovala, or more often a kiekie, a string skirt attached to a waistband. It is lighter and cooler than a mat. Kiekie are made from many different materials, from the traditional (pandanus leaves, as used in mats) to the innovative (unspooled magnetic tape from tape cassettes).

Huge taʻovala are worn at funerals.

The largest Methodist church holds a yearly celebration for the women of the congregation. Churches hold special church services to which women wear white clothing. All the Methodist churches have adopted the Western custom of women wearing hats to church. Only women who have been admitted to the congregation can wear hats; those denied admittance (because they are still young, or because they are considered to be living immoral lives) are only "inquirers" and go hatless.

More and more Tongan men are abandoning the traditional tupenu for trousers, at least when it comes to working in the fields. Women can be innovative in terms of color and cut within the context of the traditional kofu/tupenu combination.

== Sports ==
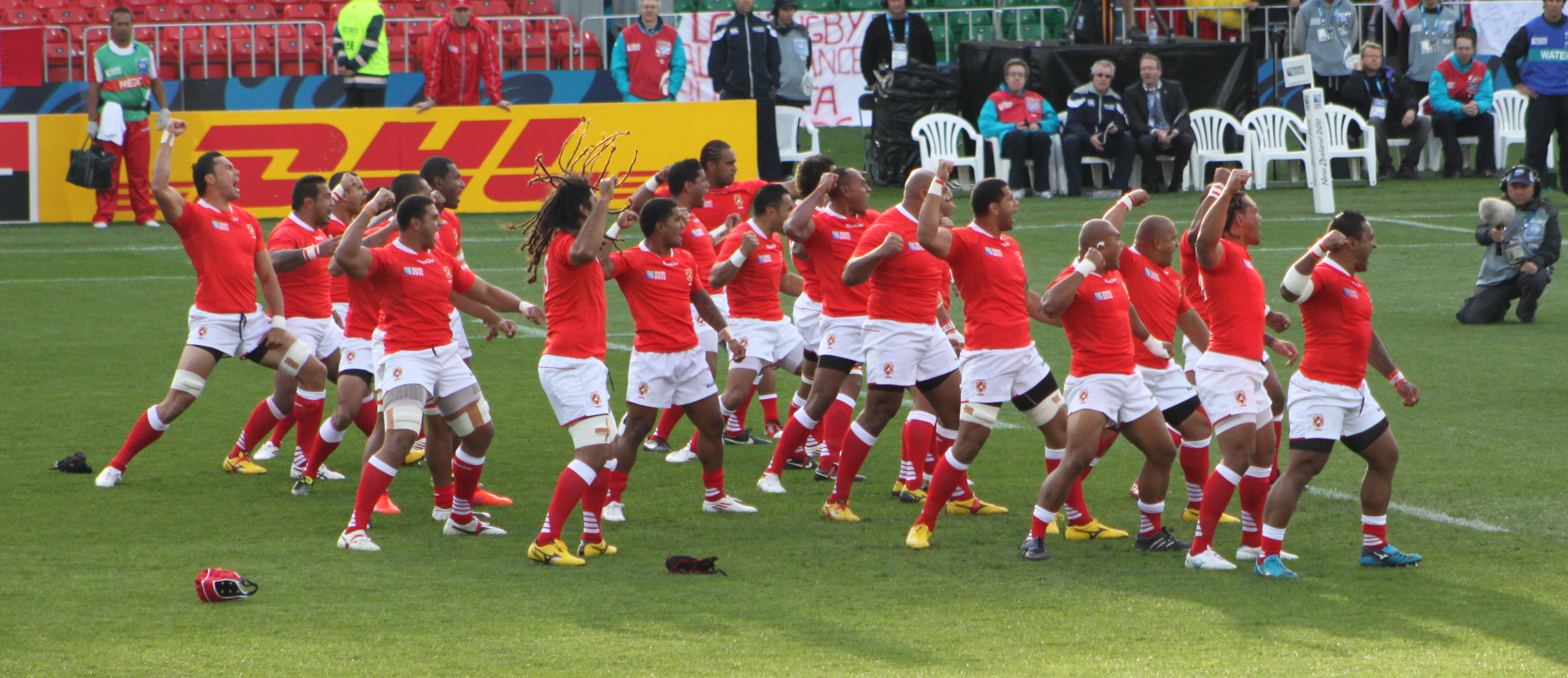
France vs. Tonga at the 2011 Rugby World Cup.

Rugby union is the national sport in Tonga. The nation has a national rugby union team, which played in the 1987, 1995, 1999, 2003, 2007 Rugby World Cup and the 2015 competitions. Though Tongans are passionate rugby followers, the small population base means that internationally, Tongan rugby continually struggles. Often, young talent emigrate to countries which offer greater prospects of individual success such as New Zealand and Australia. Some notable rugby union players of Tongan descent include Jonah Lomu (played for the All Blacks) and Toutai Kefu (plays for Australian Wallaby).

Rugby league is a popular sport enjoyed by Tongans. Football has a following, while judo, surfing, volleyball, and cricket have gained popularity in recent years.

== Religion ==
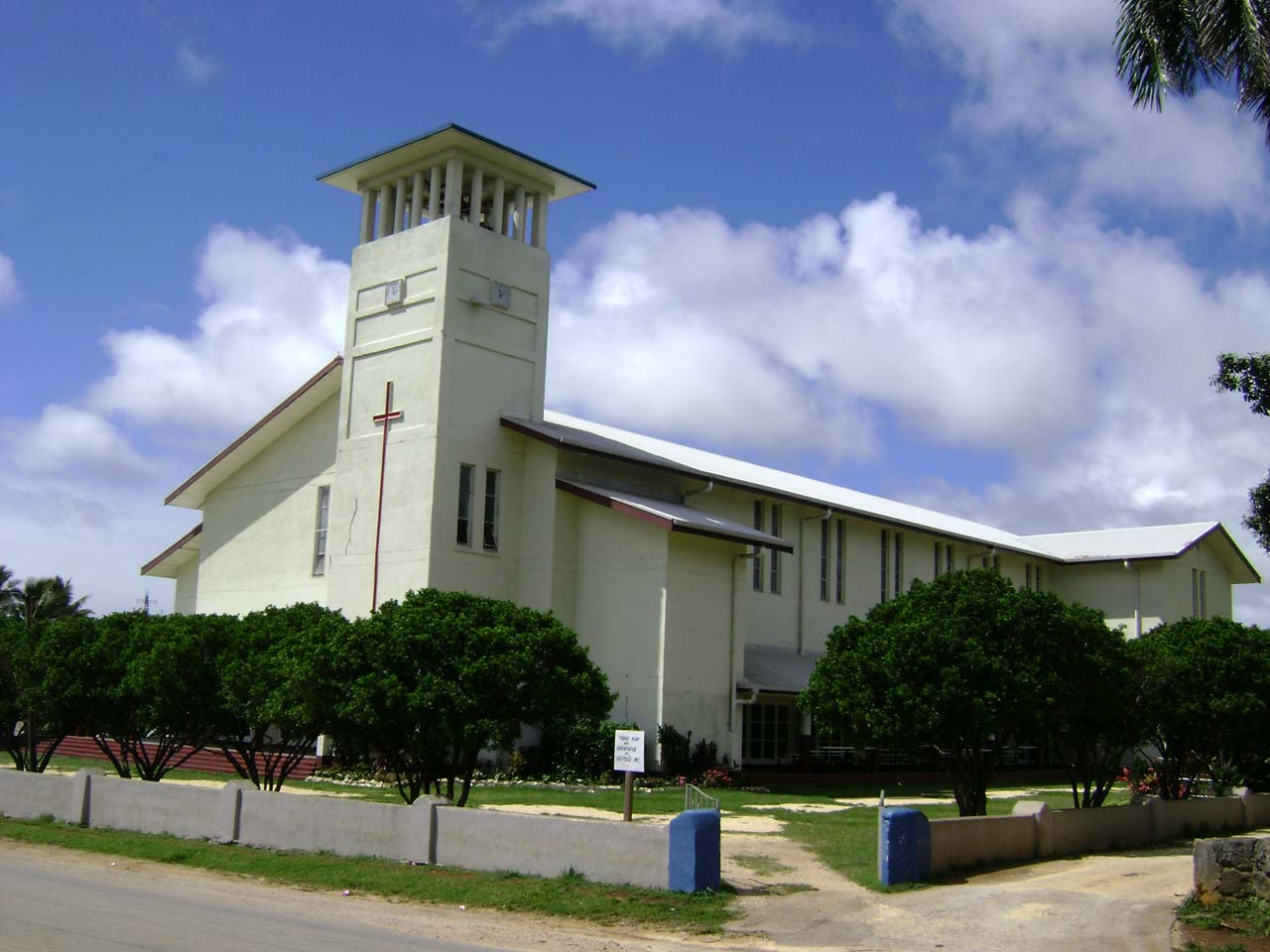
A church in Kolomotu'a, Tonga.

The king and the majority of the royal family are members of the Free Wesleyan Church (Methodist) which claims some 35,000 adherents in the country. There are four other Methodist denominations in the country, as well as a number of (much smaller) Pentecostal and Evangelicalist congregations. Roman Catholic Church and each have a strong presence in the country as well. There is a small Seventh-day Adventist Church group, an Anglican church, and a few adherents of the Bahá'í Faith in Tonga. There are even some Tongan Muslims.

The second largest religious group is the Church of Jesus Christ of Latter-day Saints, which has over 18,000 followers.

Tongans are ardent churchgoers. Methodist services usually follow a call and response structure. Singing in the church is often done a cappella. Although church attends primarily to the spiritual needs of the population, it also functions as the primary social hub. As consequence people who go to a church of another denomination are absolutely not shunned.

Sunday in Tonga is celebrated as a day for rest and worship; strict Sabbatarianism is enshrined in the constitution. No trade is allowed on Sunday, except essential services, after special approval by the minister of police. Lawbreakers risk a fine or imprisonment.

== Public holidays ==
The Public Holidays Act declares the following days to be public holidays:

- New Year's Day (1 January)
- Good Friday
- Easter Monday
- Anzac Day (25 April)
- Emancipation Day (4 June)
- King Tupou VI Day (4 July)
- Crown Prince's Birthday (17 September)
- Constitution Day (4 November)
- King Tupou I Day (4 December)
- Christmas Day (25 December)
- Boxing Day (26 December)

Most public holidays are Mondayised, and celebrated on the preceding or next-following Monday.

=== Festivals ===
Popular Tongan festivals included (new scheme still to be established since the change of public holidays):

- Heilala Festival Week (around 8 July)
- Vavaʻu Festival Week (around 8 May)
- Haʻapai Tourism Festival (around 8 June)
- Royal Agricultural and Industrial Show (triennial, August–September)
- ʻEua Tourism Festival (around 8 May)

== See also ==
- List of museums in Tonga
- Outline of Tonga
- Demographics of Tonga
- Makafeke
