= Caloptilia iselaea =

Scientific classification
- Kingdom: Animalia
- Phylum: Arthropoda
- Class: Insecta
- Order: Lepidoptera
- Family: Gracillariidae
- Genus: Caloptilia
- Species: C. iselaea

Binomial name
- Caloptilia iselaea (Meyrick, 1914)

Synonyms
- Caloptilia hapalocharis (Meyrick, 1935)

Species of moth

Caloptilia iselaea is a moth of the family Gracillariidae. It is known from Brunei, the Cook Islands, Fiji, India, Indonesia (Java and Sulawesi), Malaysia (Pahang and Selangor), Sri Lanka and Thailand.

The larvae feed on Spondias cytherea, Spondias mangifera and Spondias pinnata. They mine the leaves of their host plant.
