= Telly Tuita =

Australian interdisciplinary artist

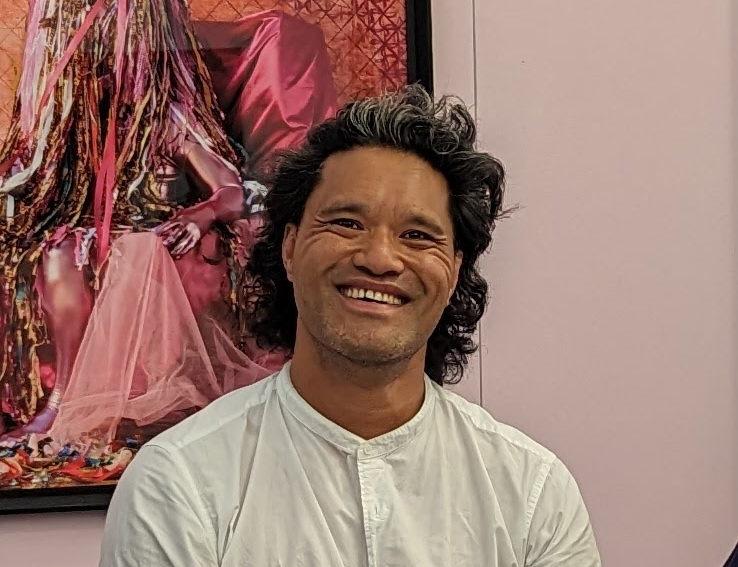
- Tuita in 2023
- Born: 1980 (age 45–46); Tonga
- Known for: interdisciplinary art
- Style: Tongpop (Tongan pop)
- Awards: 2020 – Molly Morpeth Canaday Award

Telly Bronson Tuita (born 1980, Tonga) is an Australian and New Zealand interdisciplinary artist of Tongan descent notable for receiving the 2020 Molly Morpeth Canaday award for the work Three Graces – U'ufoasini, Akale'a, Ta'alea creating. Later in 2021 becoming a finalist for the National Contemporary Art Award for work Diasporas Children Wellington. Also notable for the creator of the fictional word 'Tongpop' defined as a combination of Tuita's adoration for dazzling, distinct hues and traditional 'Tongan ngatu patterns and religious iconography.'

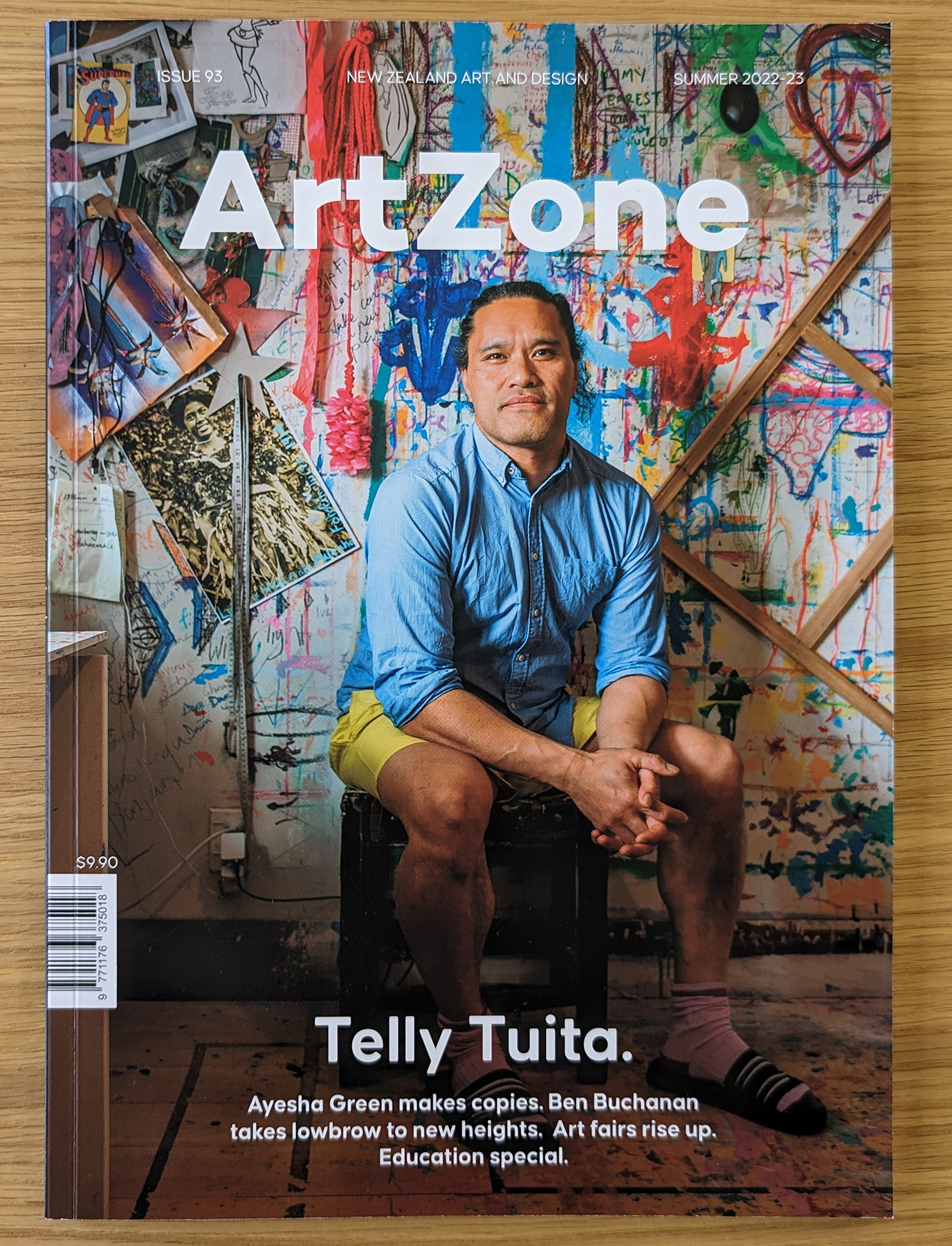
Telly Tuita on Artzone, Summer 2022-23

== Biography ==
Telly Tuita was born in 1980 in Tonga. At age nine, he migrated to Sydney, Australia, living in Australia for most of his life, now currently located in Wellington New Zealand. 1999–2003 Tuita studied and completed a Bachelor of Fine Art at Western Sydney University before going to the University of New South Wales to pursue a Bachelor of Art Education in 2004. Later in 2011, he completed a Master's in Special Education with the University of Sydney. Tuita worked at Green Square School primary school and community centre from 2015 to 2017 as a High School art teacher, a Special Education teacher, and an Assistant Principal.

Telly Tuita delves into his cultural identity through nostalgia, which is shaped by his childhood relocation from Tonga. Tuita developed Tongpop, a distinct visual language, as a result of his exploration of his ethnic identity and complex relationship with his ancestral land.

After the destructive Tonga tsunami in 2022 New Zealand based Tongan artists established an online art project named Peau Kula, to fundraise. Tuita along with other artists such as Sione Monū and Dagmar Dyck donated works to this cause. Peau Kula is a Tongan name that refers to the ferocity and power of a wave as expressed in red, also acknowledging Tongan enriched history with volcanic eruptions and the experience of the Peau kula.

Tuita's Inaugural solo exhibition Tongpop Nostalgia was a pivotal point in his career. Tuita ran a crowd funding campaign to allow the work to be presented in Ōtautahi.

In 2021, Tuita’s work Diasporas Children was part of a Wellington City Council the Creative Hoardings pilot programme. Creative Hoardings have been developed in response to a growing number of construction sites around Wellington. Hoardings consist of plywood panels and simple framing structures and surround construction sites as temporary safety walls.

In 2024, Tuita returned to Campbelltown to have a solo exhibition where he grew up, called Tongpop's Great Expectations in Campbelltown Arts Centre. 2024 also saw Tuita holding a solo exhibition Tongpop Archetypes in New Zealand Portrait Gallery, and The Tēvolo Made Me Do It in Bergman Gallery.

2025 saw Tuita take over Walsh Bay Arts Precinct as Sydney Festival's Visual Artist in Residence. The Sydney Festival's major work is a 1920s steamship, the SS John Oxley, which was adorned with a massive ta'ovala manafau (dance skirt) and kiekie (Tongan dress) while it docks in the Walsh Bay in Sydney.

== Awards ==
- 2021 – Finalist for the 2021 National Contemporary Art Award for work Diasporas Children, Waikato Museum.
- 2020 – Molly Morpeth Canaday Award (Arts Whakatāne Highly Commended Award.)
- 2019 – Wintec Merit Award, Wintec.

== Residencies ==
- 2025 – Sydney Festival’s Visual Artist in Residence, Sydney, Australia
- 2023 – Poison Creek Sculpture Project Artist Residency, Wellington, New Zealand.

== Selected solo exhibitions ==
- 2025 – Tongpop Fervour, Bergman Gallery, Rarotonga, Cook Islands
- 2025 – The Tā and Vā of Tongpop, The Thirsty Mile, Sydney Festival, Sydney, Australia
- 2024 – The Tēvolo Made Me Do It, Bergman Gallery, Auckland, New Zealand
- 2024 – Tongpop Archetypes, New Zealand Portrait Gallery, Wellington, New Zealand
- 2024 – Tongpop's Great Expectations, Campbelltown Arts Centre, Campbelltown, Australia
- 2023 – Tongpop Pantheon, Core Program Outdoor - Australian Premiere, Ballarat International Foto Biennale, Ballarat, Victoria, Australia
- 2023 – Tongpop to Britomart, Britomart Precinct, Auckland, New Zealand
- 2023 – The Immortal Tango Of Love And War, Bergman Gallery, Aotearoa Art Fair, Auckland, New Zealand
- 2022 – Tongpop Cornucopia. Bergman Gallery, Auckland, New Zealand
- 2020 – Tongpop He-Story, Precinct35, Kaukau, Wellington, New Zealand
- 2020 – Tongpop Nostalgia. CoCA – Centre of Contemporary Art Toi Moroki, Christchurch, New Zealand
- 2020 – TongPop Herstory. Weasel Gallery, Hamilton, New Zealand
- 2020 – Tongpop Fetish. Objectspace, Auckland, New Zealand
- 2018 – Tongpop Souvenir, Precinct35, Wellington, New Zealand

== Selected group exhibitions ==
- 2025 – Sydney Contemporary, Carriageworks, Mars Gallery, Sydney, Australia
- 2025 – Aotearoa Art Fair, Bergman Gallery, Viaduct Events Centre, Auckland, New Zealand
- 2025 – Horny Jail II, Nasha Gallery, Sydney, Australia
- 2024 – Aotearoa Art Fair, Bergman Gallery, Viaduct Events Centre, Auckland, New Zealand
- 2024 – Fa’aaliga – Beneath the Surface, Bergman Gallery, Auckland, New Zealand
- 2023 – Horizon, Bergman Gallery, Auckland, New Zealand
- 2023 – Tukufakaholo - Tongan Contemporary. Bergman Gallery, Auckland, New Zealand
- 2022 – Aotearoa Art Fair, Bergman Gallery, The Cloud, Auckland, New Zealand
- 2022 – Te Atuitanga Beneath Our Cloak of Stars. Bergman Gallery, Auckland, New Zealand
- 2022 – Whetūrangitia/Made As Stars. The Dowse Art Museum, Wellington, New Zealand
- 2021 – Mānawatia Takatāpui / Defending Plurality, Tauranga Art Gallery, Tauranga, New Zealand
- 2020–2021 – SALTWATER/Interconnectivity. TAUTAI, Auckland, New Zealand
