= Xocotl =

Nahuatl-language classification for sour or acidic fruit

Xocotl is the generic Nahuatl language classification for sour or acidic fruit, used in the names of many species of fruit tree including atoya-xocotl (flowing stream plum), maza-xocotl (deer plum), atoya-xocotl (large plum ciruela) te-xocotl (yellow or red hawberries), xal-xocotl (sand plum or guava), and coua-xocotl (serpent fruit), but also used in particular for jocote (Spondias purpurea).
