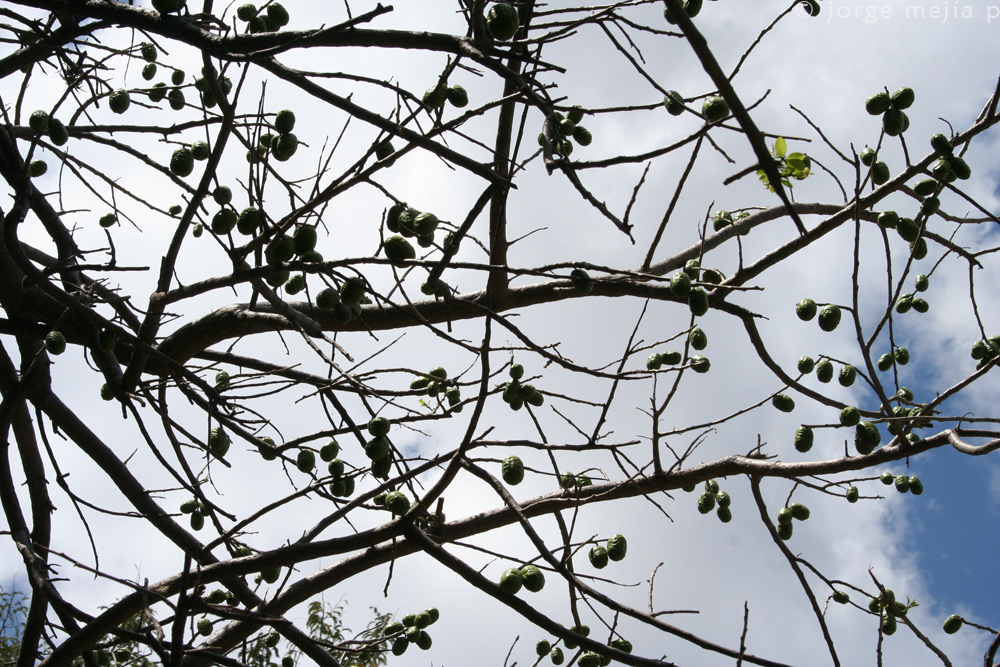

Conservation status
- Least Concern (IUCN 3.1)

Scientific classification
- Kingdom: Plantae
- Clade: Tracheophytes
- Clade: Angiosperms
- Clade: Eudicots
- Clade: Rosids
- Order: Sapindales
- Family: Anacardiaceae
- Genus: Spondias
- Species: S. purpurea

Binomial name
- Spondias purpurea L.

= Spondias purpurea =

Species of plant

Spondias purpurea is a species of flowering plant in the cashew family, Anacardiaceae, that is native to tropical regions of the Americas, from Mexico to northern Colombia and the southwest Caribbean Islands. It has also been introduced to and naturalized to other parts of the American tropics, Southeast Asia, and West Africa. It is commonly known as jocote (/həˈkoʊ.tiː, -teɪ/), which derives from the Nahuatl word xocotl, meaning any kind of sour or acidic fruit. Other common names include red mombin, Spanish plum, purple mombin, Jamaica plum, and hog plum.

== Names ==
In countries where they are native, jocotes are also known more widely as jocote, ciruela, ciruelo, chiabal, cirgüela, or jobo (Mexico); ciruela calentana or ciruela huesito (Venezuela, Colombia); jocote tronador or sismoyo (Costa Rica); ciruela (Honduras); jocote comun (Nicaragua); ciruela or ciruela traqueadora (Panama); ciruela, ovo, ciriguela or jobito (Ecuador); and jocote, jobo, or pitarrillo (El Salvador). They were also introduced very early to the Philippines during the Spanish colonial era, where they are known as siniguelas, sineguelas, siriguelas, or sirhuelas (from Philippine Spanish ciruela or cirigüela).

Jocotes were also introduced to other parts of South America and the Caribbean, where they are known as ciroelo, ciriguela, ceriguela, seriguela, or siriguela, cirigüeleira, caya, ambu, imbu, or umbu (Brazil); ciruela campechana (Cuba); jobillo or jobo francés (Puerto Rico); ajuela ciruelo (Peru); cironelle (Haiti); and maka pruim (Aruba, Bonaire, and Curaçao).

== Distribution ==
Jocotes are native to the central tropical regions of the Americas. The countries where wild populations are found include Belize, Colombia, Costa Rica, El Salvador, Guatemala, Honduras, Jamaica, Mexico, Nicaragua, and Panama.

They have been introduced and naturalized elsewhere in the Americas, including the Bahamas, Bolivia, Brazil, Cayman Islands, Cuba, Dominican Republic, Florida, French Guiana, Guyana, Haiti, Leeward Islands, Peru, Puerto Rico, Trinidad and Tobago, Venezuela, and the Windward Islands. They were introduced to Tropical Asia via the Philippines, including Java (Indonesia) and Bangladesh. They have also been introduced to West Africa, in Gambia, Guinea-Bissau, and Senegal.

== Description ==
S. purpurea fruit grow on deciduous trees in warm tropical climates. They begin to develop following tiny red flowers, before any leaves appear on the tree. S. purpurea fruit grows along thick, knobby branches in clusters or alone. They are about 2 and a half to 5 centimeters in diameter and are slightly elongated. Some have a knob on the end, or are oddly shaped. Young S. purpurea fruit are green or yellowish-green and ripen to a purple or red color; some variants of the species will ripen to a yellow color.

The thin skin has a waxy appearance and is edible. The pulp is yellow when ripe and sweet. In the center of the fruit is a large pit, or stone, which is inedible. The flavor of a S. purpurea fruit is said to be similar to a plum, sweet with a bit of an acidic aftertaste. S. purpurea fruit is available in the fall and winter months. S. purpurea fruit are rich in vitamin C and carbohydrates. They are a source of calcium, phosphorus, iron and a small amount of fiber. They contain carotene, B-complex vitamins, and several important amino acids. S. purpurea are high in antioxidants, which help rid the body of free radicals.

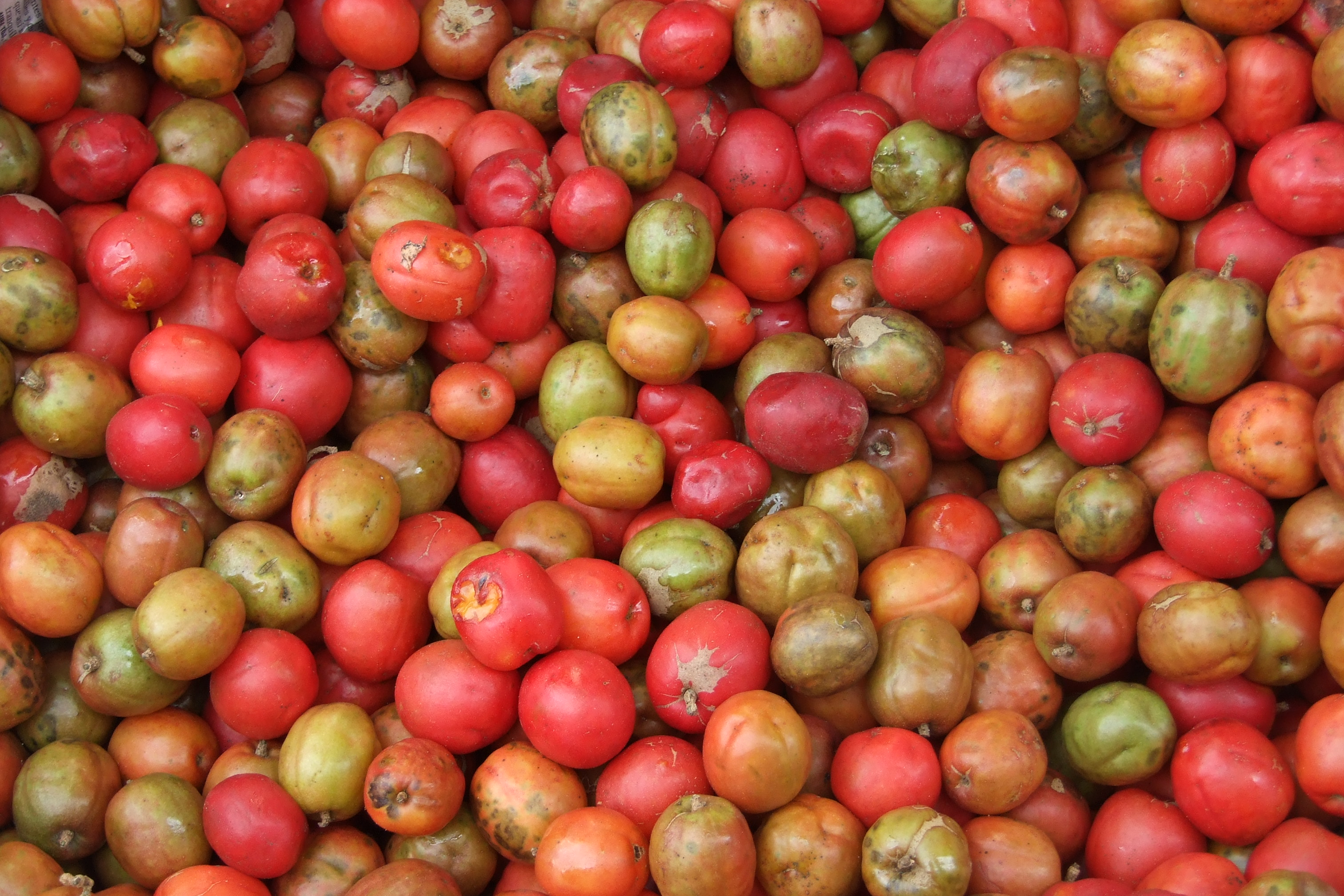
Fruits of Spondias purpurea

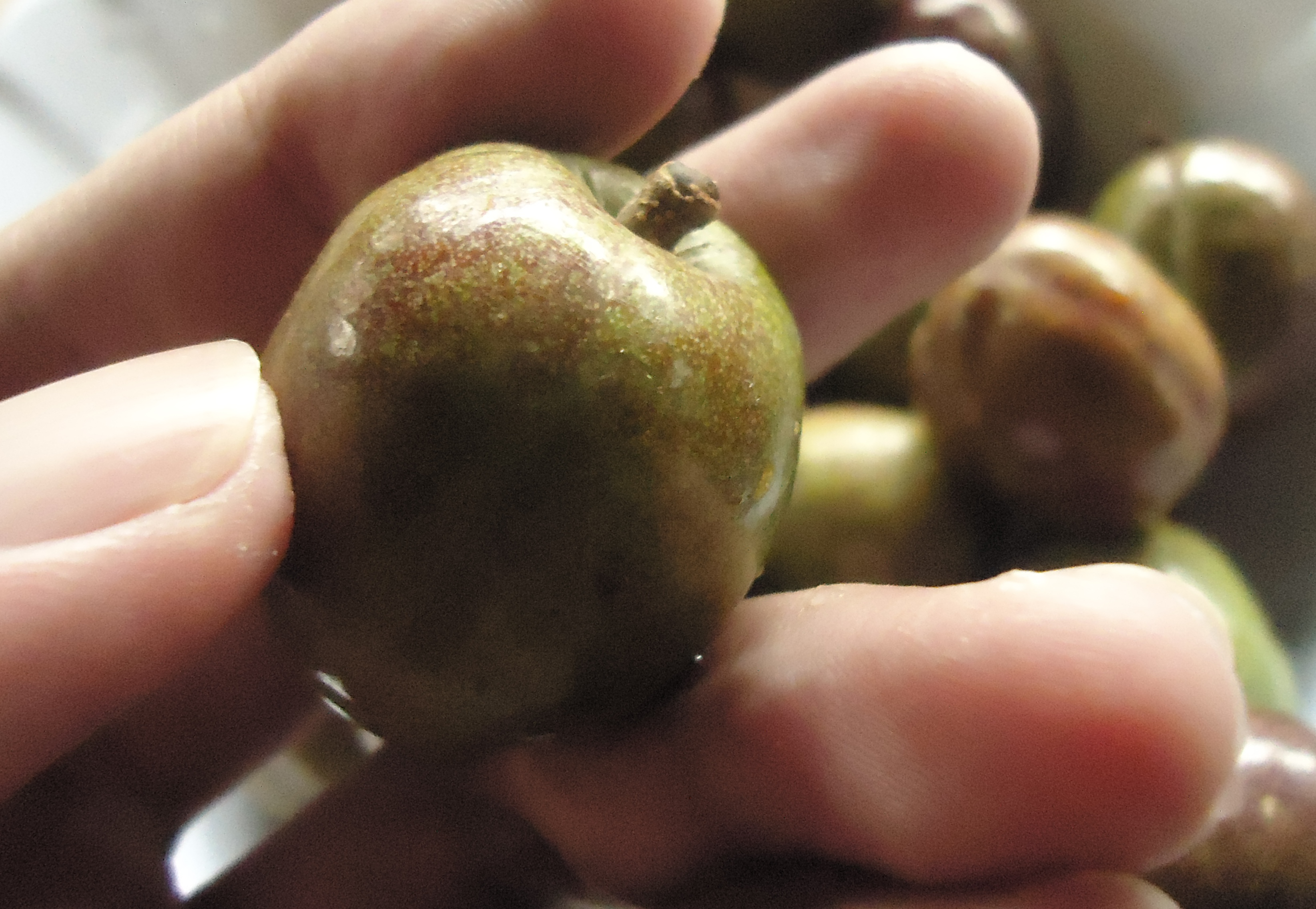
Spondias purpurea from the Philippines, where they are known as siniguelas

Urushiol is present in the sap of the tree and in small concentrations of the fruit peel; this can trigger contact dermatitis in sensitized individuals. This reaction is more likely to occur in people who have not been exposed to other plants from the family Anacardiaceae, such as poison oak and poison ivy, which are widespread in the United States.

In Florida growth is relegated to near-tropical areas of the state, and the tree is killed or greatly harmed by cold winter temperatures from Palm Beach County northward.

The fruit are most often enjoyed as-is, raw and fully ripe. Ripe fruits will be soft to the touch and are very sweet. They are eaten much like a plum or mango, with the pulp eaten and the stone discarded. The pulp can be used to make beverages, mashed and mixed with water and a sweetener. Whole fruits are boiled in water with sugar and sometimes other fruits to make a syrup or "honey". This is eaten with ice cream or alone as a dessert. The fruits are cooked whole to make preserves, the seeds strained from the liquid. Boiling and drying S. purpurea fruits will preserve them for several months. A typical jocote dish in Salvadoran cuisine consists of a syrup made of panela (a molasses made from artisan sugar blocks made by boiling cane juice from a molienda [cane crushing station traditionally run by oxen or currently with portable gas engines], to evaporate water until it achieves thick molasses consistency, then poured into wood molds and let it cool down. Once solidified later are wrapped in dry corn husk leaves called "tuzas" and sold in the markets. This can be found only during the harvest season, from around Semana Santa (Easter) to the end of August.

Unripe fruits can be eaten, though they are much more tart and somewhat bitter. In Costa Rica and Ecuador it is customary to eat the unripened fruit with salt. They are also made into a tart sauce or pickled in vinegar or lime juice and eaten with chile peppers and salt. The ripe and unripe fruit is commonly sold in the streets in most Central American countries in plastic bags; also available are red hot pepper sauce and "alhuaishte" (very fine ground toasted pumpkin seeds).

In Costa Rica, Panama and Coastal Ecuador the tree is used throughout the countryside as a living fence and can be propagated by planting trunks.

== History ==
Jocote trees have been used by the people of Mexico and Central America (Mesoamerica) for thousands of years, for both food and medicinal uses. The trees are also used to create living fences and to help stop soil erosion. A sap or gum from the tree is used as a glue and the same material is combined with sapote or pineapple to make a treatment for jaundice.

Jocote trees are native to the area that stretches from southern Mexico to northern Peru and parts of north-coastal Brazil. They are most common in Mexico and Central America, though they can be found growing throughout the West Indies as well. Spanish explorers brought jocote fruit to the Philippines, where it is popular. Jocote trees have been spotted growing in Florida, though they are not cultivated and are likely planted as a curiosity. Jocotes can be found in specialty stores catering to Central American cuisine and products.

Since 2011, jocote has been cultivated in Chiapas, Mexico, providing much needed work for producers in the area, and a good tree for planting in areas affected by soil erosion. Jocote fruit is also known as Purple Mombin, Jamaica Plum, Ciruela (Spanish for "plum"), or Hog Plum. There are many different varieties of jocote fruit, up to 50 recorded in Nicaragua. There is a high variability among the fruits and in their color and appearance. Jocotes are related to mangoes and to cashew apples, from which we get cashew nuts.

Due to a reduction in the acreage of the tropical dry forests in Mesoamerica, native populations of the wild ancestor of S. purpurea have declined. Cultivation of this species in traditional agricultural habitats such as gardens and fences appears to have preserved several haplotypes of this species, that would otherwise have been extirpated.

== See also ==
- Spondias pinnata, similar species native to the Philippines and Indonesia
- Spondias dulcis, similar species native to Melanesia and Polynesia
