= Sione Monū =

- Born: Sione Tuívailala Monū; 1993 (age 32–33); Tāmaki Makaurau (Auckland), Aotearoa New Zealand
- Known for: interdisciplinary art
- Style: beads and flowers, video

Sione Tuívailala Monū (born 1993 Auckland, New Zealand) is an Australian and New Zealand interdisciplinary artist of Tongan descent notable for their use of beads and flowers.

== Biography ==
Monū grew up around Australia, as their father's job was in the Australian Defence Force. Their mother is an avid collector of Tongan crafts, adornments and ngatu (bark cloth). Their family's ancestral village is Kanokupolu, on the main island of Tongatapu. As a child, Monū enjoyed experimenting with materials, "Flowers as a material and symbol have always been something I’ve responded to since I was a child." Monū was not taught how to make Tongan crafts in a traditional way, so they developed their own interpretations with materials they had at hand.

Monū was previously a member of FAFSWAG, a South Auckland-based queer Pacific arts collective, participating in several of its exhibitions between 2016 and 2017, including Making Space at the Centre of Contemporary Art Toi Moroki, Christchurch, and Statuesque Anarchy at Enjoy Public Art Gallery, Wellington.

Monū lives between Canberra, Australia and Auckland, New Zealand, and works across the different mediums of photography, moving-image, fashion and adornment, performance and drawing exploring identity, family and Pacific peoples' queer experience in the diaspora.

Their 2020 audiovisual work Only Yesterday depicts both themselves and artist Manuha'apai Vaeatangitau as 'ultimate leitī' in a utopian reality, using crystals and beads as currency.

Monū's photographic series Kafu Couture (2014–present) showcases household mink blankets, or kafu, worn as couture fashion pieces shot in an editorial style.

Monū has shown their work in many art galleries throughout New Zealand and Australia, including Perth Institute of Contemporary Arts, Auckland Art Gallery, Christchurch Art Gallery, Māngere Art Centre, and Bergman Gallery

== Awards ==
In 2024, Monū received the Emerging Pacific Artist Award at the Arts Pasifika Awards, an annual ceremony hosted by Creative New Zealand and held that year at Parliament in Wellington.

== Selected solo exhibitions ==
- 2023 – The Way We Were, Robert Heald Gallery, Wellington, New Zealand
- 2023 – Stories, City Gallery Wellington, Wellington, New Zealand
- 2022 – Matariki Fetu’u, Kaukau, Wellington, New Zealand
- 2022 – Volver, Robert Heald Gallery, Wellington, New Zealand
- 2022 – Kindred: A Leitī Chronicle (with Manu Vaeatangitau), Auckland Art Gallery, Auckland, New Zealand
- 2021 – ’Ao Kakala Ōtautahi, SCAPE Public Art Season 2021, Christchurch, New Zealand
- 2021 – Leitī, Perth Institute of Contemporary Arts, Perth, Australia
- 2020 – Kahoa Kakala, Objectspace, Auckland, New Zealand
- 2020 – Speaking Surfaces, ST PAUL St Gallery, Auckland, New Zealand
- 2019 – More than all the oceans between us, Artspace, Sydney, Australia
- 2017 – Kahoa Kakala, Fresh Gallery Ōtara, Auckland, New Zealand

== Selected group exhibitions ==
- 2023 – Tukufakaholo - Tongan Contemporary. Bergman Gallery, Auckland, New Zealand
- 2023 – Queer Encounters, Gallery of New South Wales, Sydney, Australia
- 2023 – Pride and Prejudice… Part1, Bergman Gallery, Auckland, New Zealand
- 2023 – Oasis/respite, Studio One Toi Tū, Auckland, New Zealand
- 2022 – Declaration: A Pacific Feminist Agenda, Auckland Art Gallery, Auckland, New Zealand
- 2022 – Twisting, turning, winding: takatāpui + queer objects, Objectspace, Auckland, New Zealand
- 2022 – Kindred: A Leitī Chronicle, Māngere Art Centre, Auckland, New Zealand
- 2020 – Te Wheke: Pathways Across Oceania 2020, Christchurch Art Gallery, Christchurch, New Zealand
- 2016 – Social Matter, Blue Oyster, Dunedin, New Zealand
