= Makafeke =

Tongan octopus snare

A makafeke is a Tongan octopus snare which consists of a shell lashed to a line. The word is derived from the Tongan words maka ("stone" or "rock") and feke ("octopus").
