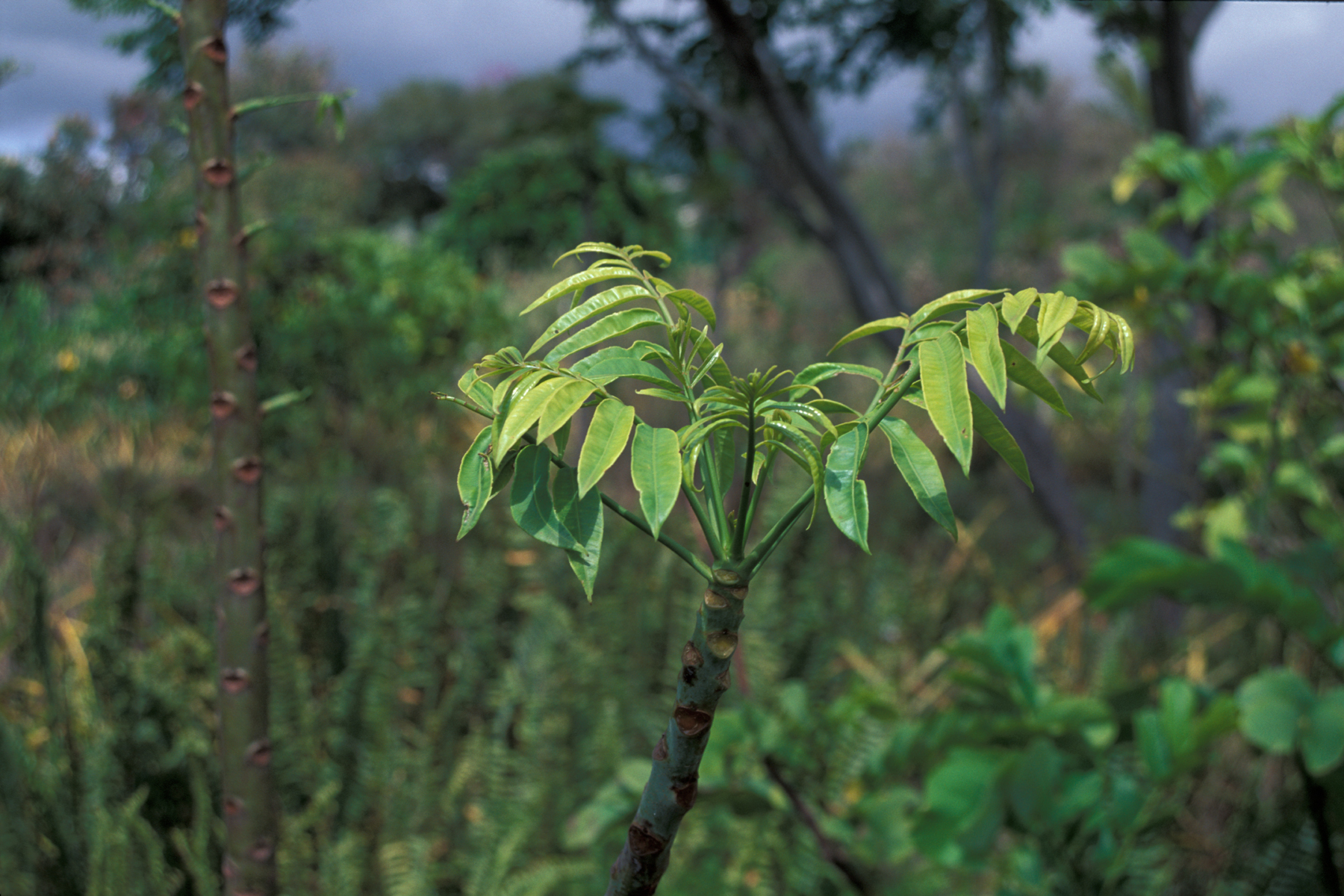

Scientific classification
- Kingdom: Plantae
- Clade: Embryophytes
- Clade: Tracheophytes
- Clade: Angiosperms
- Clade: Eudicots
- Clade: Rosids
- Order: Sapindales
- Family: Anacardiaceae
- Genus: Spondias
- Species: S. dulcis

Binomial name
- Spondias dulcis L.

= Spondias dulcis =

Species of tree

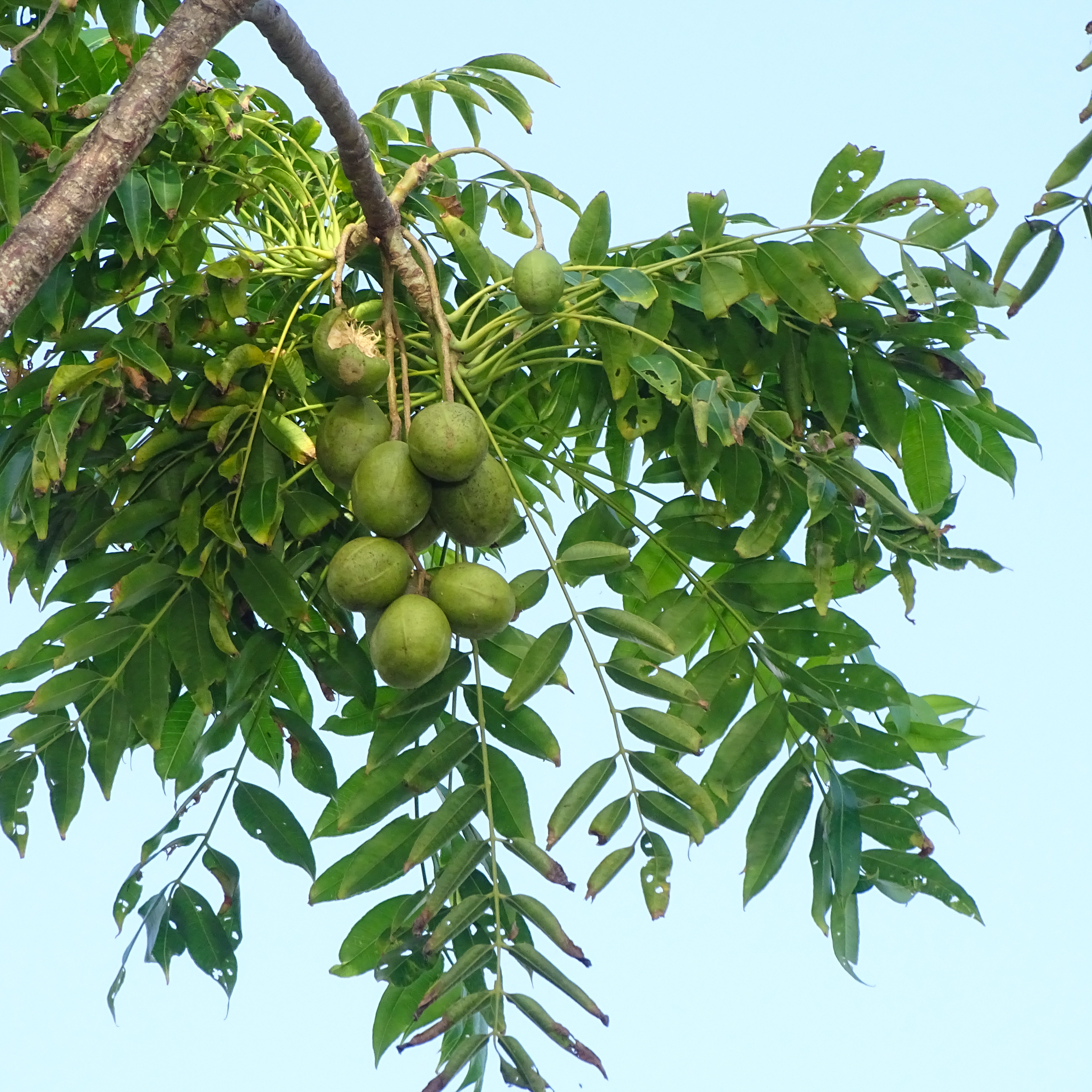
Spondias dulcis with fruit

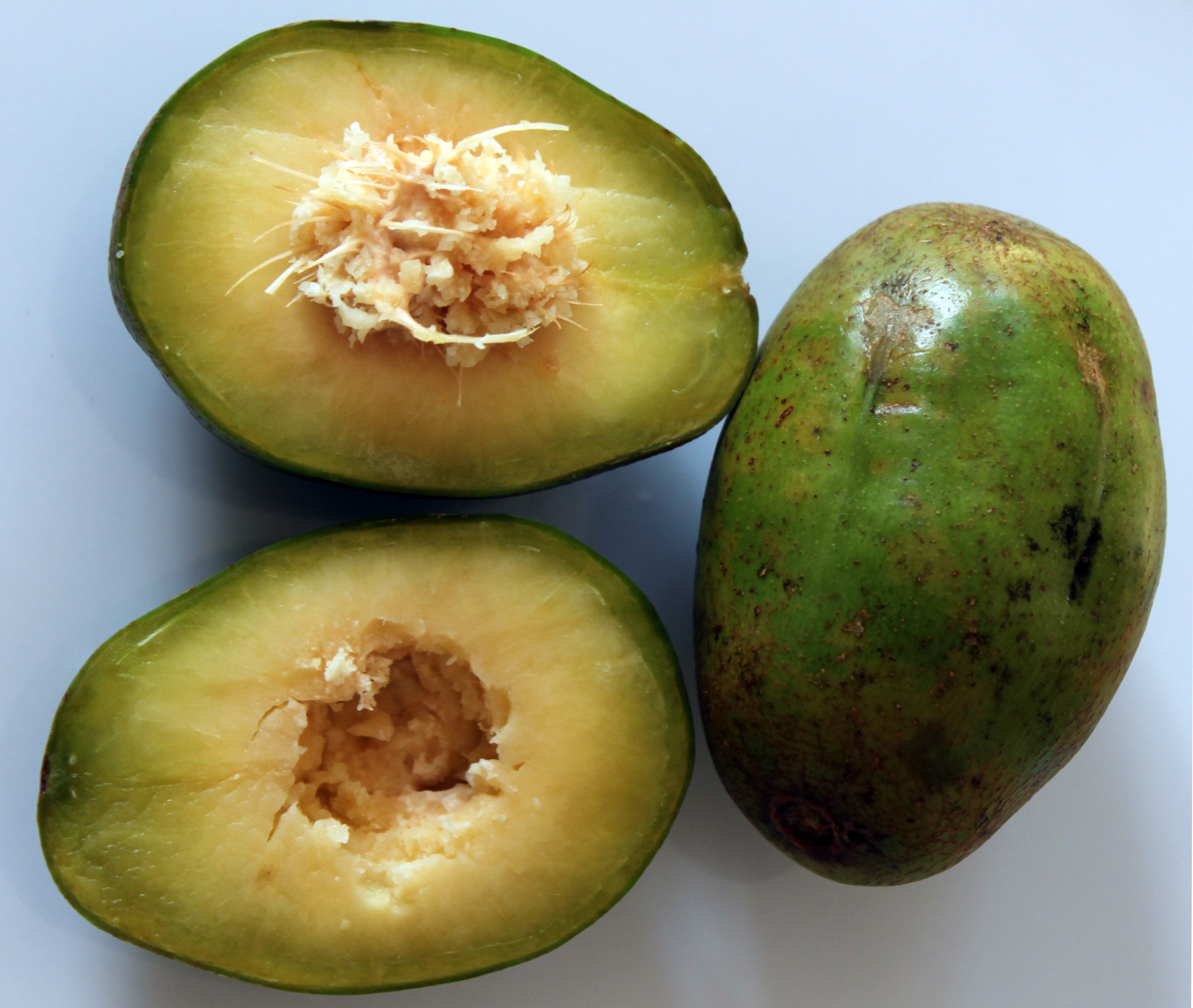
Unripe fruit

Spondias dulcis (syn. Spondias cytherea), known commonly as Polynesian plum or Tahiti apple, is a tropical fruit tree native to Melanesia, with edible fruit containing a fibrous pit.

The tree was spread to neighboring regions as canoe plants in Island Southeast Asia and Polynesia in prehistoric times by seafaring Austronesians during the Austronesian expansion. It remains widely cultivated in Polynesia, where it is generally known under the names vī or wī, and variants thereof.

It has also been introduced to other areas of the world in colonial times. In the English-speaking Caribbean it is typically known as golden apple and elsewhere in the Caribbean as pommecythere, April plum or June plum, Jew plum, ambarella or cythere.

== Description ==
This fast-growing tree can reach up to 20 m (66 ft) in its native range of Southeast Asia, Melanesia and Polynesia; however, it usually averages 10–12 m (30–40 ft) in other areas. Spondias dulcis has deciduous, pinnate leaves, 20–60 cm (8–24 in) in length, composed of 9 to 25 glossy, elliptic or obovate-oblong leaflets 9–10 cm (3.5–3.9 in) long, which are finely toothed toward the apex. The tree produces small, inconspicuous white flowers in terminal panicles. Its oval fruits, 6–9 cm (2.4–3.5 in) long, are borne in bunches of 12 or more on a long stalk. Over several weeks, the fruit fall to the ground while still green and hard, then turn golden-yellow as they ripen. According to Morton (1987), "some fruits in the South Sea Islands weigh over 500 g (1 lb) each."

Spondias dulcis can take 4–6 years from planting time to harvest, with a productive life of 20–30 years and almost all year round fruiting season. Propagation is primarily by cuttings or marcotting.

== Habitat ==
Spondias dulcis is native to the coastal areas of Melanesia and Southeast Asia, specifically modern day Indonesia and Malaysia, and has been introduced into tropical areas across the world. It was brought to Jamaica in 1782, and it is cultivated in Panama, Cuba, Haiti, the Dominican Republic, Puerto Rico, Suriname, Brazil, Costa Rica, Grenada, Trinidad and Tobago, Barbados, St. Lucia, and eastern Sucre in Venezuela. The United States Department of Agriculture received seeds from Liberia in 1909, but it did not become a popular crop in the US. Nevertheless, it is grown in South Florida as far north as Palm Beach County. The fruit is also widely grown in Somalia's agriculture belt, probably introduced during the colonial times preceding 1960.

== As food ==
Spondias dulcis is most commonly used as a food source. In West Java, its young leaves are used as seasoning for pepes. In Costa Rica, the more mature leaves are also eaten as a salad green though they are tart. However, it is most commonly used for its fruit.

The fruit may be eaten raw; the flesh is crunchy and a little sour. According to Boning (2006), "The fruit is best when fully colored, but still somewhat crunchy. At this stage, it has a pineapple-mango flavor. The flesh is golden in color, very juicy, vaguely sweet, but with a hint of tart acidity." In Indonesia and Malaysia, it is eaten with shrimp paste, a thick, black, salty-sweet sauce called hayko in the Southern Min dialect of Chinese. It is an ingredient in rujak in Indonesia and rojak in Malaysia. The juice is called kedondong in Indonesia, amra in Malaysia, balonglong in Singapore and gway thee in Myanmar.

The fruit is made into preserves and flavorings for sauces, soups, braised and stews. In Fiji it is made into jam, and its leaves are used to flavour meat. In Samoa and Tonga it is used to make otai. In Sri Lanka the fruit is soaked in vinegar with chili and other spices to make acharu. In Vietnam the unripe fruit is eaten with salt, sugar, and chili, or with shrimp paste. Children eat the fruit macerated in artificially sweetened licorice extract. In Jamaica, it is mostly considered a novelty, especially by children. It can be eaten with salt or made into a drink sweetened with sugar and spiced with ginger. In Barbados, the ripe fruit is eaten naturally, or sprinkled with a bit of salt, or dipped in the ocean's natural slightly salty water while at the beach. It is also used to make juice in Grenada and Saint Lucia. In Trinidad and Tobago, it is curried, sweetened, salted, or flavored with pepper sauce and spices. In Cambodia it is made into a salad called nhoam mkak (/ɲŏam məkaʔ/ ញាំម្កាក់). In Suriname and Guyana, the fruit is dried and made into a spicy chutney, mixed with garlic and peppers. In Thai cuisine both the fruits and the tender leaves are eaten.

== Vernacular names ==
(in alphabetical order)

- Aḍavi mamiḍi (అడవి మామిడి) — Telugu
- Āmbåḷā/āmbåṛā (ଆମ୍ବଳା/ଆମ୍ବଡ଼ା) - Odia
- Ambāḍe (ಅಂಬಾಡೆ) — Tulu
- Ambaḍo (अंबाडो) — Konkani
- Ambarella (ඇඹරැල්ලා) - Sinhala
- Ambarella or cythere — Dutch
- Ambazhangā (അമ്പഴങ്ങാ) — Malayalam
- Ambra — Malaysian, Indonesian and Sarawakian Malay
- Amokana — Hokkien
- Āmrā/biliṭi (আমড়া/বিলিটি) — Bengali
- Amrah (अमरा/امرا) — Caribbean Hindustani and Fiji Hindi
- Amarā (अमरा) — Nepali
- Āmṭe kāi (ಅಮಟೆ ಕಾಯ್) — Kannada
- Anbulha އަނބުޅަ — Dhivehi language
- Balolong — Cebuano language (Philippines)
- Buah long long — Singlish
- Cajá-manga — Brazil
- Casharana, taperibá — Peru
- Cas mango — Cameroon
- Chook-chook plum — Sierra Leone
- Ciruelo — Ecuador
- Cóc — Vietnamese
- Embe ng'ong'o or embe kizungu — Tanzania
- Evi — Réunion
- Frisiter — Mauritius, Seychelles
- Fruit de cythère — Mauritius
- Golden apple — Saint Kitts and Nevis, St Lucia, Barbados, Guyana, Saint Vincent and the Grenadines, Grenada
- Golden plum — Belize, Liberia
- Goldpflaume — German
- Green jungle/ Gidu (Milne Bay Province) — Papua New Guinea
- Gway — Burmese
- Heining (ꯍꯥꯌꯅꯤꯡ) – Meitei
- Hevi - Filipino
- Isbaandhays or isbaandhees — Somali
- Jobo indio — Spanish
- Jocote de mico — Guatemala
- June plum —The Bahamas, Jamaica, Bermuda
- Kedondong— Malaysian, Indonesian and Sarawakian Malay (also used for Spondias mangifera)
- Makok farang (มะกอกฝรั่ง) — Thai
- Manga zi nsende — Kikongo
- Mangotin — Panama
- Manzana de oro — Dominican Republic
- Mkak (ម្កាក់) — Khmer
- Naos — Bislaman
- Omora (অমৰা) — Assamese
- Pommisitair — Suriname
- Ponm sité, pomme cythère — Dominica
- Prune de cythère, pommecythere — French West Indies (Martinique, Guadeloupe), Guyane, Trinidad and Tobago
- Pulichcha kai (புலிச்சா காய்) — Tamil
- Sakoa — Malagasy
- Tamzinthai — Rongmei
- Titimar — Yapese (western Micronesia)
- Tsada – Hausa
- Umbra — Malaysia
- Vī — Samoan, Tongan, Niuean
- Vi kavakava — Cook Islands Maori
- Yuplón — Costa Rica
- Wi — Fijian, Hawaiian

== See also ==
- Spondias purpurea (jocote), similar species from the Americas
- Spondias pinnata, similar species native to the Philippines and Indonesia
- Spondias mombin, similar species native to the tropical Americas
