= 'otai =

Polynesian drink

ʻOtai
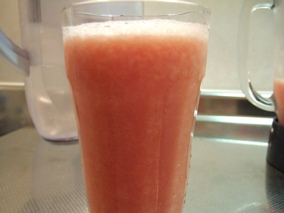
- A traditional serving of ʻOtai.
- Alternative names: Ōtai, Vai
- Type: Juice
- Course: Drink
- Place of origin: Polynesia
- Region or state: Niue, Samoa, Tokelau, Tonga, Tuvalu, Wallis and Futuna
- Serving temperature: Chilled
- Main ingredients: Coconut meat, Coconut milk, Coconut water, Tropical fruit
- Other information: Can be served in coconut shells in traditional settings.

ʻOtai (pronounced [ʔoʊˈtaɪ]) is a refreshing Polynesian beverage, typically made with coconut meat, coconut milk, and coconut water. It is most often associated with Tongan cuisine, though similar versions are enjoyed in other Polynesian islands, including Samoa, Niue, Tokelau, Tuvalu, Uvea, and Futuna.

History of ʻOtai

The drink has its origins in Western Polynesia, where it was traditionally served as a refreshing accompaniment to large meals. European colonists documented the Samoan version of ʻOtai in the late 19th century. The original recipe involved mixing grated ambarella fruit (known as vi in Samoan and Tongan and wi in Hawaiian) with young coconut meat, coconut milk, and coconut water. This mixture was poured into large coconut shells, corked with coconut husk, and chilled in cold water or waterfalls before serving.

Modern Variations

The modern Tongan version of ʻOtai is typically made with water, shredded coconut meat, and a variety of tropical fruits such as watermelon, mango and pineapple, with watermelon being the most commonly used fruit in the Tongan Islands. Sugar is often added to taste. Tongan historians note that this modern recipe is a departure from the traditional Polynesian version, as many ingredients—such as milk, refined sugar, and introduced fruits like watermelon, mango, and pineapple—were not native to Tonga.

The original Tongan recipe closely resembled the Samoan version, with the main difference being the choice of native fruit. While Samoa traditionally used ambarella (vi), Tonga used the mountain apple (fekika).

In Samoa, the distinction between native and introduced recipes remains important. In Samoa, ʻOtai refers specifically to the version made with vi fruit, while versions made with introduced fruits are referred to by their respective names: vai meleni (watermelon drink), vai mago (mango drink), and vai fala (pineapple drink).

Additionally, in some parts of the Pacific Islands, ʻOtai is considered a "health drink", especially in Samoa. The coconut water and natural enzymes from the fruits used in the drink are believed to aid digestion, making it not only a refreshing beverage but also a beneficial one for digestive health. This belief contributes to its enduring popularity in the region as both a cultural and health-conscious drink.

== See also ==
- List of juices
- Oceanian cuisine
