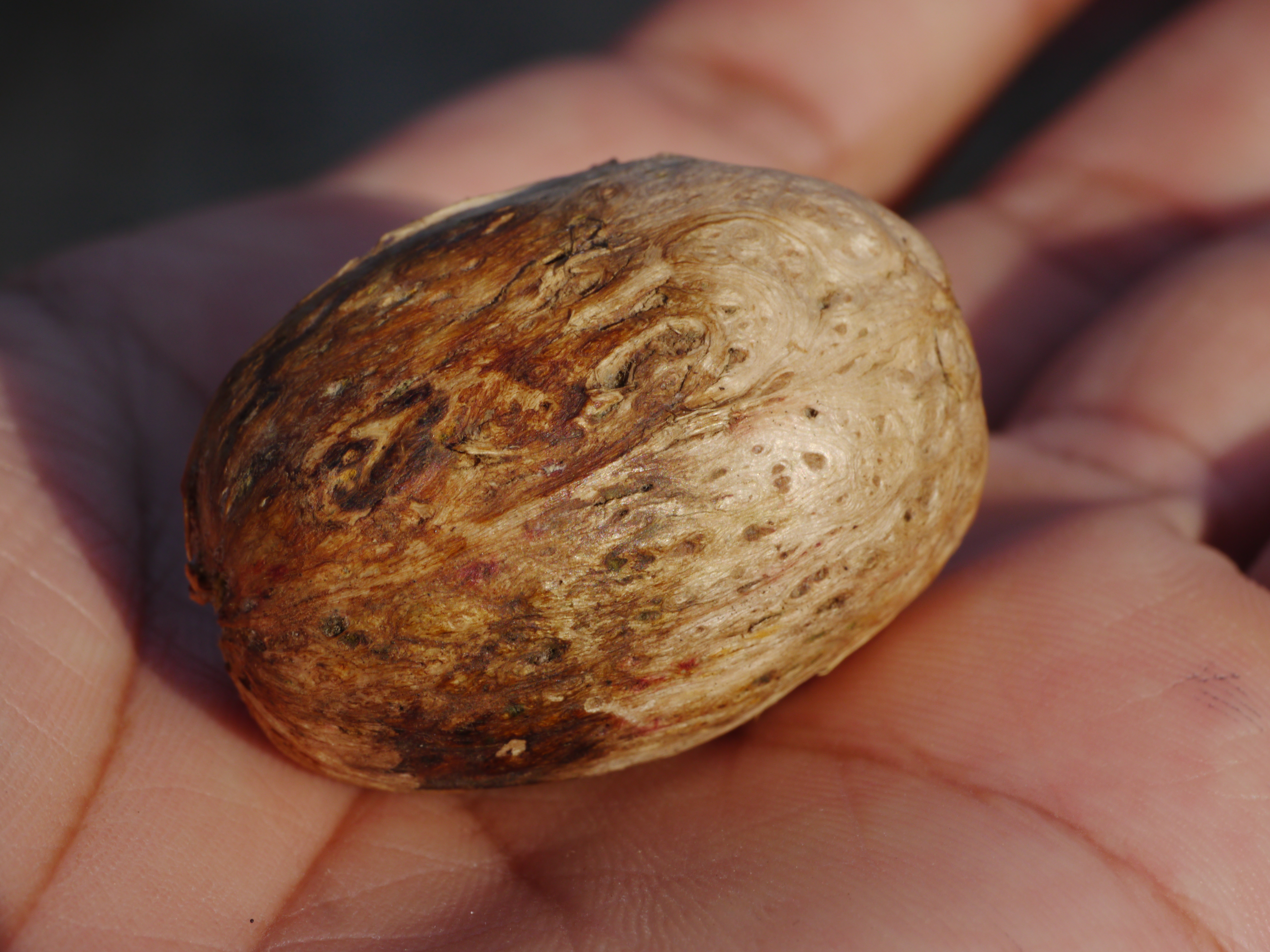

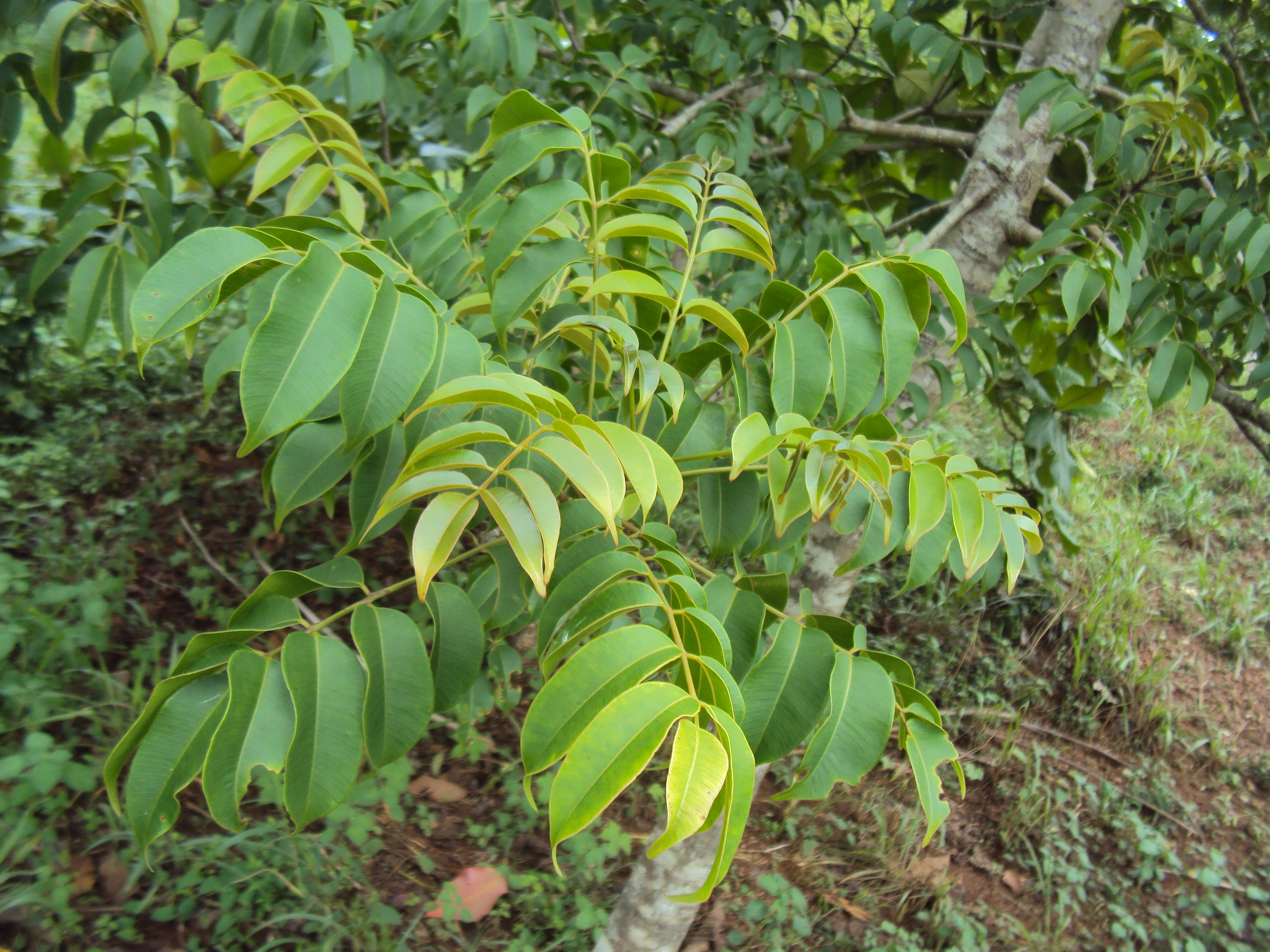
- Seed and leaves

Conservation status
- Least Concern (IUCN 3.1)

Scientific classification
- Kingdom: Plantae
- Clade: Embryophytes
- Clade: Tracheophytes
- Clade: Angiosperms
- Clade: Eudicots
- Clade: Rosids
- Order: Sapindales
- Family: Anacardiaceae
- Genus: Spondias
- Species: S. pinnata

Binomial name
- Spondias pinnata (L.f.) Kurz

Synonyms
- 13 synonyms: Buchanania yunnanensis C.Y.Wu; Evia amara Comm. ex Blume; Poupartia acuminata (Roxb.) Wall.; Spondias acuminata Roxb.; Spondias amara Lam.; Spondias bivenomarginalis K.M.Feng & P.I Mao; Spondias macrophylla Wall.; Spondias mangifera Willd.; Spondias mangifera var. javanica Koord. & Valeton; Spondias paniculata Roxb. ex Wight & Arn.; Spondias sinensis Lour. ex Steud.; Wirtgenia decandra Jungh.

= Spondias pinnata =

Species of tree

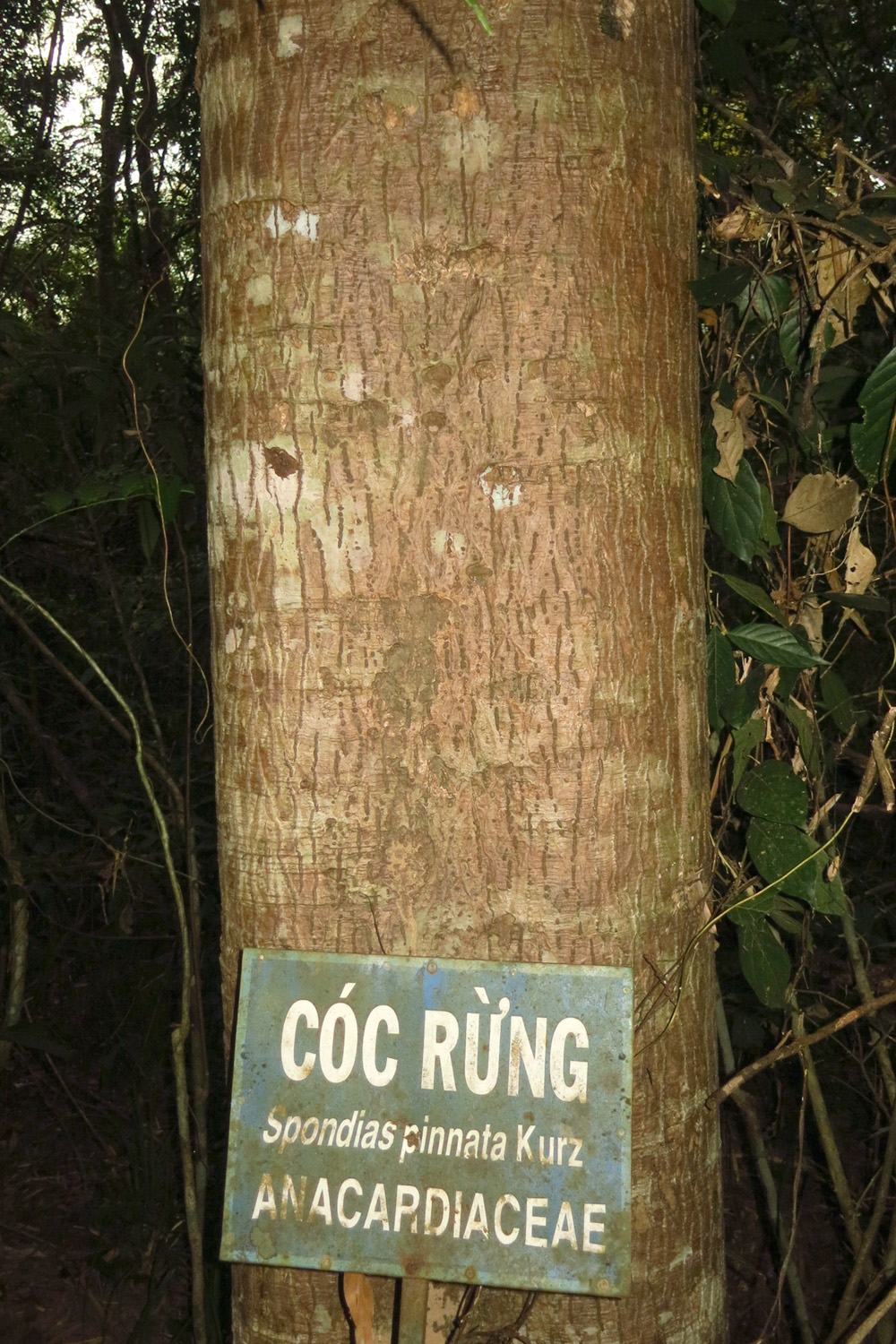
Trunk of specimen in Cat Tien National Park

Spondias pinnata, one of several plants called "hog plum", is a species of tree with edible sour fruits. It is native to the Philippines and Indonesia, but has been widely naturalized in South Asia, Mainland Southeast Asia, Southern China, and the Solomon Islands. It belongs to the family Anacardiaceae. This species, among several others, has sometimes been called the "wild (or forest) mango" in other languages and was once placed in the genus Mangifera. It is found in lowlands and hill forests up to 1,200 m (3,900 ft).

== Description ==
Spondias pinnata is a deciduous tree up to 25 m (82 ft) in height); branchlets yellowish brown and glabrous. The leaves are large, with pairs of leaflets (see illustration) on petioles that are 100–150 mm (3.9–5.9 in) and glabrous; leaf blades 300–400 mm (12–16 in), imparipinnately compound with 5-11 opposite leaflets; leaflet petiolule 3–5 mm (0.12–0.20 in); leaflet blade ovate-oblong to elliptic-oblong, 70–120 mm (2.8–4.7 in) × 40–50 mm (1.6–2.0 in), papery, glabrous on both sides, with margins that are serrate or entire; the apex is acuminate, lateral veins 12-25 pairs.

The inflorescence is paniculate, terminal, 250–350 mm (9.8–13.8 in) and glabrous, with basal first order branches 100–150 mm (3.9–5.9 in). The flowers are mostly sessile and small, white and glabrous; calyx lobes are triangular, approx. 0.5 mm (0.020 in). Petals are ovate-oblong, approximately 2.5 mm × 1.5 mm (0.098 in × 0.059 in); stamens are approximately 1.5 mm (0.059 in).

The fruit is a drupe ellipsoid to elliptic-ovoid, olive green becoming yellowish orange at maturity, 35–50 mm (1.4–2.0 in) × 25–35 mm (0.98–1.38 in); inner part of endocarp woody and grooved, outer part fibrous; mature fruit usually have 2 or 3 seeds. In China, it flowers from April–June and fruits from August–September.

== Vernacular names ==
Spondias pinnata may be called in:

- Burmese: ဝှေး (hwei or gwei)
- Chinese: 槟榔青, bing lang qing
- Tagalog: ᜎᜒᜊᜐ᜔, romanized: libas
- Cebuano (and other Visayan languages): alubihid or alubihod
- Khmer /pɷːn siː pʰlaɛ/ (ពោនស៊ីផ្លែ) or /məkaʔ prẹj/ (ម្កាក់ព្រៃ),
- Javanese (and Malay, Sundanese): kedondong (also for Spondias dulcis), kloncing
- Yapese and Palauan in Micronesia: titimer
- Vietnamese: cóc rừng ('forest ambarella')
- Balinese: kecemcem
- Lao: ຫມາກກອກ, muk-kog also written ໝາກກອກ, ໝາກກອກ(ສົ້ມ)
- Tamil: புலிச்சா காய் (pulichcha kāi, meaning "sour fruit"); in Sri Lanka it is also called amberella, although this more commonly refers to Spondias dulcis
- Thai: มะกอก, makok (eponym of the Thai capital Bangkok)
- Sanskrit: आम्रातकः (āmrātakaḥ)
- Tulu: ಅಂಬಾಡೆ (ambaḍe)
- Konkani: अंबडे (ambaḍe)
- Assamese language: আমৰা (āmora)
- Malayalam: അംബഴം (ambazham)
- Bengali: আমড়া (āmrā)
- Kannada: ಅಮಟೆಕಾಯಿ (amaṭekāyi)
- Odia: ଆମ୍ବଳା/ଆମ୍ବଡ଼ା (āmbåḷā/āmbåṛā)
- Lhotshamkha (Bhutan): amara
- Nepali language: लापसी (lāpsi)
- Pakho: Ao Naga

== Uses ==
The fruits have a sour taste and can be eaten raw or made into jams, jellies, or juices. They can also be used as feed for pigs (hence the common name "hog plum").

In the Philippines, libas leaves and fruits are used as a souring agent in various native dishes like sinigang, sinanglay, or laing.

In India, ambda pickle is made using quartered ambda fruits preserved in mustard oil, salt, and spices. Along with mango and chili pepper pickle, it is the most common type of pickle found in households in many parts of India.

== Gallery ==
Spondias pinnata specimens from Kerala, India:

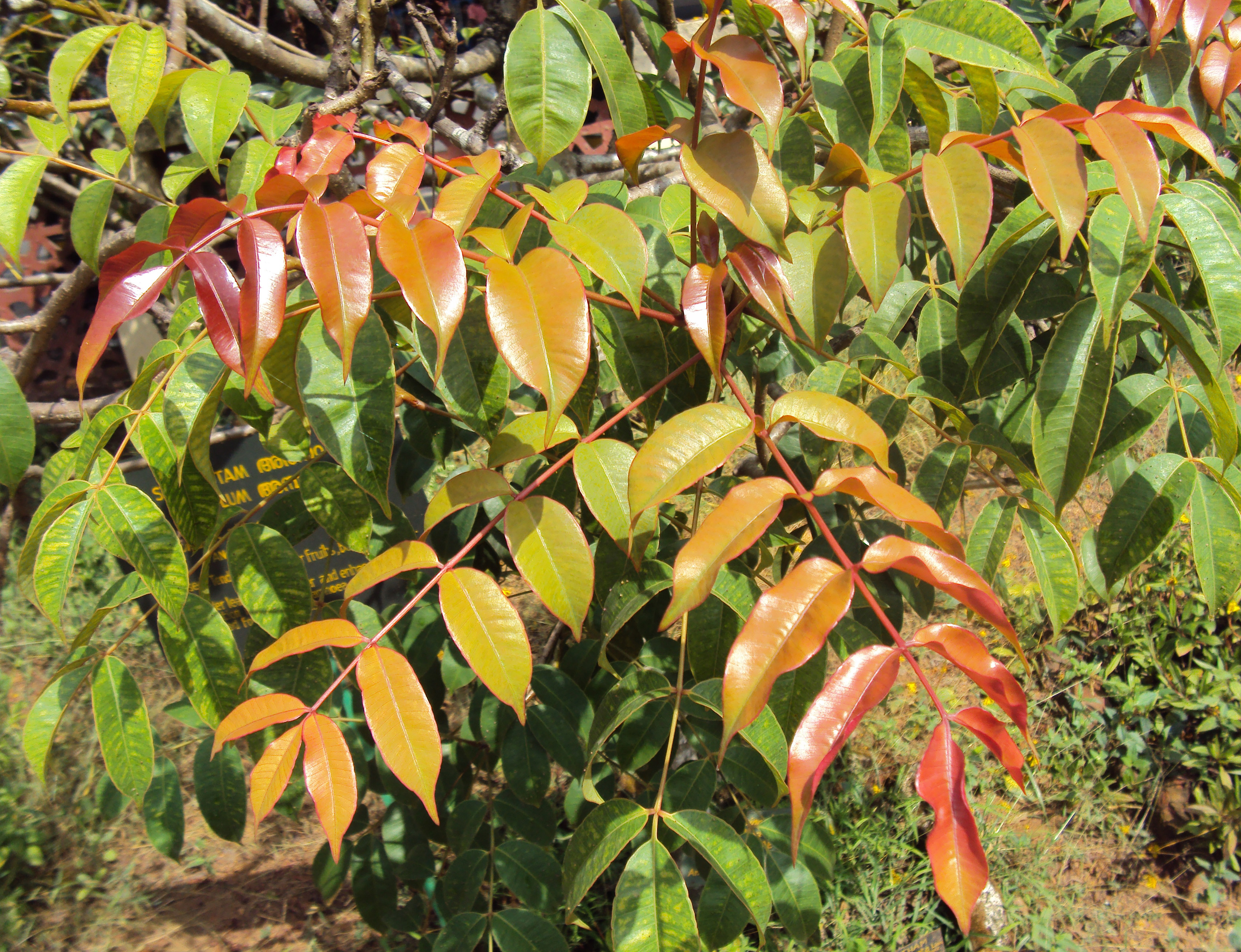

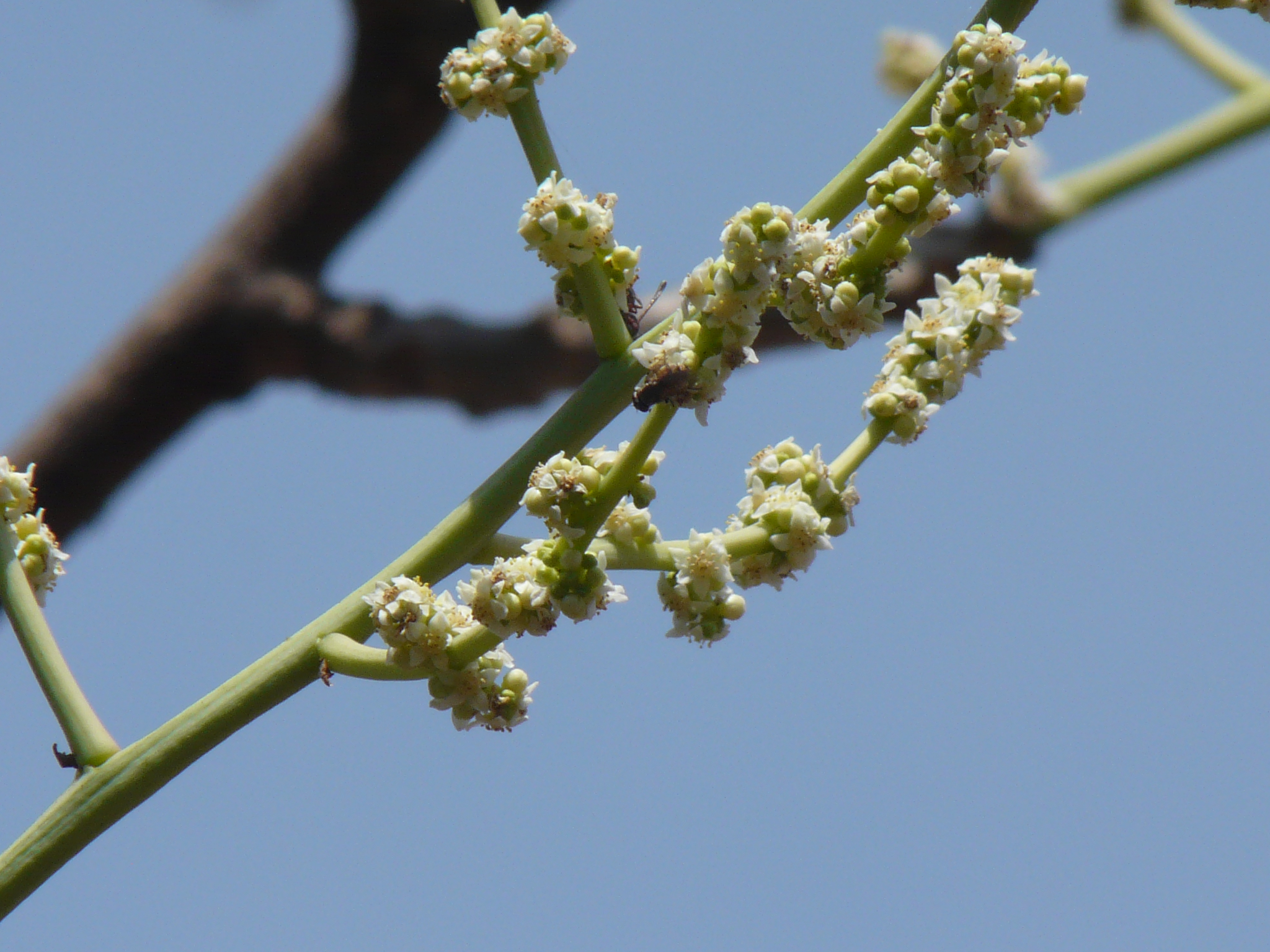

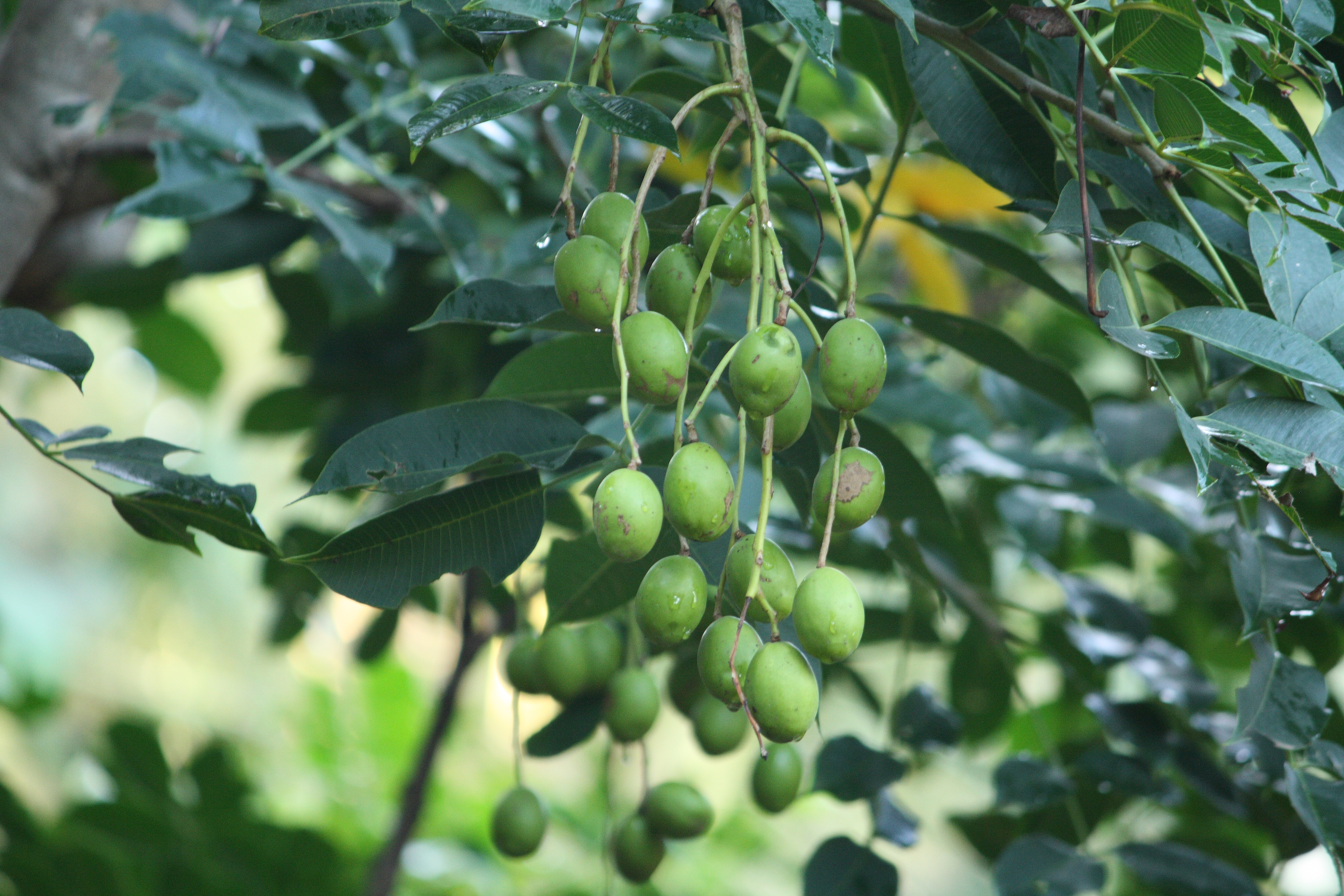

== See also ==
- Spondias purpurea (jocote), similar species from the Americas
- Spondias dulcis, similar species native to Melanesia and Polynesia
