= Benjamin Work =

New Zealand artist of Tongan descent

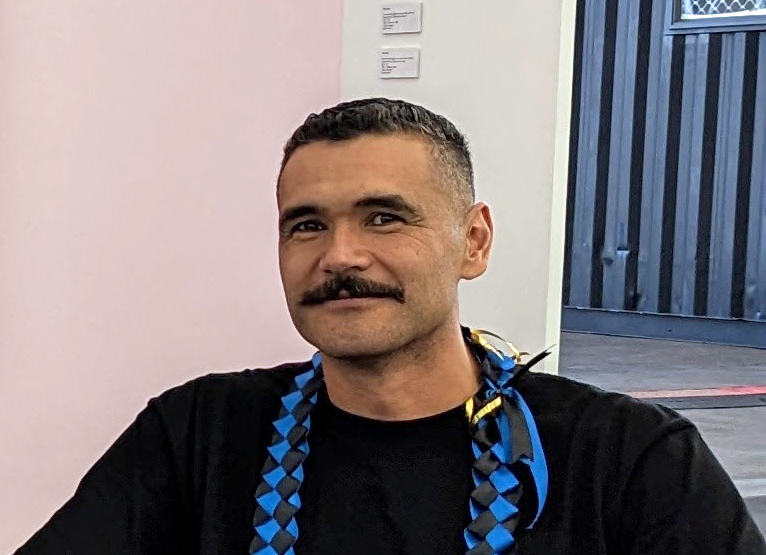
- Work in 2023
- Born: 1979 (age 46–47); Auckland, New Zealand
- Known for: painting, sculpture
- Notable work: Motutapu II (2021)
- Style: motifs from ancient Tongan artefacts

Benjamin Work (born 1979, Auckland, New Zealand) is an artist from New Zealand with Tongan and Scottish heritage. He is well known for his paintings, murals and sculptures inspired by his genealogy back to Tonga.

== Work ==
Drawing on his Tongan heritage, Work began to explore new directions in his art over the last decade. Inspired by the iconography found on Tongan treasures such as ngatu (bark cloth), fala (Tongan mats), and 'akau tau (war clubs), his refined, graphic paintings aimed to find new spaces and ways for audiences to engage with Tonga's visual culture. Work's art found a home both inside institutions and on the streets.

Work has developed a deep interest in and conducted extensive research on aspects of Tongan history and culture, and reuses Tongan traditions and symbols into his artwork. Work is part of the urban art movement and has exhibited in Australia, Mexico, New Zealand, United States, Cook Islands, and Tonga. In 2015, Work co-curated a display at the Auckland Museum with portraits from Tonga representing the royal lines of Tu’i Tonga, Tu’i Ha’atakalaua and Tu’i Kanokupolu. In 2021, he created a big 330-square-metre mural Motutapu II across the floor and up two walls of Canterbury Museum inspired by the distinctive carved patterns on Tongan ‘akau tau (war clubs) in the museum’s collection.

== Awards ==
- 2024: Fatu Feu’u Pacific Arts Prize from University of Auckland

== Selected residencies ==
- 2025: Matafatafa Aho Pacific Artist in Residency, Auckland Museum
- 2024: McCahon House Residency, Auckland, New Zealand
- 2019: Artist in Residence, Para Site, Hong Kong

== Selected solo and collaborative exhibitions ==
Work's work are held public and private collections throughout New Zealand, such as in Auckland Museum, Canterbury Museum, and The Arts House Trust.

- 2026: PĀPAAKI, 25th Biennale of Sydney, Chau Chak Wing Museum, Sydney, Australia
- 2025: Animal, Vegetable, Mineral, Gow Langsford Gallery, Onehunga, Auckland
- 2023: Bodies of Water, Made of Land (with Harrison Freeth), Te Tuhi, Auckland, New Zealand
- 2023: Bodies of Water (with Harrison Freeth), Canterbury Museum, Christchurch, New Zealand
- 2021: MOTUTAPU (with Brendan Kitto), Te Uru, Auckland, New Zealand
- 2022: Toa Motu, Bergman Gallery, Auckland, New Zealand
- 2018: Benjamin Work: Write it on the land, Seal it on the heart, Te Tuhi, Auckland, New Zealand
- 2017: Whenua Fonua 'Enua, Malcolm Smith Gallery, Auckland, New Zealand
- 2017: Return to Havaiki (with Andy Leleisi’uao), Bergman Gallery, Rarotonga, Cook Islands
- 2016: METfriday, The Metropolitan Museum of Art, New York City, United States of America
- 2016: For King and Country, Bergman Gallery, Rarotonga, Cook Islands
- 2015: Ma'ae Tu'i mo e Fonua, Māngere Arts Centre, Auckland, New Zealand
- 2015: Toutoutā, Olivia Laita Gallery, Auckland, New Zealand
- 2014: I See Red, I See Red, I See Red, Fresh Gallery, Otara, Auckland, New Zealand

== Selected group exhibitions ==
- 2023: Horizon, Bergman Gallery, Auckland, New Zealand
- 2023: Tukufakaholo – Tongan Contemporary, Bergman Gallery, Auckland, New Zealand
- 2022: Te Atuitanga – Beneath our Cloak of Stars, Bergman Gallery, Auckland, New Zealand
- 2021: The Most Dedicated, Dowse Art Museum, Wellington, New Zealand
- 2015: PGP, AMbush Gallery, Sydney
- 2013: If These Walls Could Talk, TSB Bank Wallace Arts Centre, Auckland, New Zealand
- 2013: Serigraph show, Olivia Laita Gallery, Auckland
- 2011: Primary Flight, Art Basel, Miami, United States of America

== Publications ==
- Work, Benjamin; Kitto, Brendan; Turei, Pita; Johansson, Paul; Wolfgramm, Stan (2022). Motutapu. Auckland, Aotearoa New Zealand: Rim Books. ISBN 978-1-9911652-0-6.
- Work, Benjamin (2017). Whenua Fonua 'Enua. ISBN 978-0-473-41566-2.
