= Cabinet of Tonga =

Executive branch of the government of the Kingdom of Tonga

The Cabinet of Tonga is the cabinet (executive branch) of the government of the Kingdom of Tonga. It is composed primarily of the ministers of government. The latter, including the prime minister, are appointed by the monarch. The governor of Ha'apai and the governor of Vava'u also serve on the Cabinet ex officio. When in session and presided over by the monarch, the Cabinet is known as the Privy Council.

== Fakafānua Cabinet ==
The cabinet of Prime Minister Fatafehi Fakafānua was sworn in on 6 January 2026, after being formally appointed by King Tupou VI. Crown Prince Tupoutoʻa ʻUlukalala remained minister for His Majesty's armed forces and foreign affairs. Finance Minister Lataifaingataʻa Tangimana resigned from cabinet on 15 April, after he was found guilty for engaging in bribery during the 2025 election. On 27 July, Sēmisi Sika, the minister for infrastructure and tourism, also stepped down from cabinet after the courts voided his election to the Tongatapu 2 seat for exceeding campaign spending limits. Following Sika's resignation, Fakafānua announced a cabinet shuffle, elevating Tongatapu 1 representative Tevita Puloka to cabinet, who became the infrastructure minister, while Siaosi Sovaleni, was reassigned from the health to the tourism portfolio. The prime minister also appointed two individuals from outside parliament; Vika Lavemaau, who became finance minister, and Siale ʻAkauʻola, who replaced Sovaleni as health minister. On 18 August, Puloka, ʻAkauʻola and Lavemaau were sworn into cabinet, while the latter two were also appointed to parliament as ex-officio members.

| Portfolio | Minister | Constituency | Party |
|---|---|---|---|
| Prime Minister; Minister for Meteorology, Energy, Information, Disaster Management, Environment, Communications and Climate Change; Minister for Police; Minister for Fire and Emergency Services; Minister for Prisons | Fatafehi Fakafānua | Ha‘apai (noble) | Independent |
| Deputy Prime Minister; Minister for Justice; Minister for Trade and Economic Development | Viliami Latu | People's representative for Vavaʻu 16 | Independent |
| Minister for His Majesty's Armed Forces; Minister of His Majesty's Diplomatic Services | Crown Prince Tupoutoʻa ʻUlukalala | Appointee | Independent |
| Minister for Public Enterprise; Minister for Tourism | Siaosi Sovaleni | People's representative for Tongatapu 3 | Independent |
| Minister for Health | Siale ʻAkau'ola | Appointee | Independent |
| Minister for Finance & National Planning | Vika Lavemaau | Appointee | Independent |
| Minister for Infrastructure | Tevita Puloka | People's representative for Tongatapu 1 | Independent |
| Minister for Lands and Natural Resources | Taniela Fusimalohi | People's representative for ʻEua 11 | Independent |
| Minister for Education and Training | Moʻale ʻOtunuku | People's representative for Vavaʻu 14 | Independent |
| Minister for Agriculture, Forestries, and Food; Minister for Fisheries | Viliami Sisifā | People's representative for Tongatapu 8 | Independent |
| Minister for Internal Affairs, Employment, Women, Social Protection, Youth and Sports | Fane Fotu Fituafe | People's representative for Tongatapu 6 | Independent |
| Minister for Customs and Inland Services | Sevenitini Toumoʻua | People's representative for Tongatapu 9 | Independent |

=== Former members ===
| Portfolio | Minister | Term | Constituency | Party |
|---|---|---|---|---|
| Minister for Tourism; Minister for Infrastructure | Sēmisi Sika | 6 January – 27 July 2026 | People's representative for Tongatapu 2 | Independent |
| Minister for Finance & National Planning | Lataifaingataʻa Tangimana | 6 January – 15 April 2026 | People's representative for Niua 17 | Independent |

== Past Cabinets ==
=== Eke Cabinet ===
The Eke Cabinet was appointed by ʻAisake Eke on 28 January 2025.

| Portfolio | Minister | Constituency | Party |
|---|---|---|---|
| Prime Minister; Minister of Finance; Minister for Fisheries; Minister for Prisons | ʻAisake Eke | People's representative for Tongatapu 5 | Independent |
| Deputy Prime Minister; Minister for Meteorology, Energy, Information, Disaster Management, Environment, Communications and Climate Change; Minister for Infrastructure | Taniela Fusimalohi | People's representative for ʻEua 11 | Independent |
| Minister for His Majesty's Armed Forces; Minister for Foreign Affairs | Crown Prince Tupoutoʻa ʻUlukalala | not in Parliament | |
| Minister for Education; Minister for Lands and Natural Resources | ʻUhilamoelangi Fasi | People's representative for Tongatapu 2 | Independent |
| Minister for Public Enterprises; Minister for Police; Minister for Fire and Emergency Services. | Paula Piukala | People's representative for Tongatapu 7 | DPFI |
| Minister for Tourism; Minister for Justice | Moʻale Finau | People's representative for Tongatapu 7 | Independent |
| Minister for Trade and Economic Development | Kāpelieli Lanumata | People's representative for Tongatapu 10 | |
| Minister for Revenue and Customs | Mateni Tapueluelu | People's representative for Tongatapu 4 | Independent |
| Minister for Health | Ana 'Akau'ola | not in Parliament | |
| Minister for Agriculture, Food and Forestry | Siosiua Halavātau | not in Parliament | |
| Minister for Internal Affairs | Sinaitakala Tu'itahi | not in Parliament | |

=== Sovaleni Cabinet ===
The Sovaleni Cabinet was appointed by Siaosi Sovaleni on 28 December 2021. It consisted of ten elected people's representatives, one noble, and one minister outside cabinet - long-serving diplomat Fekitamoeloa ʻUtoikamanu as Minister of Foreign Affairs and Tourism. In addition, Pita Faiva Taufatofua was named Governor of Haʻapai, while Lord Fakatulolo was reappointed as Governor of Vavaʻu.

Agriculture Minister Viliami Hingano died in June 2022. Sione Siale Fohe was appointed to replace him on 2 August 2022. The elections of Tatafu Moeaki, Poasi Tei, and Sione Sangster Saulala were declared void and they were unseated for bribery on 10 August 2022.

On 1 September 2022 Lord Vaea was appointed Minister of Internal Affairs, replacing Sangster Saulala. On 22 October 2022 Tiofilusi Tiueti was appointed as Minister of Finance, replacing Tatafu Moeaki.

Minister of Fisheries Semisi Fakahau died on 27 October 2022.

On 12 January 2024 Minister of Health Saia Piukala resigned to take up a role as WHO Regional Director for the Western Pacific Region Office. He was replaced as health minister by Siale ‘Akau’ola.

Following the resignation of Sovaleni as Prime Minister in December 2024, three noble members resigned from Cabinet. The remaining ministers continued as caretakers until their replacements were appointed in January 2025.

| Portfolio | Minister | Constituency | Party |
|---|---|---|---|
| Prime Minister; Minister for Education & Training; Minister for Police, Fire & Emergency Services; Minister for His Majesty's Armed Forces | The Hon Siaosi Sovaleni | People's representative for Tongatapu 3 | Independent |
| Deputy Prime Minister; Minister for Meteorology, Energy, Information, Disaster Management, Environment, Communications and Climate Change; Minister for Public Enterprises | The Hon Poasi Tei | People's representative for Tongatapu 6 | Independent |
| Minister for Justice and Prison | The Hon Samiu Vaipulu | People's representative for Vavaʻu 15 | Independent |
| Minister of Finance; Minister for Revenue and Customs | The Hon Tatafu Moeaki | People's representative for Tongatapu 4 | Independent |
| Minister for Lands and Natural Resources | Tonga Tuʻiʻafitu | Vavaʻu Nobles' constituency | None |
| Minister for Foreign Affairs; Minister for Tourism | The Hon Fekitamoeloa ʻUtoikamanu | not in Parliament | None |
| Minister for Health | The Hon Saia Piukala | People's representative for Vavaʻu 14 | PTOA |
| Minister for Trade and Economic Development | The Hon Viliami Latu | People's representative for Vavaʻu 16 | Independent |
| Minister for Agriculture, Food, Forests | The Hon Viliami Hingano | People's representative for Haʻapai 12 | Independent |
| Minister for Fisheries | The Hon Semisi Fakahau | People's representative for Tongatapu 8 | PTOA |
| Minister for Internal Affairs | The Hon Sione Sangster Saulala | People's representative for Tongatapu 7 | Independent |
| Minister for Infrastructure | The Hon Sevenitini Toumoʻua | People's representative for Tongatapu 9 | Independent |

=== Tuʻiʻonetoa Cabinet ===
Tuʻiʻonetoa's Cabinet was appointed by Pohiva Tuʻiʻonetoa after he was elected Prime Minister following the death of ʻAkilisi Pohiva in September 2019.

On 25 January 2021 Samiu Vaipulu was appointed Minister of Justice and Prisons, replacing Sione Vuna Fa'otusia who had resigned in December 2020. Tatafu Moeaki, a non-MP, replaced Vaipulu as Minister for Trade and Economic Development.

Government on 10 October 2019

| Portfolio | Minister | Constituency | Party |
|---|---|---|---|
| Prime Minister; Minister for Public Enterprises | The Hon Pohiva Tuʻiʻonetoa | People's representative for Tongatapu 10 | People's Party |
| Deputy Prime Minister; Minister for Justice and Prison | The Hon Sione Vuna Fa'otusia | People's representative for Tongatapu 7 | People's Party |
| Minister for Lands and Natural Resources; Minister for His Majesty's Armed Forces | Lord Maʻafu | Nobles' representative for Tongatapu | None |
| Minister of Finance; Minister for Revenue and Customs | The Hon Tevita Lavemaau | People's representative for ʻEua 11 | Independent |
| Minister for Meteorology, Energy, Information, Disaster Management, Environment, Communications and Climate Change | The Hon Poasi Tei | People's representative for Tongatapu 6 | |
| Minister for Education & Training | The Hon Dr Siaosi Sovaleni | People's representative for Tongatapu 3 | |
| Minister for Trade and Economic Development | The Hon Samiu Vaipulu | People's representative for Vavaʻu 15 | Independent |
| Minister for Infrastructure and Tourism | The Hon Dr 'Akosita Lavulavu | People's representative for Vavaʻu 16 | People's Party |
| Minister for Internal Affairs | The Hon Dr Vatau Hui | People's representative for Niua 17 | People's Party |
| Minister for Police, Fire & Emergency Services | The Hon Lord Nuku | Noble's representative for 'Eua | None |
| Minister for Agriculture, Food, Forests and Fisheries | The Hon Lord Tu’ilakepa | Noble's representative for Vava'u | None |
| Minister for Health | The Hon Dr ‘Amelia Afuha’amango Tu’ipulotu | not in Parliament | |

=== Pōhiva Cabinet ===
The previous Cabinet results from the November 2014 general election. ʻAkilisi Pōhiva, leader of the Democratic Party of the Friendly Islands and long-standing leader of the movement campaigning for democracy in Tonga, was elected Prime Minister by the new Parliament on 29 December. He was supported by fifteen of the seventeen People's Representatives: all ten MPs from his party, and five of the seven independent members. Conversely, all nine Nobles' Representatives voted for his rival, Samiu Vaipulu. Pohiva thus became the first commoner in Tonga to be elected Prime Minister by a predominantly elected Parliament. He appointed the following government on 30 December. Drawing from his majority in Parliament, all of his ministers are People's Representatives, with one exception. By law, the Ministry for Land must be entrusted to a Noble, and Pohiva thus invited incumbent minister Lord Maʻafu to retain that position. Pōhiva died on 12 September 2019 and Semisi Sika took over as acting prime minister.

Government on 30 December 2014

| Portfolio | Minister | Constituency | Party |
|---|---|---|---|
| Prime Minister; Minister for Foreign Affairs and Trade; Minister for Education and Training | The Hon ʻAkilisi Pōhiva | People's representative for Tongatapu 1 | Democratic Party of the Friendly Islands |
| Deputy Prime Minister; Minister for Environment and Communication | The Hon Siaosi Sovaleni | People's representative for Tongatapu 3 | Independent |
| Minister for Lands and Natural Resources | Lord Maʻafu | Nobles' representative for Tongatapu | None |
| Minister for Agriculture, Food, Forestry and Fisheries | The Hon Semisi Fakahau | People's representative for Tongatapu 8 | Democratic Party of the Friendly Islands |
| Minister of Justice | The Hon Sione Vuna Fa'otusia | People's representative for Tongatapu 7 | Democratic Party of the Friendly Islands |
| Minister of Infrastructure and Works | The Hon ‘Etuate Lavulavu | People's representative for Vavaʻu 16 | Independent |
| Minister of Police, Tourism, Labour and Commerce | The Hon Dr Pohiva Tuʻiʻonetoa | People's representative for Tongatapu 10 | Independent |
| Minister for Internal Affairs, Women, Culture, Youth and Sports | The Hon Fe’ao Vakatā | People's representative for Ongo Niua 17 | Democratic Party of the Friendly Islands |
| Minister for Health | The Hon Dr Saia Piukala | People's representative for Vavaʻu 14 | Independent |
| Minister for Finance and National Planning | The Hon Dr ʻAisake Eke | People's representative for Tongatapu 4 | Democratic Party of the Friendly Islands |
| Minister for Public Enterprises | The Hon Poasi Tei | People's representative for Tongatapu 6 | Independent |
| Minister for Revenue and Customs | The Hon Tevita Lavemaau | People's representative for 'Eua 11 | Independent |

=== Tuʻivakano Cabinet ===
This Cabinet results from the November 2010 general election, the first enabling ordinary citizens to elect a majority of Members of Parliament, and the first also enabling Parliament to elect the Prime Minister. After being elected Prime Minister by Parliament, Lord Tuʻivakanō appointed the following as his Cabinet. His decision to appoint Dr. Ana Taufeʻulungaki and Clive Edwards, who were not Members of Parliament, was met with some controversy, but Tuʻivakanō defended his choice on the grounds of their experience. It also meant that the Ministry for Women's Affairs would be headed by a woman; as all members of the legislature were men, appointing a Member of Parliament to the position would have meant it being held by a man.

The Democratic Party of the Friendly Islands, which had won twelve of the seventeen seats allotted to people's representatives in the Assembly, requested six seats in Cabinet, but was awarded only two, generating some disagreements within the party itself. Senior party MPs ʻAkilisi Pohiva and ʻIsileli Pulu nevertheless accepted the proposed Cabinet positions.

Lord Tuʻivakanō's first Cabinet, announced at the beginning of January 2011, was thus the following. On 13 January, however, newly appointed Health Minister ʻAkilisi Pohiva (People's representative for Tongatapu 1) resigned, in protest over his party having only two Cabinet positions, and refusing to be bound by collective Cabinet responsibility. He was replaced by ʻUliti Uata (DPFI, People's Representative for Haʻapai 13) on 25 January.

| Portfolio | Minister | Constituency | Party |
|---|---|---|---|
| Prime Minister, Minister for Foreign Affairs, Minister for Defence, Minister for Information and Communication | Lord Tuʻivakanō | Nobles' representative for Tongatapu | None |
| Deputy Prime Minister, Minister for Justice, Minister for Transport and Works | Samiu Kuita Vaipulu | People's representative for Vavaʻu 15 | Independent |
| Minister for Lands, Survey, Natural Resources and Environment and Climate Change | Lord Maʻafu | Nobles' representative for Tongatapu | None |
| Minister for Agriculture, Food, Forests and Fisheries | Lord Vaea | Nobles' representative for Tongatapu | None |
| Minister for Finance | Sunia Manu Fili | People's representative for ʻEua 11 | Independent |
| Minister for Training, Employment, Youth and Sports | Feʻaomoeata Vakata | People's representative for Niuas 17 | Independent |
| Minister for Police, Prisons and Fire Services | Viliami Latu | People's representative for Vavaʻu 16 | Independent |
| Minister for Labour, Commerce and Industries | Lisiate ʻAloveita ʻAkolo | People's representative for Vavaʻu 14 | Independent |
| Minister for Health | ʻAkilisi Pohiva | People's representative for Tongatapu 1 | Democratic Party of the Friendly Islands |
| Minister for Tourism | ʻIsileli Pulu | People's representative for Tongatapu 4 | Democratic Party of the Friendly Islands |
| Minister for Revenue Services and Public Enterprises | Wiliam Clive Edwards | not in Parliament | People's Democratic Party |
| Minister for Education, Women Affairs and Culture | Dr. ʻAna Maui Taufeʻulungaki | not in Parliament | None |

On September 1, 2011, following a reshuffle which switched portfolios around without adding any new minister nor removing any, the Cabinet was as follows:

| Portfolio | Minister | Constituency | Party |
|---|---|---|---|
| Prime Minister, Minister for Foreign Affairs, Minister for Defence, Minister for Information and Communication | Lord Tuʻivakanō | Nobles' representative for Tongatapu | None |
| Deputy Prime Minister, Minister for Transport and Works | Samiu Kuita Vaipulu | People's representative for Vavaʻu 15 | Independent |
| Minister for Lands, Survey, Natural Resources and Environment and Climate Change | Lord Maʻafu | Nobles' representative for Tongatapu | None |
| Minister for Agriculture, Food, Forests and Fisheries | Lord Vaea | Nobles' representative for Tongatapu | None |
| Minister for Finance and Inland Revenue | Sunia Manu Fili | People's representative for ʻEua 11 | Independent |
| Minister for Training, Employment, Youth and Sports | Feʻaomoeata Vakata | People's representative for Niuas 17 | Independent |
| Minister for Tourism | Viliami Latu | People's representative for Vavaʻu 16 | Independent |
| Minister for Police, Prisons and Fire Services | Lisiate ʻAloveita ʻAkolo | People's representative for Vavaʻu 14 | Independent |
| Minister for Health | ʻUliti Uata | People's representative for Haʻapai 13 | Democratic Party of the Friendly Islands |
| Minister for Labour, Commerce and Industries | ʻIsileli Pulu | People's representative for Tongatapu 4 | Democratic Party of the Friendly Islands |
| Minister for Justice; Minister for Public Enterprises | Wiliam Clive Edwards | not in Parliament | People's Democratic Party |
| Minister for Education, Women Affairs and Culture | Dr. ʻAna Maui Taufeʻulungaki | not in Parliament | None |

In mid-April 2012, another reshuffle was announced, to be effective from 1 May. Lisiate ʻAkolo, the Minister for Police, was to become Minister for Finance and National Planning. Sunia Fili, the Minister for Finance and Revenue, was to take over the Police, Prisons & Fire Services portfolio; Sosefo Vakata, Minister for Training, Employment, Youth and Sports, would become Minister for Revenue. Lord Vaea, in addition to retaining his Agriculture, Food, Forests and Fisheries portfolio, would take over Vakata's erstwhile ministry. The reshuffle was implemented on 1 May.

In late June, three ministers (ʻIsileli Pulu (Labour), Sunia Fili (Police) and ʻUliti Uata (Health)) resigned, so as to support a motion of no confidence tabled by their party (DPFI) against the government. On 1 July, Sangster Saulala broke ranks with the DPFI to join the government, but resigned and rejoined the opposition the next day. On 5 July, Lord Tuʻiʻafitu was appointed Minister for Health. The other vacated portfolios remained vacant; Matangi Tonga pointed out that "the selection is difficult because of the very few friendly members of parliament left to choose from", as the (delayed) motion of no confidence loomed. On 13 July, Saulala joined the government once more, as Minister for Agriculture, Forestry, Fisheries and Food. He argued that, although he was breaking ranks with his own party, it was the wish of his constituents.

No further announcement was made until 7 January 2013, when Lord Tuʻivakanō announced the following Cabinet:

| Portfolio | Minister | Constituency | Party |
|---|---|---|---|
| Prime Minister, Minister for Foreign Affairs and Trade, Minister for Defence, Minister for Information and Communication, Acting Minister for Police, Fire Services and Prisons | Lord Tuʻivakanō | Nobles' representative for Tongatapu | None |
| Deputy Prime Minister, Minister for Infrastructure | Samiu Kuita Vaipulu | People's representative for Vavaʻu 15 | Independent |
| Minister for Lands, Environment, Climate Change and Natural Resources | Lord Maʻafu | Nobles' representative for Tongatapu | None |
| Minister for Education and Training | Dr. ʻAna Maui Taufeʻulungaki | not in Parliament | None |
| Minister for Health | Lord Tuʻiʻafitu | Nobles' representative for Vavaʻu | None |
| Minister for Finance and National Planning | Lisiate ʻAloveita ʻAkolo | People's representative for Vavaʻu 14 | Independent |
| Minister for Commerce and Tourism | Viliami Latu | People's representative for Vavaʻu 16 | Independent |
| Minister for Internal Affairs | Lord Vaea | Nobles' representative for Tongatapu | None |
| Minister for Justice; Minister for Public Enterprises | Wiliam Clive Edwards | not in Parliament | People's Democratic Party |
| Minister for Revenue Services | Feʻaomoeata Vakata | People's representative for Niuas 17 | Independent |
| Minister for Agriculture, Food, Forests and Fisheries | Sangster Saulala | People's representative for Tongatapu 7 | Democratic Party of the Friendly Islands (dissident) |

On 2 February 2013, there was another reshuffle. Sifa Tuʻutafaiva, DPFI MP for Tongatapu 6, was appointed Minister for Police, Prisons and Fire Services, and Minister for Revenue Services, his first ministerial appointments. Feʻaomoeata Vakata, until then Minister for Revenue Services, was shuffled to the position of Minister of Public Enterprises, replacing Clive Edwards, who retained his other position as Minister for Justice.

On 9 January 2014, Finance Minister Lisiate ‘Akolo was sacked after publicly criticising aspects of the budget. ʻAisake Eke, Independent MP for Tongatapu 5, was appointed in his place.

=== Sevele Cabinet ===
For the most part, the Cabinet below results from a reshuffle in May 2009, but Teisina Fuko was subsequently appointed Minister for Revenue Services in October, and Samiu Vaipulu became Minister of Justice in November. John Cauchi became Attorney General in May 2009, but resigned in April 2010.

| Portfolio | Minister |
|---|---|
| Prime Minister, Minister of Communication, Mininister of Disaster Relief & Activities, Mininister of Labour, Commerce, and Industries | Dr. Feleti Sevele |
| Deputy Prime Minister, Minister of Health | Dr. Viliami Tangi |
| Minister of Agriculture, Food, Fisheries, and Forestry | HSH Prince Tu'ipelehake Viliami Tupoulahi Mailefihi Tuku'aho |
| Minister of Civil Aviation, Marine, and Ports | Paul Karalus |
| Minister of Defense, Minister of Foreign Affairs | Dr. Feleti Sevele (acting) |
| Minister of Education, Women's Affairs, and Culture | Tevita Hala Palefau |
| Minister of Finance | Siosiua 'Utoikamanu |
| Minister of Justice | Samiu Vaipulu |
| Attorney General | vacant |
| Minister of Lands, Survey, Natural Resources, and Environment | Siosa'ia Ma'ulupekotofa Tuita |
| Minister of Police, Fire Services, and Prisons | Dr. Viliami Tangi (acting) |
| Minister of Tourism | Fineasi Funaki |
| Minister of Training, Employment, Youth, and Sports | Siale'ataonga Tu'ivakano |
| Minister of Works | Lord Nuku |
| Minister of Information and Communication | 'Eseta Fusitu'a |
| Minister of Revenue Services | Teisina Fuko |
| Governor of Ha'apai | Malupo |
| Governor of Vava'u | Sonatane Tu'akinamolahi Taumoepeau Tupou |

Source: "Tonga", C.I.A.
