= List of international trips made by Winston Peters as Minister of Foreign Affairs of New Zealand =

This is a list of international visits undertaken by Winston Peters while Minister of Foreign Affairs within New Zealand. Peters served as Foreign Minister under three different Prime Ministers, Helen Clark, Jacinda Ardern, and Christopher Luxon.

== Summary ==
=== States visited ===
Peters made the following visits to overseas locations: as of 2026 April.

- 10 visits to Australia
- 10 visits to United States
- 8 visits to Fiji
- 8 visits to Samoa
- 6 visits to Tonga
- 6 visit to Vanuatu
- 6 visit to Singapore
- 6 visits to Papua New Guinea
- 5 visits to Japan
- 5 visits to Indonesia
- 5 visit to Malaysia
- 5 visit to Cook Islands
- 4 visits to Turkey
- 4 visit to South Korea
- 4 visit to United Kingdom
- 4 visit to Philippines
- 3 visits to China
- 3 visits to India
- 3 visit to France
- 3 visit to Vietnam
- 3 visit to Sweden
- 3 visit to Solomon Islands
- 2 visits to Russia
- 2 visit to Ireland
- 2 visit to Germany
- 2 visit to Poland
- 2 visit to Finland
- 2 visit to Brazil
- 2 visit to Argentina
- 2 visit to Uruguay
- 2 visit to Nauru
- 2 visit to Belgium
- 2 visit to New Caledonia
- 2 visit to Thailand
- 2 visit to Kiribati
- 2 visit to Tuvalu
- 2 visit to Marshall Islands
- 2 visit to Chile
- 1 visit to North Korea
- 1 visit to Malta
- 1 visit to Niue
- 1 visit to Austria
- 1 visit to Ukraine
- 1 visit to Hungary
- 1 visit to Switzerland
- 1 visit to Estonia
- 1 visit to Italy
- 1 visit to Spain
- 1 visit to Portugal
- 1 visit to Netherlands
- 1 visit to Antarctica
- 1 visit to South Africa
- 1 visit to Slovenia
- 1 visit to Denmark
- 1 visit to Iceland
- 1 visit to Norway
- 1 visit to Peru
- 1 visit to United Arab Emirates
- 1 visit to Egypt
- 1 visit to Timor Leste
- 1 visit to Palau
- 1 visit to Sri Lanka
- 1 visit to Nepal
- 1 visit to French Polynesia

== International Trips as Foreign Minister under Helen Clark (2005-2008) ==
Peters as Foreign Minister from 19 October 2005 to 29 August 2008. Among the notable trips during this tenure was Peters' visit to North Korea, which marked one of the first times a western Foreign Minister beyond the U.S. Secretary of State had visited the nation.

	Country	Locations	Details	Dates
1	Korea	Busan	Attended the Asia-Pacific Economic Cooperation Ministerial Meeting, alongside Minister of Trade Phil Goff and Minister for Trade Negotiations Jim Sutton.	15–16 November 2005
2	Malta	Valletta	2005 Commonwealth Foreign Ministers Meeting	25–27 November 2005
3	United Kingdom	London, Glasgow, Edinburgh	Met with Foreign Secretary Jack Straw and other junior ministers.	28 November – 3 December 2005
4	Malaysia	Kuala Lumpur	Attended the inaugural Foreign Minister meeting prior to the first East Asia Summit.	8–11 December 2005
5	Fiji	Suva	Met with Prime Minister Laisenia Qarase, holding discussions surrounding the integrity and security of the Fijian Election Process, and regarding aid.	9–11 February 2006
6	Tonga Samoa Niue		Met with Tongan Prime Minister Feleti Sevele and then Crown Prince Tupouto'a. Met with Samoan Prime Minister Tuilaʻepa Saʻilele Malielegaoi.	12–14 March 2006
7	Austria	Vienna	Met with Foreign Minister Ursula Plassnik.	15–19 April 2006
8	Russia	Moscow	Met with Foreign Minister Sergey Lavrov.	19 April 2006
9	Ukraine	Kyiv	Met with President Viktor Yushchenko and Acting Foreign Minister Tarasyuk.	19–21 April 2006
10	Russia	Saint Petersburg		21–23 April 2006
11	United Kingdom	London	Served as New Zealand's representative for Anzac Day ceremonies.	23–26 April 2006
12	Ireland	Dublin	Met with Irish Minister's responsible for Foreign Affairs and racing.	26–28 April 2006
13	Papua New Guinea	Port Moresby	Met with Foreign Minister Rabbie Namaliu and Acting Prime Minister Moi Avei.	25 May 2006
14	Japan	Okinawa (city)	Attended the Pacific Alliance Leaders Meeting (PALM 4).	27–29 May 2006
15	Vanuatu	Port Vila	Led a delegation of New Zealand Ministers, Members of Parliament, and other New Zealand government, civic, and business leaders.	5–9 June 2006
16	Cook Islands	Avarua	Led a delegation of New Zealand Ministers, Members of Parliament, and other New Zealand government, civic, and business leaders.	10–11 June 2006
17	France Hungary Germany Poland Switzerland	Paris, Budapest, Berlin, Warsaw, and Bern	Met with the French Foreign Minister and Minister of Cooperation and Development and the leaders of the French Pacific territories of New Caledonia, French Polynesia, and Wallis and Futuna. Met with the German Vice-Chancellor and Foreign Minister.	25 June – 9 July 2006
18	United States	Washington, D.C.	Met with Secretary of State Condoleezza Rice, National Security Advisor Stephen Hadley, Senators Richard Lugar and John McCain.	18–19 July 2006
19	Australia	Adelaide	Met with Alexander Downer.	22 July 2006
20	Malaysia	Kuala Lumpur	Attended the Post-Ministerial Conference for ASEAN.	26–28 July 2006
21	United States	New York City	Attended a meeting of the United Nations General Assembly	20–25 September 2006
22	Finland	Helsinki	Met with the Finnish Foreign Minister Erkki Tuomioja, regarding New Zealand and the European Union's relationship.	25–28 September 2006
23	Estonia	Tallinn	Met with Estonian Foreign Minister Urmas Paet.	28–29 September 2006
24	Vietnam	Hanoi	Attended a joint meeting of Foreign and Trade Ministers alongside Phil Goff, ahead of the APEC Leader's Summit.	13–17 November 2006
25	Philippines	Cebu	Attended the second East Asia Summit, which was originally scheduled to occur from the 8th of December to the 11th of December in the prior year, but was delayed due to a strong cyclone.	10–15 January 2007
26	Vanuatu	Port Vila	Attended a Pacific Islands Forum meeting, discussing the 2006 Fijian coup d'état.	16 March 2007
27	Brazil Argentina Uruguay		Met with Brazilian President Luiz Inácio Lula da Silva, Argentine Foreign Minister Jorge Taiana, and Uruguay's President and Foreign Minister Tabaré Vázquez and Reinaldo Gargano respectively.	20 March – 3 April 2007
28	Australia	Sydney	Spoke at the annual Australia New Zealand Leadership Forum	22 April 2007
29	Turkey	Gallipoli	Attended Anzac Day commemorations.	24 – 26 April 2007
30	Italy	Rome	Met Italian Foreign Minister Massimo D'Alema.	4 May 2007
31	Germany	Berlin	Met with German officials as part of New Zealands meetings with the European Union Presidency.	5 May 2007
32	Indonesia	Jakarta	First meeting of a Joint Ministerial Commission between New Zealand and Indonesia.	8 – 9 May 2007
33	China	Xinjiang, Beijing	Met with Chinese Foreign Minister Yang Jiechi.	20 – 26 May 2007
34	Tonga	Nukuʻalofa	Met with Tongan Foreign Minister Tu'a Taumoepeau, Prime Minister Feleti Sevele, and George Tupou V along with various other Tongan cabinet ministers.	7 June 2007
35	Solomon Islands Marshall Islands Samoa		Led a delegation of New Zealand Members of Parliament, business officials, and other New Zealand-based officials.	8 – 15 July 2007
36	South Korea	Seoul	Met with South Korean Foreign Minister Song Min-soon.	29 July – 3 August 2007
37	Philippines	Manila	Attended ASEAN summit.	3–6 August 2007
38	Australia	Sydney	Attended an Asia-Pacific Economic Cooperation summit. Additionally met with counterparts from the United States, Russia, and Canada.	4–9 September 2007
39	Spain Portugal	Madrid, Lisbon	Met with Spanish Foreign Minister Miguel Ángel Moratinos, then with Portuguese Foreign Minister Luís Amado.	17–21 September 2007
40	Netherlands Sweden France	The Hague, Stockholm, Paris	Met with Dutch Foreign Minister Maxime Verhagen, Swedish Foreign Minister Carl Bildt and International Development Cooperation Minister Gunilla Carlsson, and the Vice President of the National Assembly of France.	14–20 October 2007
41	North Korea	Pyongyang	Met with President Kim Yong-nam and Foreign Minister Pak Ui-chun.	16–18 November 2007
42	United States	Washington, D.C.	Met with American officials regarding Peters' talks in North Korea.	18–20 November 2007
43	Singapore	Singapore	Attended the East Asia Summit Foreign Ministers’ meeting.	20–22 November 2007
44	Papua New Guinea	Port Moresby	Met with Prime Minister Michael Somare and Foreign Minister Sam Abal.	7–11 December 2007
45	Antarctica	Scott Base	Visited a New Zealand held outpost in the Ross Dependency.	30 January – 2 February 2008
46	South Africa Zambia		Met with South African Deputy President Phumzile Mlambo-Ngcuka and Foreign Minister Nkosazana Dlamini-Zuma. Met with Zambian President Levy Mwanawasa, Foreign Minister Kabinga Pande, and Finance and National Planning Minister Ng'andu Peter Magande.	10–23 February 2008
47	South Korea	Seoul	Attended the inauguration of South Korean President Lee Myung-bak.	25 February 2008
48	Samoa	Apia	Met with Prime Minister Tuilaʻepa Saʻilele Malielegaoi, alongside then Labour Minister of Immigration and future New Zealand First MP, Shane Jones.	3 February 2008
49	Turkey	Gallipoli	Attended Anzac Day commemorations.	21–29 April 2008
50	Slovenia	Ljubljana	Met with Slovenian Officials for New Zealand's 6 month meetings with the European Union Presidency.	30–31 April 2008
51	Fiji	Suva	The Foreign Ministers of Australia, New Zealand, Papua New Guinea, Samoa, Tonga, and Tuvalu visited Fiji, aiming to return the country to democratic rule following the 2006 Fijian coup d'état.	16–17 July 2008
52	Singapore	Singapore	Attended an ASEAN summit.	21–25 July 2008

== International trips as foreign minister under Jacinda Ardern (2017-2020) ==
Peters as Foreign Minister from 26 October 2017 to 6 November 2020

	Country	Locations	Details	Dates
1	Vietnam The Philippines		Meeting with Foreign Ministers of Vietnam and the Philippines as part of the inter-governmental forum Asia-Pacific Economic Cooperation.	7–15 November 2017
2	Australia	Sydney	Australia–New Zealand Leader's Meeting with the Prime Minister and a parliamentary delegation.	1–2 March 2018
3	Samoa Tonga Cook Islands Nauru		Pacific Mission.	4–9 March 2018
4	Belgium United Kingdom Singapore		2018 Commonwealth Heads of Government Meeting	12–25 April 2018
5	New Caledonia		Pacific Leaders visit to New Caledonia with a parliamentary delegation and international Pacific counterparts.	4–6 May 2018
6	Japan		Pacific Island Leaders Meeting. Met with counterparts in Japan.	18–21 May 2018
7	China	Beijing	Bilateral meetings and events.	24–27 May 2018
8	Singapore	Singapore	Attended the East Asia Summit and the Asian Regional Forum.	2–8 August 2018
9	Samoa	Apia	Pacific Islands Forum Foreign Ministers Meeting.	9-11 August 2018
10	Australia	Canberra	Met with Australian counterparts and members of the press corps for events and bilateral discussions.	21–23 August 2018
11	Vanuatu	Port Vila	Met with Vanuatuan counterparts with the Under-Secretary for Foreign Affairs.	23–25 August 2018
12	Nauru		Attended the Pacific Islands Forum with Jacinda Ardern.	3–6 September 2018
13	Thailand Indonesia	Bangkok Jakarta	Bilateral talks and events with Thai and Indonesian counterparts.	1–6 October 2018
14	Australia	Flemington Racecourse, Melbourne	Attending the Lexus Melbourne Cup.	6 November 2018
15	Sweden United Kingdom France Ireland		Attended Armistice Day commemorations and a Peace Forum.	8–14 November 2018
16	Singapore	Singapore	Met with Singaporean counterparts as part of the East Asia Summit.	14–15 November 2018
17	Papua New Guinea	Port Moresby	Attended Asia-Pacific Economic Cooperation Ministers Meeting.	15–16 November 201
18	United States	Washington, D.C.	Met with counterparts from the United States.	13–19 December 2018
19	Fiji Kiribati Tuvalu			26 February – 2 March 2019
20	Turkey Indonesia			20 March 2019
21	Malaysia			26–28 March 2019
22	Denmark Iceland Norway Finland			21–28 April 2019
23	Fiji	Suva		14–16 May 2019
24	Cook Islands			24–26 May 2019
25	Vanuatu Solomon Islands			4–8 June 2019
26	Chile Peru	Santiago Lima		2–6 July 2019
27	United States	Washington, D.C.		15–20 July 2019
28	Fiji	Suva		25–27 July 2019
29	Thailand	Bangkok		31 July – 4 August 2019
30	Papua New Guinea Australia			2–5 October 2019
31	South Korea Japan			28 October – 3 November 2019
32	United States	Washington, D.C.		13–17 November 2019
33	Japan			22–24 November 2019
34	United Arab Emirates			26–30 November 2019
35	Samoa	Apia		13–14 December 2019
36	India			25–29 February 2020

== International Trips as Foreign Minister under Christopher Luxon (2023-present) ==
Peters as Foreign Minister from 27 November 2023 to present.

	Country	Locations	Details	Dates
1	Fiji	Suva	Met with Prime Minister of Fiji Sitiveni Rabuka and Pacific Islands Forum Secretary-General Henry Puna.	15–16 December 2023
2	Australia	Melbourne	Attended the inaugural Australia and New Zealand Foreign and Defence Ministers’ Meeting, alongside Minister of Defence Judith Collins to meet their Australian Minister for Foreign Affairs Penny Wong and Minister for Defence Richard Marles.	31 January 2024
3	Tonga	Nukuʻalofa	Met with the Prime Minister of Tonga Siaosi Sovaleni, Minister of Foreign Affairs Fekitamoeloa ʻUtoikamanu, Minister of Health Siale ʻAkau'ola, and Minister of Finance Tiofilusi Tiueti.	6 February 2024
4	Cook Islands	Avarua	Met with the Prime Minister of the Cook Islands Mark Brown.	7 February 2024
5	Samoa	Apia	Met with the Samoan Head of State Tuimalealiʻifano Vaʻaletoʻa Sualauvi II and Prime Minister Fiamē Naomi Mataʻafa.	8 February 2024
6	India	Ahmedabad New Delhi	Met with the Chief Minister of Gujarat Bhupendrabhai Patel, External Affair's Minister S. Jaishankar, Vice President Jagdeep Dhankhar, and National Security Advisor Ajit Doval.	10–13 March 2024
7	Indonesia	Jakarta	Met with then Minister of Defence and President-Elect Prabowo Subianto and Minister of Foreign Affairs Retno Marsudi.	14–15 March 2024
8	Singapore	Singapore	Met with Minister of Foreign Affairs Maliki Osman, Minister of Defence Ng Eng Hen, and Chair of the Clermont Group Richard Chandler.	15 March 2024
9	Egypt	Cairo	Met with Foreign Minister Sameh Shoukry and Arab League Secretary General Ahmed Aboul Gheit.	1 April 2024
10	Poland	Warsaw	Met with Radosław Sikorski and Ukrainian refugees.	2 April 2024
11	Belgium	Brussels	Met with Foreign Ministers from across NATO including Antony Blinken and David Cameron.	3–4 April 2024
12	Sweden	Stockholm	Met with Foreign Minister Tobias Billström.	5–6 April 2024
13	United States United Nations	New York City Washington, D.C.	Met with Secretary-General of the United Nations António Guterres, President of the General Assembly of the United Nations Dennis Francis (diplomat), Secretary of State Antony Blinken, and Senators Lindsey Graham and Chris Van Hollen.	6–12 April 2024
14	Turkey	Istanbul Gallipoli	Met with Minister of Foreign Affairs Hakan Fidan, Australian Deputy Prime Minister Richard Marles, and American Ambassador to Turkey Jeff Flake for Anzac Day celebrations.	22–28 April 2024
15	Solomon Islands, Papua New Guinea, Vanuatu, New Caledonia and Tuvalu	Various	Led a delegation of NZ MPs including Health Minister and Pacific Peoples Minister Dr Shane Reti, Climate Change Minister Simon Watts, the NZ Parliament's Foreign Affairs, Defence and Trade Committee chairperson Tim van de Molen, and Labour's foreign affairs spokesperson David Parker on a tour of several Pacific states to strengthen bilateral relations and cooperation on climate change, development and stability. On 12 May, Peters met with Solomon Islands Prime Minister Jeremiah Manele, who had succeeded Manasseh Sogavare following the 2024 Solomon Islands general election. The New Caledonia visit was cancelled due to the 2024 New Caledonia unrest.	11-18 May 2024
16	Vietnam, Malaysia, the Philippines and Timor Leste	Various	Visited several heads of government, state and foreign ministers in Vietnam, Malaysia, the Philippines and Timor Leste including Vietnamese Prime Minister Pham Minh Chinh, Vietnamese Foreign Minister Bùi Thanh Sơn, Malaysian Prime Minister Anwar Ibrahim, Filipino President Bongbong Marcos, Filipino Foreign Secretary Enrique Manalo and East Timorese President José Ramos-Horta.	4-13 June 2024
17	Japan	Tokyo	Attended the 10th Pacific Islands Leaders Meeting hosted by the Japanese Government in Tokyo with other members of the Pacific Islands Forum and French Polynesia. Peters outlined New Zealand's "foreign policy reset" in response to an increasingly multipolar world and called on the Forum to facilitate mediation following the 2024 New Caledonia unrest. Peters also met with Japanese Prime Minister Fumio Kishida, Chief Cabinet Secretary Yoshimasa Hayashi, and Defence Minister Minoru Kihara to reaffirm bilateral cooperation in engaging with the Pacific.	16-18 July 2024
18	Fiji, Marshall Islands, Federated States of Micronesia and Palau	Various	Led a delegation to visit Fiji and the three Micronesian states of Marshall Islands, Federated States of Micronesia and Palau as part of New Zealand's renewed Pacific reset strategy. Peters announced that New Zealand would invest NZ$6.2 million to help the Marshall Islands prepare for and adapt to risks related to natural disasters and climate change.	8-16 August 2024
19	Tonga	Nukuʻalofa	Attended the 53rd Pacific Islands Forum alongside Prime Minister Luxon and Minister for Pacific Peoples Shane Reti. During the Leaders Forum, Peters downplayed the effects of climate change on rising sea levels.	24–27 August 2024
20	Samoa	Apia	Attended the 2024 Commonwealth Heads of Government Meeting with Luxon. Peters and Luxon jointly announced that New Zealand would contribute $20 million to the Pacific Resilience Facility, which aims to help Pacific states prepare for disasters and boost climate resilience.	25-26 October 2024
21	China	Beijing	Peters met with Chinese Foreign Minister Wang Yi to raise New Zealand's concerns about ongoing Chinese naval exercises in the Tasman Sea and China's strategic partnership agreement with the Cook Islands.	26 February 2025
22	United States	Washington, DC	Peters met with United States Secretary of State Marco Rubio to discuss various issues of concern to New Zealand–United States relations including defence, security and economic cooperation in the Pacific. Peters also informed Rubio of New Zealand's relations with China.	18 March 2025
23	Tonga, Vanuatu, Hawaii	Nuku'alofa	Peters led a high-level parliamentary delegation to Tonga, Vanuatu and the American state of Hawaii to reaffirm New Zealand's relations with the Pacific. On 11 April. Peters met with Tongan Prime Minister ‘Aisake Valu Eke and his cabinet to reaffirm bilateral relations particularly in the areas of maritime safety, agricultural research, defence and law enforcement. During the visit, Peters announced that New Zealand would grant multiple entry visas to visitors from Pacific Islands Forum countries including from July 2025. In addition, nationals from Forum countries on temporary Australian visas would be able to visit New Zealand for up to three months without requiring a visa from November 2025. On 17 April, Peters announced that New Zealand would contribute NZ$10 million to Vanuatuan recovery efforts following the 2024 Port Vila earthquake.	10-17 April 2025
24	Australia, Sri Lanka, Nepal, and India	Adelaide, Colombo, Kathmandu and New Delhi	Peters visited Australian Foreign Minister Penny Wong in Adelaide as part of the six monthly Australia-New Zealand foreign ministers' consultations. On 28 May, he visited Sri Lankan President Anura Kumara Dissanayake, Prime Minister Harini Amarasuriya and Foreign Minister Vijitha Herath; marking the second visit by a New Zealand foreign minister since 2013. Peters also undertook the first visit by a New Zealand foreign minister to Nepal; meeting Nepalese President Ram Chandra Paudel, Prime Minister K.P. Sharma Oli and Foreign Minister Arzu Rana Deuba. During the final leg, Peters met with Indian External Affairs Minister S. Jaishankar on 31 May to discuss ongoing bilateral free trade talks.	23-31 May 2025
25	Indonesia	Jakarta	Peters visited Indonesian Foreign Minister Sugiono, marking the fourth state visit to Indonesia over the past 18 months. The two foreign ministers announced the conclusion of a halal food bilateral cooperation agreement, signed an enhanced educational exchange and research cooperation agreement, increasing the number of Indonesian scholarship places from 45 to 70, and announcing a port visit by HMNZS Te Kaha to Jakarta later in June 2025.	13 June 2025
26	Malaysia	Kuala Lumpur	Peters visited Kuala Lumpur between 9 and 12 July to attend the annual ASEAN-New Zealand Foreign Ministers' Meeting, East Asia Summit Foreign Ministers' Meeting, and ASEAN Regional Forum, which were hosted by Malaysia.	9-12 July 2025
27	Fiji	Suva	Peters visited Suva between 13 and 14 August to attend the annual Pacific Islands Forum Foreign Ministers' Meeting to discuss regional issues of concern to Forum member states.	13-14 August 2025
28	Papua New Guinea	Port Moresby	Peters and Labour foreign affairs spokesperson Peeni Henare represented New Zealand at Papua New Guinea's 50th independence anniversary celebrations in Port Moresby.	15-16 September 2025
29	United States	New York City	Peters attended the 80th session of the United Nations General Assembly and the Two-State Solution conference. On 27 September, Peters confirmed that New Zealand would not recognise Palestinian statehood on the grounds there was no "fully legitimate" state to recognise. Peters reiterated New Zealand's condemnation of Hamas and Israeli military actions and Israeli settlements in the West Bank.	21-30 September 2025
30	Kiribati	Tarawa	Peters and Kiribati Vice-President Teuea Toatu signed a statement in Tarawa renewing New Zealand's aid assistance to Kiribati in the areas of health, labour mobility and security following a review by MFAT.	19 January 2026
31	Argentina, Uruguay, Brazil, Chile, and French Polynesia	Various	Peters led a parliamentary and business delegation Argentina, Uruguay, Brazil, Chile and French Polynesia to affirm New Zealand's bilateral relations with these South American and Pacific Rim countries. He met with Argentine President Javier Milei and Foreign Minister Pablo Quirno in Buenos Aires on 3 March. On 4 March, Peters met with Uruguayan President Yamandú Orsi and Foreign Minister Mario Lubetkin. On 6 March, Peters met with several Brazilian ministers and diplomats including Foreign Minister Mauro Vieira, acting Education Minister Leonardo Barchini, and diplomat Celso Amorim. Peters also signed film and education agreements with vieira and Barchini.	Early March 2026
32	Australia	Canberra	Peters and Defence Minister Judith Collins met with their Australian counterparts Penny Wong and Richard Marles during the third annual Australia and New Zealand Foreign and Defence Ministers’ Meeting (ANZMIN) to discuss foreign policy and defence issues of interests to both countries. The ministers also expressed concerns about Chinese assertiveness in the South China Sea and human rights violations in Tibet, Xinjiang and Hong Kong. In response, the Chinese Embassy in New Zealand criticised the New Zealand and Australian governments for interfering in Chinese internal affairs, their perceived silence on US military actions during the 2026 Iran war and their alleged "poor records" on human rights and ethnic minorities.	17 March 2026
33	Cook Islands	Rarotonga	Peters visited the Cook Islands to meet with Cook Islands Prime Minister Mark Brown to discuss bilateral relations. On 2 April, Peters and Brown signed a defence and security declaration. Peter also confirmed that New Zealand would resume about NZ$29.8 million in annual aid funding to the islands territory. The two governments also mended bilateral relations, which has been strained in 2025 by the Cook Islands signing a series of partnership agreements with China. The defence and security declaration ensures that New Zealand would be privy to similar deals with third countries in the future.	1-2 April 2026
34	United States of America	Washington, DC	Peters met with United States Secretary of State Marco Rubio at the White House where the two foreign ministers discussed New Zealand-United States relations, the 2026 Iran war and the Pacific. Peters raised New Zealand's concerns about the economic and energy impact of the war on New Zealand and the Pacific Islands. He asked the United States government to send fuel tankers to the Pacific Islands to help alleviate some of the economic and fuel impact caused by the conflict. Rubio also conveyed the United States' concern about Iran's "illegal behaviour," efforts to disrupt international shipping and its "47-year record of virtually unmitigated terrorism support." Peters also invited Rubio to attend the 2027 Pacific Islands Forum meeting in Palau and confirmed the arrival of incoming United States Ambassador to New Zealand Jared Novelly.	8 April 2026
35	Philippines	Manila	Peters represented New Zealand in a caretaker capacity at the East Asia Summit in Manila following the 2026 New Zealand general election held on 7 November.	16-17 November 2026
