= Sunia Fili =

Tongan politician

Minister for Police, Prisons and Fire Services
- In office 1 May 2012 – 25 June 2012
- Prime Minister: Sialeʻataongo Tuʻivakanō
- Preceded by: Lisiate ʻAkolo
- Succeeded by: Sialeʻataongo Tuʻivakanō

Minister of Finance
- In office 3 January 2011 – 1 May 2012
- Preceded by: Afuʻalo Matoto
- Succeeded by: Lisiate ʻAkolo

Member of Parliament for
- In office 11 March 1999 – 27 November 2014
- Preceded by: Tu'ipulotu L. Lauaki
- Succeeded by: Tevita Lavemaau

Personal details
- Born: 1 December 1965 (age 60)
- Party: Human Rights and Democracy Movement; Democratic Party of the Friendly Islands

Sunia Manu Fili (born 1 December 1965) is a Tongan politician and former Cabinet Minister. He is a former member of the Human Rights and Democracy Movement and the Democratic Party of the Friendly Islands.

== Biography ==
Fili graduated with a BA from the University of the South Pacific in Fiji. He worked as a lawyer and high school teacher before entering politics. He was first elected to the Legislative Assembly as People's Representative for ʻEua at the 1999 election.

In September 2009 Fili was the only member of the Tongan Parliament to support the ratification of the Convention on the Elimination of All Forms of Discrimination Against Women.

Fili was re-elected MP for the constituency of ʻEua in the 2010 election. He was appointed Minister of Finance in Lord Tuʻivakano's Cabinet, to which was added the portfolio of Inland Revenue on September 1, 2011. In a Cabinet reshuffle on 1 May 2012, Fili became Minister for Police, Prisons and Fire Services; Lisiate ‘Akolo was made Minister of Finance, and Sosefo Vakata was given the Revenue portfolio. Following the reshuffle Fili allegedly passed a letter from his predecessor, Lisiate ʻAkolo, which criticised other ministers and suggested creating Associate Minister posts to weaken the opposition, to Deputy Prime Minister Samiu Vaipulu, who leaked it to the media. In late June 2012, Fili - along with two other ministers - resigned from the Cabinet, so as to support a motion of no confidence tabled by the Democratic Party of the Friendly Islands against the government.

In July 2014 Fili was dumped as a Democratic Party candidate. He ran as an independent in the 2014 Tongan general election, but was not re-elected. He contested the 2017 election as a candidate for the Langafonua 'a e Masiva, but was also unsuccessful.

In October 2022 he graduated with a law degree from the University of the South Pacific.
