= ʻAna Taufeʻulungaki =

Tongan academic and politician (1946–2024)

The Honourable ʻAna Taufeʻulungaki

Minister for Education, Women's Affairs and Culture
- In office 4 January 2011 – 4 January 2015
- Prime Minister: Lord Tuʻivakanō
- Preceded by: Tevita Hala Palefau
- Succeeded by: Samuela 'Akilisi Pohiva

Personal details
- Born: 10 May 1946
- Died: 18 November 2024 (aged 78)
- Party: None

ʻAna Maui Taufeʻulungaki (10 May 1946 – 18 November 2024) was a Tongan academic and politician.

== Life and career ==
Taufeʻulungaki was born on 10 May 1946. She had a Ph.D. from the University of Birmingham.

For thirty years, she worked as "teacher, school principal, curriculum developer, educational administrator and planner" in the Tongan Ministry of Education. From 1999, she then worked at the University of the South Pacific, first as Fellow, then as Director of the Institute of Education, and finally Pro Vice Chancellor for Research and Graduate Affairs, in 2006 and 2007.

In 2006, she was an observer for the University at the Pacific Islands Forum's regional Economic Ministers' Meeting (FEMM), which advises Forum leaders on "issues of economic management and development". She later criticised what she had perceived, at the meeting, as a "one dimensional approach to economic development, particularly where there is no mention of the cultural context and the socio-political issues which are associated with economic development". She warned that if investment failed to consider the cultural context of land use and ownership, "land would simply be a commodity to be developed and sold on the market. But to Pacific Islanders who see land as central to their sense of identity, the concept of the vanua is critical. If you don't deal with that concept, the economic issues won't be addressed long-term, and will probably falter." In addition, she said, ministers "talk[ed] about the economic and financial issues but they d[id]n't consider the social implications [...]. There's been discussions about economic growth but not equitable economic growth."

That same year, in a "confidential report to the University of the South Pacific" on the November riots in Nukuʻalofa, she "reportedly accused the Tongan government [led by Feleti Sevele] of 'a series of ill-timed and ill-conceived moves, which demonstrated their total inability to read the situation and which served to confirm in the minds of the pro-democracy movement that things will never change'".

Following the November 2010 general election, in which she was not a candidate, new Prime Minister Lord Tuʻivakanō appointed her Minister of Education, Women's Affairs and Culture. She was one of two persons appointed Minister despite not being a Member of Parliament (the other being Clive Edwards). She was sworn in on 13 January 2011. There had been no women elected to Parliament in November, so appointing an MP to the Ministry for Women would have meant appointing a male Minister. Her appointment, and Edwards', were somewhat controversial, but Lord Tuʻivakanō defended his choice on the grounds of their experience.

As Minister for Education, Taufeʻulungaki said education curricula had to be "relevant to the situation in Tonga, and to an increasingly inter-connected globalised world", and to "give back to the society the best value for its investment in education". She also said one of her priorities would be to "review the teacher recruitment process and strengthen teachers’ professional development".

On 26 May 2022, she was appointed to the Privy Council of Tonga.

Taufeʻulungaki died on 18 November 2024, at the age of 78.
