= Tonga Tuʻiʻafitu =

Tongan politician (born 1962)

The Honourable Lord Tuʻiʻafitu
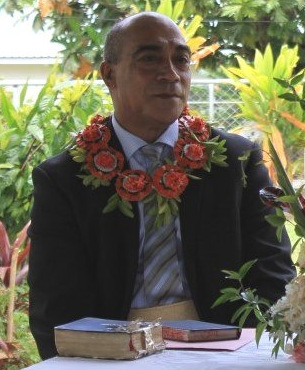
- Tu’i’afitu in 2013

Minister for Lands and Natural Resources
- In office 28 December 2021 – 10 December 2024
- Prime Minister: Siaosi Sovaleni
- Preceded by: Lord Maʻafu
- Succeeded by: ʻUhilamoelangi Fasi

Minister for Health
- In office 5 July 2012 – 27 November 2014
- Leader: Lord Tuʻivakano
- Preceded by: ‘Uliti Uata
- Succeeded by: Saia Piukala

Member of Parliament for Vavaʻu Nobles' constituency
- Incumbent
- Assumed office 25 November 2010

Personal details
- Born: October 3, 1962 (age 63)
- Party: none (Nobles' Representative)

Tonga Tuʻiʻafitu, styled Lord Tuʻiʻafitu (born October 3, 1962) is a Tongan noble, clergyman, politician and Cabinet Minister.

Tuʻiʻafitu has a BDiv degree from Siaʻatoutai Theological College and two MA degrees, in Political Science and in Public Policy, both from the Australian National University.

Tuʻiʻafitu began his career in national politics when he was elected to Parliament as Noble's Representative for Vavaʻu in the November 2010 general election. He was appointed Deputy Speaker in the Legislative Assembly. On 5 July 2012, he was appointed Minister for Health in Prime Minister Lord Tuʻivakano's Cabinet, following ‘Uliti Uata's resignation to join the Opposition.

On 28 December 2021 he was appointed to the Cabinet of Siaosi Sovaleni as Minister for Lands and Natural Resources. He was the only noble initially appointed to Sovaleni's Cabinet. Following the resignation of Sovaleni as Prime Minister in December 2024, he resigned from Cabinet.

== Honours ==
National honours

- Order of Queen Sālote Tupou III, Commander (31 July 2008).
