= Tevita Tuʻi Uata =

Tongan politician

Minister of Trade and Economic Development
- In office 4 January 2018 – 10 October 2019
- Prime Minister: ʻAkilisi Pōhiva
- Preceded by: Pohiva Tuʻiʻonetoa
- Succeeded by: Samiu Vaipulu

Personal details
- Party: Democratic Party of the Friendly Islands

Dr Tevita Tuʻi Uata is a Tongan politician and former Cabinet Minister. He is a member of the Democratic Party of the Friendly Islands (PTOA). He is the son of former MP ‘Uliti Uata.

Before entering politics uata was a democracy activist, ran a shipping company, and was president of the Tonga National Business Association. In 2007, Uata was convicted alongside ʻAkilisi Pōhiva and Sēmisi Sika of leading a protest march in June 2006. He was fined 650 paʻanga. In 2009 one of his vessels was first to reach the scene of the sinking of the MV Princess Ashika and he gave evidence that the ship was unfit to sail. In 2010 he was charged with bribery after evidence was given in the inquiry into the sinking that he had offered port authority manager Lupeti Vi an envelope of cash for clearance for his vessels to dock.

Uata ran unsuccessfully for the electorate of Tongatapu 8 in the 2014 Tongan general election, but was defeated by Semisi Fakahau.

In October 2017 Uata was appointed as chair of the Tonga Broadcasting Commission. In that position, he attempted to muzzle two senior journalists who were critical of the PTOA government. Following the DPFI landslide in the 2017 Tongan general election he was appointed as Minister of Labour and Commerce by Prime Minister ʻAkilisi Pōhiva as a Minister outside the Legislative Assembly. The portfolio was later renamed to Trade and Economic Development. In August 2019 the Tonga Maʻa Tonga Newspaper alleged that one of his companies had been granted a significant tax writeoff by Cabinet.

Following the death of ʻAkilisi Pōhiva and his replacement by Pōhiva Tuʻiʻonetoa in October 2019, Uata was not appointed to the new prime minister's Cabinet.

In April 2019 he was charged with refusing to obey a Port master's direction over the mooring of two vessels, but was subsequently acquitted.
