= Ministry of Lands and Natural Resources =

Ministry of Lands and Natural Resources may refer to:

- Ministry of Lands and Natural Resources (Ghana)
- Ministry of Lands and Natural Resources (Tonga)
- Ministry of Lands and Natural Resources (Zambia)
