= 1965 Tongan local elections =

Local elections were held in Tonga for the first time in June 1965.

== Background ==
Tongan government administration consisted of Town Officers representing the government in a single village, whilst District Officers usually served around six villages. Prior to the elections, the officers had been appointed by the Premier.
