= Maʻafu Tukuiʻaulahi =

Tongan politician and noble (1955–2021)

Lord Maʻafu of Vaini and Tokomololo
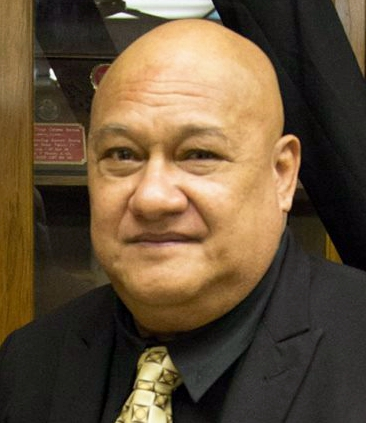

Deputy Prime Minister of Tonga
- In office 16 December 2020 – 12 December 2021
- Prime Minister: Pōhiva Tuʻiʻonetoa
- Preceded by: Sione Vuna Fa'otusia
- Succeeded by: Poasi Tei

Minister for Lands, Survey, Natural Resources
- In office 4 January 2011 – 12 December 2021
- Prime Minister: Lord Tuʻivakanō ʻAkilisi Pōhiva; Pohiva Tuʻiʻonetoa
- Preceded by: Lord Tuita

Minister for the Environment and Climate Change
- In office July 2009 – 30 December 2014
- Prime Minister: Feleti Sevele; Lord Tuʻivakanō
- Succeeded by: Siaosi Sovaleni

Member of Parliament for Tongatapu
- In office 23 April 2008 – 12 December 2021

Personal details
- Born: Siosaʻia Lausiʻi; 1 July 1955 Tonga
- Died: 12 December 2021 (aged 66) Auckland, New Zealand
- Spouse: Princess Lavinia Mataʻotahone Tukuʻaho
- Children: Hon. Tevita ʻUnga; Hon. Lavinia Fangaʻaka
- Parent(s): Hon. Tevita ʻUngamotangitau Lausiʻi; Hon. Peti Lausiʻi

'Siosaʻia Lausiʻi, Lord Maʻafu Tukuiʻaulahi, also known as Lord Maʻafu (of Vaini and Tokomololo) (1 July 1955 – 12 December 2021), was a Tongan politician, military officer, and member of the Tongan nobility.

== Biography ==
Lausiʻi was born in Tonga on 1 July 1955. He was the son of the Lord Ma’afu Tukui’aulahi, Tevita ‘Unga Tangitau, and Hon. Peti Ma’afu (nee Green). Lausiʻi enrolled in the Tonga Defence Services on 3 March 1975, and was commissioned the same year to become "Platoon Commander of the Tonga Royal Guards". He served as a commissioned officer, rising to the rank of Commanding Officer of Land Force in 2000, before serving as Private Secretary to King Taufaʻahau Tupou IV from 2001 to 2006. He married a niece of the king, Princess Lavinia Mata-‘o-Tāone, and they had two children: Hon. Tevita ʻUnga and Hon. Lavinia Fangaʻaka.

Upon the death of his father, Lausiʻi was installed as Ma’afu, Lord of Vaini and Tokomololo. The full title Maʻafu Tukuʻiʻaulahi means "Maʻafu put in the strong current".

Maʻafu entered politics for the general election in April 2008. He was elected to the Legislative Assembly as a Nobles' Representative for Tongatapu, receiving ten votes from fellow electors of the nobility. In July 2009, he was appointed Minister for the Environment and Climate Change in Prime Minister Feleti Sevele's Cabinet.

Maʻafu retained his seat in the November 2010 general election, again receiving ten votes. He was then appointed Minister for Lands, Survey, Natural Resources, Environment and Climate Change in Prime Minister Lord Tuʻivakanō's Cabinet; legislation enacted in 2010 prescribed that only a Nobles' Representative could be appointed Minister for Lands.

Following the 2014 election, Maʻafu was reappointed Minister of Lands, becoming the only noble representative in the cabinet of ʻAkilisi Pōhiva. In February 2017 he was ostracised by Tonga's nobles for his participation in Cabinet. In September 2017 he was appointed Deputy Prime Minister. He returned to Cabinet following the DPFI's landslide in the 2017 election, but resigned in March 2018 after a dispute with Minister of Police Mateni Tapueluelu. He rejoined Cabinet in May with the same portfolios.

In October 2019 Maʻafu was appointed Minister for Lands and Natural Resources and Minister for His Majesty’s Armed Forces in the cabinet of Pohiva Tuʻiʻonetoa. After Deputy Prime Minister Sione Vuna Fa'otusia resigned from the cabinet in December 2020, Maʻafu was appointed as the new Deputy Prime Minister.

Maʻafu traveled to New Zealand for medical treatment in 2021. He was still overseas at the time of the 2021 elections, and was not returned to his seat. He died in Auckland on 12 December 2021. He was succeeded as Maʻafu by his son, Tevita ‘Unga Tangitau.

== Honours ==
National honours

- Order of the Crown of Tonga, Commander (31 July 2008).
- King Taufaʻahau Silver Jubilee Medal (4 July 1992)
- Long Service and Good Conduct Medal
- General Service Medal (Bougainville)

Foreign honours

- The US Army Commendation Medal
