= Tongan Ministry of Land, Survey, and Natural Resources =

The Ministry of Lands and Natural Resources is a cabinet level department of the Government of Tonga, which administers all matters relating to land and natural resources in accordance with the Tongan Constitution and Land Act. It was formerly the Ministry of Land, Survey, and Natural Resources.

Since December 2021, the ministry has been headed by Tonga Tuʻiʻafitu.
