= Vavaʻu 15 =

Electoral constituency in Tonga

- Constituency for the Legislative Assembly of Tonga
- Region: Vavaʻu

Current constituency
- Created: 2010
- Number of members: 1
- Party: Independent
- Member: Samiu Vaipulu

Vavaʻu 15 is an electoral constituency for the Legislative Assembly in the Kingdom of Tonga. It was established for the November 2010 general election, when the multi-seat regional constituencies for People's Representatives were replaced by single-seat constituencies, electing one representative via the first past the post electoral system. Located in the Vavaʻu island group, it encompasses the villages of Neiafu, Fungamisi, Falaleu, Makave, Toula, and ‘Utui. It is one of three constituencies in Vavaʻu. (The number 15 does not mean that it is the fifteenth in Vavaʻu, but in the country.)

Its first ever (and so far only) representative is Samiu Vaipulu, a veteran politician first elected to Parliament in 1987. Following his re-election in 2010 as an independent, he was appointed Deputy Prime Minister under Prime Minister Lord Sialeʻataongo Tuʻivakanō.

== Members of Parliament ==
| Election | Member | Party |
|---|---|---|
| 2010 | Samiu Vaipulu | independent |
| 2014 | Samiu Vaipulu | independent |
| 2017 | Samiu Vaipulu | independent |
| 2021 | Samiu Vaipulu | independent |

== Election results ==
=== 2010 ===
Tongan general election, 2010: Vavaʻu 15
| Party | Candidate | Votes | % | ±% |
|---|---|---|---|---|
| Independent | Samiu Vaipulu | 618 | 33.1 | |
| (unknown) | Ualingi Salesi Paea | 362 | 19.4 | |
| (unknown) | Keuli Pasina Lavaki | 305 | 16.3 | |
| (unknown) | Viliami Kaufusi Helu | 235 | 12.6 | |
| (unknown) | Semisi Lavaka | 208 | 11.1 | |
| (unknown) | Viliami Pasikala | 138 | 7.4 | |
| Majority | | 256 | 13,7 | n/a |
| independent (politician) win (new seat) | | | | |

== See also ==
- Constituencies of Tonga
