= Tongan Democratic Labor Party =

Political party in Tonga

- Founded: 8 June 2010
- Ideology: Labourism; Social democracy

The Tongan Democratic Labor Party is a political party in Tonga. The party was founded on June 8, 2010, by members of the Tongan Public Servants Association. It planned to contest all 17 people's constituencies in the 2010 election. Five of the party's 2010 candidates were women.

The party did not win any seats in the 2010 elections.
