= 2010 Tongan general election =

- 25 November 2010
- All 26 elected seats in the Legislative Assembly; 14 seats needed for a majority
- Turnout: 90.84% (▲44.15pp)
| Party | Leader | Vote % | Seats | +/– |
|---|---|---|---|---|
| Democrats | ʻAkilisi Pōhiva | 28.49 | 12 | New |
| Independents | – | 67.30 | 5 | +2 |
This lists parties that won seats. See the complete results below.
Results by constituency
| Prime Minister before | Prime Minister after |
|---|---|
| Feleti Sevele; HRDM | Sialeʻataongo Tuʻivakanō; Independent |

General elections were held in Tonga on 25 November 2010 to elect 26 members of the Legislative Assembly. Initially expected to be held in 2011, King George Tupou V called a snap election in September 2010, following the passage of democratic reforms, which saw the monarch cede most of his executive powers to the prime minister and cabinet. The reforms also increased the people's seats from nine to 17, allowing commoners to elect a majority of members of parliament (MP), while the nobility continued to elect nine members.

Most contestants campaigned on their personal records and relied on the local ties, although the Tonga Media Council attempted to keep the election issue-focused by hosting weekly candidate forums. The Democratic Party of the Friendly Islands (PTOA), formed shortly before the election and led by veteran politician and reformist ʻAkilisi Pōhiva, was the major contesting party. The PTOA, along with all other parties, lacked a clear manifesto and policies. The other three parties that participated had a very limited presence during the campaign. Most candidates ultimately ran as independents.

The PTOA won 12 of the people's seats, two short of a parliamentary majority, and independents secured five. Independents received a combined share of 67% of the popular vote, while the PTOA garnered 28%. None of the other parties won any seats and no women were elected. Over 90% of eligible electors voted in this election. Following the election, the PTOA nominated Pōhiva as its candidate for the parliamentary vote for prime minister, despite the party's deputy leader, Sitiveni Halapua, having been floated as its nominee during the campaign. Two independent people's MPs nominated Sialeʻataongo Tuʻivakanō, a nobles' representative. The Legislative Assembly voted for a prime minister on 21 December, which was won by Tuʻivakanō, who received 14 votes. Pōhiva received the support of 12 MPs and the PTOA became the de facto opposition. Tuʻivakanō was sworn in the following day, succeeding Feleti Sevele, and his cabinet was inaugurated on 4 January 2011.

== Background ==
=== Democratisation ===
Ever since the adoption of Tonga's constitution in 1875, only a minority of members of the Legislative Assembly were elected by commoners. The other representatives were either elected by the nobility or were privy councillors serving as ex officio members whom the monarch appointed. Cabinet comprised the privy councillors, the governors of the administrative divisions, and any other individuals of the monarch's choosing. The monarch wielded executive power and appointed the prime minister and the rest of cabinet without needing to consult the Legislative Assembly. As a result, elections had little impact on government formation.

The pro-democracy movement gained much public support during the reign of King Tāufaʻāhau Tupou IV, with the formation of an ad hoc entity of the same name in 1989, associated with MP ‘Akilisi Pōhiva. Due to Tupou IV's opposition to the reforms, it was not until his son George Tupou V ascended to the throne in 2006 that the movement's efforts gained traction. Tupou V supported reforms, promising to observe Westminster conventions and, when acting as regent shortly before his father's death, appointed commoner and reformist Feleti Sevele as prime minister. Disputes around what form democratisation would take, however, subsequently emerged. Negotiations between reformists and the government were further complicated by the former reportedly altering their proposals numerous times. During a negotiation between Sevele and Pōhiva in November 2006, riots broke out in Nukuʻalofa, destroying much of the central business district, including a supermarket owned by Sevele and many Chinese-owned businesses. Rioters also struck the building hosting the prime minister's office. While the riots were reportedly attributed to the pressing demands for immediate democratisation by five reformist politicians, the individuals who planned and facilitated the destruction remained unclear. Five reformist members of parliament were subsequently charged with sedition. Despite the riots, the monarch announced that reforms would proceed.

A Royal Commission on reform was established in 2008 and was tasked with formulating recommendations for democratisation. Because a general election was scheduled to occur that year, democratisation would not take effect until 2010, to allow the government sufficient time to compose the framework of the reforms. Parliament accepted 18 of the commission's 82 recommendations and approved a further 45 with modifications. The new system saw the increase of the people's from nine to 17, allowing commoners to elect a majority of the legislature, while the nobles' seats remained at nine. The monarch, while retaining legislative veto power, would be required to appoint a prime minister elected by the Legislative Assembly, and, in turn, select cabinet ministers on the prime minister's recommendation. During the reform process, the people's representatives largely abstained from participating, reportedly for unclear reasons. As such, when the redrafted reforms were voted on in parliament in April 2010, the MPs who approved were mostly cabinet ministers and the nobles' representatives.

=== 2008 general election ===
The 2008 general election was the last poll held before the reforms came into effect. Unlike previous elections, however, where debate centred on whether democratisation should be introduced, the primary issue in the 2008 poll was what form the reforms ought to take and when they should be implemented. Weeks before the election, the Tonga Broadcasting Commission (TBC) announced it would not publish any political stories, stating that its staff did not have the necessary training. In addition, the TBC also disclosed that it would censor candidates' political broadcasts. The decisions sparked domestic and international criticism, including from the information minister, Afuʻalo Matoto, who said it was "damaging to Tonga's image overseas". Six of the people's seats were won by reformists who were facing sedition charges. The Human Rights and Democracy Movement (HRDM) secured four people's seats; two went to the People's Democratic Party (PDP); and independents won the other three.

== Electoral system ==
With the introduction of democratic reforms, the 17 people's seats were elected from single-member constituencies, replacing the multi-member districts. Ten constituencies were allocated to Tongatapu, three for Vava‘u, Ha‘apai, while ʻEua and the Niuas each had one. Voting for the nobles' seats remained unchanged, with the 33 heads of the noble families electing representatives from multi-member constituencies. The nobles vote in the constituency to which their title is attached, thus individuals with multiple titles may exercise plural votes. Voting was held using the first-past-the-post-voting system. The reforms also allowed the prime minister to advise the monarch to appoint up to four individuals to cabinet who were not elected to parliament. These ministers would then become ex officio members of the Legislative Assembly. The parliamentary term was extended from three to four years, with the monarch still having the power to call a snap election.

Candidates and voters were required to be at least 21 years old and hold Tongan citizenship. Ineligible voters included those who had served a prison sentence of at least two years and individuals convicted of a criminal offence. To qualify, candidates were required to be eligible voters and present in Tonga for at least a three-month period within six months before an election. Candidates running for a people's seat also required the signatures of at least 50 qualified electors from the constituency they contest and a deposit to be paid. Individuals subject to legal action for outstanding debt were ineligible to be contestants. Candidates for the people's seats were also required to undergo a legal clearance to qualify. The nobles, however, were exempt from this procedure. A total of 42,395 individuals were registered to vote in this election.

== Candidates and campaign ==
A total of 144 individuals contested the election, including 11 women. The PTOA party, which was formed before the election and led by veteran MP ‘Akilisi Pōhiva, fielded a candidate in all of the people's constituencies and emerged as the major party. The Sustainable Nation-Building Party, the People's Democratic Party and the Tongan Democratic Labor Party also contested the election. All nine incumbent people's representatives stood for re-election, including five cabinet ministers; however, only three did so as PTOA candidates. Most candidates ran as independents.

Despite the presence of political parties, most candidates campaigned as individuals, primarily relying on their personal records and local networks. The Tonga Media Council hosted weekly evening forums for two months before the election to encourage candidates to focus on election issues. Each week, the forum invited different panels of contestants to participate, with the issue theme changing every week. The forums were broadcast, with candidate panels answering queries from the public and a media panel. None of the contesting parties published a clear manifesto or had any decisive policies. PTOA Leader Pōhiva, relying on his tactics used in previous elections, campaigned on the themes of economic development and political reform. The electoral appeal of most PTOA candidates rested on their association with Pōhiva. The other three contesting parties were mostly invisible during the campaign, while the PTOA was the only one established with the objective of forming a government. Deputy Leader Sitiveni Halapua was widely considered to be the party's presumptive nominee for prime minister.

== Conduct ==
The Tonga Electoral Commission (TEC) was established after the reforms were passed, assuming the role of elections authority previously held by the prime minister's department. The TEC conducted a voter registration drive that required all electors to re-enrol. Unlike in previous elections, all voters were provided an electronic identity card to minimise confusion over enrollments, as had been the case in past years. King Tupou V dissolved the Legislative Assembly and called a snap election on 30 September, bringing forward the polls that were originally planned to take place in 2011, and issued the election writ on the same day. Candidate nominations were open from 21 to 22 October, while voter registration closed on 4 November. Delegations from Australia and New Zealand were present in Tonga to observe the elections. On election day, polling for the people's representatives commenced at 9:00 and concluded at 16:00. Voting for the nobles was held at the palace office in Nukuʻalofa and was open from 10:00 to 11:00. The observers stated that the election was "well conducted and completely transparent".

== Results ==
The PTOA won 12 of the people's seats, two short of an outright majority, and secured nine of the ten constituencies on Tongatapu. Independent candidates won the other five people's seats. Despite capturing most of the people's constituencies, the PTOA only received 28% of the popular vote, while independents dominated with a combined vote share of 67%. The PTOA was also the only party secure any seats. Two of the successful noble candidates were newcomers. None of the female candidates won a seat, while voter turnout exceeded 90%.

| Party | Votes | % | Seats | +/– |
|---|---|---|---|---|
| Democratic Party of the Friendly Islands | 10,953 | 28.49 | 12 | New |
| People's Democratic Party | 934 | 2.43 | 0 | –2 |
| Sustainable Nation-Building Party | 519 | 1.35 | 0 | New |
| Tongan Democratic Labor Party | 168 | 0.44 | 0 | New |
| Independents | 25,873 | 67.30 | 5 | +2 |
| Nobles' representatives | | | 9 | 0 |
| Total | 38,447 | 100.00 | 26 | –4 |
| Valid votes | 38,447 | 99.83 | | |
| Invalid/blank votes | 66 | 0.17 | | |
| Total votes | 38,513 | 100.00 | | |
| Registered voters/turnout | 42,395 | 90.84 | | |
Source: IFES

=== People's representatives ===
| Constituency | Candidate | Votes | % | Notes |
|---|---|---|---|---|
| Tongatapu 1 | ʻAkilisi Pōhiva | 1,657 | 62.5 | Elected |
| Tongatapu 1 | Taniela Talifolau Palu | 567 | 21.4 | |
| Tongatapu 1 | Poutele Kaho Tu’ihalamaka | 270 | 10.2 | |
| Tongatapu 1 | 'Inoke Fotu Hu’akau | 105 | 4.0 | |
| Tongatapu 1 | 'Eliesa Fifita | 38 | 1.4 | |
| Tongatapu 1 | Siosifa Moala Taumoepeau | 13 | 0.5 | |
| Tongatapu 2 | Semisi Sika | 849 | 37.9 | Elected |
| Tongatapu 2 | Viliami Tangi | 641 | 28.6 | |
| Tongatapu 2 | Malia Viviena 'Alisi Numia Taumoepeau | 306 | 13.7 | |
| Tongatapu 2 | Sione Tu’itavake Fonua | 181 | 8.1 | |
| Tongatapu 2 | Siale 'Ataongo Puloka | 111 | 5.0 | |
| Tongatapu 2 | Mele Teusivi 'Amanaki | 65 | 2.9 | |
| Tongatapu 2 | Tevita Kaitu’u Fotu | 49 | 2.2 | |
| Tongatapu 2 | Sitafooti 'Aho | 26 | 1.2 | |
| Tongatapu 2 | Semisi 'Ulu’ave Mila | 12 | 0.5 | |
| Tongatapu 3 | Sitiveni Halapua | 1,047 | 38.5 | Elected |
| Tongatapu 3 | Clive Edwards | 681 | 25.0 | |
| Tongatapu 3 | Viliami Takau | 289 | 10.6 | |
| Tongatapu 3 | Penisimani Vea | 257 | 9.4 | |
| Tongatapu 3 | David Kaveinga Vaka | 191 | 7.0 | |
| Tongatapu 3 | Betty Blake | 103 | 3.8 | |
| Tongatapu 3 | Sione 'Uhilamoelangi Liava’a | 83 | 3.1 | |
| Tongatapu 3 | Falakiko Karl Taufaeteau | 35 | 1.3 | |
| Tongatapu 3 | Pesalili Kailahi | 23 | 0.8 | |
| Tongatapu 3 | Semisi Nauto Tuapasi 'Ata’ata | 12 | 0.4 | |
| Tongatapu 4 | ʻIsileli Pulu | 1,274 | 58.3 | Elected |
| Tongatapu 4 | 'Etika Koka | 302 | 13.8 | |
| Tongatapu 4 | 'Ahongalu Fusimalohi | 223 | 10.2 | |
| Tongatapu 4 | 'Etuate 'Eniti Sakalia | 215 | 9.8 | |
| Tongatapu 4 | Tupou M. Loto’aniu | 74 | 3.4 | |
| Tongatapu 4 | Mele Tonga Savea Linda Ma’u | 71 | 3.2 | |
| Tongatapu 4 | Christopher Mafi | 24 | 1.1 | |
| Tongatapu 5 | ʻAisake Eke | 679 | 24.1 | Elected |
| Tongatapu 5 | Maliu Moeao Takai | 616 | 21.9 | |
| Tongatapu 5 | Siale Napa’a Fihaki | 302 | 10.7 | |
| Tongatapu 5 | Hekisou Fifita | 285 | 10.1 | |
| Tongatapu 5 | Sione V. Loseli | 238 | 8.5 | |
| Tongatapu 5 | Semisi Tongia | 233 | 8.3 | |
| Tongatapu 5 | Lopeti Senituli | 155 | 5.5 | |
| Tongatapu 5 | Sione Tu’alau Mangisi | 116 | 4.1 | |
| Tongatapu 5 | Sione Langi Vailanu | 98 | 3.5 | |
| Tongatapu 5 | Sitiveni Takaetali Finau | 46 | 1.6 | |
| Tongatapu 5 | 'Ofa Tautuiaki | 24 | 0.9 | |
| Tongatapu 5 | Pita Ikata’ane Finaulahi | 19 | 0.7 | |
| Tongatapu 5 | Sateki Finau | 4 | 0.1 | |
| Tongatapu 6 | Siosifa Tuʻitupou Tuʻutafaiva | 735 | 26.5 | Elected |
| Tongatapu 6 | Siosaia Moehau | 731 | 26.4 | |
| Tongatapu 6 | Posesi Fanua Bloomfield | 389 | 14.0 | |
| Tongatapu 6 | Sione Fifita Maumau | 279 | 10.1 | |
| Tongatapu 6 | Viliami Moimoi Vaea | 169 | 6.1 | |
| Tongatapu 6 | Siosiua Holitei Fonua | 163 | 5.9 | |
| Tongatapu 6 | Lesieli Hu’availiku Niu | 61 | 2.2 | |
| Tongatapu 6 | Melino He Mapu’atonga Tangi | 50 | 1.8 | |
| Tongatapu 6 | Sione Tu’alau Vimahi | 47 | 1.7 | |
| Tongatapu 6 | Hemaloto Tatafu | 40 | 1.4 | |
| Tongatapu 6 | Sitiveni Finau | 30 | 1.1 | |
| Tongatapu 6 | Sepeti Vakameilalo | 24 | 0.9 | |
| Tongatapu 6 | Fale’aisi Vaea Tangitau | 18 | 0.7 | |
| Tongatapu 6 | Latu Timote Tu’i’asoa | 17 | 0.6 | |
| Tongatapu 6 | 'Ofakitokelau Fakalata | 16 | 0.6 | |
| Tongatapu 7 | Sione Sangster Saulala | 847 | 32.6 | Elected |
| Tongatapu 7 | Giulio Masasso Tu’ikolongahau Paunga | 621 | 23.9 | |
| Tongatapu 7 | Sione Vuna Fa’otusia | 429 | 16.5 | |
| Tongatapu 7 | Mavaetangi Manavahetau | 240 | 9.2 | |
| Tongatapu 7 | Siosifa Filini Sikuea | 160 | 6.2 | |
| Tongatapu 7 | Peato Tauholoaki Takai | 117 | 4.5 | |
| Tongatapu 7 | 'Anau Ki Lifuka 'Anau | 89 | 3.4 | |
| Tongatapu 7 | 'Amanaki Paea Molitika | 59 | 2.3 | |
| Tongatapu 7 | Finau Lea’aetalafo’ou | 23 | 0.9 | |
| Tongatapu 7 | Hoatatau Tenisi | 15 | 0.6 | |
| Tongatapu 8 | Sione Taione | 901 | 34.1 | Elected |
| Tongatapu 8 | Lui 'Aho | 770 | 29.1 | |
| Tongatapu 8 | Fataimoemanu Lafaele Vaihu | 474 | 17.9 | |
| Tongatapu 8 | Siaosi 'Etika Moleni | 177 | 6.7 | |
| Tongatapu 8 | Sioape Tu’iono | 118 | 4.5 | |
| Tongatapu 8 | Mosese Senituli Manu | 83 | 3.1 | |
| Tongatapu 8 | Simote Po’uliva’ati | 66 | 2.5 | |
| Tongatapu 8 | Simione Kau Silapelu | 32 | 1.2 | |
| Tongatapu 8 | Nakita Talanoa | 20 | 0.8 | |
| Tongatapu 8 | Solo Fefioloi Solomone La’akulu | 5 | 0.2 | |
| Tongatapu 9 | Kaveinga Faʻanunu | 908 | 34.0 | Elected |
| Tongatapu 9 | Sevenitini Toumo’ua | 414 | 15.5 | |
| Tongatapu 9 | Viliami Fukofuka | 262 | 9.8 | |
| Tongatapu 9 | Filimone Fifita | 241 | 9.0 | |
| Tongatapu 9 | 'Aisake 'Etimoni Tu’iono | 229 | 8.6 | |
| Tongatapu 9 | Siaosi 'Enosi Tu’ipulotu | 147 | 5.5 | |
| Tongatapu 9 | Semisi Kailahi | 136 | 5.1 | |
| Tongatapu 9 | Tonga Tongilava Lemoto | 110 | 4.1 | |
| Tongatapu 9 | 'Epeli Taufa Kalemani | 51 | 1.9 | |
| Tongatapu 9 | Konisitutone Simana Kami | 50 | 1.9 | |
| Tongatapu 9 | Falati Papani | 49 | 1.8 | |
| Tongatapu 9 | Mosese Latu | 22 | 0.8 | |
| Tongatapu 9 | Sione 'Umeahola Faeamani | 21 | 0.8 | |
| Tongatapu 9 | 'Ofa Fatai | 18 | 0.7 | |
| Tongatapu 9 | Samisoni Lotaki Kanongata’a | 15 | 0.6 | |
| Tongatapu 10 | Semisi Tapueluelu | 792 | 26.6 | Elected |
| Tongatapu 10 | Pohiva Tuʻiʻonetoa | 613 | 20.6 | |
| Tongatapu 10 | Faka’osilea Kaufusi | 608 | 20.5 | |
| Tongatapu 10 | Faka’osi 'Akapulu Maama | 277 | 9.3 | |
| Tongatapu 10 | Semisi Kaifoto Pale | 170 | 5.7 | |
| Tongatapu 10 | Daniel Kimball Fale | 109 | 3.7 | |
| Tongatapu 10 | ZCO Ongosia 'Uhatafe | 104 | 3.5 | |
| Tongatapu 10 | Soane Vaka’uta Melekiola | 77 | 2.6 | |
| Tongatapu 10 | Fifita Sili | 71 | 2.4 | |
| Tongatapu 10 | Latanoa Pikula | 64 | 2.2 | |
| Tongatapu 10 | Kitione Pomaama | 61 | 2.1 | |
| Tongatapu 10 | Malia Peata Sioko Noa | 27 | 0.9 | |
| ʻEua 11 | Sunia Fili | 772 | 37.2 | Elected |
| ʻEua 11 | Sione Sengililala Moala | 667 | 32.1 | |
| ʻEua 11 | Tevita Lavemaau | 637 | 30.7 | |
| Haʻapai 12 | Moʻale Finau | 470 | 31.9 | Elected |
| Haʻapai 12 | Viliami Hingano | 306 | 20.8 | |
| Haʻapai 12 | Paula Vi | 280 | 19.0 | |
| Haʻapai 12 | Latiume Kaufusi | 174 | 11.8 | |
| Haʻapai 12 | Tevita 'Ova | 71 | 4.8 | |
| Haʻapai 12 | Mosese Moimoi Fakahua | 70 | 4.8 | |
| Haʻapai 12 | Sione Tu’itupou Fotu | 39 | 2.6 | |
| Haʻapai 12 | Sione Fekau Mafile’o | 38 | 2.6 | |
| Haʻapai 12 | Langilangi Vimahi | 16 | 1.1 | |
| Haʻapai 12 | Penisimani Tavalu Fatafehi | 8 | 0.5 | |
| Haʻapai 13 | ʻUliti Uata | 1,090 | 70.5 | Elected |
| Haʻapai 13 | Sione Teisina Fuko | 253 | 16.4 | |
| Haʻapai 13 | Lopeti Kamipeli Tofa | 204 | 13.2 | |
| Vavaʻu 14 | Lisiate ʻAkolo | 665 | 28.0 | Elected |
| Vavaʻu 14 | ʻEtuate Lavulavu | 540 | 22.7 | |
| Vavaʻu 14 | Paula Piveni Piukala | 502 | 21.1 | |
| Vavaʻu 14 | Tu’amelie He Lotu Faaitu’a Kemoe’atu | 380 | 16.0 | |
| Vavaʻu 14 | Peauafi Pifeleti | 209 | 8.8 | |
| Vavaʻu 14 | Siale Fifita | 51 | 2.1 | |
| Vavaʻu 14 | Pita Vi Hala’api’api | 32 | 1.3 | |
| Vavaʻu 15 | Samiu Vaipulu | 618 | 33.1 | Elected |
| Vavaʻu 15 | Ualingi Salesi Paea | 362 | 19.4 | |
| Vavaʻu 15 | Keuli Pasina Lavaki | 305 | 16.3 | |
| Vavaʻu 15 | Viliami Kaufusi Helu | 235 | 12.6 | |
| Vavaʻu 15 | Semisi Lavaka | 208 | 11.1 | |
| Vavaʻu 15 | Viliami Pasikala | 138 | 7.4 | |
| Vavaʻu 16 | Viliami Latu | 881 | 43.7 | Elected |
| Vavaʻu 16 | Tevita Hala Palefau | 347 | 17.2 | |
| Vavaʻu 16 | Tevita Kaafi Tukofuka | 298 | 14.8 | |
| Vavaʻu 16 | 'Aisea Silivenusi | 289 | 14.3 | |
| Vavaʻu 16 | 'Atalasa Misilemoti Pouvalu | 203 | 10.1 | |
| Ongo Niua 17 | Sosefo Feʻaomoeata Vakata | 383 | 46.8 | Elected |
| Ongo Niua 17 | Sione Feingatau ʻIloa | 228 | 27.8 | |
| Ongo Niua 17 | Petelo Taukei Fuaevalu 'Ahomana | 208 | 25.4 | |
Source: Matangi Tonga

=== Nobles ===
| Constituency | Elected candidate | Votes |
|---|---|---|
| ʻEua | Lord Lasike | 6 |
| Haʻapai | Lord Fakafānua | 4 |
| Haʻapai | Lord Tuʻihaʻateiho | 4 |
| Niuas | Lord Fusituʻa | 1 |
| Tongatapu | Lord Tuʻivakanō | 13 |
| Tongatapu | Lord Maʻafu | 10 |
| Tongatapu | Lord Vaea | 8 |
| Vavaʻu | Lord Tuʻiʻafitu | 4 |
| Vavaʻu | Lord Tuʻilakepa | 4 |
Source: Matangi Tonga

== Aftermath ==
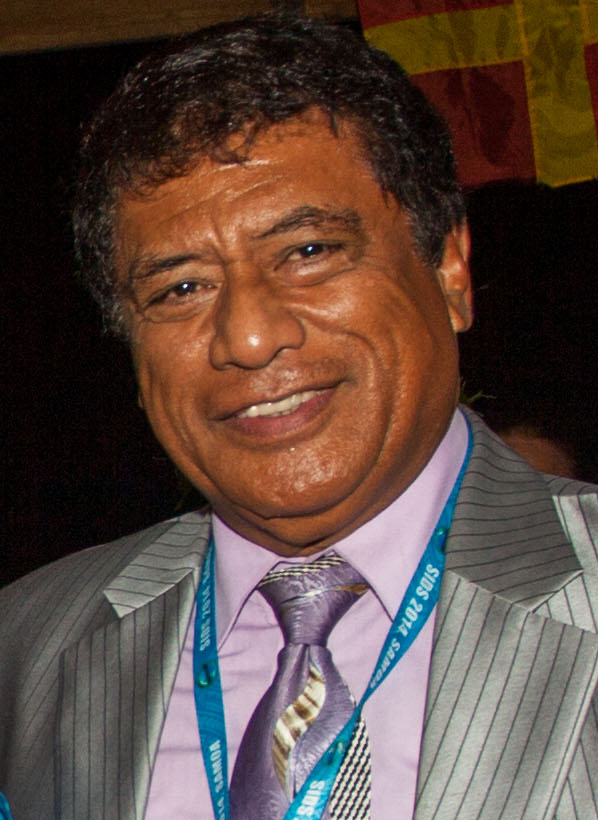
Sialeʻataongo Tuʻivakanō, a member of the nobility, was elected prime minister

The election was widely reported as a triumph for the PTOA and the reformists. The party needed to win over the independent people's representatives to form a government. Because the nobles operated as a unified bloc, the independent people's MPs held the balance of power. The monarch advised the nobles to refrain from nominating a member of their bloc to contest the parliamentary vote for prime minister to ensure the people's representatives would lead the government formation. Despite Deputy Leader Halapua being touted as a candidate for prime minister during the campaign, mainly due to his more favourable reputation with the nobles, the PTOA instead nominated Pōhiva. Two of the independent people's representatives nominated noble MP Sialeʻataongo Tuʻivakanō. Pōhiva hosted public rallies in an attempt to convince the independents to support him. The PTOA leader also sought to introduce a dynamic of bipolarity to parliament, that is, a government with an adversarial opposition, which reportedly alienated the nobles and some independent people's MPs who favoured greater unity and cooperation. As such, these MPs were not receptive to Pōhiva's call for a government of national unity, which they believed was a smoke screen. The PTOA gained the support of one independent, however, this was offset by another MP withdrawing support for the party.

The Legislative Assembly was initially scheduled to convene and vote for a prime minister on 20 December, but the meeting was deferred to the following day. The delay was due to the Lord Chamberlain, tasked with presenting the monarch with the prime ministerial election results, being unable to meet with him on the original day. The monarch, by law, is required to be the first informed of all secret ballot results, of which elections for prime minister are conducted. Tu‘ivanakō went on to defeat Pōhiva, receiving 14 votes, while the PTOA leader received 12. Tuʻivakanō was sworn in as prime minister on 22 December, and unveiled his cabinet on 31 December. The new prime minister included three nobles and six people's representatives in his cabinet, such as former Justice Minister Samiu Vaipulu who became deputy prime minister. Tuʻivakanō also chose two commoners from outside parliament: Clive Edwards, who lost his seat during the election, and ʻAna Taufeʻulungaki, who became education minister and the sole female member of parliament. Two PTOA members were appointed to cabinet, including Pōhiva who was to be health minister. He later declined to assume the role, however, expressing disappointment that the PTOA were not offered more roles in cabinet. The two PTOA members that did accept cabinet positions was Sione Sangster Saulala, who was expelled from the party shortly after taking office, and Siosifa Tuʻitupou Tuʻutafaiva, who subsequently left the PTOA. The party subsequently became the de facto opposition. Cabinet ministers assumed office on 4 January 2011, while members of the Legislative Assembly were sworn in on 14 January.
