= Sione Vuna Faʻotusia =

Tongan politician (1953-2021)

The Honourable Sione Vuna Faʻotusia
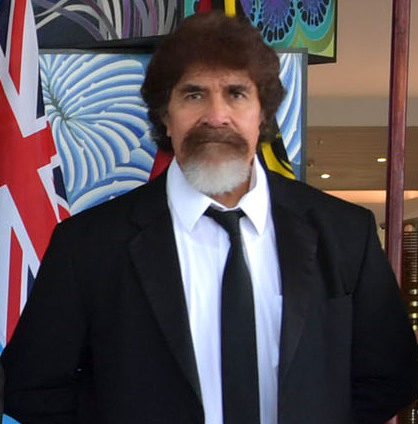
- Faʻotusia in 2020

Deputy Prime Minister of Tonga
- In office 10 October 2019 – 14 December 2020
- Prime Minister: Pōhiva Tuʻiʻonetoa
- Preceded by: Semisi Sika
- Succeeded by: Lord Maʻafu

Minister for Justice and Prisons
- In office 30 December 2014 – 14 December 2020
- Prime Minister: ʻAkilisi Pōhiva; Semisi Sika (Acting); Pōhiva Tuʻiʻonetoa
- Preceded by: Clive Edwards (Justice); Pōhiva Tuʻiʻonetoa (Prisons)
- Succeeded by: Samiu Vaipulu

Member of the Tongan Parliament for Tongatapu 7
- In office 27 November 2014 – 29 August 2021
- Preceded by: Sione Sangster Saulala
- Succeeded by: Sione Sangster Saulala

Personal details
- Born: 24 February 1953
- Died: 29 August 2021 (aged 68) Auckland, New Zealand
- Party: Democratic Party of the Friendly Islands; People's Party

Sione Vuna Faʻotusia (24 February 1953 – 29 August 2021) was a Tongan politician, Cabinet Minister, and Member of the Legislative Assembly of Tonga who served as the deputy prime minister of Tonga from 2019 to 2020.

== Personal life ==
Faʻotusia received a Bachelor of Laws from the University of New South Wales Faculty of Law, a Master's degree from the London School of Economics, and a Postgraduate Diploma in Legal Practice.

Prior to entering politics Faʻotusia was a member of the Tongan Public Servants Association and chair of its strike committee during the 2005 Tongan public service strike. From 2006 to 2008, he was Chief Executive Officer of the Ministry of Justice. He later moved to private practice. He was counsel to the Shipping Corporation of Polynesia Ltd, owners of the MV Princess Ashika.

In January 2019 Faʻotusia was charged with wrongful interference with the course of justice and using threatening language in a dispute over a stolen cow. In December 2019 he was acquitted after a judge found there was insufficient evidence. An appeal by the crown saw the case return to the Supreme Court in December 2020.

Faʻotusia married for the first time after his 67th birthday. He died on 29 August 2021, in Auckland, New Zealand.

== Political career ==
Faʻotusia was elected as a Democratic Party of the Friendly Islands (DPFI) candidate at the 2014 Tongan general election and appointed as Minister of Justice in the cabinet of ʻAkilisi Pōhiva. He was re-elected in the 2017 Tongan general election and reappointed to Cabinet. As Justice Minister Fa'otusia appointed the first Tongan judge to the Supreme Court of Tonga in over a hundred years, and aims to have an all-Tongan Court by 2020. He has also publicly supported capital punishment.

Following the death of ʻAkilisi Pōhiva, Faʻotusia supported Pōhiva Tuʻiʻonetoa for Prime Minister, leaving the DPFI to join Tuʻiʻonetoa's new People's Party. He was appointed to Tuʻiʻonetoa's Cabinet as Deputy Prime Minister and Minister for Justice and Prisons.

In December 2020 he joined other PTOA members in signing a motion of no confidence against Prime Minister Tuʻiʻonetoa. He subsequently resigned as a Minister.
