= Tevita Hala Palefau =

Member of the Legislative Assembly of Tonga

Minister for Education, Women's Affairs and Culture
- In office 25 January 2005 – 2010
- Preceded by: Paul Bloomfield
- Succeeded by: ʻAna Taufeʻulungaki

Tevita Hala Palefau (born ~1958) is a former Tongan politician and Cabinet Minister.

Palefu began his career as a teacher at Mailefihi Siu'ilikutapu College in Vava'u in 1979. He graduated with a Bachelor of Science from the University of the South Pacific in Fiji in 1985, and completed a Masters of Science at the University of Technology in Perth, Australia in 1993. He later completed a PhD at the University of Toronto in Canada. From 1996 to 1997 he was principal of Taufa'ahau Pilolevu College in Ha'apai, and he was principal of Tupou College from 1997 to 2000. In 1998 he was ordained a Methodist Minister.

On January 25, 2005 he was appointed Minister for Education, Women's Affairs and Culture.

He contested the seat of Vava'u 16 in the 2010 election but was unsuccessful. He subsequently worked as Vice President of Education at the Free Wesleyan Church of Tonga.

== Honours ==
National honours

- Order of Queen Sālote Tupou III, Grand Cross (31 July 2008).
