= Sione Tupou Mateialona =

Prime Minister of Tonga from 1905 to 1912

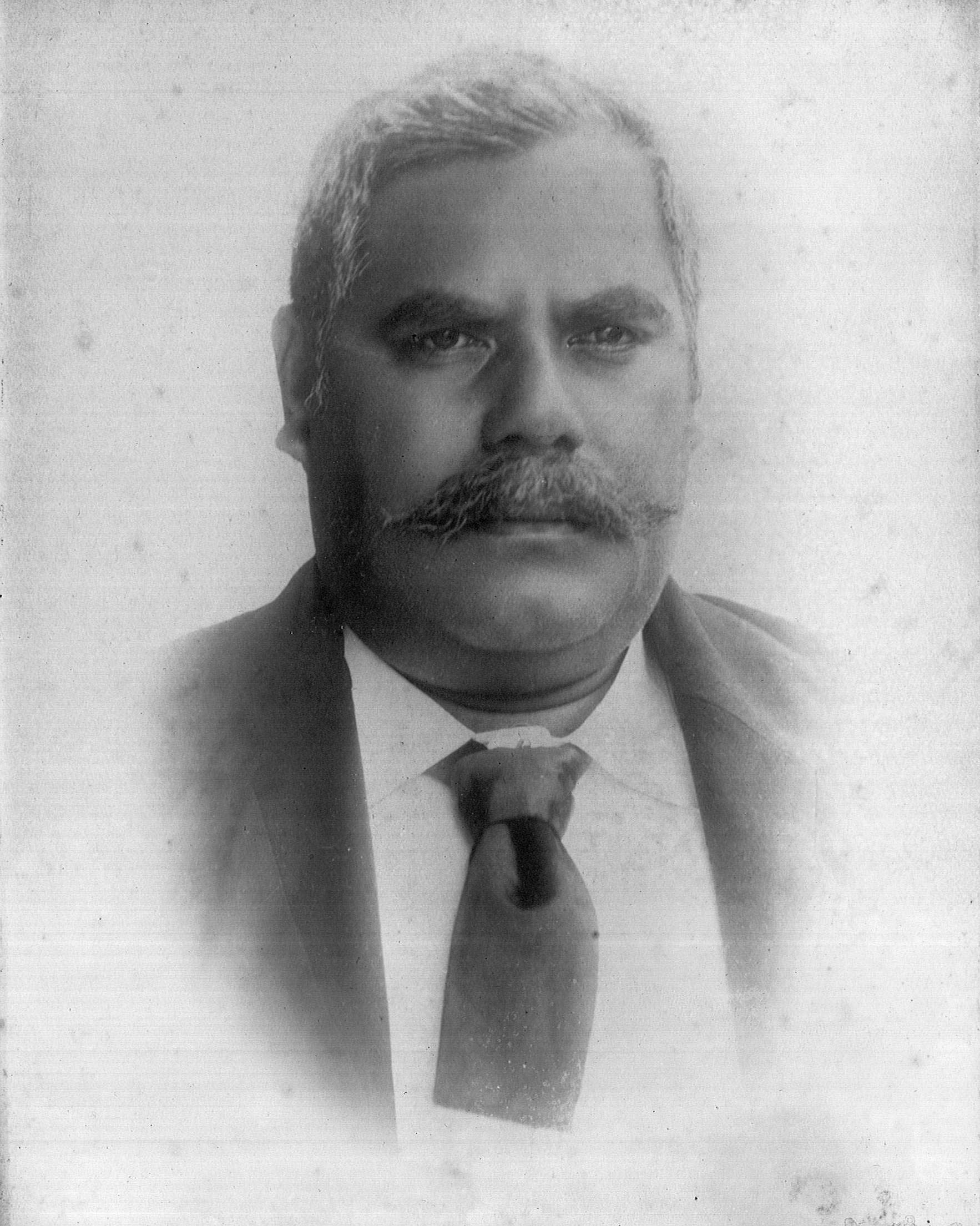

Prime Minister of Tonga
- In office January 1905 – 30 September 1912
- Monarch: George Tupou II
- Preceded by: Siaosi Tuʻi Pelehake
- Succeeded by: Tevita Tuʻivakano

Sione Mateialona Tupou was a politician from Tonga who served as Prime Minister of Tonga from January 1905 to 30 September 1912.

He was a grandson of George Tupou I through one of the king's son ʻIsileli Tupou.
