= Sustainable Nation-Building Party =

- Leader: Sione Fonua
- Founded: 4 August 2007
- Dissolved: 2017

The Sustainable Nation-Building Party (Tongan: Paati Langafonua Tuʻuloa) was a political party in Tonga. It was launched on August 4, 2007, in Auckland, New Zealand. It was later launched in Tonga itself on August 18, 2007.

The party's president was Sione Fonua, an Auckland-based lawyer. He planned to move to Tonga before the 2008 elections, but did not aim to contest an election until 2010.

The party ran four candidates in the 2010 elections, but did not win any seats. It intended to recruit more members and candidates and contest the following elections in 2014.

Whilst active the party ran on a vague platform, advocating caution regarding reforms, good governance and economic development; though it did not have a manifesto to explain what it meant by these ideals. The party did not run any candidates at the 2017 election, and is now defunct.
