= Siale ʻAkauʻola =

Tongan politician

Minister for Health
- Incumbent
- Assumed office 31 January 2024
- Prime Minister: Siaosi Sovaleni

Personal details
- Party: none

Siale ‘Akau’ola is a Tongan civil servant and Cabinet Minister.

‘Akau’ola was educated at the University of Papua New Guinea. He worked for Tonga's Ministry of Health for 37 years. He was appointed chief executive in 2009, and reappointed repeatedly until his retirement in 2023.

In January 2024 he was appointed minister of health in the cabinet of Siaosi Sovaleni, replacing Saia Piukala who had taken an appointment with the WHO.
