= Malupo =

Malupo is a given name and surname. Notable people with the name include:

- Malupo Kaufusi (born 1979), Tongan rugby league player
- Mateo Malupo (born 1988), Tongan rugby union player
