= Viliami Tangi =

Tongan politician

Deputy Prime Minister of Tonga
- In office May 2006 – 4 January 2011
- Prime Minister: Feleti Sevele
- Preceded by: James Cocker
- Succeeded by: Samiu Vaipulu

Minister of Health
- In office 1 March 1999 – 4 January 2011
- Prime Minister: Baron Vaea ʻAhoʻeitu ʻUnuakiʻotonga Tukuʻaho; Feleti Sevele
- Succeeded by: ʻAkilisi Pōhiva

Viliami Ta’u Tangi, styled Lord Tangi of Vaonukonuka, is a Tongan politician and former Cabinet Minister. He has previously served as Deputy Prime Minister and Minister of Health.

== Biography ==
Tangi is from Vavaʻu. He trained as a medical doctor at the Fiji School of Medicine, then entered the civil service as a medical officer. After completing surgical training overseas he became the second Tongan national admitted to the Royal Australasian College of Surgeons. He worked as Chief Surgeon in Vaiola Hospital, Nuku'alofa, before moving to Australia. He returned to Tonga after being appointed as Minister of Health in 1999. As a Minister, he sat in the Tongan Parliament, but was not an elected representative. In 2003 he was elected to the WHO Executive Board.

Following democratic reforms in 2010, Tangi contested the 2010 election, but failed to win a seat. On 30 December 2010, he was appointed a Tongan life peer by King George Tupou V as Lord Tangi of Vaonukonuka.

Following the 2021 Tongan general election, he was appointed interim Speaker.

== Honours ==
National honours

- Order of Queen Sālote Tupou III, Knight Grand Cross with Collar (31 July 2008).
