= ʻAkilisi Pōhiva =

Tongan politician (1941–2019)

The Honourable ʻAkilisi Pōhiva
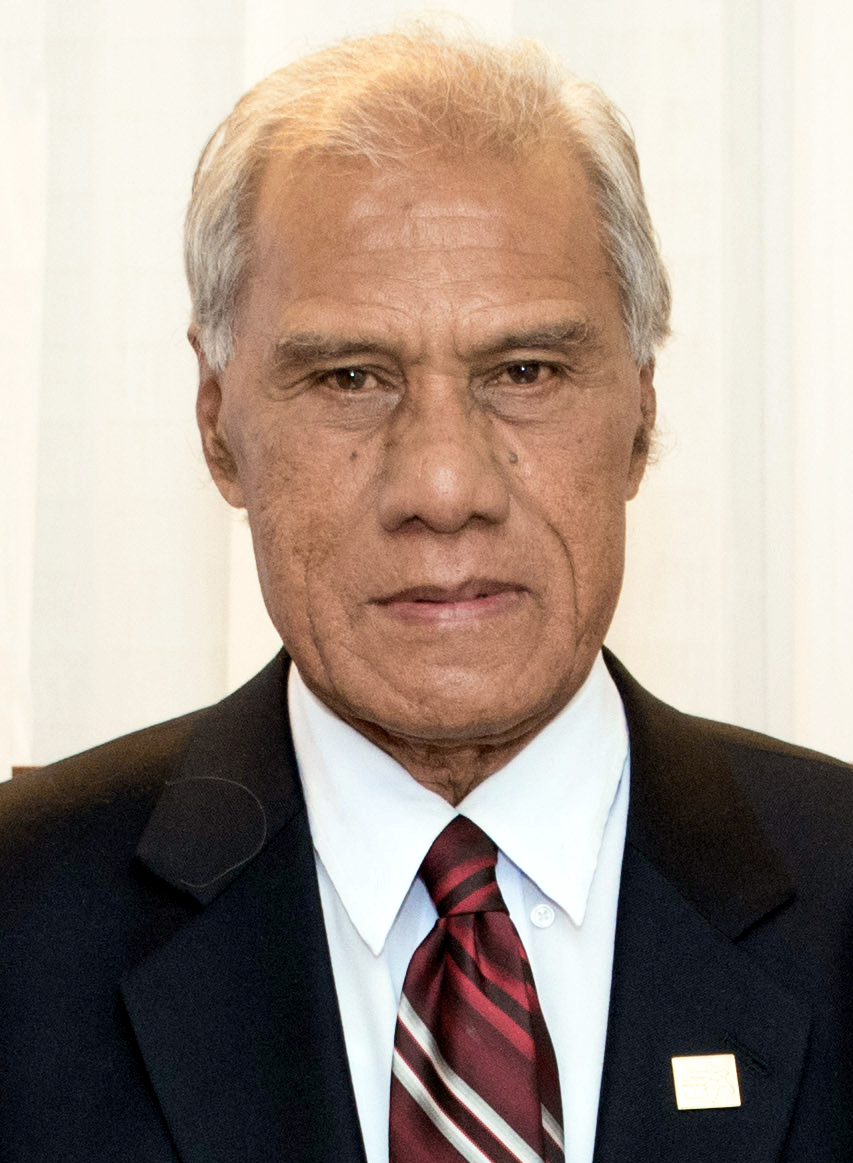
- Pōhiva in 2016

Prime Minister of Tonga
- In office 30 December 2014 – 12 September 2019
- Monarch: Tupou VI
- Deputy: Siaosi Sovaleni; Maʻafu Tukuiʻaulahi; Sēmisi Sika
- Preceded by: Sialeʻataongo Tuʻivakanō
- Succeeded by: Sēmisi Sika (acting)

Minister of Foreign Affairs
- In office 20 January 2018 – 12 September 2019
- Preceded by: Siaosi Sovaleni
- Succeeded by: Semisi Sika (Acting)

Minister of Health
- In office 4 January 2011 – 13 January 2011
- Prime Minister: Sialeʻataongo Tuʻivakanō
- Preceded by: Viliami Tangi
- Succeeded by: ‘Uliti Uata

Member of the Tongan Parliament for Tongatapu 1
- In office 26 November 2010 – 12 September 2019
- Preceded by: Constituency established
- Succeeded by: Siaosi Pōhiva

Personal details
- Born: Samiuela ʻAkilisi Pōhiva; 7 April 1941 Fakakakai, Haʻapai, Tonga
- Died: 12 September 2019 (aged 78) Auckland, New Zealand
- Party: Democratic Party of the Friendly Islands
- Other political affiliations: Human Rights and Democracy Movement (before 2010)
- Spouse: Neomai Tuitupou Pōhiva (died 2018)
- Education: University of the South Pacific

Samiuela ʻAkilisi Pōhiva (7 April 1941 – 12 September 2019) was a Tongan pro-democracy activist and politician. A key leader of the Democratic Party of the Friendly Islands (DPFI), he served as the Prime Minister of Tonga from 2014 to his death in 2019. He was only the fourth commoner to serve as Prime Minister (after Shirley Baker in the 1880s, Siosateki Tonga in the 1890s and Feleti Sevele in the 2000s), and the first commoner to be elected to that position by Parliament rather than appointed by the King.

== Early career ==
Pōhiva worked as a teacher and later studied at the University of the South Pacific before joining the Tongan Teacher Training Staff. He became active in Tonga's pro-democracy movement in the 1980s, and in 1981 he co-founded their monthly radio programme, "Matalafo Laukai". In 1984, he was dismissed from the civil service as punishment for his criticism of the government; he subsequently sued them successfully for unfair dismissal. He then founded the democracy movement's monthly newsletter, Keleʻa, in 1986.

== Political career ==
Pōhiva was the longest-serving people's representative in the Tongan Parliament, having first been elected in 1987. His political career was marked by constant battles with the Tongan monarchy over democracy, transparency and corruption. In 1996 he was imprisoned for contempt of Parliament on the order of the Legislative Assembly for reporting on Parliament's proceedings. He was subsequently released after the Supreme Court ruled that the imprisonment was "unlawful and unconstitutional". In 2002 he was charged with sedition over an article published in his newspaper Keleʻa alleging the king had a secret fortune, but was acquitted by a jury.

On 18 January 2007, Pōhiva was arrested over his role in the 2006 Nukuʻalofa riots. He was subsequently charged with sedition. In the 2008 election he was re-elected for an eighth term as the No 1 Tongatapu People's Representative with 11,290 votes.

In September 2010, he established the Democratic Party of the Friendly Islands along with other Human Rights and Democracy Movement People's Representatives, in order to contest the 2010 elections. His party secured twelve of the seventeen seats for People's Representatives (the other five going to independent candidates, while representatives of the nobility held an additional nine seats). He announced his intention to stand for the position of Prime Minister. Following constitutional reforms, this would be the first time the Prime Minister was elected by Parliament, rather than appointed by the monarch. The election for the premiership was held on 21 December, between Pōhiva and nobles' representative Lord Tuʻivakanō. Pōhiva obtained twelve votes, but was defeated by Tuʻivakanō, who was elected with fourteen.

Following the election and selection of a Prime Minister he accepted a position in the new Cabinet, as Minister for Health. On 13 January, however, he resigned from Cabinet, in protest against the inclusion in Cabinet of members from outside Parliament (to positions which he stated could have been entrusted to members of his party), and also to express his refusal to sign an agreement which would have prevented him from voting (in Parliament) against measures endorsed by Cabinet, based on the principle of collective Cabinet responsibility. Although there is no formal Opposition, Pōhiva was, from then on, considered the de facto opposition leader.

In December 2013, Parliamentarians for Global Action presented him with their annual Defender of Democracy Award, in recognition of his three and a half decades of campaigning for greater democracy in Tonga. He was the first Pacific Islander to receive the award.

== Prime Minister (2014–2019) ==
The Democratic Party of the Friendly Islands won 9 of the 17 people's seats at the 2014 Tongan general election. Following the election, Pōhiva was elected Prime Minister, defeating Samiu Vaipulu by 15 votes to 11. He appointed a cabinet of commoners, with Maʻafu Tukuiʻaulahi as the only noble representative.

Pōhiva's government made a controversial decision to ratify the Convention on the Elimination of All Forms of Discrimination Against Women in early 2015, but later reversed the decision over concerns that it could lead to same-sex marriage and abortion. In February 2017 Pōhiva survived a no-confidence motion, with his noble opponents only able to muster 10 votes in favour, against 14 in support of the government. Finance Minister ʻAisake Eke abstained and was fired.

On 25 August 2017 King Tupou VI sacked Pōhiva and dissolved the Assembly and called fresh elections in the hope of getting a more tractable prime minister. The resulting 2017 Tongan general election was a landslide for the DPFI, and Pōhiva was re-elected to the premiership, defeating his former deputy Siaosi Sovaleni 14 votes to 12. His post-election cabinet included one minister from outside the legislative assembly, Dr Tevita Tuʻi Uata.

== Personal life and death ==
Pōhiva was married to Neomai Pōhiva (1948 – 2018). He died at Auckland City Hospital in New Zealand on 12 September 2019, from complications from pneumonia. His state funeral was held on 19 September in Nukuʻalofa.

== See also ==
- List of foreign ministers in 2017

Legislative Assembly of Tonga
Constituency Established	Member of Parliament for Tongatapu 1; 2010–2019	Succeeded by Siaosi Pōhiva
Political offices
Preceded by Viliami Tangi	Minister of Health; 2011	Succeeded by ‘Uliti Uata
Preceded by Sialeʻataongo Tuʻivakanō	Prime Minister of Tonga; 2014–2019	Succeeded by Sēmisi Sika as Acting prime minister
Preceded by Sialeʻataongo Tuʻivakanō	Minister of Foreign Affairs; 2014–2017	Succeeded by Siaosi Sovaleni
Preceded by Siaosi Sovaleni	Minister of Foreign Affairs; 2017–2019	Succeeded by Sēmisi Sika as Acting minister
Party political offices
New political party	Leader of the Democratic Party of the Friendly Islands; 2010–2019	Succeeded by Sēmisi Sika
