= Samiu Vaipulu =

Tongan politician (born 1952)

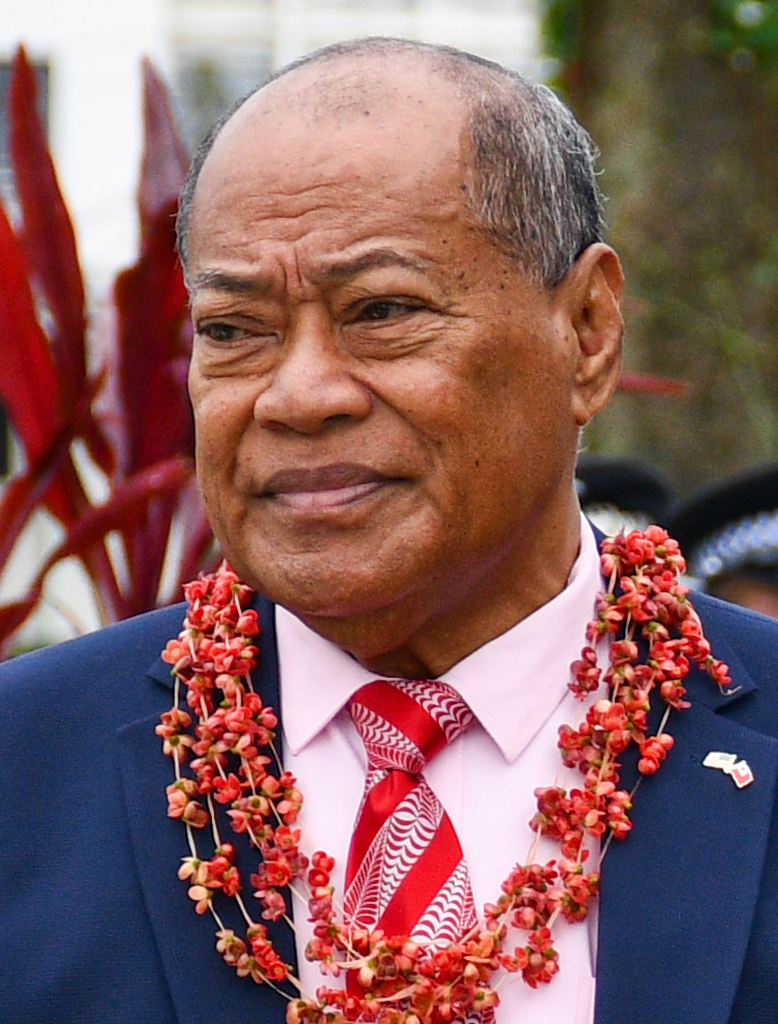
- Vaipulu in 2023

Acting Prime Minister of Tonga
- In office 9 December 2024 – 22 January 2025
- Monarch: Tupou VI
- Preceded by: Siaosi Sovaleni
- Succeeded by: ʻAisake Eke

Minister for Justice and Prisons
- In office 25 January 2021 – 28 January 2025
- Prime Minister: Pohiva Tuʻiʻonetoa; Siaosi Sovaleni ʻAisake Eke
- Preceded by: Sione Vuna Fa'otusia
- Succeeded by: ʻAisake Eke (Prisons); Moʻale Finau (Justice)

Minister for Trade and Economic Development
- In office 10 October 2019 – 25 January 2021
- Prime Minister: Pohiva Tuʻiʻonetoa
- Preceded by: Tevita Tu'i Uata
- Succeeded by: Tatafu Moeaki

Deputy Prime Minister of Tonga
- In office 5 January 2011 – 30 December 2014
- Prime Minister: Sialeʻataongo Tuʻivakanō
- Preceded by: Viliami Tangi
- Succeeded by: Siaosi Sovaleni

Minister for Infrastructure
- In office 7 January 2013 – 30 December 2014
- Preceded by: Himself (as Minister for Transport and Works)
- Succeeded by: ‘Etuate Lavulavu

Minister for Justice
- In office 10 November 2009 – 1 September 2011
- Prime Minister: Feleti Sevele; Sialeʻataongo Tuʻivakanō
- Succeeded by: Clive Edwards

Member of Parliament for Vavaʻu 15
- In office 26 November 2010 – 20 November 2025
- Preceded by: Constituency established
- Succeeded by: Alani Tangitau

Personal details
- Born: 24 December 1952 (age 73)
- Party: Independent

Samiu Kuita Vaipulu (born 24 December 1952) is a Tongan politician and former Cabinet Minister. He was the Deputy Prime Minister from 2010 to 2014 and is currently Minister for Trade and Economic Development. He most recently served as the Acting Prime Minister of Tonga from December 2024 to January 2025.

== Personal life ==
Vaipulu is from the island of Ovaka. He has worked as a tour operator and as a manager for the Shipping Corporation of Polynesia. He studied at the University of the South Pacific in 1989, graduating with a Diploma in Legal Studies. He continues to be involved in the tourism industry on his home island of Vavaʻu.

== Political career ==
Vaipulu was first elected to Parliament in 1987. He lost his seat in the 1990 election, but regained it in 1993. he then served until 2002, when he lost his seat again, but re-entered Parliament at the 2005 election. He was re-elected for his sixth term in 2008. In Parliament Vaipulu served as Chairman of the Committee of the Whole House.

In November 2009, Vaipulu was appointed to Cabinet as Minister for Justice. Unlike previous Cabinet appointments, he was not forced to resign his seat, and continued to serve as a People's Representative. In February 2010, Vaipulu supported the whipping of petty criminals.

Vaipulu was re-elected in the 2010 election. He was subsequently appointed Deputy Prime Minister, Minister of Justice and Minister for Transport and Works in the Cabinet of Lord Tuʻivakanō. On 1 September 2011, the Justice portfolio was reshuffled to Clive Edwards, with Vaipulu retaining the others.

In October 2011, he was one of twelve MPs to vote in favour of large increases to allowances for any MPs on sick leave overseas. He argued the circumstances for such allowances would be rare, and that it was therefore justifiable. The motion was carried, and Vaipulu asked whether it would be possible for the eight MPs who had voted against (in protest against MPs spending public money on themselves at a time of economic difficulty) to be deprived of the allowances in question. Fellow MP Sione Taione, among the eight in question, reportedly responded by "query[ing] what [Vaipulu] was on about".

After the 2014 election Vaipulu put himself forward as a candidate for Prime Minister, but was defeated by 15 votes to 11. In 2019 following the death of ʻAkilisi Pōhiva he was appointed to the cabinet of Pohiva Tuʻiʻonetoa as Minister for Trade and Economic Development. On 25 January 2021 he was appointed Minister of Justice and Prisons, replacing Sione Vuna Fa'otusia who had resigned in December 2020.

He was re-elected in the 2021 election. On 28 December 2021 he was appointed to the Cabinet of Siaosi Sovaleni as Minister for Justice and Prisons. Following the resignation of Sovaleni as Prime Minister in December 2024 he became acting Prime Minister.

He lost his seat at the 2025 election.

== Honours ==
National honours

- Order of Queen Sālote Tupou III, Member (31 July 2008)
