= Tevita Tuʻivakano =

Prime Minister of Tonga from 1912 to 1923

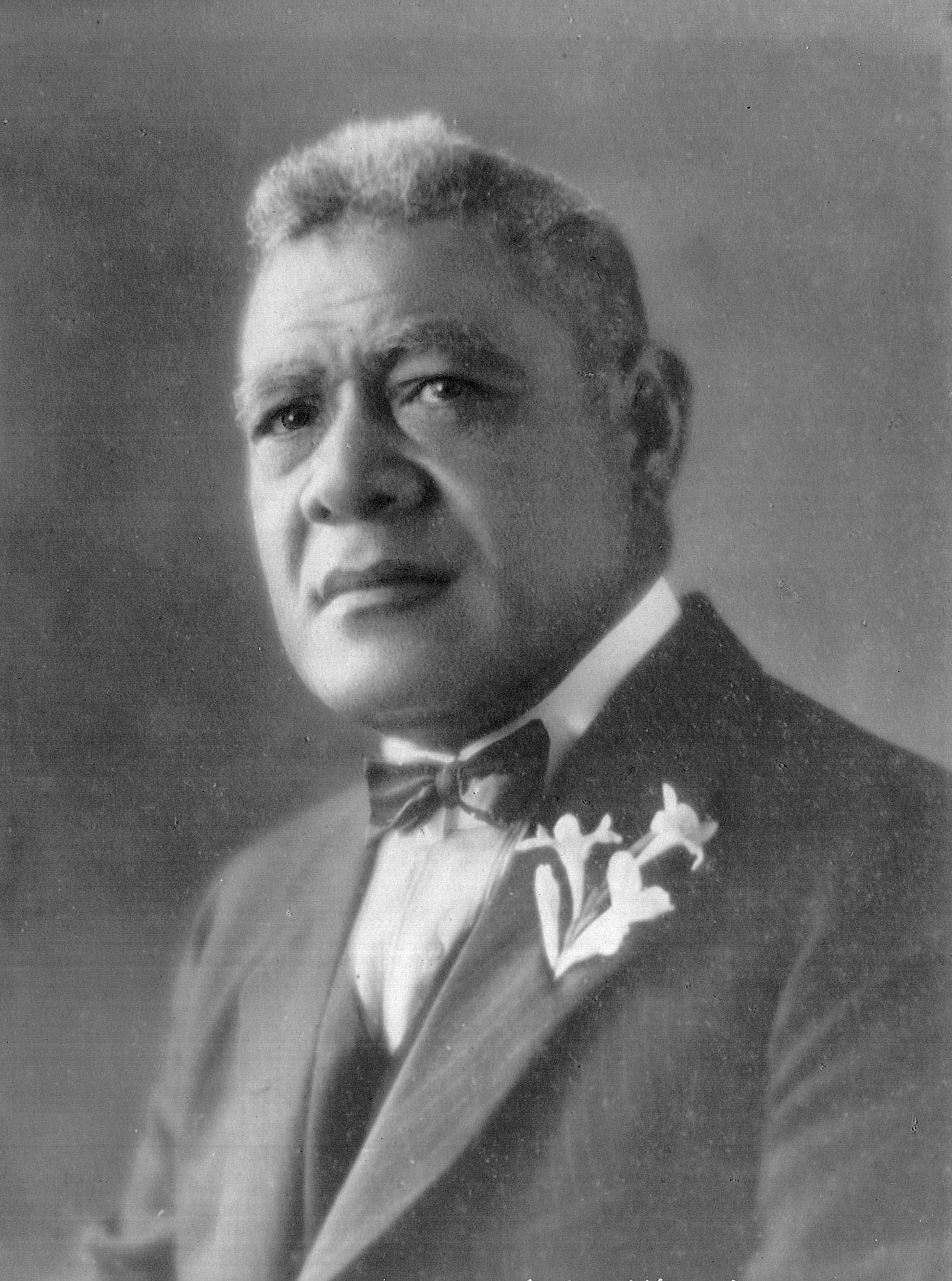

Prime Minister of Tonga
- In office 30 September 1912 – 30 June 1923
- Monarchs: George Tupou II; Sālote Tupou III
- Preceded by: Sione Tupou Mateialona
- Succeeded by: Viliami Tungī Mailefihi

Tēvita Tuʻivakano (born Tēvita Polutele Kaho) was a politician from Tonga who served as Prime Minister of Tonga from 30 September 1912 to 30 June 1923.
