= ʻUliti Uata =

Tongan politician (born 1936)

Minister of Health
- In office 25 January 2011 – 25 June 2012
- Prime Minister: Sialeʻataongo Tuʻivakanō
- Preceded by: ʻAkilisi Pōhiva
- Succeeded by: Tonga Tuʻiʻafitu

Member of the Tongan Parliament for Haʻapai 13
- In office 25 November 2010 – 27 November 2014
- Preceded by: none (seat created)
- Succeeded by: Veivosa Taka

Member of Parliament for Haʻapai
- In office 4 February 1993 – 25 November 2010
- Succeeded by: none (seat disestablished)
- In office 1975–1980

Personal details
- Born: 24 August 1936 (age 89)
- Party: Democratic Party of the Friendly Islands

ʻUliti Uata (born 24 August 1936) is a Tongan politician. He is a member of the Human Rights and Democracy Movement and the Democratic Party of the Friendly Islands.

== Biography ==
He was initially a businessman, running several businesses including "inter-islands ferries, general store, tourism, and others", until he entered politics and "divested himself" of his businesses so as to focus on his political career and on his family. His wife, Luisa Mataele Uata, is a distinguished baker and successful businesswoman. His grandson is American former professional football player Loni Fangupo.

Uata was first elected to the Legislative Assembly of Tonga in 1975, and served as a People's Representative until 1980. After a break from politics, he contested the 1993 election and won the seat of Ha'apai. He has been re-elected in every subsequent election.

In 2007, Uata was one of several pro-democracy MPs charged with sedition over speeches given before the 2006 Nuku'alofa riots. The charges were dismissed in September 2009.

Uata was re-elected for an eighth term in the 2010 election, for the new single-seat constituency of Haʻapai 13, and nominated to the post of Minister of Health on 25 January 2011, following ʻAkilisi Pohiva's resignation from that position. In late June 2012, Uata -along with two other ministers- resigned from the Cabinet, so as to support a motion of no confidence tabled by his party (DPFI) against the government. He was succeeded as Minister for Health by Lord Tuʻiʻafitu.
