= Deputy Prime Minister of Tonga =

Deputy head of government of the Kingdom of Tonga

The Deputy Prime Minister of Tonga is the principal deputy of the Prime Minister of Tonga. The incumbent, Viliami Latu, has served since January 2026.

== List of officeholders ==
- Basil Thomson (1890 – ?)
- Havea Tui'ha'ateiho (1953–1960)
- Fatafehi Tuʻipelehake (1961 – ?)
- Mahe 'Uli'uli Tupouniua, (1965 – 1972)
- Siosaia Aleamotuʻa Laufilitonga Tuita, (1974 – 1989)
- Baron Vaea (? – 1991)
- Langi Kavaliku (22 August 1991 – 2000)
- Tevita Poasi Tupou (2000 – 2001)
- Clive Edwards, acting (2001)
- James Cecil Cocker (October 2001 – 2005 – ?)
- Viliami Tangi (May 2006 – 4 January 2011)
- Samiu Vaipulu (5 January 2011 – 30 December 2014)
- Siaosi Sovaleni (30 December 2014 – 6 September 2017)
- Semisi Sika (16 January 2017 – 10 October 2019)
- Sione Vuna Fa'otusia (10 October 2019 – 14 December 2020)
- Maʻafu Tukuiʻaulahi (16 December 2020 – 12 December 2021)
- Poasi Tei (28 December 2021 – 10 August 2022)
- Taniela Fusimalohi (28 January 2025 – 18 December 2025)
- Viliami Latu (6 January 2026 – present)

== See also ==
- Politics of Tonga
