= Sialeʻataongo Tuʻivakanō =

Prime Minister of Tonga from 2010 to 2014

The Honourable Lord Tuʻivakanō
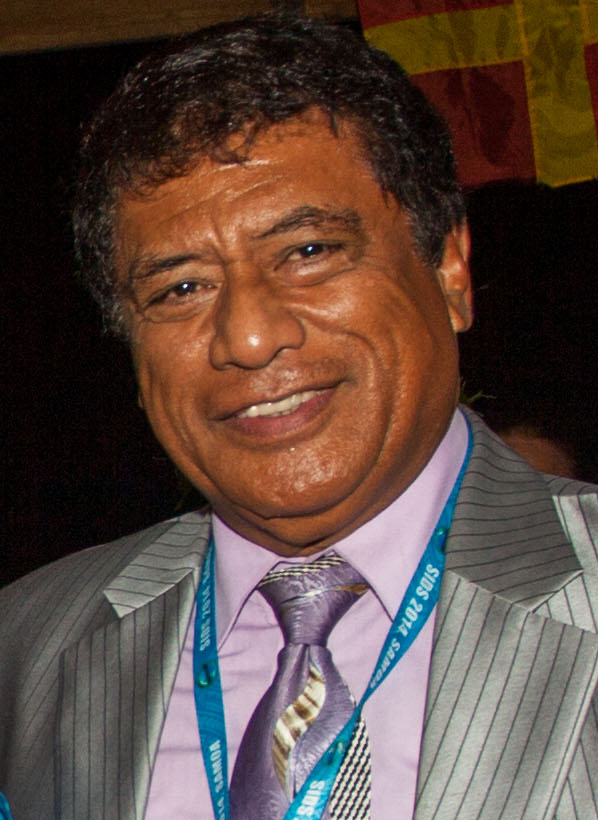
- Tuʻivakanō in 2014

Prime Minister of Tonga
- In office 22 December 2010 – 30 December 2014
- Monarchs: George Tupou V; Tupou VI
- Deputy: Samiu Vaipulu
- Preceded by: Feleti Sevele
- Succeeded by: ʻAkilisi Pōhiva

Personal details
- Born: 15 January 1952 (age 74) Niutoua, Tonga
- Party: Independent
- Spouse: Hon. Joyce Robyn Sanft
- Children: 5
- Parent(s): Hon. Siaosi Kiu Ngalumoetutulu Kiutauʻivailahi Kaho; Hon. Fatafehiʻolapaha Liku
- Education: Flinders University
- Tuʻivakanō's voice Tuʻivakanō speaking at the Connect Asia-Pacific 2013 Summit; Recorded November 20, 2013

Siale ʻAtaongo Kaho, Lord Tuʻivakanō (born 15 January 1952) is a Tongan politician who served as the prime minister of Tonga from 2010 to 2014.

== Descent and naming ==
Tuʻivakanō was born in Niutoua on Tongatapu as Siale ʻAtaongo Kaho. His parents were Siaosi Kiu Ngalumoetutulu Kiutauʻivailahi Kao and Fatafehiʻolapaha Liku. He ascended to the traditional Tongan noble title of Tuʻivakanō (literally: king of the borrowed boat) in January 1986 after the death of his father. As customary in Tonga, since that time his baptismal name is no longer used, instead he is referred to as Tuʻivakanō (without any further qualification), or in more formal surroundings as ʻEiki nōpele Tuʻivakanō, nowadays translated in English as Lord (noble) Tuʻivakanō. To distinguish him from previous holders of the title, his original name can be added in parentheses after his title.

Tuʻivakanō is the grandson of a former speaker of the Tongan Legislative Assembly, Siosiua Niutupuʻivaha Kaho, who was the younger brother of Prime Minister Tēvita Polutele Kaho.

== Background ==
Tuʻivakanō was educated at Tonga Side School and Tonga High School in Tonga, then at Three Kings Primary School and Wesley College in Auckland, New Zealand. Tuʻivakanō's qualifications include a Teaching Diploma obtained in 1974 from Ardmore Teaching College, New Zealand. In 1991 he received a bachelor's degree with Honours in Political Science after three years of study at the Flinders University of South Australia. Returning to Tonga following his study in New Zealand, Tuʻivakanō worked in teaching at the Tonga High School and trained in youth development in Malaysia and Singapore in 1980. Tuʻivakanō gained further experience in the Tongan education system appointed as Education Officer within the Ministry of Education in 1982. Between 1992 and 1996 Tu'ivakano became Senior Education Officer for Youth, Sport and Culture. During this period Tu'ivakano was involved with various Tongan Sporting organisations holding president roles with the Tonga National Rugby League, Tonga Sumo Association, Tonga National Taekwando Association and Vice presidency of the Tongan National Olympic Committee.

== Political career ==
Tuʻivakanō was elected as a noble representative for the island of Tongatapu in the 1996 election. From July 2002 to 2004 he served as Speaker of the Tongan Legislative Assembly. During his term as Speaker Tu'ivakano was in charge of Legislative Assembly Reforms involving the Reorganization of the assembly, Standing Orders of the House and realignment of the Parliamentary Pensions Scheme in accordance with other Commonwealth Countries. In March 2005 he was appointed to Cabinet as Minister for Works. A reshuffle in May 2006 saw him holding the portfolios of Minister for Training, Employment, Youth and Sport.

Tuʻivakanō was re-elected as a noble representative for Tongatapu in the 2010 election.

== Prime minister ==
On 21 December 2010 Tuʻivakanō was elected prime minister in a secret ballot. Following constitutional reforms, this was the first time the Prime Minister was elected by Parliament, rather than appointed by the monarch. The only other contender was people's representative ʻAkilisi Pohiva, leader of the Democratic Party of the Friendly Islands, which had twelve seats in Parliament (nine others being held by representatives of the nobility, and five by people's representatives with no party affiliation). Pohiva received twelve votes for the premiership, while Tuʻivakanō was duly elected with fourteen. He was sworn in on 22 December.

It was under Tuʻivakanō's premiership that Tonga became, in November 2011, a founding member of the Polynesian Leaders Group, a regional grouping intended to cooperate on a variety of issues including culture and language, education, responses to climate change, and trade and investment. On 17 November 2011, Tuʻivakanō represented Tonga at the first meeting of the PLG, as prime minister in Apia, Samoa. Since his election Tuʻivakanō has continued Tonga's cooperation with the regional power of Australia, which is home to some 18,000 Tongans. In early 2011 the Australian Parliamentary Secretary for Pacific Island Affairs Richard Marles visited Tonga on two occasions and was the first overseas politician to visit Tuʻivakanō since his election. In June 2011 Australian senator John Hogg attended the opening of the Legislative Assembly of Tonga. In the period 2011-12 Australia Supplied the Tongan Government with A$32.1 million in Australian Overseas Development Assistance.

In September 2013 Tuʻivakanō suffered a stroke while attending the UN General assembly in New York.

Following his loss to ʻAkilisi Pōhiva in the 2014 election, Tuʻivakanō was appointed Speaker of the Tongan Parliament.

In March 2018 Tuʻivakanō was arrested and charged with bribery, perjury and money laundering. On 25 April 2020, he was convicted of these offenses, for which Tuʻivakanō received a two-year suspended sentence and a $US1,700 fine the offenses. Tu'ivakanō will keep his hereditary noble title, estates and parliamentary seat. The false statement charge related to an incident in July 2015 when, with the purpose of obtaining a passport for Hua Guo and Xing Liu and with intent to deceive Immigration, Tu'ivakano wrote a letter stating that Hua Guo and Xing Liu were naturalized as Tongans in October 2014. The gun and ammunition charges related to items found during a police search of Tu'ivakano's property in March 2018. In November 2020 an appeal saw him acquitted of perjury and making a false statement, but the conviction for possession of ammunition without a licence was upheld.

== Honours ==
National honours

- Order of Queen Sālote Tupou III, Grand Cross (31 July 2008).

Political offices
| Preceded by Feleti Sevele | Prime Minister of Tonga; 2010–2014 | Succeeded by ʻAkilisi Pōhiva |
