= Prime Minister of Tonga =

Head of government

Prime Minister of the Kingdom of Tonga
- Palemia ʻo Tonga (Tongan)
- Coat of arms of the Kingdom of Tonga

- Flag of Tonga

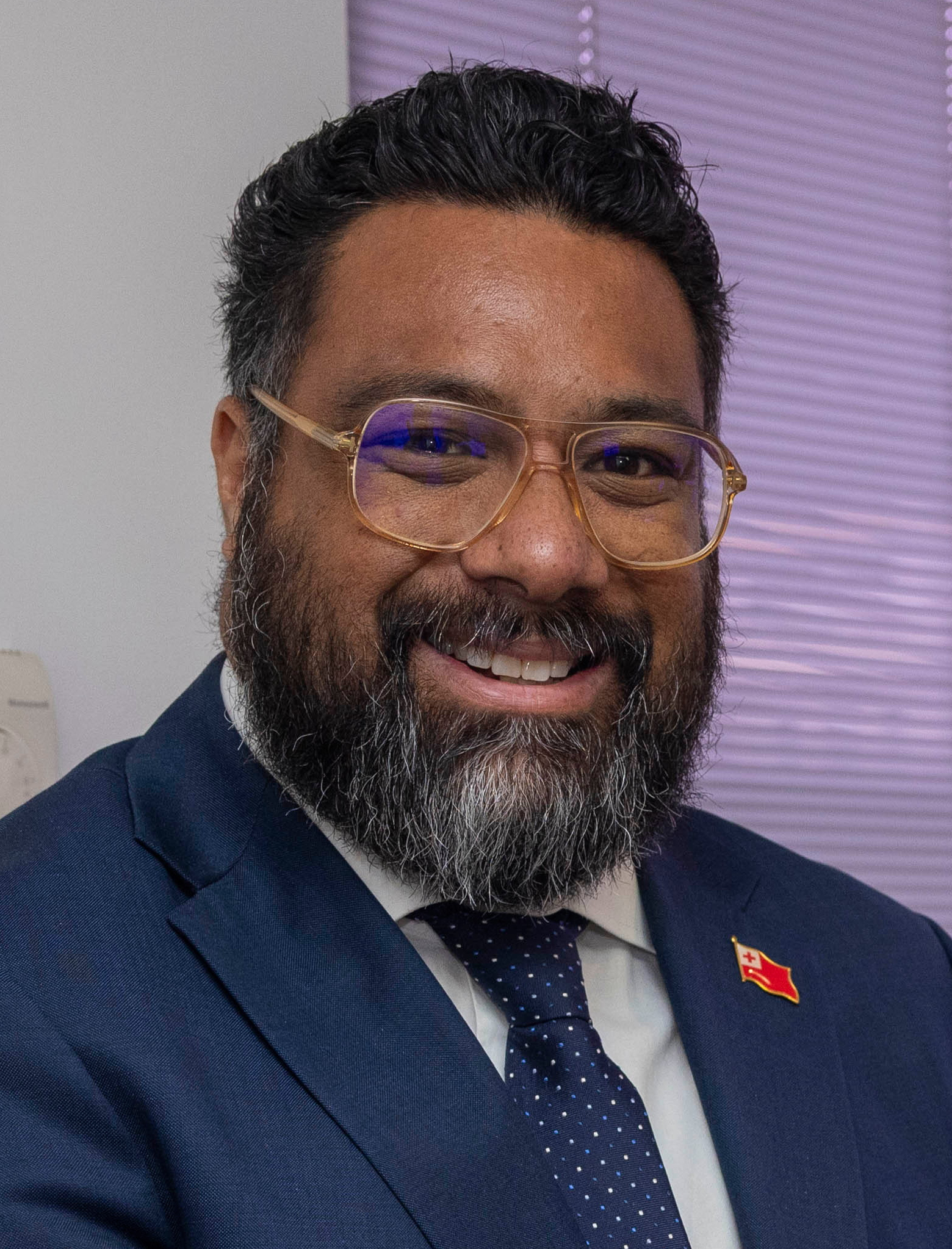
- Incumbent; Fatafehi Fakafānua since 18 December 2025
- Style: The Honourable
- Status: Head of government
- Abbreviation: PM
- Member of: Cabinet of Tonga; Legislative Assembly of Tonga
- Seat: Nukuʻalofa
- Appointer: King of Tonga
- Constituting instrument: Constitution of Tonga
- Inaugural holder: Tēvita ʻUnga (Premier); Fatafehi Tuʻipelehake (Prime Minister)
- Formation: 1876 (Premier); 1970 (Prime Minister)
- Deputy: Deputy Prime Minister of Tonga
- Salary: T$94,500 / US$40,212 annually
- Website: pmo.gov.to

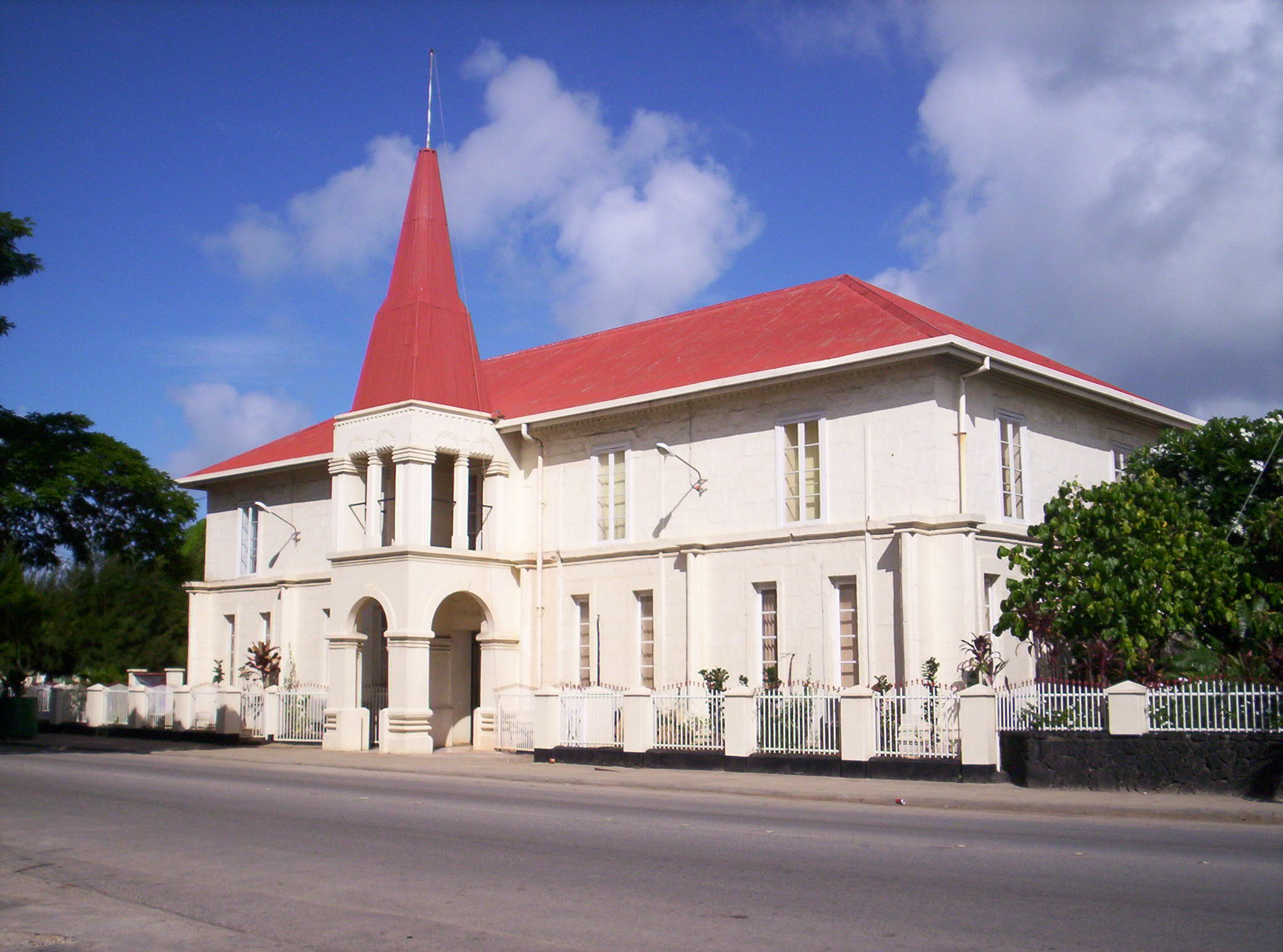
Prime Minister's office in Nukuʻalofa

The prime minister of Tonga (historically referred to as the premier) is the head of government of Tonga. Tonga is a monarchy with the king, currently Tupou VI, former prime minister, as head of state. The current prime minister is Fatafehi Fakafānua, who has served since 18 December 2025. Fakafānua was elected by the Legislative Assembly following the 2025 general election.

The office of prime minister was established by the Constitution of 1875, whose article 51 stipulates that the prime minister and other ministers are appointed and dismissed by the king.

The prime minister is assisted by the deputy prime minister.

== 2000s democratisation ==
During the 2000s, the country experienced an increase in democratisation. In March 2006, King Tāufaʻāhau Tupou IV appointed Feleti Sevele, a moderate member of the Human Rights and Democracy Movement, as prime minister. Sevele was the first commoner to hold this post since Shirley Waldemar Baker in 1881. All the prime ministers since Baker had been members of the nobility, or even the royal family.

In July 2008, King George Tupou V announced more substantial democratic reforms. He would abandon the essential part of his executive powers, and would henceforth follow the custom of monarchies such as the United Kingdom, exercising his prerogatives only with the prime minister's advice. In addition, he would no longer appoint the prime minister anyone he wished, but would appoint a member of the Legislative Assembly to be elected by the Legislative Assembly.

== List of premiers / prime ministers of Tonga ==
Portrait	Name (Lifespan)	Term of office			Party	Cabinet	Monarch (Reign)
Portrait	Name (Lifespan)	Start	End	Duration	Party	Cabinet	Monarch (Reign)
	Crown Prince; Tēvita ʻUnga (1824 – 1879)	1 January 1876	18 December 1879	3 years, 11 months	Independent	ʻUnga	George Tupou I r. 1845–1893
Vacant (18 December 1879 – April 1881)							George Tupou I r. 1845–1893
	Rev. Shirley Waldemar Baker (1836 – 1903)	April 1881	July 1890	9 years, 3 months	Independent	Baker	George Tupou I r. 1845–1893
	Siaosi Tukuʻaho (1854 – 1897)	July 1890	1893	2–3 years	Independent	Tukuʻaho	George Tupou I r. 1845–1893
	Siosateki Tonga (1853 – 1913)	1893	January 1905	11–12 years	Independent	Veikune	George Tupou II r. 1893–1918
	Siaosi Tuʻipelehake (1842 – 1912)	January 1905	January 1905	0 months	Independent	Pelehake	George Tupou II r. 1893–1918
	Sione Tupou Mateialona (1852 – 1925)	January 1905	30 September 1912	7 years, 7 months	Independent	Mateialona	George Tupou II r. 1893–1918
	Tevita Tuʻivakano (1869 – 1923)	30 September 1912	30 June 1923	10 years, 304 days	Independent	Tuʻivakano	George Tupou II r. 1893–1918
	Tevita Tuʻivakano (1869 – 1923)	30 September 1912	30 June 1923	10 years, 304 days	Independent	Tuʻivakano	Sālote Tupou III r. 1918–1965
	Prince; Viliami Tungī Mailefihi CBE (1887 – 1941)	30 June 1923	20 July 1941	18 years, 20 days	Independent	Mailefihi	Sālote Tupou III r. 1918–1965
	Solomone Ula Ata OBE (1883 – 1950)	20 July 1941	12 December 1949	8 years, 145 days	Independent	Ula	Sālote Tupou III r. 1918–1965
	Crown Prince; Tupoutoʻa Tungī KBE (1918 – 2006) (Note: Later King Taufa'ahau Tupou IV.)	12 December 1949	16 December 1965	16 years, 4 days	Independent	Tungī	Sālote Tupou III r. 1918–1965
	Prince; Fatafehi Tuʻipelehake CBE (1922 – 1999)	16 December 1965	22 August 1991	25 years, 249 days	Independent	Tuʻipelehake	Tāufaʻāhau Tupou IV r. 1965–2006
	Baron; Siaosi Vaea (1921 – 2009)	22 August 1991	3 January 2000	8 years, 134 days	Independent	Vaea	Tāufaʻāhau Tupou IV r. 1965–2006
	Prince ʻUlukālala Lavaka Ata (born 1959) (Note: Later King Tupou VI.)	3 January 2000	11 February 2006	6 years, 39 days	Independent	Lavaka	Tāufaʻāhau Tupou IV r. 1965–2006
	Feleti Sevele (born 1944)	30 March 2006	22 December 2010	4 years, 314 days	Human Rights and Democracy Movement	Sevele	Tāufaʻāhau Tupou IV r. 1965–2006
	Feleti Sevele (born 1944)	30 March 2006	22 December 2010	4 years, 314 days	Human Rights and Democracy Movement	Sevele	George Tupou V r. 2006–2012
	Lord Tuʻivakanō (born 1952)	22 December 2010	30 December 2014	4 years, 8 days	Independent	Tuʻivakanō I–II	George Tupou V r. 2006–2012
	Lord Tuʻivakanō (born 1952)	22 December 2010	30 December 2014	4 years, 8 days	Independent	Tuʻivakanō I–II	Tupou VI r. 2012–present
	ʻAkilisi Pōhiva (1941 – 2019)	30 December 2014	12 September 2019	4 years, 256 days	Democratic Party of the Friendly Islands	Pōhiva	Tupou VI r. 2012–present
	Sēmisi Sika (born 1968) acting	12 September 2019	8 October 2019	26 days	Democratic Party of the Friendly Islands	Pōhiva	Tupou VI r. 2012–present
	Pōhiva Tuʻiʻonetoa (1951 – 2023)	8 October 2019	27 December 2021	2 years, 80 days	Tonga People's Party	Tuʻiʻonetoa	Tupou VI r. 2012–present
	Siaosi Sovaleni (born 1970)	27 December 2021	9 December 2024	2 years, 348 days	Independent	Sovaleni	Tupou VI r. 2012–present
	Samiu Vaipulu (born 1953) acting	9 December 2024	22 January 2025	44 days	Independent	Sovaleni	Tupou VI r. 2012–present
	ʻAisake Eke (born 1960)	22 January 2025	18 December 2025	330 days	Independent	Eke	Tupou VI r. 2012–present
	Lord Fakafānua (born 1985)	18 December 2025	Incumbent	293 days	Independent	Fakafānua	Tupou VI r. 2012–present

== See also ==
- Politics of Tonga
- List of monarchs of Tonga
