= Sinaitakala ʻOfeina ʻe he Langi =

Tongan royal

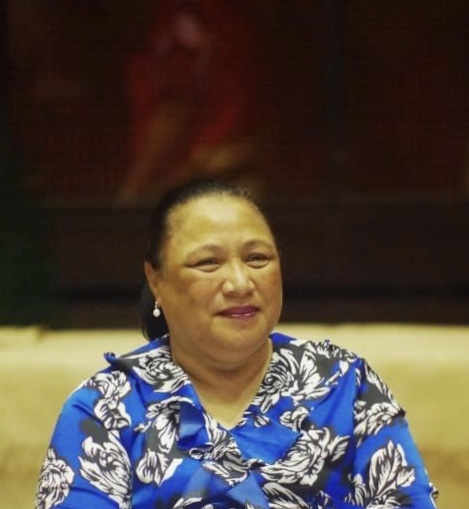
- Lady Fakafānua in 2015
- Born: 6 September 1953 (age 72)
- Spouse: The Hon Dr. Kinikinilau Tuto’atasi, 7th Lord Fakafānua (m. 1984; died 2006)
- Issue: Fatafehi Fakafānua; Sinaitakala Fakafanua; Tūtoatasi Fakafānua
- House: House of Tupou
- Father: Fatafehi Tuʻipelehake
- Mother: Melenaite Tupoumoheofo Veikune

Princess Sinaitakala ʻOfeina ʻe he Langi, Lady Fakafānua (born 6 September 1953) is a member of the Tongan royal family and the mother of Crown Princess Sinaitakala Fakafanua and Fatafehi Fakafānua, the current prime minister and former Legislative Assembly speaker.

She is a granddaughter of Queen Sālote Tupou III, who reigned from 1918 to 1965, and the younger sister of Mele Siuʻilikutapu, ʻElisiva Fusipala Vahaʻi and Lavinia Mata-ʻo-Tāone.

== Honours ==
National

- King George Tupou V Royal Family Order (1.8.2011).
- King Taufa’ahau Tupou IV Silver Jubilee Medal (4 July 1992).
- King George Tupou V Coronation Medal (31 July 2008).
- King Tupou VI Coronation Medal (4 July 2015).
