= Fusipala =

Fusipala may refer to:

- ʻElisiva Fusipala Taukiʻonetuku (1850–1889), granddaughter of George Tupou II and mother of George Tupou II
- ʻElisiva Fusipala Taukiʻonetuku (1912–1933), daughter of George Tupou II
- ʻElisiva Fusipala Vahaʻi (1949–2014), granddaughter of Sālote Tupou III
