= Solomone Ula Ata =

Prime Minister of Tonga from 1941 to 1949

The Honourable Solomone Ula Ata OBE

Prime Minister of Tonga
- In office 20 July 1941 – 12 December 1949
- Monarch: Sālote Tupou III
- Preceded by: Viliami Tungī Mailefihi
- Succeeded by: Tupoutoʻa Tungī

Personal details
- Born: 16 May 1883 Kolovai, Tonga
- Died: 27 March 1950 (aged 66) Nukuʻalofa, Tonga
- Party: Independent

Solomone Piutau Ulamoleka Ata OBE (16 May 1883 – 27 March 1950) was the Prime Minister of Tonga from 1941 until 1949.

== Biography ==
Ata was the son of Tevita Manú'opangai Ata (1864–1898) and Pauline Manutu'ufanga Niumeitolu and was a cousin of HM Queen Sālote Tupou III. He attended Newington College, Sydney (1896–1902), with six other Tongan nobles. On returning to Tonga he worked in government and was appointed to the Ata title on 12 November 1904. He held various ministerial portfolios in cabinet, including Minister of Police in 1917, and was Minister for Lands from 1925 until 1941. In 1933 he served as acting prime minister.

In 1937 he revisited Australia to study banana growing in sub-tropical areas. In 1941 he was appointed as Prime Minister of Tonga when his friend from his schooldays at Newington, Prince Viliami Tungī Mailefihi CBE, died. Ata thus became the second of four Old Newingtonian Tongan prime ministers in a row as he was succeeded by Crown Prince Tupoutoʻa Tungī KBE and then by Prince Fatafehi Tu'ipelehake CBE. Ata was made an honorary OBE in the New Years Honours List of 1947.

== Honours ==
- Honorary Officer of the Order of the British Empire (OBE)

Political offices
Preceded by Prince; Viliami Tungī Mailefihi; CBE	Prime Minister of Tonga; 1941–1949	Succeeded by Crown Prince; Tupoutoʻa Tungī; KBE
