= Lavinia Mata-ʻo-Tāone =

Tongan princess, third daughter of Prince Fatafehi Tu'ipelehake

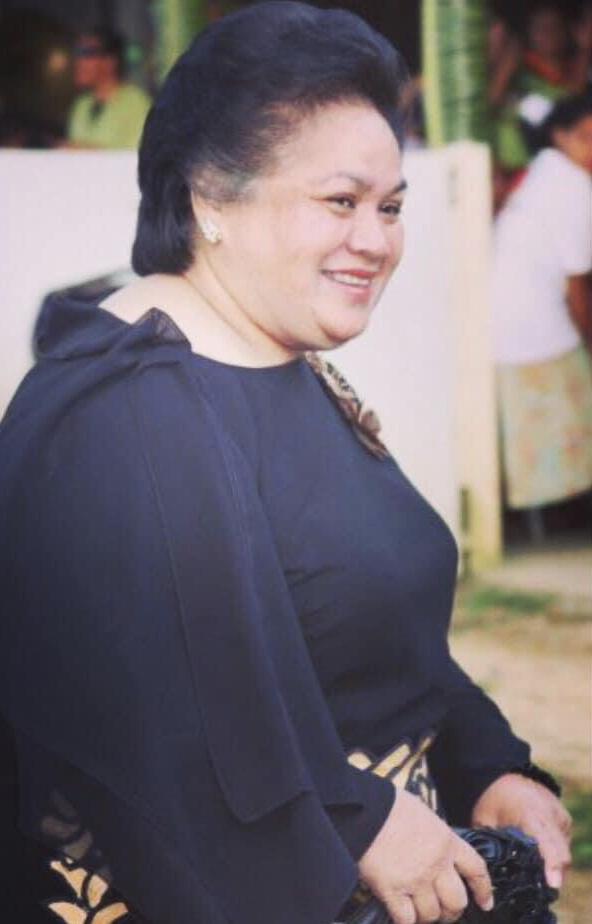
- Born: Lavinia Mata-ʻo-Tāone; 4 April 1952; Nukuʻalofa, Kingdom of Tonga
- Died: 22 June 2018 (aged 66); Auckland, New Zealand
- Burial: 30 June 2018; Langi ko Huelo ʻo Hangai Tokelau, Tokomololo, Kingdom of Tonga
- Spouse: Maʻafu Tukuiʻaulahi
- Issue: Tevita ‘Unga Tangitau; Lavinia Fangaʻaka
- House: Tupou
- Father: Fatafehi Tuʻipelehake
- Mother: Melenaite Tupoumoheofo Veikune

Princess Lavinia Mata-ʻo-Tāone, Lady Maʻafu (2 April 1952 – 22 June 2018) was a member of the Tongan Royal family. She was the third daughter of Prince Fatafehi Tuʻipelehake.

== Biography ==
Lavinia Mata-ʻo-Tāone was born in Nukuʻalofa on 4 April 1952, the third daughter of Prince Fatafehi Tuʻipelehake and Princess Melenaite Tupoumoheofo Veikune. Her grandmother, Queen Sālote Tupou III, gave her the name "Mata-ʻo-Tāone" after a kie hingoa passed down from Princess Lavinia Māhanga. She is a niece of King Tāufaʻāhau Tupou IV, and a cousin of Kings George Tupou V and Tupou VI.

Lavinia married Siosaʻia Lausiʻi, who later inherited the title of Maʻafu Tukuiʻaulahi and its estates of Vaini and Tokomololo. They had two children, Tevita ʻUnga and Lavinia Fangaʻaka.

Lavinia spent much time in Auckland, New Zealand. She died there on 22 June 2018 at the age of 66. She was brought back to Tonga on 29 June for the funeral. After the King and other members of the royal family received the funeral cortege at Fuaʻamotu International Airport, she lay in state overnight at the royal villa in Matatoa. Fourteen churches attended the prayer vigil held at the villa. She was buried on the following day at Langi ko Huelo ʻo Hangai Tokelau in Tokomololo. The people of Vaini observed 10 days of mourning, with a sacred kava ceremony (pongipongi tapu) held at Ongokie Residence.

== Ancestry ==
Ancestors of Lavinia Mata-ʻo-Tāone

16. Viliami Tungī Halatuituia
8. Siaosi U. Tukuʻaho
17. ʻAnaseini Tupou Veihola
4. Viliami Tungī Mailefihi
18. Sūnia Mafileʻo
9. Mele Siuʻilikutapu
19. Fane Tupou Vavaʻu
2. Fatafehi Tuʻipelehake, Príncipe de Tonga
20. Siaosi Fatafehi Toutaitokotaha
10. George Tupou II of Tonga
21. ʻElisiva Fusipala Taukiʻonetuku
5. Salote Tupou III of Tonga
22. ʻAsipeli Kupuavanua Fotu
11. Lavinia Veiongo
23. Tōkanga Fuifuilupe
1. Princesa Lavinia Mata-ʻo-Tāone de Tonga
24. ʻOsaiasi Tonga Veikune
12. Siosateki Tonga Veikune
25. Meleane Taufaʻuliʻuli
6. ʻInoke Sateki Matafonua Foru Veikune
13. ʻAne Manakovikafoʻou Fusifusi Vahaiʻi
3. Melenaite Tupoumoheofo Veikune
28. Pita Fotofili
14. Siosiua Fotofili
29. Hulita Fusituʻa
7. Lavinia Veiongo Veikune
30. Viliami Fatafehiolapaha Kalaniuvalu
15. ʻAmelia Leafaʻitulangi Kalaniuvalu
31. ʻUngatea Kioa
