= Mele Siuʻilikutapu =

Tongan royal and politician (1948–2023)

Princess Mele Siuʻilikutapu
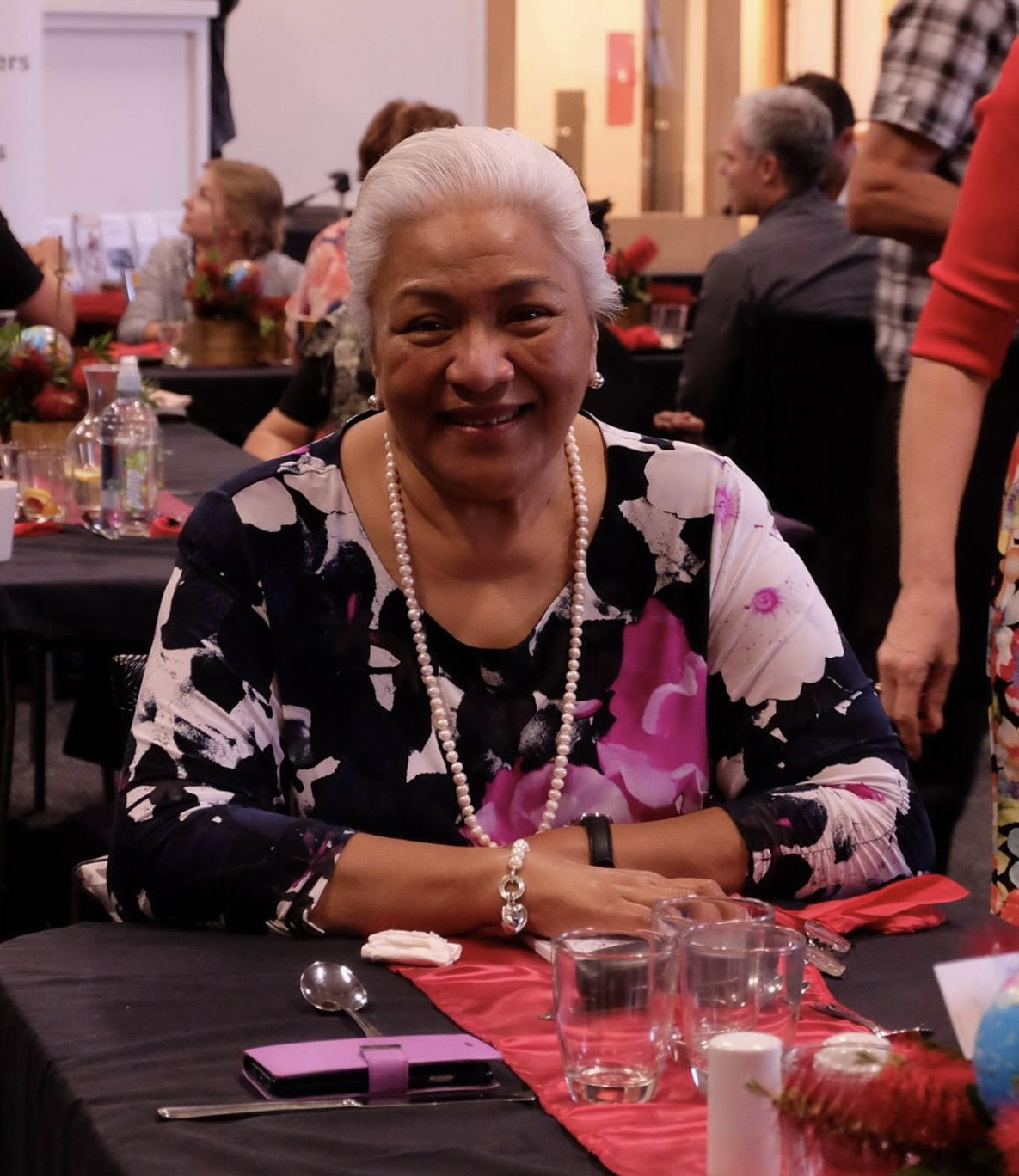
- Princess Mele Siuʻilikutapu in 2016

Member of the Legislative Assembly
- Term: 1975 – 1978
- Successor: Papiloa Foliaki
- Constituency: Tongatapu
- Born: 12 May 1948; Tonga
- Died: 28 May 2023 (aged 75); Auckland, New Zealand
- Spouse: Josh Liavaʻa (m. 1969; ann. 1969) Kalanivalu-Fotofili (m. 1970)
- Issue: Kalaniuvalu Fotofili
- House: House of Tupou
- Father: Fatafehi Tuʻipelehake
- Mother: Melenaite Tupoumoheofo Veikune
- Religion: Methodist Christian

Princess Mele Siuʻilikutapu of Tonga (12 May 1948 – 28 May 2023) was a Tongan royal and politician. In 1975 she was elected to the Legislative Assembly, becoming its first female member.

== Biography ==
Mele (Mary) Siuʻilikutapu was born in May 1948, the oldest daughter of Prince Fatafehi Tuʻipelehake and his wife Melenaite Tupoumoheofo Veikune. She attended the University of Auckland, where in October 1969 she married Josh Liavaʻa, a policeman. As a result, King Tāufaʻāhau Tupou IV had her returned to Tonga and annulled the marriage. The following year she married Kalanivalu-Fotofili, a noble.

In 1975 she contested the elections to the Legislative Assembly, and was elected as a people's representative in Tongatapu, becoming the country's first female parliamentarian. She remained a member until 1978.

Siuʻilikutapu later became deputy president of the National Women's Organisation and was president of the Langafonua Gallery and Handicrafts Centre. In 2018 she became patron of the Tonga Health Society Langimalie Clinic and she also served as patron of Tonga's first village council, the Lapaha Council.

She lived in Auckland, New Zealand in her later life and advocated for the rights of overstayers and disadvantaged Pasifika.

In 2021, when Prime Minister Jacinda Ardern made a formal apology on behalf of the New Zealand Government for the Dawn Raids of the 1970s, Siuʻilikutapu gave a speech to accept the apology on behalf of the Pasifika community.

== Death ==
Siuʻilikutapu died at Auckland City Hospital on 28 May 2023 aged 75. A funeral visitation was held for her in West Auckland, where Princess Angelica Latufuipeka received Sir Michael Jones, Jenny Salesa MP and Māori King Tūheitia. Her body was then flown to Tonga for a state funeral. She was buried at Mala'ekula, the royal burial grounds in Nuku'alofa.

New Zealand Prime Minister Chris Hipkins paid tribute to her, saying she was "a formidable leader and a proud advocate for women".

== Honours ==
National honours

- Order of the Crown of Tonga, Grand Cross (31 July 2008)
