= Semisi Fonua =

Tongan noble and politician

Speaker of the Legislative Assembly
- In office 1951–1958

Member of the Legislative Assembly
- In office 1936–1968
- Constituency: Tongatapu

Personal details
- Born: 1911
- Died: 5 January 1968; Lapaha, Tonga

Semisi Fatafehi Fonua (1911 – 5 January 1968) was a Tongan noble and politician. He held the titles of Kalaniuvalu and Fotofili, and was a member of the Legislative Assembly between 1936 and his death in 1968, serving as Speaker from 1951 until 1958.

== Biography ==
Born in 1911 to Fotofili Siosiua and Afa, Fonua was educated at primary school in Niuafoʻou and Tupou College. He was a suitor of Fusipala, but Queen Salote refused to allow them to marry despite the two being engaged. Shortly afterwards he was told to marry Sisilia Tuʻitavake, with the wedding taking place in June 1932. He became Kalaniuvalu in 1935 and took his father's Fotofili title in 1955.

He was elected to the Legislative Assembly in 1936 as one of the Noble representatives for the Tongatapu constituency. He was re-elected in every election until his death in January 1968, also serving as Speaker and vice-president of the Privy Council between 1951 and 1958. One of his sons, Sosi'ua Ngalumoetutulu, later also served as Speaker of the Legislative Assembly.
