= Tupoutoʻa (name) =

Tupoutoʻa is one of the hereditary titles of the Tongan nobility. It is also a given name. Notable people with the name include:

- Tupoutoʻa (Haʻapai) (died 1820), ruler of Haʻapai, Tonga
- Tupoutoʻa (1948–2012), former King of Tonga
- Tupoutoʻa Lavaka (born 1959), King of Tonga
- Tupoutoʻa ʻUlukalala (born 1985), crown prince of Tonga.
