= Nikotimasi Fatafehi Laufilitonga Kakau Vahaʻi =

Tongan politician (born 1971)

Member of the Tongan Parliament for Tongatapu Noble's constituency
- In office 16 November 2017 – 18 November 2021
- Preceded by: ʻAlipate Tuʻivanuavou Vaea
- Succeeded by: Sione Siale Fohe

Nikotimasi Fatafehi Laufilitonga Kakau Vahaʻi (born September 1971), styled Lord Vaha'i, is a Tongan noble and politician. He holds the title of Vahaʻi of Foʻui.

Vaha'i was born in 1971 to Hahano-ki-Malaʻe Kula-ʻa Sione Ngu Namoa, Lord Vahaʻi, and his wife, ʻElisiva Fusipala Vahaʻi.

At the 2017 Tongan general election he was elected to the Legislative Assembly of Tonga in the Tongatapu Noble's constituency on a coin-toss, defeating ʻAlipate Tuʻivanuavou Vaea. He lost his seat at the 2021 election.

== Honours ==
National honours

- Order of the Crown of Tonga, Commander (31 July 2008).
