= Vahaʻi of Foʻui =

Noble title in Tonga

The Vahaʻi of Foʻui is one of the 34 noble titles in Tonga. It may refer to:

- Vilisoni Fahitaha Namoa, holder of the title until 1985
- Hahano-ki-Malaʻe Kula-ʻa Sione Ngu Namoa, Lord Vahaʻi, holder of the title from 1985 to 2005
- Nikotimasi Fatafehi Laufilitonga Kakau Vahaʻi, holder of the title since 2005
