= Mailefihi =

Mailefihi is a name. Notable people with the name include:

- Viliami Tungī Mailefihi (1888–1941), Tongan high chieftain
- Viliami Tupoulahi Mailefihi Tukuʻaho (1957–2014), Tongan politician
