= Kingdom of Tonga (1900–1970) =

Protected state of the United Kingdom in Polynesia

Kingdom of Tonga Puleʻanga Fakatuʻi ʻo Tonga (Tongan)
- 1900–1970
- Flags Coat of arms
- Motto: "Ko e ʻOtua mo Tonga ko hoku tofiʻa" "God and Tonga are my inheritance"
- Anthem: "Ko e fasi ʻo e tuʻi ʻo e ʻOtu Tonga" (1900–1918; 1965–1970) "Song of the King of the Tongan Islands" (1900–1918; 1965–1970) "Song of the Queen of the Tongan Islands" (1918–1965); "God Save the King" (1900–1918; 1965–1970) "God Save the Queen" (1918–1965)
- Location of the Kingdom of Tonga with present-day borders shown.
- Status: Protected state of the United Kingdom
- Capital: Nuku'alofa
- Common languages: English; Tongan
- Religion: Free Wesleyan Church
- Government: Unitary parliamentary semi-constitutional monarchy
- Monarch
  - 1900–1918: George Tupou II
  - 1918–1965: Sālote Tupou III
  - 1965–1970: Tāufaʻāhau Tupou IV
- Prime Minister
  - 1900–1905: Siosateki Veikune (first)
  - 1965–1970: Fatafehi Tu'ipelehake (last)
- Consul
  - 1901–1909: Hamilton Hunter (first)
  - 1965–1970: Archibald Cameron Reid (last)
- Legislature: Legislative Assembly
- History
  - Treaty of Friendship: 18 May 1900
  - End of protection status: 4 June 1970
- Currency: Tongan pound (1921–1967); Tongan paʻanga (1967–1970)
- ISO 3166 code: TO
Preceded by	Succeeded by
Tonga	Tonga

The Kingdom of Tonga was a protected state of the United Kingdom from 1900 to 1970, when its protectorate status was removed.

== History ==
Tonga became a British protected state under a Treaty of Friendship on 18 May 1900, when European settlers and rival Tongan chiefs tried to oust King George Tupou II, and to secure the independence of Tonga amid further German territorial gains in the Pacific. The Treaty of Friendship and protected state status ended in 1970 under arrangements established prior to her death by the third monarch, Queen Sālote.

While never directly ruled by the British, Tonga's foreign affairs were conducted through the British consul, giving the United Kingdom veto power over foreign policies and finances of the Kingdom of Tonga. An unspoken agreement of the treaty that was common in British protected states was a new monopoly on Tonga's thriving vanilla industry, and their small deposits of minerals.

Tonga was affected by the 1918 flu pandemic, with 1,800 Tongans killed, around eight per cent of the residents.

For most of the 20th century Tonga was quiet, inward-looking, and somewhat isolated from developments elsewhere in the world. Tonga's complex social structure is essentially broken into three tiers: the King, the nobles, and the commoners. Between the nobles and commoners are Matapule, sometimes called "talking chiefs," who are associated with the King or a noble and who may or may not hold estates. Obligations and responsibilities are reciprocal, and although the nobility are able to extract favours from people living on their estates, they likewise must extend favours to their people. Status and rank play a powerful role in personal relationships, even within families.

Tonga regained its independence, and became a member state of the Commonwealth of Nations, on 4 June 1970.

== Gallery ==
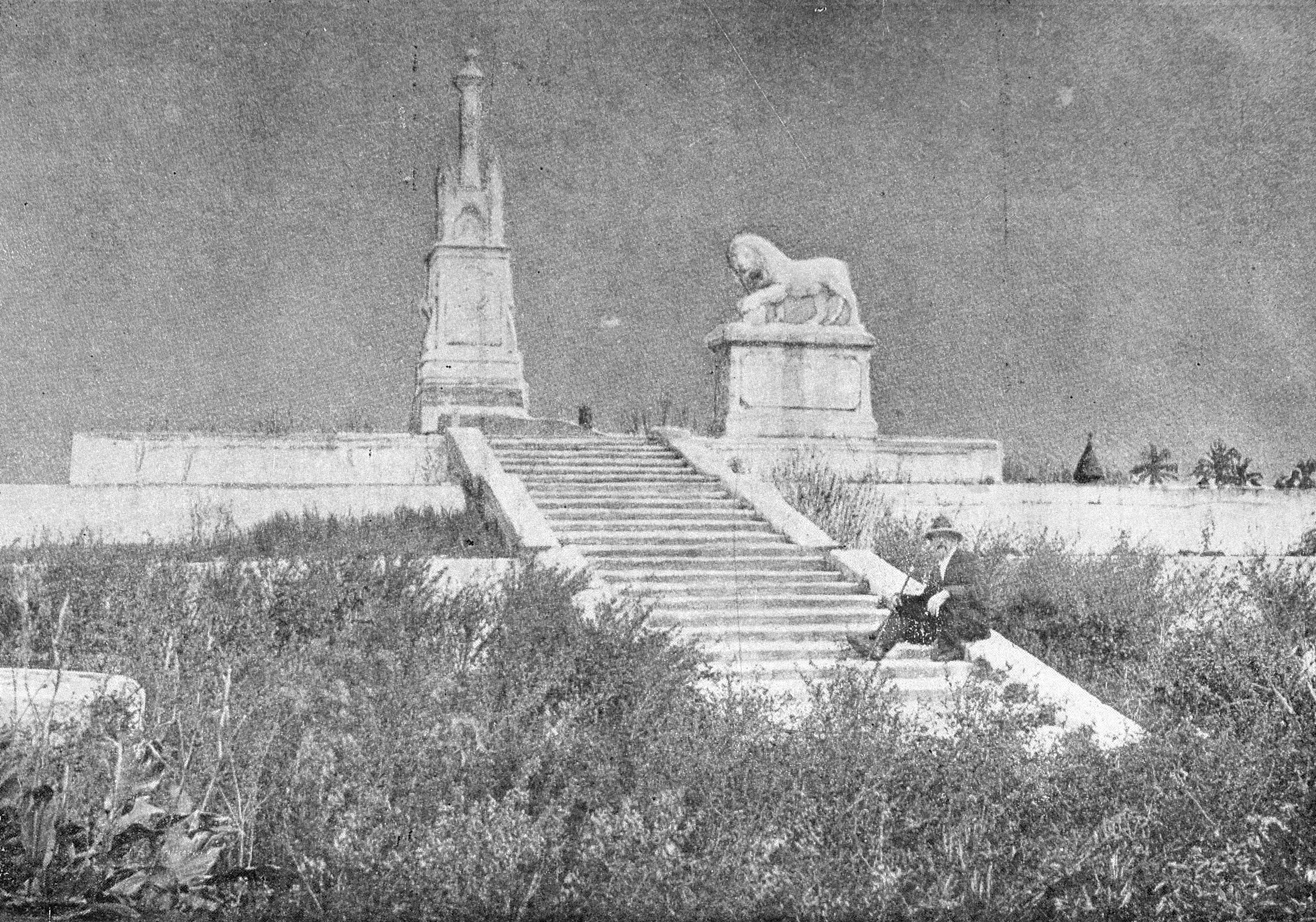
Tomb of King George Tupou I, 1900

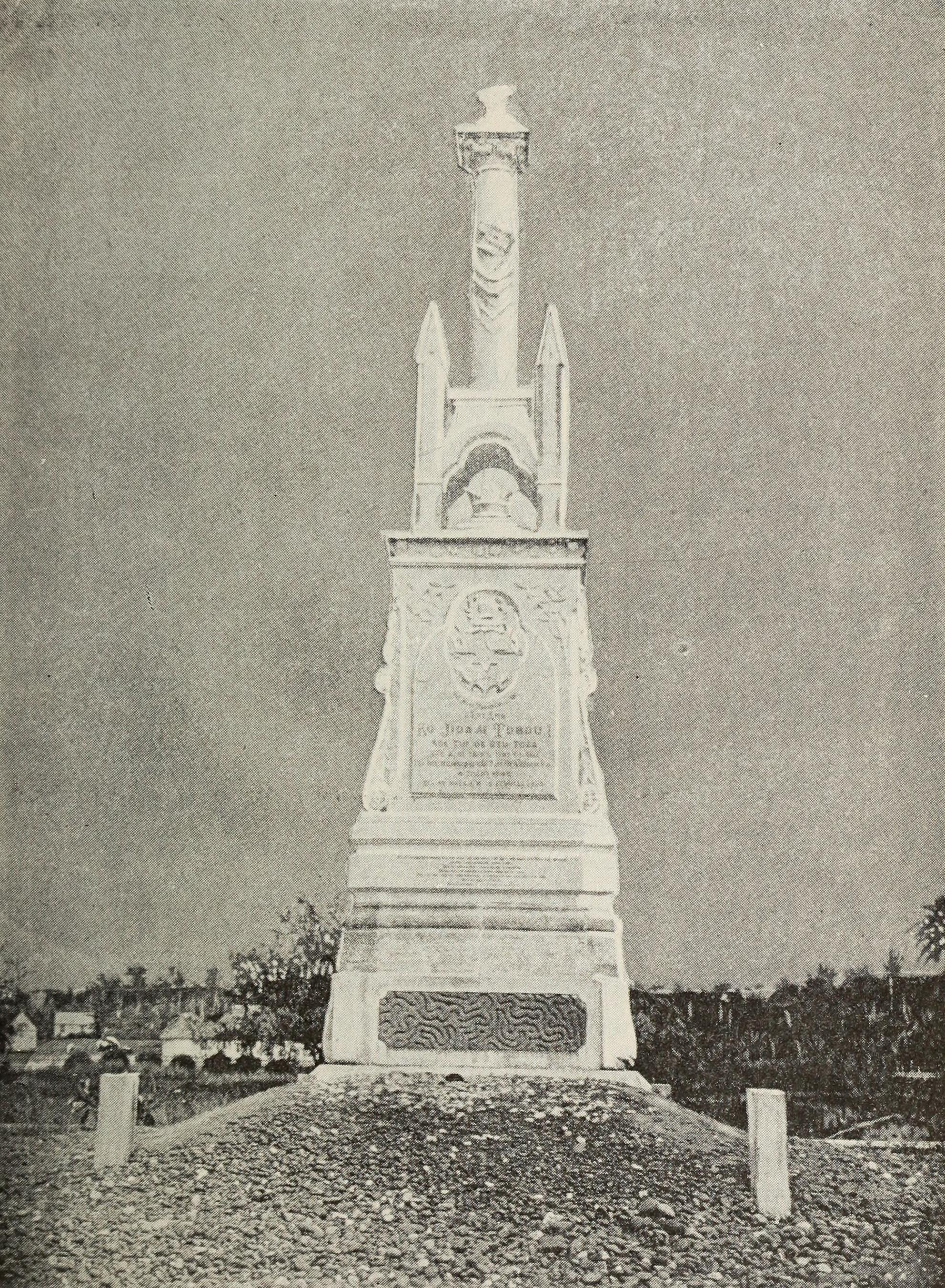
Tomb of King George Tupou I, 1900

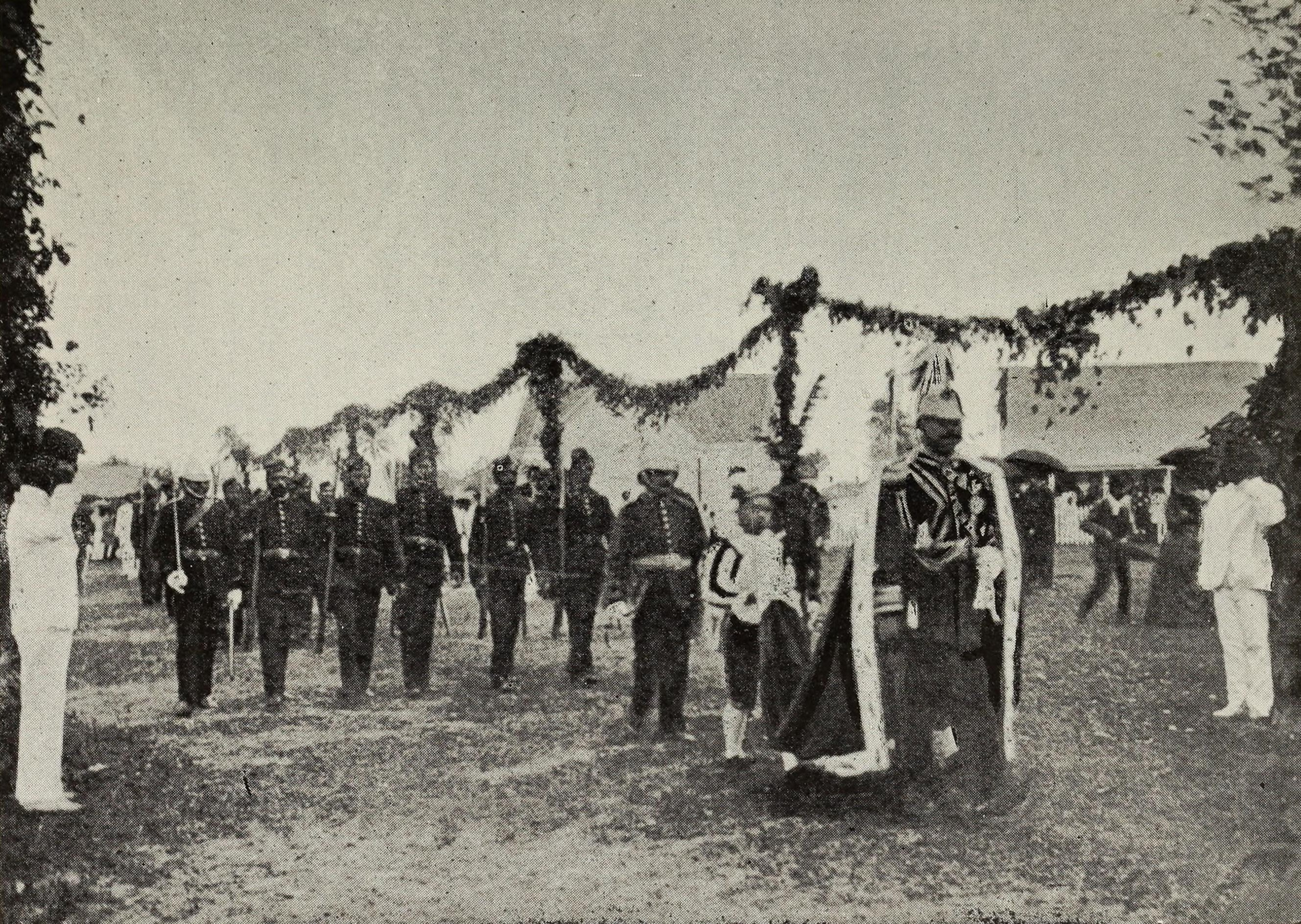
King George Tupou II going to the opening of the Tongan Parliament in 1900

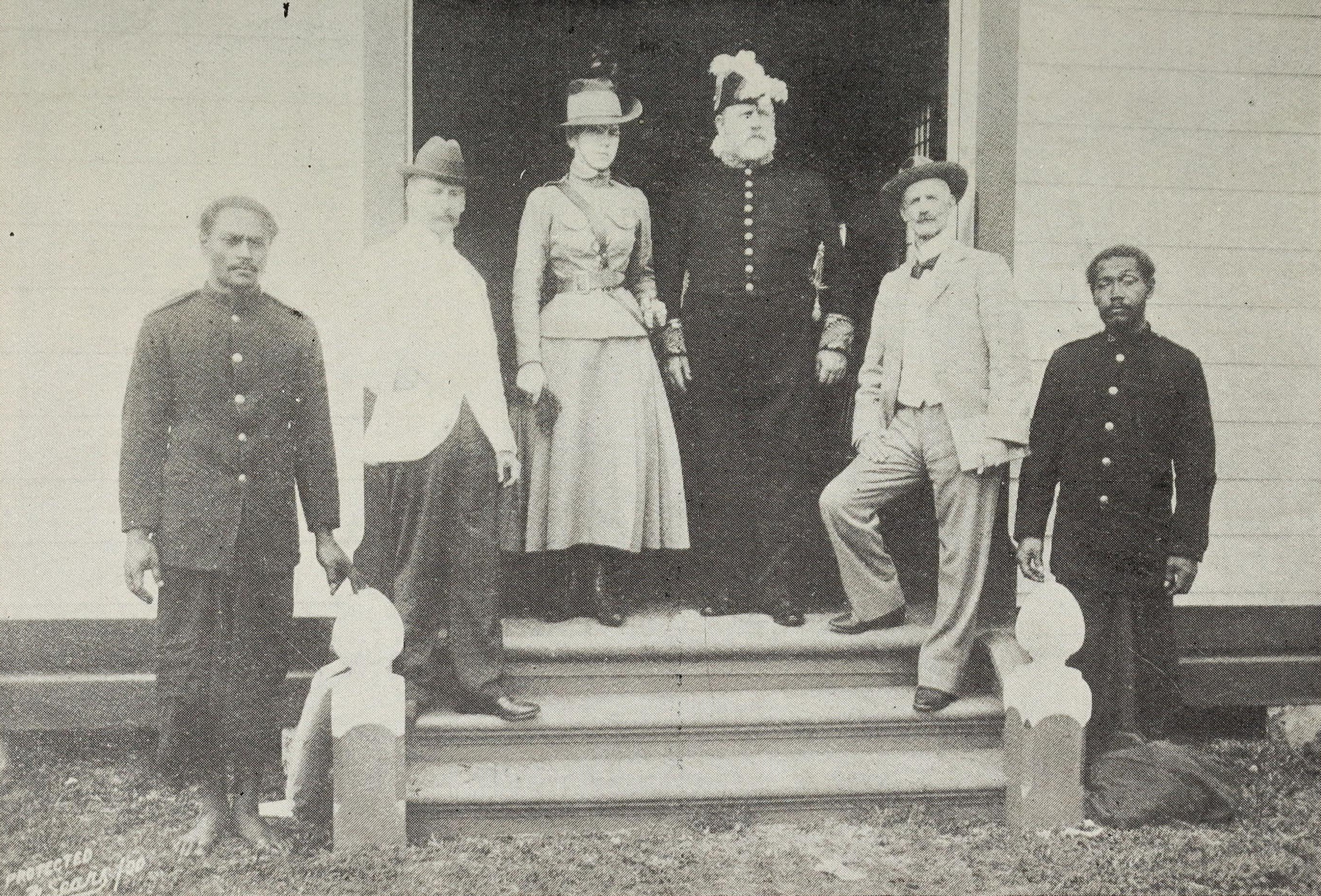
Richard Seddon and his wife at the opening of the Tongan parliament, 1900

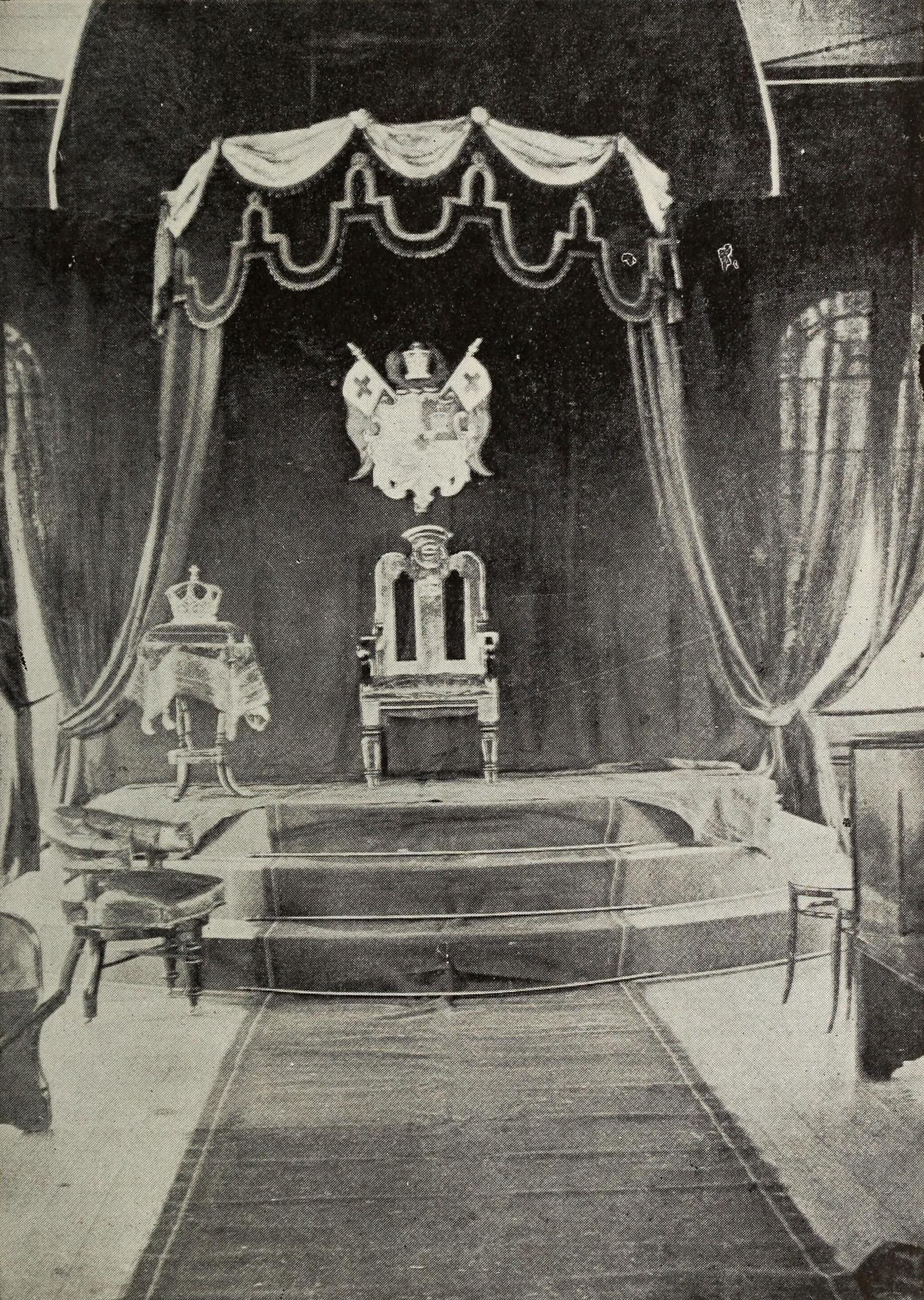
The royal throne of Tonga, 1900.

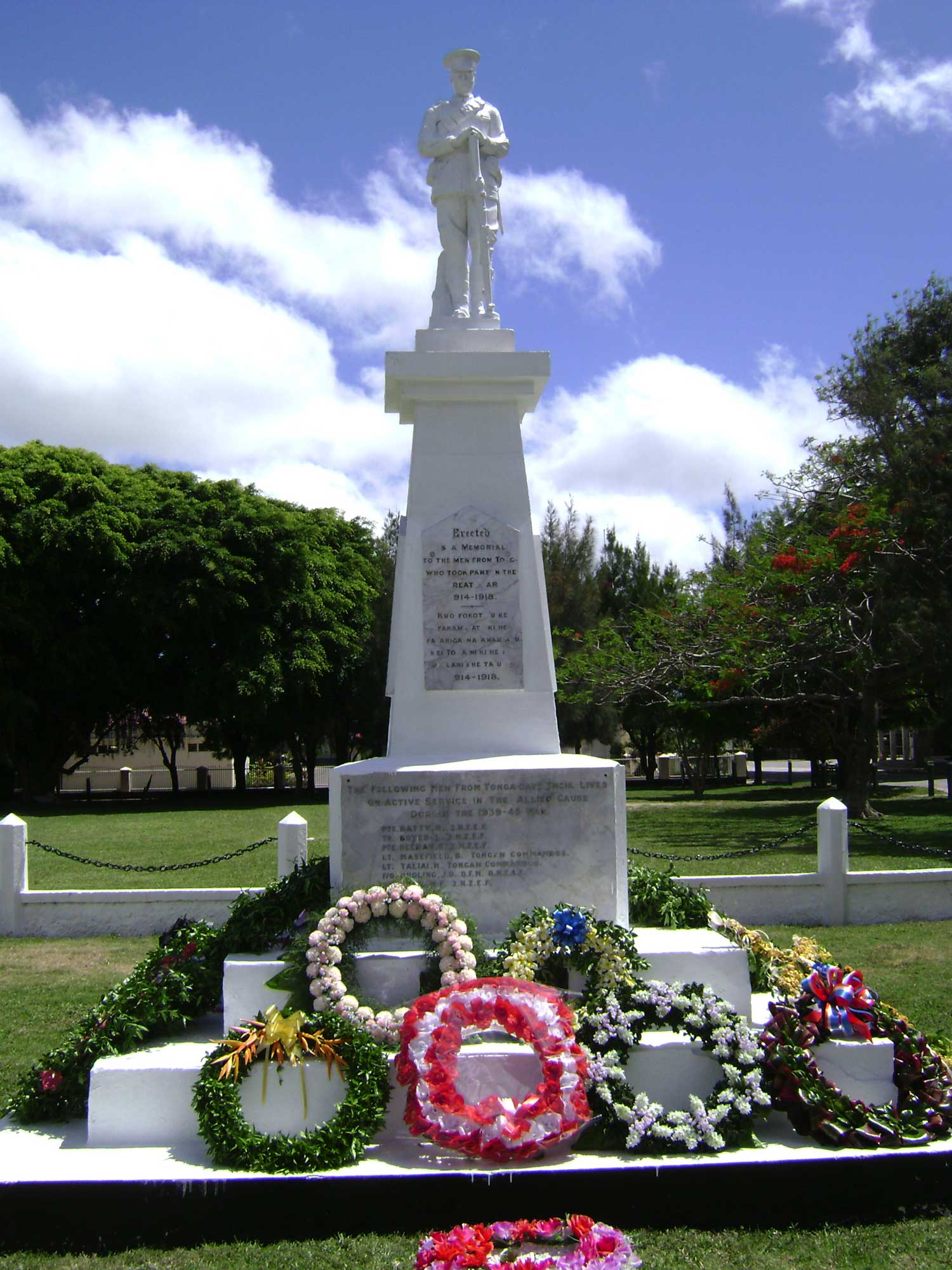
World War I memorial in Nukuʻalofa

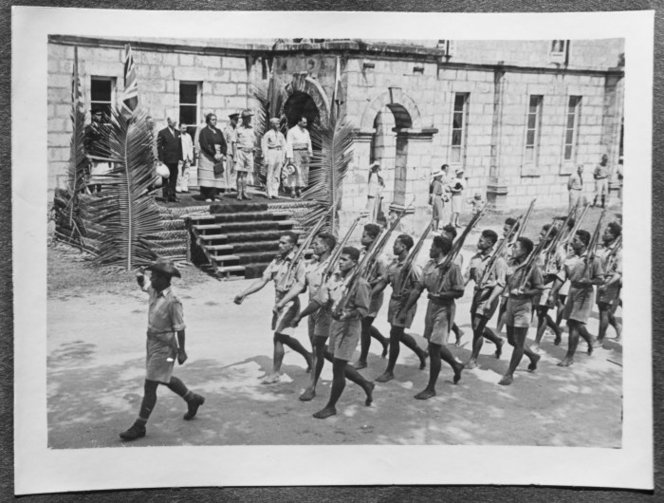
Members of the Tonga Defence Force of the 2nd NZEF on parade in Tonga celebrating the capitulation of Italy in 1945

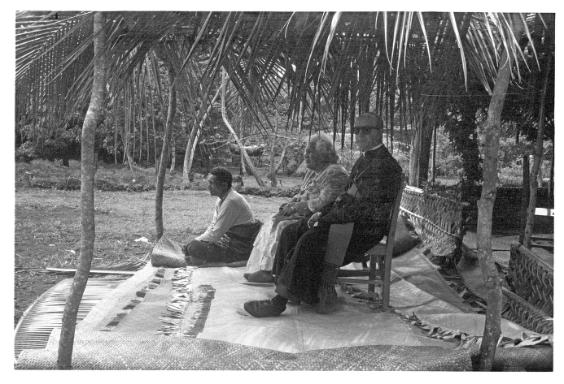
Bishop John Rodgers, Pīsila (wife of Lord Fusitu'a (Tevita Tu'iniua), full name Pisila Fotofili Fusitu’a) and Suli Seuli (matāpule of Fusitu'a) watching dancing. Inauguration of the Catholic church in Kolofo'ou. 1967
