= Tevita ʻUnga Tangitau =

Tongan noble and politician

The Honourable Tevita ʻUnga Tangitau

Member of Parliament for Tongatapu Nobles' constituency
- Incumbent
- Assumed office 20 November 2025
- Preceded by: Sione Siale Fohe

Personal details
- Party: none (Nobles' Representative)

Tevita 'Unga Tangitau, styled Lord Ma'afu is a Tongan noble and politician. He is the son of former Tongan deputy prime minister Maʻafu Tukuiʻaulahi and princess Lavinia Mata-ʻo-Tāone.

He was installed as Lord Ma'afu by King Tupou VI in April 2023.

He was elected to the Parliament of Tonga as Noble's Representative for Tongatapu at the 2025 Tongan general election.
