= Sione Siale Fohe =

Tongan noble and politician

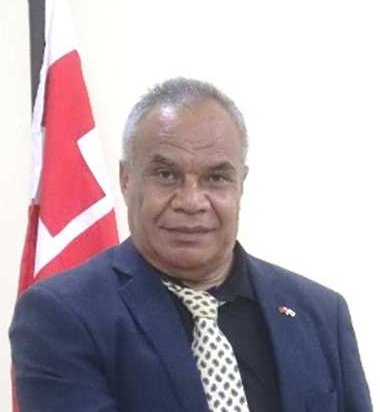
- Fohe in 2022

Minister for Agriculture, Food, Forests
- In office 29 July 2022 – 10 December 2024
- Prime Minister: Siaosi Sovaleni
- Preceded by: Viliami Hingano
- Succeeded by: Siosiua Halavātau

Member of the Tongan Parliament for Tongatapu Noble's constituency
- In office 18 November 2021 – 20 November 2025
- Preceded by: Lord Vahaʻi
- Succeeded by: Tevita ‘Unga Tangitau

Sione Siale Fohe, styled Lord Fohe, is a Tongan noble, politician, and former Cabinet minister.

He was appointed to the title of Lord Fohe in November 2016. In October 2021 he was fined TOP$500 for assaulting a tenant on his estate.

He was first elected to the Legislative Assembly of Tonga at the 2021 Tongan general election. On 29 July 2022 he was appointed Minister for Agriculture, Food, and Forests in the cabinet of Siaosi Sovaleni, replacing Viliami Hingano. Following the resignation of Sovaleni as Prime Minister in December 2024, he resigned from Cabinet.

He did not stand at the 2025 election.
