= Fatafehi Tuʻipelehake =

Prime Minister of Tonga from 1965 to 1991

Prince Fatafehi Tuʻipelehake
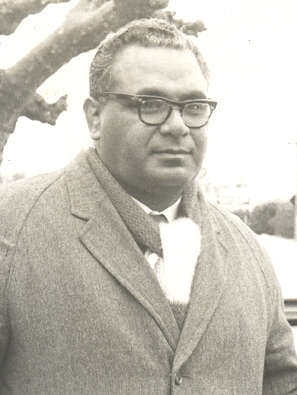
- Prince Tuʻipelehake in 1969

Prime Minister of Tonga
- In office 16 December 1965 – 22 August 1991
- Monarch: Tāufaʻāhau Tupou IV
- Deputy: Mahe Tupouniua; Siosaia Aleamotuʻa Tuita; Baron Vaea
- Preceded by: Crown Prince Tupoutoʻa Tungī
- Succeeded by: Baron Vaea
- Born: 7 January 1922; Royal Palace, Nukuʻalofa, Tonga
- Died: 10 April 1999 (aged 77); Auckland, New Zealand
- Burial: Malaʻekula
- Spouse: Princess Melenaite Tupoumoheofo Veikune (m. 1947; died 1993)
- Issue: Princess Mele Siuʻilikutapu; Princess ʻElisiva Fusipala Vahaʻi; Prince ʻUluvalu Takeivulangi; Princess Lavinia Mata-ʻo-Tāone; Princess Sinaitakala ʻOfeina ʻe he Langi; Prince Viliami Tupoulahi Mailefihi Tukuʻaho
- Father: Viliami Tungī Mailefihi
- Mother: Sālote Tupou III
- Religion: Methodism

Prince Fatafehi Tuʻipelehake OBE (Sione Ngū Manumataongo; 7 January 1922 – 10 April 1999) was the youngest son of Queen Sālote Tupou III of Tonga. He was the prime minister of Tonga from 1965 to 1991, a record tenure of over 25 years, serving under his brother King Tāufaʻāhau Tupou IV.

== Early life ==
Tuʻi Pelehake attended Newington College, Sydney, (1941–1942) and Gatton Agricultural College, Queensland, Australia. On 10 June 1947, Fatafehi married Melenaite Tupoumoheofo Veikune (13 November 1924 – 16 March 1993) in a double marriage ceremony (taʻane māhanga) with his older brother, the Crown Prince (at the time known as Tupoutoʻa-Tungī), who also married Halaevalu Mataʻaho ʻAhomeʻe. He received the title Tuʻi Pelehake (Fatafehi) from his mother (Queen Sālote) in 1944, and he also received the second-highest title of Tonga, Tuʻi Faleua (king of the second house).

From a non-traditional side, he was conferred an honorary CBE in 1966. He inherited from his mother an artistic side; he was a well-known poet and composer.

== Politics ==
His career was with his brother in the government. His first assignment was as governor of Vavaʻu (1949–1952), later of Haʻapai (1952–1953), and he then served as Minister of Health and Lands.

=== Prime minister ===
In 1965, he took over as Prime Minister of Tonga when his brother had to vacate the post on becoming king. He remained prime minister until he resigned in 1991 due to serious health problems. His last years were spent in a wheelchair on a life support system.

The titles that he kept, Tuʻi Pelehake and Tuʻi Faleua, eventually became synonymous with him. After his death, only the former was conferred to his son ʻUluvalu, while the latter returned to the king.

He died on 10 April 1999 in Auckland after a long illness.

== Descendants ==
Besides his son who inherited his positions, he also had four daughters and two sons:

- Princess Mele Siuʻilikutapu;
- Princess ʻElisiva Fusipala Vahaʻi;
- Prince ʻUluvalu Takeivulangi, 6th Tuʻipelehake;
- Princess Lavinia Mata ʻo Taone Maʻafu;
- Princess Sinaitakala ʻOfeina-ʻe-he Langi Fakafanua;
  - Fatafehi Fakafānua, 8th Lord Fakafanua, current Prime Minister of Tonga;
  - Princess Sinaitakala Tukuʻaho, who is married to her double second cousin, Crown Prince Tupoutoʻa ʻUlukalala
- Lord Viliami Tupoulahi Mailefihi, 7th Tuʻipelehake.
  - Prince Viliami Sione Ngu Takeivulai, 8th Tuʻipelehake (only son of late 7th Tuʻipelehake), who has two children with his divorced wife Cassandra Vaea.
    - Hon Siaosi Tupoulahi Tuʻipelehake (son)
    - Hon Melenaite Tupoumoheofo Tuʻipelehake (daughter)

== Honours ==
=== National ===
- Tonga: Knight Grand Cross with Collar of the Royal Order of Pouono
- Tonga: Knight Grand Cross of the Order of the Crown of Tonga
- Tonga: Recipient of the Royal Tongan Medal of Merit
- Tonga: Recipient of the King Tāufaʻāhau Tupou IV Silver Jubilee Medal

=== Foreign ===
- United Kingdom: Knight Commander of the Order of the British Empire (1977)
- United Kingdom: Recipient of the Queen Elizabeth II Coronation Medal
