= Tupoutoʻa =

Tongan noble title

Tupoutoʻa is a Tongan noble title. It is the most recent of the 33 hereditary titles and is principally used by crown princes of Tonga.

Queen Sālote Tupou III created the title in 1924, with a portion of land estate in Haʻapai, for former Prime Minister Sione Tupou Mateialona, a grandson of King George Tupou I. Mateialona died three years later without an heir, and the title thus reverted to the crown. It was not used again until the 1930s, when the then-crown prince Tāufaʻāhau was conferred with the title by the Queen. It has since become customary for the heir to the throne of Tonga to bear the title.

As with all titles of the Tongan nobility, the holder is responsible for the welfare of commoners residing on lands which are associated with the title. They are entitled to sit in the cabinet or the Legislative Assembly of Tonga as a representative of the nobility, and can also vote in legislative elections alongside other nobles.
