= Tuʻipelehake =

Tongan title ranking second after the king

The Tuʻipelehake (or Tuʻi Pelehake to be more consistent with similar titles, like Tuʻi Tonga, Tuʻi Haʻatakalaua and Tuʻi Kanokupolu) is one of the highest ranking chiefly titles in Tonga. In the absence of the ancient Tuʻi Faleua title, the Tuʻipelehake title is a high title due to, Tuʻi Kanokupolu. There have been several holders of the title mainly from the ruling royal family, from princes to prime ministers. It is Tongan custom to refer to the holder by his customary title, only adding his given name if confusion may arise. For example, Tuʻi Pelehake (ʻUluvalu).

The Estates of the Tuʻi Pelehake are:

- Fatai a town estate in Nukuʻalofa on Tongatapu
- Village of Pelehake in the eastern district on Tongatapu
- Village of ʻAlakifonua in the eastern district on Tongatapu
- Tonga's main airport, Fuaʻamotu International Airport, is also situated on his estate and not, as the name misleadingly suggests, in neighbouring Fuaʻamotu.
- Village of Vaihoi in Vavaʻu, close to the villages of Leimatuʻa and Holonga
- Village of Foa in Haʻapai

== Origin ==
All of the noble titles of Tonga were formalised in their current forms by royal decree under the 1875 Constitution. This hierarchy of titles was instituted by King George Tāufaʻāhau Tupou I in the 19th century. The Tuʻi Pelehake was one of Tonga’s six most ancient titles. The fact that these six titles were held by some of the most powerful chiefs of the day ultimately saved them from extinction. On the other hand, Tupou I allowed hundreds of other titles of nobility to fall into abeyance. The Tuʻi Pelehake title dates back to ʻAhoʻeitu, the first Tuʻi Tonga, in the 10th century. His older brother, Talafale, was bestowed the titles Tuʻi Pelehake and Tuʻi Faleua as backup titles in case the Tuʻi Tonga line died out. Note that the original Tuʻi Pelehake title therefore derives its authority from the Tuʻi Tonga. Although the title came to King George Tupou II, it has since been essentially linked to the Tuʻi Kanokupolu.

== Holders of the noble title ==
=== Lekaumoana ===
Lekaumoana's oldest son Maile Latamai was banished to Fiji, his younger son Uluvalu became the next Tuiʻpelehake.

=== ʻUluvalu ===
He was the son of Lekaumoana.

=== Filiaipulotu ===
He was the son of ʻUluvalu. He married Sālote Pilolevu, the daughter of George Tupou I.

=== Toutaitokotaha ===
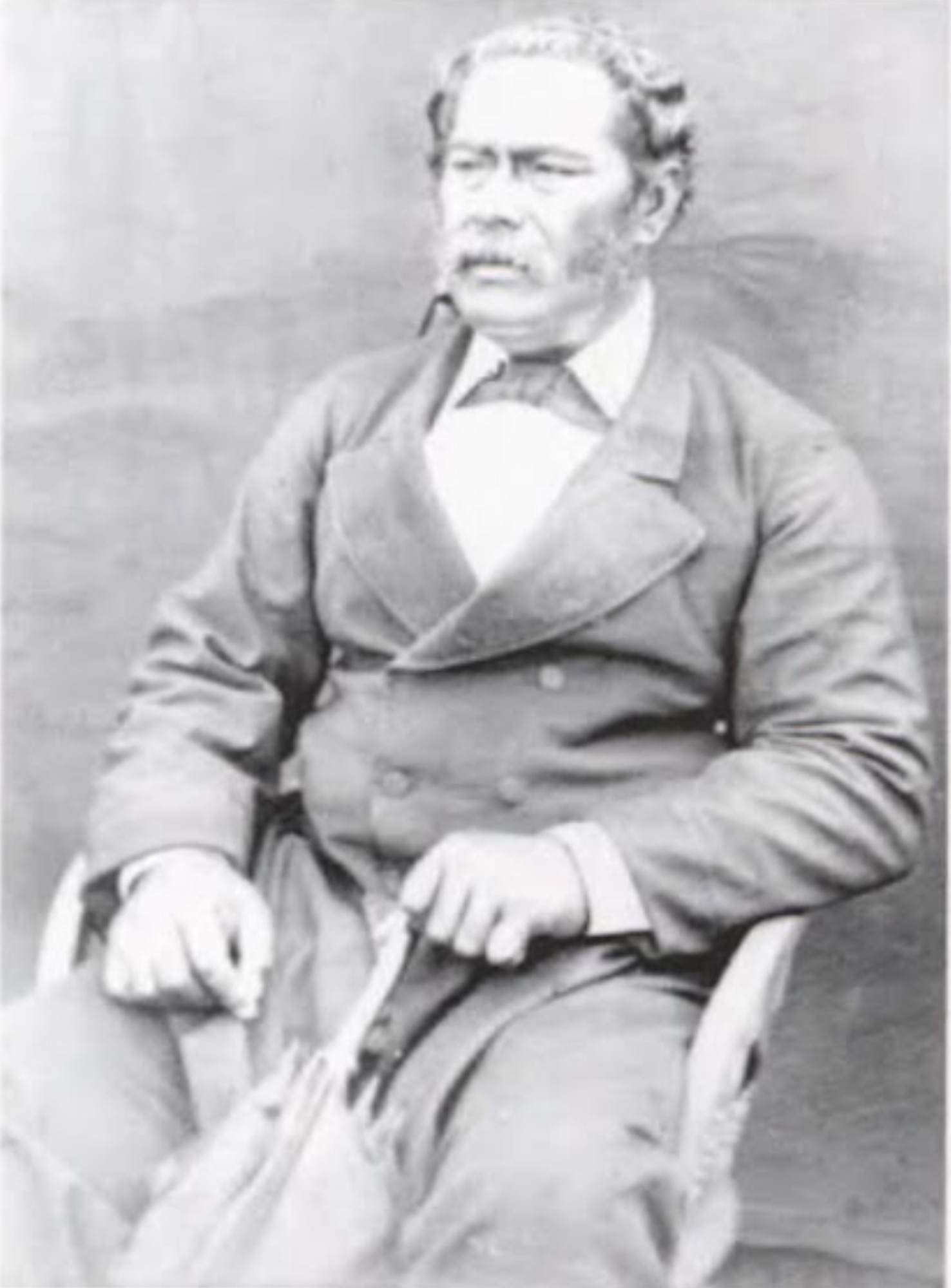
Siaosi Fatafehi Toutaitokotaha

Siaosi Fatafehi Toutaitokotaha, 1842–1912. He was the son of Filiaipulotu and the father of King George Tupou II. He was Prime Minister of Tonga in 1905. After his death the title remained vacant as the king had no need for it. Neither was there any need for the title during the reign of his successor, Queen Sālote Tupou III.

=== Fatafehi Tuʻi Faleua ===
Sione Ngū Manumataongo (7 January 1922 – 10 April 1999), was the youngest son of Queen Sālote Tupou III and The Prince Consort, ʻUiliami Mailefihi Tungi. Prince Sione was educated in Tonga and Australia. He attended Newington College, Sydney, (1941–1942) and an agricultural college in Queensland. Fatafehi married Melenaite Tupoumoheofo Veikune (13 November 1924 – 16 March 1993) on the same day as his older brother, the Crown Prince (in that time still called Tupoutoʻa-Tungī) married Halaevalu Mataʻaho ʻAhomeʻe. That was the famous double royal wedding (taʻane māhanga) of 10 June 1947. He received the titles of Tuʻi Pelehake and Fatafehi from his mother in 1944. He also received Tonga's second highest title-of-nobility, Tuʻi Faleua (King of the Second House) during this time. Prince John was also honoured with the CBE or Commander of the Order of the British Empire. The Prince inherited from his mother an artistic side; he was a well-known poet and composer.

He began a career in government service, alongside his elder brother, the Crown Prince Tupoutoʻa-Tungi. Prince Sione's first appointment was as the Governor of Vavaʻu i (1949–1952) and later as Governor of Haʻapai (1952–1953). He held various ministerial portfolios in cabinet, until he took over as prime minister in 1965. His brother had just vacated the Office of Prime Minister on becoming King. Prince Tuʻipelehake remained Tonga's Prime Minister until 1991 until he was forced to withdraw therefrom because of serious health problems. His last years were spent in a rollchair and on a life support system.

He kept the both titles of Tuʻi Pelehake and Tuʻi Faleua for so many years, that they became synonymous with him. But after his death, only the former was conferred to his son, while the latter returned to the king.

=== ʻUluvalu ===
Sione ʻUluvalu Takeivūlai Ngū Tukuʻaho (7 October 1950 – 6 July 2006) held the title of Tuʻi Pelehake from the death of his father in 1991 until his own death in 2006. Prince ʻUluvalu died in an automobile accident near San Francisco, California on 6 July 2006. He played a key role in mediating between the Government of Tonga and striking civil servants in 2005. At the time of his death he was in the US for consultations with Tongans living there concerning political and constitutional reforms. This programme of reforms was to have been presented to his uncle, King Taufaʻahau Tupou IV

to present ideas for political reform to his uncle, the king. Prince ʻUluvalu and his wife, Princess Kaimana, died without children.

They were buried at langi Nāmoala in Muʻa on 21 July, apparently as a reminder of the title's Tuʻi Tonga heritage, and not at Malaʻekula in Nukuʻalofa where all kings find their rest.

=== Mailefihi ===
When a title holder dies without heir, the title returns to the king, who then will decide what to do with it. In this case he decided to give it, on 21 July 2006, to ʻUluvalu's younger brother, Viliami Tupoulahi Mailefihi Tukuʻaho (17 June 1957 – 2014) known as Mailefihi. Mailefihi lost his right to the title 'Prince' and inherited claim to the royal throne with his first marriage to Mele Vikatolia Faletau, step daughter and adopted daughter of Hon. Akauola Inoke Faletau and birth daughter of Mrs. Evelini Hurrell - Akauaola. Mele Vikatolia is an issue from then the previous relationship of her biological mother, Evelini Hurrell during bachelorette. This marriage was against the wishes of his uncle King Tāufaʻāhau Tupou IV. From this first marriage he had two children a daughter and a son;

1. Hon. Taone Tukuʻaho
2. Hon. Ngū Tukuʻaho

To the dismay of the royal family his next two marriages were to particularly commers women. His second marriage in 1996 was to Maʻata Moʻungaloa, a beauty queen who won the yearly Miss Heilala beauty pageant. His third marriage was to ʻAlakifonua villager ʻEneʻio Tatafu styled HSH Princess Tuipelehake in 2008, whom he divorced in 2010. They had one adopted daughter:

Hon. Anaseini Takipo Michelle Alexdra Tukuʻaho

The His fourth and current wife is Fifita Holeva Tuʻihaʻangana, a member of one of the low noble families in Tonga from Haano, a tiny island in the Haapai group. Fifita Holeva have three issues from previous relationships.

Mailefihi returned to great prominence upon the death of his older brother ʻUluvalu in July 2006. Shortly after his brother's death he was bestowed the Tuʻipelehake title by his uncle King Tāufaʻāhau Tupou IV. In August of the same year via a by-election he won his brother's vacated seat in Parliament. In 2008 his 'Prince' title was restored back to him by his first cousin King George Tupou V and is known as His Serene Highness Prince Tuʻipelehake. In 2009 he became a Minister of the Realm when he was appointed Minister of Agriculture, Forestry and Fisheries. He died of complications from diabetes in June 2014.

Mailefihi died on Saturday 14 June 2014 at Vaiola Hospital in Tonga. It is understood Prince Tuipelehake was admitted to Vaiola Hospital on 2 June with complications from diabetes. Mailefihi had been a diabetes patient for a number of years, and had previously undergone amputation of both legs. He was 56.

=== Viliami Sione Ngu Takeivulai ===
On 8 July 2014, Hon. Viliami Sione Ngu Takeivulai Tukuʻaho (born 5 January 1986) was installed as His Serene Highness Prince Tuʻipelehake. He replaces his late father Prince Tuʻipelehake - Mailefihi, who died a month before on 14 June 2014. He was known as Sione Ngu who became 8th in line for the Tuʻipelehake title and he was installed at the Falelotu Fotu ʻa e ʻEiki in Pelehake. He is a military officer (Lieutenant) at His Majesty's Armed Forces (formerly as Tonga Defense Services). He was married to Cassandra Tuʻipelehake (formerly known as Hon. Cassandra Vaea Tukuʻaho. Cassandra was adopted by the Late Baron Vaea of Houma and his wife, Baroness Tuputupu Maʻafu-Vaea which is the parents of HM The Queen of Tonga. Cassandra is the daughter of Lord Vaea - formerly known as Hon. ʻAlipate Tuʻivanuavou Vaea, HM The Queen of Tonga's only brother. Cassandra is the natural granddaughter of Baron & Baroness Vaea. Cassandra, an issue of a previous relationship of then, Hon. Alipate Tuʻivanuavou Vaea when he was a bachelor by a commoner with High Chief ancestors bloodlines. His Serene Highness, Prince Tuʻipelehake married on 19 July 2008 at Polataʻane, and they have two children a son and a daughter; however were later divorced. Cassandra later became a Dame. Dame Cassandra Vaea with her investiture ceremony to the Dame of Grace on 29 Nov 2022 of the Ancient and Most Noble Order of St Lazarus at St. Barnabas Anglican Church, Roseneath, Wellington, New Zealand. Dame Cassandra Vaea is the Representative of the Order St Lazarus of Jerusalem to the Kingdom of Tonga.

1. Hon. Siaosi Tupoulahi Tukuaho
2. Hon. Melenaite Tupoumoheofo Tukuaho

== Bibliography ==
- Elizabeth Wood-Ellem, Queen Sālote of Tonga, Auckland University Press, 1999, and several other books
- Tonga Chronicle, 3 August 2006
