= ʻElisiva Fusipala Taukiʻonetuku (1912–1933) =

Princess Fusipala of Tonga
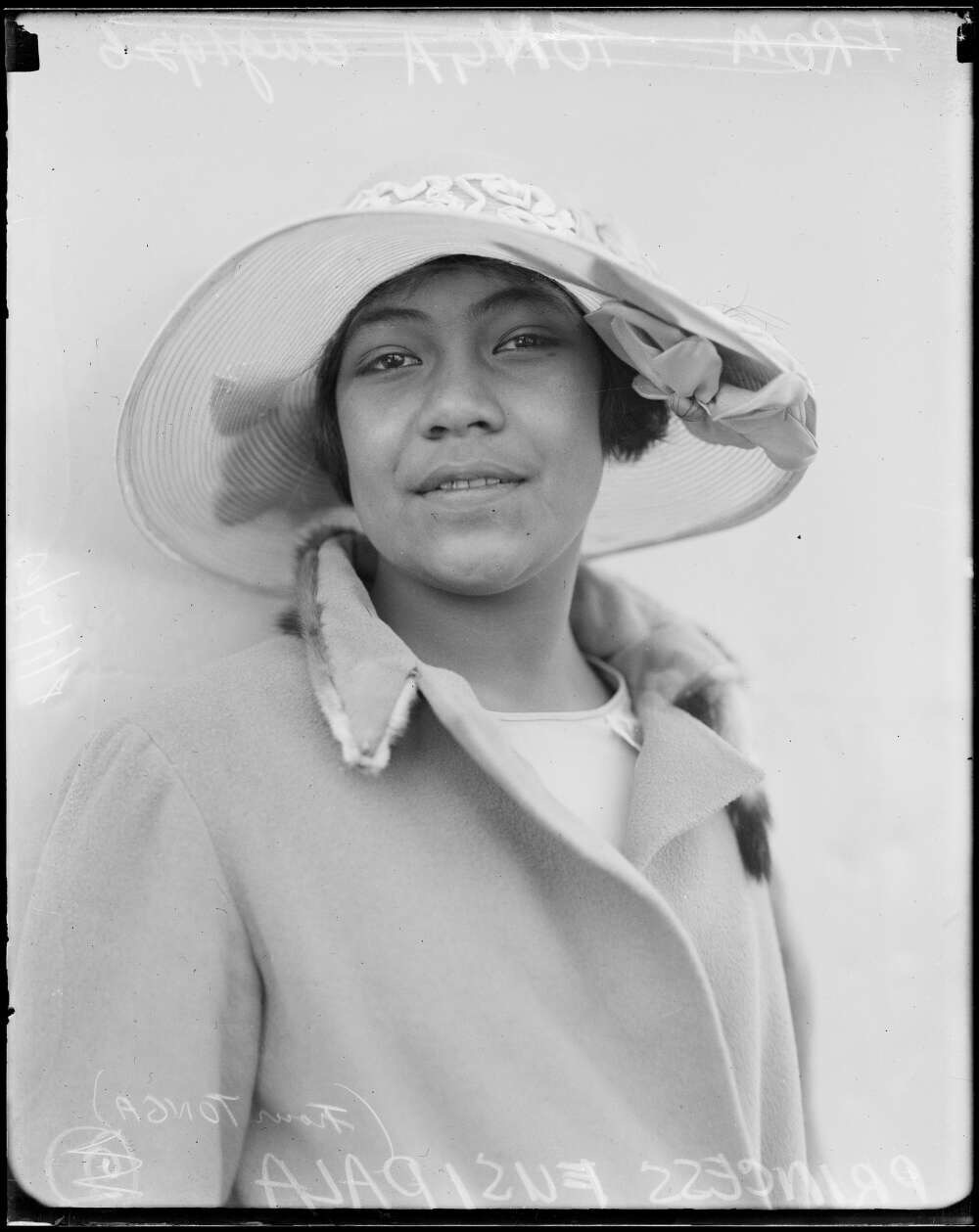
- Born: 26 July 1912; Royal Palace, Nukuʻalofa, Tonga
- Died: 21 April 1933 (aged 20); Burwood Private Hospital, Sydney, Australia
- Burial: Malaʻekula
Names
- ʻElisiva Fusipala Taukiʻonetuku
- House: House of Tupou
- Father: George Tupou II
- Mother: ʻAnaseini Takipō

ʻElisiva Fusipala Taukiʻonetuku, known as Fusipala, (26 July 1912 – 21 April 1933) was a Princess of Tonga and daughter of King George Tupou II and Queen ʻAnaseini Takipō.

== Life ==
Born on 26 July 1912, she was the second of two daughters born to King George Tupou II and his second wife Queen ʻAnaseini Takipō. She was named after her grandmother ʻElisiva Fusipala Taukiʻonetuku and her elder sister who died of convulsion shortly after her birth. Since her mother was unable to give birth to a male heir, Princess Fusipala's elder half-sister from her father's first marriage would succeed their father as Queen Sālote Tupou III in 1918.

In 1918, her mother Queen Dowager Takipō died as a result of the 1918 flu pandemic which killed eight percent of the population of Tonga. After her mother's death, Sālote assumed the guardianship of her half-sister Princess Fusipala. In 1920, she was sent abroad to be educated at the Anglican Diocesan School for Girls, Auckland and later continued her education at the Methodist Ladies' College, Melbourne. She became noted as an accomplished pianist at school.

Back home in Tonga, a rival court centered around her claim to the throne was set up by her maternal relatives against her sister, reviving the old rivalries between the family of Queen Sālote's mother Lavinia Veiongo and the family of Fusipala's mother. Many suitors from the chiefly lines of Tonga were forwarded to enhance her rank including Haʻamea ʻUlukālala, Lala Veikune, Havea Tuʻihaʻateiho, and Semisi Kalaniuvalu. Her health deteriorated during the on-and-off engagements and coercion from her aunt Muimui. When her aunt forced her into an engagement with Haʻamea, she refused to be married, with her sister supporting her wish. A proposal was considered to marry her to George Cakobau, a chief from Fiji before her death.

While in Australia for a health trip, Fusipala died on 21 April 1933 from tubercular peritonitis at the Burwood Private Hospital, in Sydney. At her deathbed was her brother-in-law Prince Viliami Tungī Mailefihi, who brought her embalmed remains back to Tonga where she was buried in the royal burial grounds at Malaʻekula, Nukuʻalofa.

== Bibliography ==
- Eustis, Nelson (1997). The King of Tonga: A Biography. Adelaide: Hobby Investment. ISBN 978-0-646-33077-8. OCLC 38837175.
- Wood-Ellem, Elizabeth (1999). Queen Sālote of Tonga: The Story of an Era 1900–1965. Auckland, N.Z: Auckland University Press. ISBN 978-0-8248-2529-4. OCLC 262293605.
