= Viliami Tupoulahi Mailefihi Tukuʻaho =

Tongan politician & rugby player (1957–2014)

Minister of Agriculture, Forestry and Fisheries
- In office 30 April 2009 – 4 January 2011
- Monarch: George Tupou V
- Prime Minister: Feleti Sevele
- Succeeded by: ʻAlipate Tuʻivanuavou Vaea

Personal details
- Born: 17 June 1957 Tonga
- Died: 14 June 2014 (aged 56) Nukuʻalofa

Rugby union career
- Position: Lock
National sevens team
Years	Team	Comps
1979–1982	Tonga 7s	
Coaching career
- Years: Team
- 1987–1995 (Manager): Tonga

Prince Viliami Tupoulahi Mailefihi Tukuʻaho (17 June 1957 – 14 June 2014) was a Tongan politician and Cabinet Minister, member of the royal family, and holder of the Tuʻipelehake prince title, one of the thirty three titles of the Tongan hereditary nobility.

== Title and Family ==
Viliami (William) Tukuʻaho was the youngest son of Prince Fatafehi Tuʻipelehake. He inherited the Tuʻipelehake title after his brother Prince Sione ʻUluvalu Ngu Takeivulai Tukuʻaho died in a car crash in the United States in July 2006. He was the seventh title holder since its institution in the 19th century.

He was married four times. In 1983 he married a commoner, Mele Vikatolia (Mary Victoria) Faletau, renouncing his princely title in order to do so. They had two children. His princely title was however restored by King George Tupou V in 2008. His fourth marriage, in January 2011, followed the divorce of his third wife, ʻEneʻio Tatafu. He then married Fifita Holeva Tuʻihaʻangana, from a noble family, Lord Tuʻihaʻangana's sister.

== Education ==
Mailefihi completed his studies at Queensland Agricultural College (part of the University of Queensland), in Australia, then at Oxford University, in the United Kingdom), where he obtained a Certificate of International Affairs, and finally a graduation in port and naval administration et navale at the Institute of Science and Technology at Wales University (currently named Cardiff University).

== Military, administrative and political career ==
He briefly served in the Tonga Defence Services from 1979 to 1981. He was the Military Liaison Officer at the Foreign Affairs Ministry from 1980 to 1981. From 1986 to 1992, he was the Director of the Navy Department.

He served as Noble Representative from Tongatapu from 2006 to 2007, then as Noble Representative from Haʻapai from 2008 to 2009. In 2009 he was appointed Minister of Agriculture, Forestry and Fisheries. Following the 2010 election he was not reappointed to Sialeʻataongo Tuʻivakanō's cabinet.

== Sports career ==
Mailefihi was a high level sportsman, being captain of the Tonga national rugby sevens team in the late 1970s. It was that team which won the golden medal at the 1979 Pacific Games in Suva, defeating Fiji, the host country, in the final. He was also the Tonga national rugby union team manager during the 1987, as 1995 World Cups.

== Death ==
Suffering from diabetes since several years, and after suffering an amputation of both legs due to this reason, he was hospitalised again at the beginning of June 2014 and died in hospital on 14 June.
