= Coronation of the Tongan monarch =

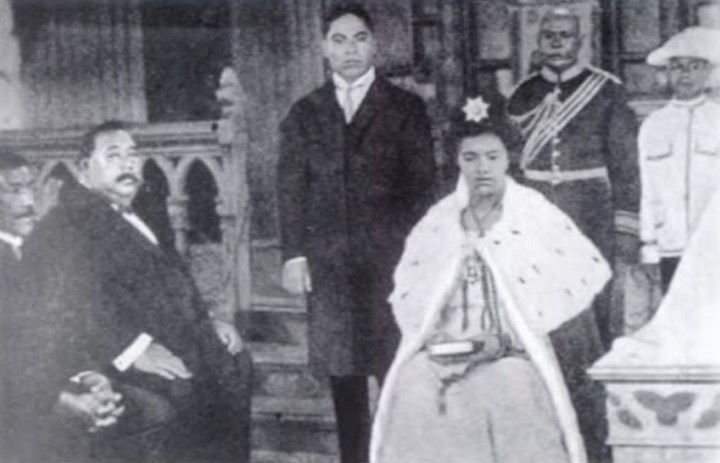
European-style coronation of Queen Sālote Tupou III, 11 October 1918.

The ancient kings of Tonga were always crowned at Kanakubolu, near Hihifo, where they took the title of Tuʻi Kanakubolu. The tree under which they sat was torn down in a gale in the 1890s; George Tupou II had pieces of wood from the fallen tree inlaid into the throne of Tonga. George and his successor, Sālote Tupou III, were crowned on 17 March 1893 and 11 October 1918, respectively. A European coronation ceremony had been introduced to the islands by Western missionaries, where it followed a centuries-old traditional Tongan rite involving the ritual drinking of kava by the new king, together with the receipt of dozens of cooked pigs and baskets of food.

In 1967 Tonga crowned king Tāufaʻāhau Tupou IV, while George Tupou V was crowned in 2008 and Tupou VI in 2015. All three monarchies participated in elaborate European-style coronation ceremonies complete with a large gold crown, sceptre, and throne.

== Sālote Tupou III ==
Sālote was proclaimed Queen on 6 April 1918, following her father's death from tuberculosis the previous day.

== Tāufaʻāhau Tupou IV ==
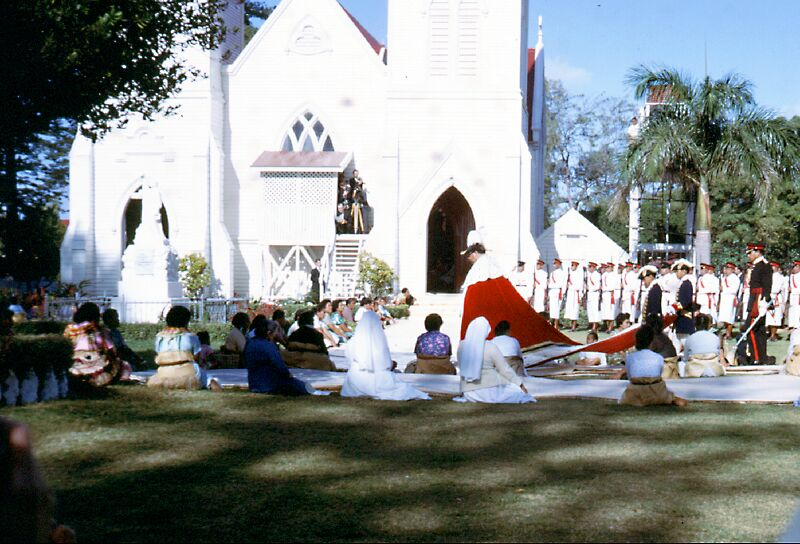
King Tāufaʻāhau Tupou IV entering the royal chapel for his coronation in 1967

Tungī ascended the throne on 16 December 1965, following the death of his mother. His coronation took place on 4 July 1967, his 49th birthday, at the royal chapel in Nukuʻalofa, in a service that combined Methodist and traditional Tongan customs. The coronation was attended by international dignitaries including the Duke of Kent and New Zealand Prime Minister Keith Holyoake.

== George Tupou V ==
The coronation of George Tupou V took place in the form of two ceremonies in July and August 2008. These were initially to be held in 2007 after the six-month official mourning period for his father (as required of close relatives) and his own birthday. They were also deferred after the 2006 Nukuʻalofa riots as he decided to focus instead on reconstruction of the damaged capital.

On 30 July 2008, a Taumafa Kava (royal kava ring) ceremony was held on Malaʻe Pangai, the open space to the east of the Royal Palace. During the ceremony, the king sat on a pile of handwoven pandanus mats in an open pavilion facing the sea, while more than 200 Tongan nobles and chiefs dressed in woven skirts and sea shells circled him. He wore the traditional Tongan taʻovala (woven mat skirt) and a garland of flowers. The ceremony included his formal recognition as the Tuʻi Kanokupolu, and the rightful descendant of King George Tupou I, who united Tonga in the 19th century. The ceremony involved having kava, hundreds of baskets of food, and seventy cooked pigs presented to the King and the assembly of chiefs and nobles.

Later that night, schoolchildren held 30,000 torches to proclaim the coronation in what is known as a tupakapakanava. The traditional torch spectacle was held at a spot overlooking the Pacific and is an ancient honour reserved solely for the Tongan sovereign and Royal Family.

A second, European-style coronation ceremony took place on 1 August 2008 in the Centennial Chapel, Nukuʻalofa. Anglican Archbishop of Polynesia Jabez Bryce invested George Tupou V with the Tongan regalia: the ring, sceptre and sword. During the culmination of the ceremony, Archbishop Bryce placed the Tongan Crown on the monarch's head. Royalty and nobility from around the world were in attendance. The Christian character of Tonga's monarchy was reiterated as Anglican Archbishop of Polynesia Jabez Bryce anointed King George Tupou V with sacred chrism, just as in the British rite. However, the Master of the Royal Household, the Honourable Tuʻivauavou, described the kava ritual (as opposed to the Western-style ceremony) as "the true coronation", a sentiment echoed by royal spokesman Maʻu Kakala.

== Tupou VI ==
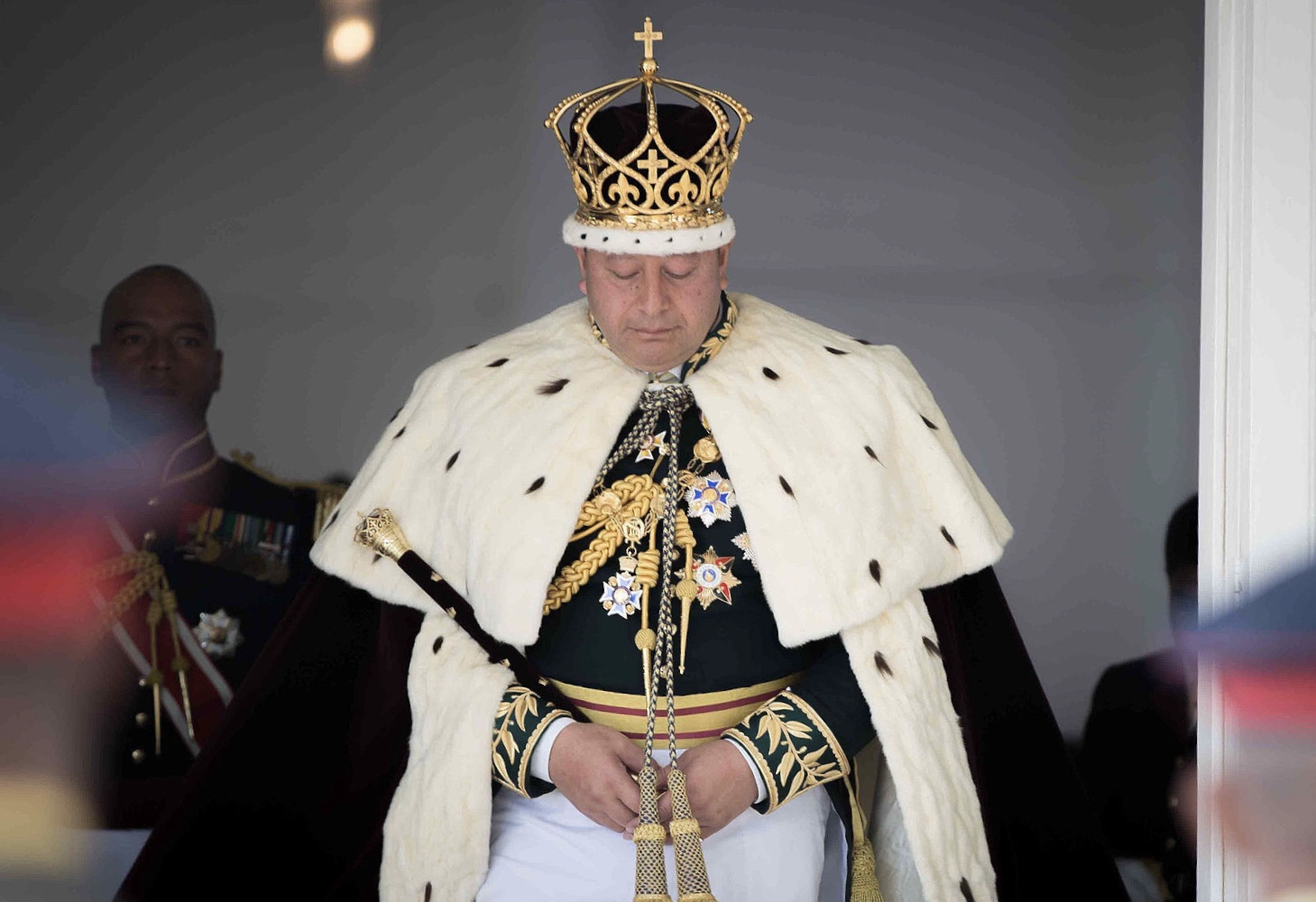
King Tupou VI after his coronation ceremony in Nukuʻalofa on 4 July 2015

The coronation of King Tupou VI and Queen Nanasipauʻu took place at Centenary Church in Nukuʻalofa on 4 July 2015 and was conducted by the Reverend D'Arcy Wood, a retired Uniting Church in Australia minister who was born in Tonga. He was assisted by the Reverend ʻAhio and the Reverend Tevita Havea, the president and the secretary general of the Free Wesleyan Church of Tonga. About 15,000 guests attended the ceremony.

During the ceremony, Tupou VI was anointed with holy oil, adorned with a ring, and presented with a sceptre. The crown was then placed on his head by Wood, who performed the anointing and crowning as a matter of circumventing the taboo on native Tongans touching the King's head. The celebrations ran for a total of eleven days, beginning a week before the ceremony.

== See also ==
- Monarchies in Oceania
