= Tāufaʻāhau Tupou IV =

King of Tonga from 1965 to 2006

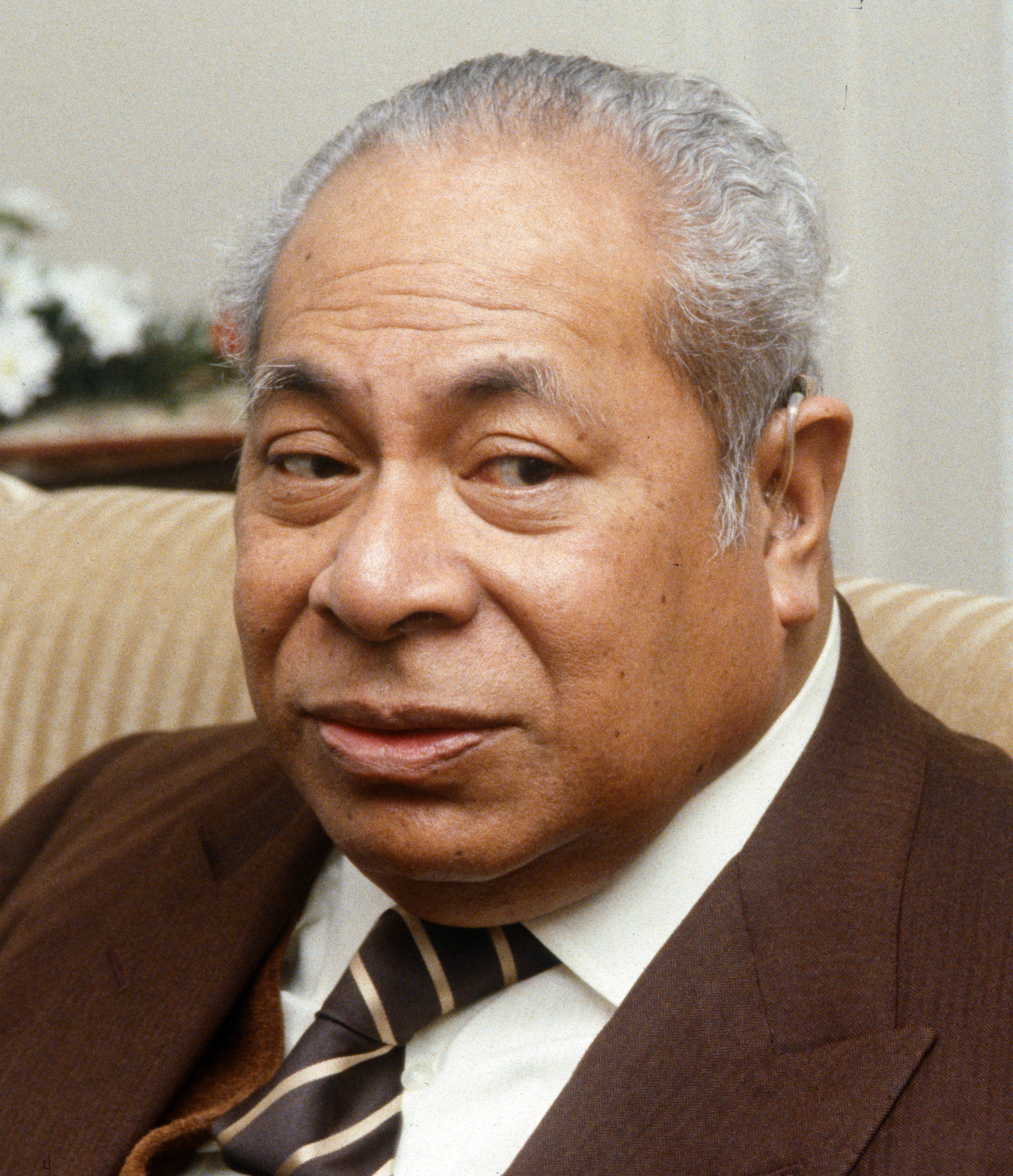
- Tupou in 1985

King of Tonga
- Reign: 16 December 1965 – 10 September 2006
- Coronation: 4 July 1967
- Predecessor: Sālote Tupou III
- Successor: George Tupou V
- Prime Ministers: See list: Prince Fatafehi Tuʻipelehake Baron Siaosi Vaea Prince ʻUlukālala Lavaka Ata Feleti Sevele

Prime Minister of Tonga
- In office 12 December 1949 – 16 December 1965
- Monarch: Sālote Tupou III
- Preceded by: Solomone Ula Ata
- Succeeded by: Prince Fatafehi Tuʻipelehake
- Born: 4 July 1918; Royal Palace, Nukuʻalofa, Kingdom of Tonga
- Died: 10 September 2006 (aged 88); Auckland, New Zealand
- Burial: 19 September 2006; Malaʻekula, Tonga
- Spouse: Halaevalu Mataʻaho ʻAhomeʻe (m. 1947)
- Issue: George Tupou V; Salote, Princess Royal; Prince Fatafehi ʻAlaivahamamaʻo Tukuʻaho; Tupou VI
- House: Tupou
- Father: Viliami Tungī Mailefihi
- Mother: Sālote Tupou III
- Religion: Free Wesleyan Church

Tāufaʻāhau Tupou IV (Siaosi Tāufaʻāhau Tupoulahi; 4 July 1918 – 10 September 2006) was King of Tonga from 1965 until his death in 2006. He was also Prime Minister of Tonga from 1949 until his accession as king.

Tupou was the tallest and heaviest Tongan monarch, weighing 209.5 kg (462 lb) and measuring 196 cm (6 ft 5 in).

== Early life and education ==
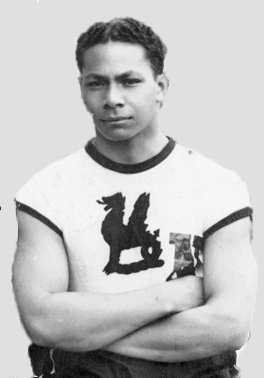
Tāufaʻāhau as a student at Newington College

He was born to Viliami Tungī Mailefihi and Queen Sālote Tupou III. His full baptismal name was Siaosi (George) Tāufaʻāhau Tupoulahi, but he became better known by the noble title Tupoutoʻa, which was bestowed upon him in 1935 and was subsequently reserved for crown princes of Tonga. This title was supplemented by the one he inherited from his father, Tungī (or using both: Tupoutoʻa Tungī; archaic spelling: Tuboutoʻa Tugi). He kept the Tungī title until his death. From a traditional point of view he was not only the Tungī, which is the direct descendant from the Tuʻi Haʻatakalaua, but he was also, on becoming king, the 22nd Tuʻi Kanokupolu. The link with the Tuʻi Tonga line, however, was more indirect. He was not a Tuʻi Tonga in his own right (the office having gone over into the Kalaniuvalu line), but his grandmother Lavinia Veiongo (wife of George Tupou II) was the great-granddaughter of Laufilitonga, the last Tuʻi Tonga, and his wife Halaevalu Mataʻaho (not to be confused with the King's wife of the same name and same family), who was the daughter of Tupou ʻAhomeʻe, who was the daughter of Lātūfuipeka, the Tamahā (sister of the Tuʻi Tonga). By consequence, his children all descended from the bloodlines of the three major historical royal dynasties of Tonga.

He was educated first at Tupou College, then continued his studies at Newington College in Australia. He thereafter studied law at Sydney University while residing at Wesley College. His graduation from Sydney University was described as the first of any Tongan.

== Cabinet minister ==
In 1943, the crown prince was appointed minister of education by his mother, Queen Sālote. He was made minister of health in 1944, and ultimately prime minister in 1949, while also serving as minister of agriculture, communications and foreign affairs. During his tenure as education minister, he initiated reforms to standardise the Tongan alphabet and in 1959, his government approved the publication of a bilingual Tongan-English dictionary. He also supervised the establishment of the Tonga Chronicle and the Tonga Broadcasting Commission.

In 1964, Tungī visited the United Kingdom for negotiations regarding the future independence of Tonga. He requested that the Colonial Office grant Tonga permission to appoint its own diplomats to Britain and the United States. The British government declined, citing cost concerns.

== Reign ==
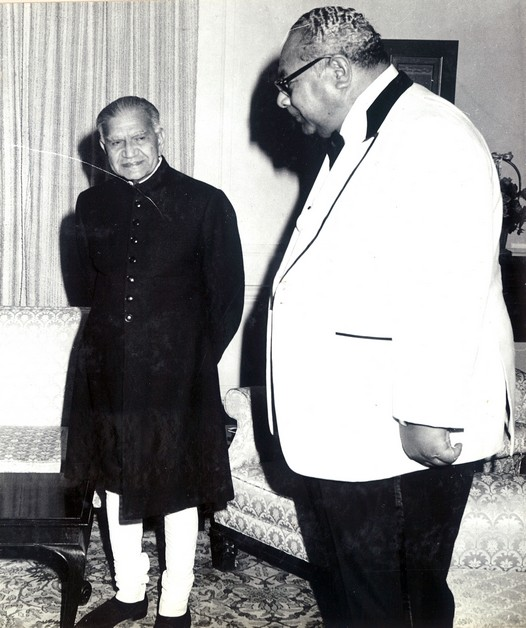
The King with President of India Fakhruddin Ali Ahmed, 1976

Tungī ascended the throne on 16 December 1965, following the death of Queen Sālote. He continued negotiating with the UK to arrange Tonga's transition to an independent state within the Commonwealth. His coronation took place on 4 July 1967, his 49th birthday, at the royal chapel in Nukuʻalofa, in a service that combined Methodist and traditional Tongan customs. The coronation was attended by international dignitaries including the Duke of Kent and New Zealand Prime Minister Keith Holyoake. On 4 June 1970, he presided over a ceremony marking the end of the British protectorate over Tonga.

As head of state, Tupou visited many far-flung countries and modernised Tonga's contact with the outside world. Along with Crown Prince Tupoutoʻa, he adopted a policy of appeasement towards France regarding its Pacific nuclear tests at Moruroa during the 1980s, which were met with criticism in other Pacific countries. He visited Moruroa twice and was invited by Gaston Flosse to visit Tahiti.

Towards the end of his reign, increasing authoritarianism within Tonga's essentially aristocratic system of government, coupled with the influence of the monarchy and nobles in politics and the economy, led to the formation of a pro-democracy movement in Tonga. The king had dismissed calls for democratisation of the political system, citing political crises in neighbouring Fiji.

In 2001, an investment scandal involving his American financial advisor Jesse Bogdonoff attracted much media attention; the fact he had previously appointed Bogdonoff the official court jester, though likely only done as a joke for Bogdonoff's birthday on 1 April (April Fools' Day), compounded the scandal's embarrassment.

Another controversy emerged in 2003, when his government banned an independent newspaper, the Times of Tonga published in New Zealand, and later attempted to amend the constitution to restrict freedom of the press after the chief justice issued a ruling against the ban. The following year, Reporters Without Borders named him a press freedom predator, a move which was criticised by the owner of another independent newspaper in Tonga.

In 2005, the government spent several weeks negotiating with striking civil service workers before reaching a settlement. The king's nephew, ʻUluvalu (the 6th Tuʻipelehake), served as mediator. A constitutional commission presented a series of recommendations for constitutional reform to the King near the end of his reign.

== Illness and death ==
Tāufaʻāhau suffered from heart and age-related problems in his final years, which necessitated medical care in New Zealand. In 2001, he used a wheelchair during a public appearance to close the Legislative Assembly. His children – Crown Prince Tupoutoʻa, Princess Pilolevu and then-Prime Minister Prince ʻUlukālala Lavaka Ata – were each appointed regent at various times in his absence. He returned to Tonga intermittently, with his last such visit being in early July 2006 for his 88th birthday.

On 15 August 2006, Tongan Prime Minister Feleti Sevele interrupted radio and television broadcasts to announce the king was gravely ill and to ask the 104,000 people of the island chain to pray for their monarch. Tāufaʻāhau died at the Mercy Hospital in Auckland on 10 September at 23:34 NZST, (Note: The time of his death in Tonga was 00:34 (UTC+13:00) on 11 September.) with the Queen, Princess Pilolevu and other members of the royal family by his bedside according to an official statement by the Lord Chamberlain. He was succeeded by his eldest son, George Tupou V.

Having reigned for nearly 41 years, he was the fourth longest-serving incumbent head of state after King Bhumibol Adulyadej of Thailand, Queen Elizabeth II, and Samoa's head of state Malietoa Tanumafili II.

Following his death, Tonga entered a month-long period of national mourning, with the royal family and court observing a longer mourning period of six months. After a period of lying in state at his residence of ʻAtalanga in Epsom, his body was taken to Tonga on 13 September by a Lockheed C-130 Hercules owned by the Royal New Zealand Air Force, also carrying members of the Tongan diaspora for the funeral.

Tāufaʻāhau's state funeral was held on 19 September. It included a procession through Nukuʻalofa and a burial service at Malaʻekula, the royal cemetery in Tongatapu, which blended Christian and ancient Polynesian burial rites. A crowd of around 10,000 attended the funeral, which was overseen by the royal undertaker and his men, known as the nima tapu. Mourners included foreign dignitaries from 30 countries, among them Australian governor-general Michael Jeffery; New Zealand governor-general Dame Silvia Cartwright and prime minister Helen Clark; Fijian vice-president Ratu Joni Madraiwiwi and prime minister Laisenia Qarase; Vanuatu president Kalkot Mataskelekele; governor of American Samoa Togiola Tulafono; Niue premier Young Vivian; president of French Polynesia Oscar Temaru; Japanese crown prince Naruhito; and the Duke of Gloucester, a cousin of Queen Elizabeth's.

== Personal life and family ==
Tāufaʻāhau was a keen sportsman in his youth, engaging in rugby, tennis, cricket and rowing, and an admirer of Otto von Bismarck. He remained a lay preacher of the Free Wesleyan Church and in some circumstances, was empowered to appoint an acting church president.

He married a distant relative, Halaevalu Mataʻaho ʻAhomeʻe (1926–2017), on 10 June 1947, during a double nuptial ceremony with his brother Prince Fatafehi Tuʻipelehake. The couple had four children:

- King George Tupou V (Siaosi Tāufaʻāhau Manumataongo Tukuʻaho Tupou; 1948–2012), better known during his tenure as heir by the hereditary noble title Tupoutoʻa.
- Princess Royal Salote Mafileʻo Pilolevu Tuita (née Tukuʻaho; born 1951)
- Prince Fatafehi ʻAlaivahamamaʻo Tukuʻaho (1954–2004); stripped of his title after marrying a commoner, later bestowed with the hereditary title of Māʻatu.
- King Tupou VI (ʻAhoʻeitu ʻUnuakiʻotonga Tukuʻaho; born 1959), known prior to his ascension to the throne by his hereditary titles: ʻUlukālala Lavaka Ata, then after his elder brother's ascension, Tupoutoʻa Lavaka. As his brother died without legitimate issue, he became king in 2012.

=== Weight ===
At one point in the 1970s, Tāufaʻāhau was the heaviest monarch in the world, weighing in at 209.5 kg (462 lb). For his visits to Germany, the German government used to commission special chairs that could support his weight. The king used to take them home, considering them as state presents. He was also very tall, standing at 196 cm (6 ft 5 in). Swedish shoemaker Per-Enok Kero reported that he "weighed 180 kilos and had shoe size 47 in length and 52 in breadth." In the 1990s, he took part in a national fitness campaign, losing a third of his weight. By 2003, his weight had been reduced to 140 kg (310 lb).

== Honours ==
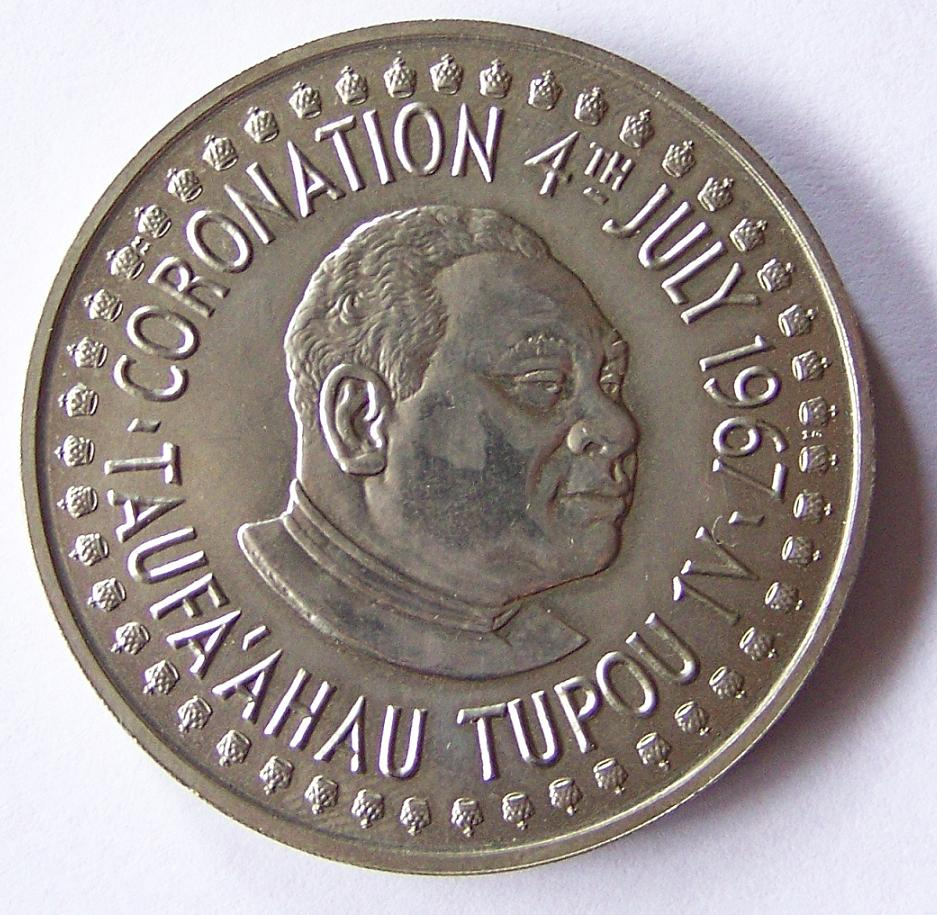
2 paʻanga coin commemorating Tāufaʻāhau Tupou IV's coronation in 1967

=== National ===
- Sovereign Knight Grand Cross with Collar of the Royal Order of Pouono
- Sovereign Knight Grand Cross of the Order of King George Tupou I
- Sovereign Knight Grand Cross with Collar of the Order of the Crown of Tonga
- Sovereign Recipient of the Royal Tongan Medal of Merit
- Sovereign Recipient of the Tongan Red Cross Medal

=== Foreign ===
- Denmark: Recipient of the Royal Medal of Recompense
- France: Grand Cross of the Order of the Legion of Honour (11 January 1980)
- Germany: Grand Cross of the Order of Merit of the Federal Republic of Germany, Special Class (2 December 1977)
- French Polynesia: Grand Cross of the Order of Tahiti Nui (4 March 1997)
- Japan: Knight Grand Cordon with Collar of the Order of the Chrysanthemum
- Republic of China (Taiwan): Grand Cross of the Order of Brilliant Jade
- United Kingdom: Knight Grand Cross of the Order of St Michael and St George (1977)
- United Kingdom: Knight Grand Cross of the Royal Victorian Order (1970)
- United Kingdom: Knight Commander of the Most Excellent Order of the British Empire (1958)
- United Kingdom: Bailiff Grand Cross of the Venerable Order of Saint John
- United Kingdom: Recipient of the Medal of Merit of the Legion of Frontiersmen
- United Kingdom: Recipient of the Queen Elizabeth II Silver Jubilee Medal
- World Peace Prize (1997)

=== Namesakes ===
- Tonga House at Newington College

== Family tree ==
Tupou family tree

Tuʻi Haʻatakalaua line	Tuʻi Tonga line	Tuʻi Kanokupolu line
Kalolaine Fusimatalili	George Tupou I	Fīnau Kaunanga
Fifita Vavʻau	Tēvita ʻUnga	Sālote Mafile‘o Pilolevu	Filiaipulotu
Fusipala Taukiʻonetuku	Fatafehi Toutaitokotaha
Lavinia Veiongo	George Tupou II	ʻAnaseini Takipō
Viliami Tungī Mailefihi	Sālote Tupou III	Vīlai Tupou (illegitimate son)	Tupou Seini
Tāufaʻāhau Tupou IV	Halaevalu Mataʻaho ʻAhomeʻe	Siaosi 'Alipate Tupou, Baron Vaea	Tuputupu Ma'afu-'o-Tukuialahi
George Tupou V	Tupou VI	Nanasipauʻu Tukuʻaho
ʻIlima Lei Fifita Tohi (illegitimate daughter)	Tupoutoʻa ʻUlukalala	Sinaitakala Fakafanua
Taufaʻahau Manumataongo

- Fox, James J.; Sather, Clifford (1996). Origins, Ancestry and Alliance: Explorations in Austronesian Ethnography. Canberra: Department of Anthropology, Australian National University. p. 252. ISBN 978-0-7315-2432-7. OCLC 245762652.
- Kaeppler, Adrienne Lois; D.C. (2008). The Pacific Arts of Polynesia and Micronesia. Oxford: Oxford University Press. p. 90. ISBN 978-0-19-284238-1. OCLC 236158882.
- Völkel, Svenja (2010). Social Structure, Space and Possession in Tongan Culture and Language: An Ethnolinguistic Study. Amsterdam; Philadelphia: John Benjamins Publishing. p. 45. ISBN 978-90-272-0283-3.
- Wood-Ellem, Elizabeth (1999). Queen Sālote of Tonga: The Story of an Era 1900-1965. Auckland, N.Z: Auckland University Press. p. front. ISBN 978-0-8248-2529-4. OCLC 262293605.

== Notes ==
Tāufaʻāhau Tupou IV House of Tupou Born: 4 July 1918 Died: 10 September 2006
Titles of nobility
Preceded by Sione Mateialona Tupou	2nd Chief Tupoutoʻa; 1936–1966	Succeeded by George Tupou V
Political offices
Preceded by Solomone Ula Ata	Prime Minister of Tonga; 1949–1965	Succeeded by Fatafehi Tuʻipelehake
Regnal titles
Preceded by Sālote Tupou III	King of Tonga; 1965–2006	Succeeded by George Tupou V
