= ʻUluvalu =

Sione ʻUluvalu Ngū Takeivūlai Tukuʻaho (7 October 1950 – 5 July 2006 (6 July in Tonga)) became the Tuʻi Pelehake, an hereditary title in the kingdom of Tonga, after the death of his father in 1999.

As his father was the brother of King Tāufaʻāhau Tupou IV, he had the right to carry the 'his royal highness' title as well. He had one younger brother and four sisters.

ʻUluvalu married his first wife Salote Tu'ipulotu daughter of Felise Mu'a Mo Kama Eiki Tu'ipulotu and Melelua Tu'ipulotu on April 17th 1982 at the Heart of Reno Chapel in Reno, Nevada. Together they had one son prior to their marriage, 'Osaiasi Funganimapa 'Uluvalu Tu'ipulotu born on April 5, 1973. They later divorced on June 21, 1984. Uluvalu then remarried on the 28th of November 1998, with Kaimana Aleamotuʻa (12 March 1960 — 5 July 2006); the couple had no children. He became a parliamentarian, the Haʻapai representative of the nobles, but often backing the representatives of the people and the pro-democracy movement, many of whom felt he should succeed the ailing king. He was a leading pro-democracy advocate within the royal family. Radio New Zealand article Tuʻi Pelehake (ʻUluvalu) was dubbed the "prince of the people" by ordinary Tongans.

He died prematurely at age 55, along with his wife, 45, and driver, Vinisia Hefa, 36, in a car accident on Highway 101 in Menlo Park, California, near San Francisco, where he was meeting with Tongan citizens to discuss reforms. Edith Delgado, 18, driving a Ford Mustang, caused the crash when her car struck the side of the red Ford Explorer that the royal couple were riding in. The Explorer lost control and rolled over several times, killing all inside. Delgado's car was speeding up to 100 mph (160 km/h) and was possibly racing other cars on the highway at the time. Though she was not hurt in the accident, she was arrested at the scene. She pleaded not guilty at the first court hearing, but was jailed with a bail bond of $3 million. Attorneys for Delgado appealed the bond amount, which was 10 times larger than court guidelines suggested, and on September 11, 2006, the California Court of Appeal overturned the bail, finding there was no justification given in the original order for such a high amount, and ordered a new hearing September 13. She was convicted of three counts of misdemeanor vehicular manslaughter in June and sentenced on 24 August 2007, to two years in county jail. She had faced a maximum of three years after being acquitted of more serious felony charges. In addition, she was ordered to pay restitution of an undetermined amount to the victims' families and serve three years of supervised probation.
