= Hahano-ki-Malaʻe Kula-ʻa Sione Ngu Namoa, Lord Vahaʻi =

Tongan legislative assembly member

Hahano-ki-Malaʻe Kula-'a Sione Ngū Namoa (1 May 1936 – 22 May 2005), who became Lord Vahaʻi on the death of his father in 1985, was a member of the legislative assembly (MLA) of Tonga for the nobles, and the husband of Princess 'Elisiva Fusipala Vaha'i who was the granddaughter of Queen Salote Tupou III. The title Lord Vahaʻi implies being the estate holder of the village of Foʻui in Hihifo District.

Hahano's father was Vilisoni Fahitaha Namoawhile his mother was Vika Mafileʻo. His father became Lord Vaha'i on the death of his grandfather, and his mother was styled Vika Mafile'o Namoa Vaha'i from that point on. Up until the death of his own father he was referred to generally as Hahano. He was educated at Newington College in Australia and then served several years as a clerk in the justice and education departments of Tonga. In 1986 he succeeded his father as the Vaha'i of Fo'ui. He was elected an MLA in 1987 and served one term, returning to office again in 2002.

He and his wife, Princess Fusipala, had four children.
