= ʻElisiva Fusipala Vahaʻi =

Princess Fusipala Vaha'i of Tonga
- Born: 12 June 1949; Nukuʻalofa, Tonga
- Died: 2 October 2014 (aged 65); San Francisco, California, U.S.
- Spouse: Hahano-ki-Malaʻe Kula-ʻa Sione Ngu Namoa, Lord Vahaʻi
- Issue: Nikotimasi Fatafehi Laufilitonga Kakau Vahaʻi
Names
- ʻElisiva Fusipala Taukiʻonetuku Tukuʻaho
- House: Tupou
- Father: Prince Sione Ngu Tuʻi Pelehake
- Mother: Melenaite Tupou-Moheofo Veikune
- Religion: Mormonism

Princess 'Elisiva Fusipala Tauki'onetuku Tuku'aho Vaha'i of Tonga (12 June 1949 – 2 October 2014), normally referred to as Princess Fusipala or even just Fusipala, was a daughter of Fatafehi Tuʻipelehake. Fusipala was one of the Tuʻi Pelehake's six children, four of whom were girls.

On the occasion of her marriage to Hahano-ki-Mala'e Kula-'a Sione Ngu Namoa, Lord Vaha'i (1936–2005), the Vahaʻi of Foʻui, a member of the Tongan nobility, John H. Groberg, then the mission president of the Church of Jesus Christ of Latter-day Saints (LDS Church) in Tonga, gave Fusipala and Hahano a copy of the Standard Works of the LDS Church as a wedding present. This was in 1968.

In 1989 Fusipala joined the LDS Church. ʻIsileli T. Kongaika, who was president of the Tongan Mission at the time of Fusipala's baptism, said that she was the first member of Tonga's royal family to join the LDS Church. Her main period of learning about the denomination was while visiting Sepiuta and Larripotoa Fehoko in Santa Ana, California. The Fehokos took Fusipala to church with them at the Santa Ana 6th (Tongan-speaking) branch. Her instruction in the gospel was done by branch president Heilala T. Finau.

== Marriage and descent ==
Princess 'Elisiva Fusipala Tauki'onetuku Tuku'aho married at the Chapel Royal, Nuku'alofa, Tongatapu, 13 March 1968, Hahano-ki-Mala'e Kula-'a Sione Ngu Namoa, Lord Vaha'i, of Fo'ui (b. at Kolosi'i, Fo'ui, Tongatapu, 1 May 1936; d. at Middlemore Hospital, Auckland, New Zealand, 22 May 2005), sometime MLA, eldest son of Vilisoni Fahitaha Namoa, Vaha'i, of Foui, by his wife, Vika Kaufusi Vaha'i, daughter of Tevita 'Unga Taufu'-i-'aevalu, of Koulo, Lifuka.

She has issue, two sons and two daughters:

- Nikotimasi Fatafehi Laufilitonga Kakau Vahaʻi (born 13 September 1971); married Va'etu'ikoloa Amelia Tunakaimanu Tuita-Vaha'i. They have six children; 3 daughters & 3 sons. Fusipala Tukuofo Kihe Hau, Fatafehi Nikotimasi Laufilitonga Kakau Jnr who is the heir to the Vaha'i title; Vika Kaufusi Mafile’o Vahai, Amethyst Tukumuli-Ki-Uvea Vaha'i, Aidan Utoikamanu Vaha'i and the youngest Tu’ihalafatai Vaha’i.
- Siosifa ʻAlematea Vahaʻi; married Dr. Veisinia Matoto Vaha'i and they have one daughter, Jordan Lavinia Veiongo Matoto Vaha'i.
- ʻElisiva Taukiʻonetuku Vete, née Vahaʻi. oo Semi Vete Jnr. She has three children: two daughters, Melenaite Tupou Moheofo Vaha'i and Simone, and a son, Hirohito Vete.
- Sinaitakala ʻOfeina Leanahola Vahaʻi

== Honours ==
=== Orders ===
- King George Tupou V Royal Family Order (1.8.2011)

=== Medals ===
- King Taufa’ahau Tupou IV Coronation Silver Jubilee Medal (4.7.1992)
- King George Tupou V Coronation Medal (1.8.2008)

== Sources ==
- Groberg, John H. The Fire of Faith. (Salt Lake City: Bookcraft, 1996) p. 122. ISBN 978-1570088773
- "Tonga Marks LDS Centennial with Nationwide Celebrations", Ensign: 106–07, November 1991
