= Sālote Tupou III =

Queen of Tonga from 1918 to 1965

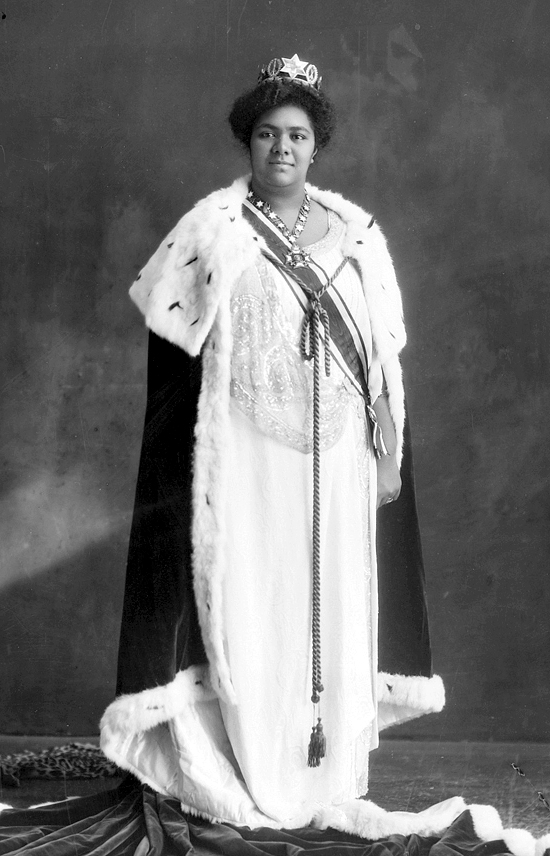
- Queen Sālote in her coronation robe

Queen of Tonga
- Reign: 5 April 1918 – 16 December 1965
- Coronation: 11 October 1918, Nukuʻalofa
- Predecessor: George Tupou II
- Successor: Tāufaʻāhau Tupou IV
- Prime Ministers: See List: Hon. Tevita Tuʻivakano Prince Tungī Hon. Solomone Ula Ata Crown Prince Tupoutoʻa Tungī
- Born: 13 March 1900; Royal Palace, Nukuʻalofa, Tonga
- Died: 16 December 1965 (aged 65); Aotea Hospital, Auckland, New Zealand
- Burial: 23 December 1965; Malaʻekula, Tonga
- Spouse: Prince Viliami Tungī Mailefihi (m. 1917; died 1941)
- Issue: Tāufaʻāhau Tupou IV; Prince Uiliami Tukuʻaho; Prince Fatafehi Tu'ipelehake
Names
- Sālote Mafileʻo Pilolevu
- House: Tupou
- Father: George Tupou II
- Mother: Lavinia Veiongo
- Religion: Free Wesleyan Church

Sālote Tupou III (born Sālote Mafileʻo Pilolevu; 13 March 1900 – 16 December 1965) was Queen of Tonga from 1918 to her death in 1965. She reigned for nearly 48 years, the longest of any Tongan monarch. Her rule of Tonga has been characterized as a golden age for Tonga. She was well known for her height, being 6 ft 3 in (191 cm) tall in her prime.

== Early life and education ==
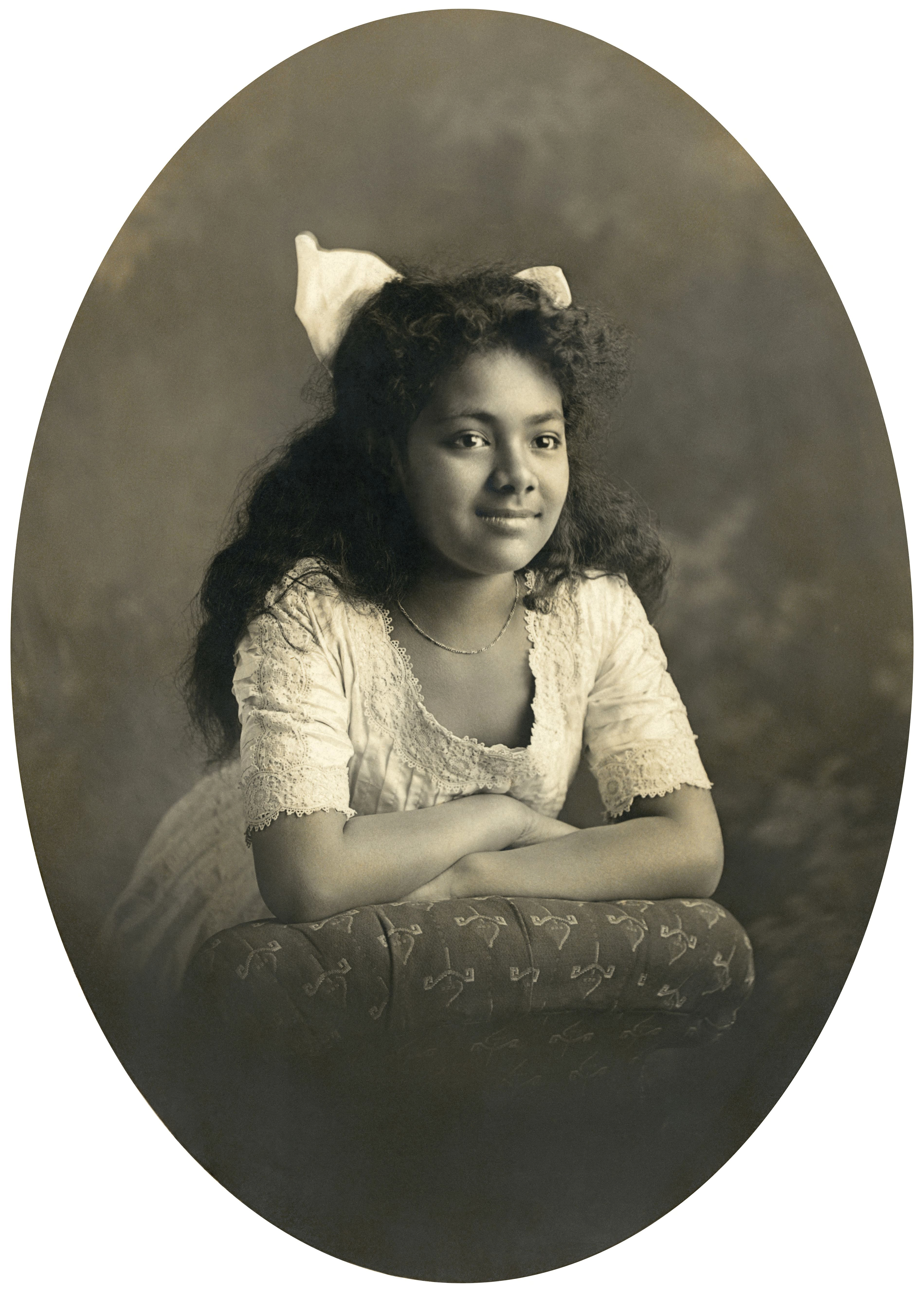
Sālote as a child in 1908

Sālote (Charlotte) was born on 13 March 1900 in Tonga as the eldest daughter and heir of King George Tupou II of Tonga and his first wife Queen Lavinia Veiongo. She was baptized and named after her great-grandmother Sālote Mafileʻo Pilolevu (daughter of George Tupou I). The young princess was the source of some hostility due to the nature of her parents' marriage.

Her mother, Queen Lavinia, died from tuberculosis on 24 April 1902. After her death, the Chiefs in Tonga urged King George Tupou II for many years to remarry to produce a male heir. On 11 November 1909, when the King finally married the 16-year-old ʻAnaseini Takipō (half-sister of the rejected candidate ʻOfakivavaʻu from the first search of a wife for the King), the chiefs were jubilant. Queen Anaseni gave birth twice, both girls: Princess ʻOnelua (born 20 March 1911; died of convulsions aged six months, on 19 August 1911) and Princess ʻElisiva Fusipala Taukiʻonetuku (born 26 July 1912; died from tubercular peritonitis on 21 April 1933 aged 20).

Tongan tradition allowed offspring from previous marriages to be killed. In order to protect her, the King sent Sālote away to Auckland in December 1909. She stayed with a family called Kronfeld and would maintain this connection throughout her life. She was educated for five years in New Zealand.

In 1913, Sālote was sent to the Anglican Diocesan School for Girls, a boarding school in Epsom, New Zealand. She would study there for two years before being ordered to stay in Tonga. Although the King wanted Sālote to continue her education, the chiefs convinced him otherwise. Queen Takipō had not given birth to a son and hence according to the Constitution of 1875, after her fifteenth birthday, Sālote became the heir presumptive to the Tongan throne.

== Marriage ==
In 1917, Sālote married Viliami Tungī Mailefihi, an adult noble then 30 years old, 13 years her senior. Her marriage had been a political masterstroke by her father, as Tungī was a direct descendant of the Tuʻi Haʻatakalaua. Their children, therefore, would combine the blood of the three grand royal dynasties in Tonga. At the age of 18, she became a mother for the first time. Her children were:

- King Tāufaʻāhau Tupou IV, born Crown Prince Siaosi Tāufaʻāhau Tupoulahi (4 July 1918 – 10 September 2006);
- Prince Uiliami Tukuʻaho (5 November 1919 – 28 April 1936), who died young;
- Prince Sione Ngū Manumataongo, later the 5th Tuʻipelehake (Fatafehi) (7 January 1922 – 10 April 1999).

Three pregnancies ended in miscarriages (1920, 1923, and 1924).

== Reign ==
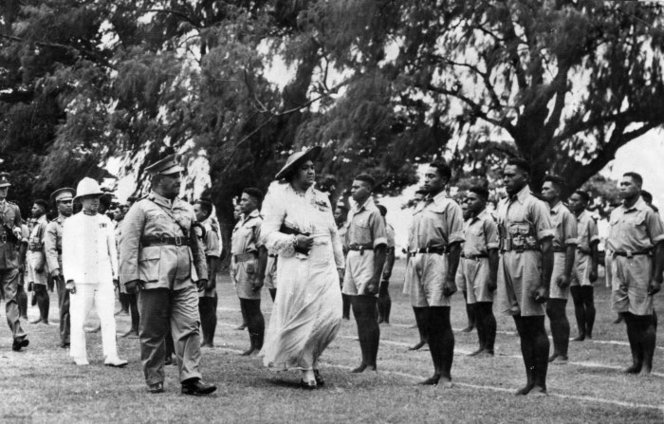
Queen Sālote inspects her troops following Tonga's declaration of war on Nazi Germany in 1940.

Sālote was proclaimed Queen on 6 April 1918, following her father's death from tuberculosis the previous day.

In 1920–1921, she assisted the Bernice P. Bishop Museum's Bayard Dominick Expedition with their mapping of Tongan archaeological sites by providing access to localities and information. The expedition's reports on the Tongan past—including a large volume of material which still remains unpublished even today—were primarily compiled by Edward Winslow Gifford and provided the groundwork for comprehensive studies of the pre-contact history of the Tongans (Burley 1998). She was also a keen writer and author of dance songs and love poems, published in 2004, edited by her biographer, Elizabeth Wood-Ellem.

Sālote led Tonga through World War II, with the islands declaring war on Nazi Germany in 1940 and on the Empire of Japan in 1941 following its attack on Pearl Harbor. She put Tonga's resources at the disposal of Britain and supported the Allied cause throughout the war. Tongan troops saw battle against the Japanese in the Solomon Islands campaign, including on Guadalcanal.

A key advisor of hers from 1924 to 1946, was Australian missionary Rodger Page, who played a key role in the reunification of the Free Wesleyan Church of Tonga, of which she was a member. Owing to his influence on Sālote, Page was described as a sort of power behind the throne by historian Sione Lātūkefu.

She brought Tonga to international attention when, during her sole visit to Europe, she attended the 1953 coronation of Elizabeth II in London. During the coronation procession, it began to rain and hoods were placed on the carriages in the procession. As Tongan etiquette dictates that one should not imitate the actions of persons one is honouring, she refused a hood and rode through the pouring rain in an open carriage with Sultan Ibrahim of Kelantan, endearing herself to spectators. She served as Chairman of the Tonga Traditions Committee from 1954 and patronised the Tonga Red Cross Society.

Many Tongans respected and approved of Sālote, seeing her as "tough, hard-working, just, ambitious". She was also described as very approachable, with her palace doors being open to all. This led to her being very knowledgeable not just of Tongan tradition (in which she was already well-versed prior to her marriage), but also of specific family histories, which are very important in Tongan culture. She would often assist and impress visiting anthropologists with her detailed knowledge of the culture.

== Illness and death ==
Sālote had a somewhat troubled medical history. She suffered from diabetes, requiring frequent visits to Auckland for treatment. An operation had to be conducted in 1935 to treat her cancer. During tests in Auckland in 1965 a second bout of cancer was found. Despite this, the Queen returned to Tonga in May and even participated in a festival in July 1965 celebrating her record reign. Ten thousand children were allowed to enter the palace grounds and wave at the Queen as she sat on the verandah. This would be the last time the Tongan people saw their Queen.

Queen Sālote died in hospital in Auckland on 16 December 1965 at 12:15 am. Her body was flown back to Tonga by the Royal New Zealand Air Force. The funeral service took place on 23 December with fifty thousand people in attendance. Her body was placed next to her husband and her tomb was guarded for several nights, as per tradition.

== Depictions in popular culture ==
Trinidadian-Venezuelan musician Edmundo Ros composed, recorded, and performed a calypso song titled "The Queen of Tonga" whose lyrics refer to Queen Sālote attending the coronation of Elizabeth II.

== Family tree ==
Tupou family tree

Tuʻi Haʻatakalaua line | Tuʻi Tonga line | Tuʻi Kanokupolu line
Kalolaine Fusimatalili | George Tupou I | Fīnau Kaunanga
Fifita Vavʻau | Tēvita ʻUnga | Sālote Mafile‘o Pilolevu | Filiaipulotu
Fusipala Taukiʻonetuku | Fatafehi Toutaitokotaha
Lavinia Veiongo | George Tupou II | ʻAnaseini Takipō
Viliami Tungī Mailefihi | Sālote Tupou III | Vīlai Tupou (illegitimate son) | Tupou Seini
Tāufaʻāhau Tupou IV | Halaevalu Mataʻaho ʻAhomeʻe | Siaosi 'Alipate Tupou, Baron Vaea | Tuputupu Ma'afu-'o-Tukuialahi
George Tupou V | Tupou VI | Nanasipauʻu Tukuʻaho
ʻIlima Lei Fifita Tohi (illegitimate daughter) | Tupoutoʻa ʻUlukalala | Sinaitakala Fakafanua
Taufaʻahau Manumataongo

- Fox, James J.; Sather, Clifford (1996). Origins, Ancestry and Alliance: Explorations in Austronesian Ethnography. Canberra: Department of Anthropology, Australian National University. p. 252. ISBN 978-0-7315-2432-7. OCLC 245762652.
- Kaeppler, Adrienne Lois; D.C. (2008). The Pacific Arts of Polynesia and Micronesia. Oxford: Oxford University Press. p. 90. ISBN 978-0-19-284238-1. OCLC 236158882.
- Völkel, Svenja (2010). Social Structure, Space and Possession in Tongan Culture and Language: An Ethnolinguistic Study. Amsterdam; Philadelphia: John Benjamins Publishing. p. 45. ISBN 978-90-272-0283-3.
- Wood-Ellem, Elizabeth (1999). Queen Sālote of Tonga: The Story of an Era 1900-1965. Auckland, N.Z: Auckland University Press. p. front. ISBN 978-0-8248-2529-4. OCLC 262293605.

== Honours ==
- United Kingdom: Honorary Dame Grand Cross of the Order of St Michael and St George
- United Kingdom: Honorary Dame Grand Cross of the Royal Victorian Order
- United Kingdom: Honorary Dame Grand Cross of the Order of the British Empire
- United Kingdom: Honorary Dame Grand Cross of the Order of St John
- United Kingdom: Recipient of the King George V Silver Jubilee Medal
- United Kingdom: Recipient of the King George VI Coronation Medal
- United Kingdom: Recipient of the Queen Elizabeth II Coronation Medal

Regnal titles
| Preceded by George Tupou II | Queen of Tonga; 1918–1965 | Succeeded by Tāufaʻāhau Tupou IV |
