= Malaʻekula =

Tongan royal burial grounds

Coordinates: 21°08′10″S 175°12′14″W

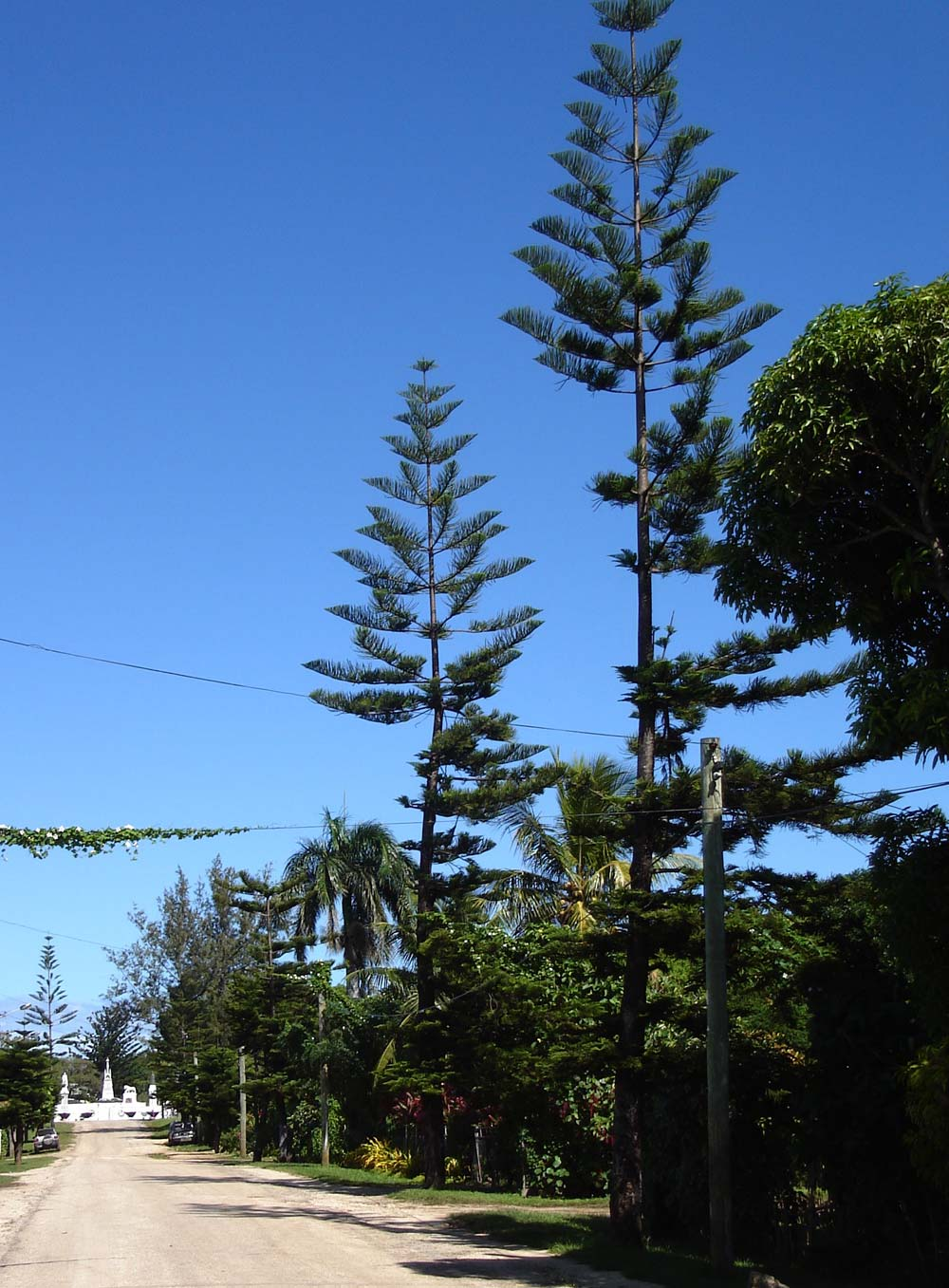
The Kings Road towards Malaʻekula, with the tomb of Siaosi Tupou I in the background

Malaʻekula (lit. 'Red square'), alternatively spelled Malaʻe Kula, is the royal burial grounds located in central Nukuʻalofa, Tonga, reserved solely for Tongan monarchs, their spouses and their children. Extended family members (such as cousins, nephews, nieces and in-laws) are buried in alternate chiefly cemeteries. Royal family members of previous generations (i.e. the Tuʻi Tonga line) were largely interred in the langi in Muʻa.

Malaʻekula is a short distance south of the royal palace along the Hala Tuʻi, known officially in English as the "Kings Road". It is named as such for being the final road every Tongan monarch travels before reaching their final resting place in Malaʻekula. The Hala Tuʻ is also known as the Hala Paini ("pine road") for the Norfolk pines (considered royal trees in Tonga) that once lined its flanks; after being planted initially by early Europeans, the trees have all since died due to the underlying seawater beneath the earth. Malaʻekula was built following the death of the first king of modern Tonga, George Tupou I. His tomb is located in the very middle of the cemetery, visible from the palace grounds when peering down the Hala Tuʻi.

Malaʻe in Tongan is the royal word for cemetery; kula meaning red. It is named in remembrance of the historic kātoanga kula ("red festival") held on the grounds in 1885. The festival was a fundraising event for the recently opened Tonga College whose corporate colour is vermilion red, the color every festival attendee wore that day.
