= Tavake Barron Afeaki =

Tongan lawyer

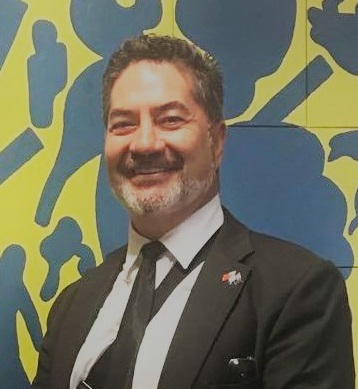
Tuinukutavake Barron Afeaki in 2020

Tu’inukutavake Barron Afeaki is a Tongan New Zealander lawyer. He has served as Lord Chancellor of Tonga since 2020.

Afeaki was born in New Zealand. He is a past president of the Māori Law Society. In 2002 he was appointed to the New Zealand Legal Aid Review Panel. In July 2010 he was appointed to the New Zealand State Housing Appeal Authority.

In Tonga, he represented Ramsay Dalgety in his perjury trial following the MV Princess Ashika disaster. In June 2017 he was appointed to the Judicial Committee of the Privy Council of Tonga as a Law Lord. In February 2020 he was appointed Lord Chancellor, replacing Harry Waalkens. In October 2021 he was appointed Chief Justice of Tonga for four months while Michael Hargreaves Whitten was on holiday, despite not being a qualified judge. The appointment was controversial as Afeaki was the chair of the panel which recommended his own appointment, and the normal process would have seen the next most senior Supreme Court Judge - Laki Niu, a commoner - act in the role. As a result, a group of Tongan lawyers wrote to the king requesting that the appointment be revoked. The request was rejected. While acting chief justice, he made unexplained changes to a prisoner's sentence.
