= Petunia (disambiguation) =

Petunia is a genus of flowering plants.

Petunia may also refer to:

== Arts and entertainment ==
- Petunia (film), a 2012 American independent film
- "Petunia, the Gardener's Daughter", a song performed by Elvis Presley
- Petunia Pig, a cartoon character
- Aunt Petunia (disambiguation), several fictional characters, including Harry Potter's aunt
- Joe and Petunia, characters from a series of public information films
- Ms. Petunia, a ghost in the Nintendo game Luigi's Mansion
- A character from Happy Tree Friends

== Other ==
- Petunia (color), a shade of violet
- Petunia (given name)
- Petunia, Virginia
- Petunia Peak, a mountain in Washington state
- 968 Petunia, a minor planet
