= Taniela Tufui =

Tongan lawyer and civil servant

Taniela "Dan" Hoko’ila Tufui, styled Lord Tufui of Talaheu (died 19 April 2016) was a Tongan lawyer and civil servant. He was the first Tongan to serve as Solicitor-General of Tonga, and was later appointed to the Privy Council of Tonga.

Tufui was educated at Marist College Ashgrove in Brisbane, Australia before studying law at the University of Queensland. He returned to Tonga in 1964, and was appointed Solicitor-General the following year - the first Tongan to hold the role. In 1971, he was part of the Tongan delegation to the first meeting of the South Pacific Forum, and to the South Pacific Commission Conference. He served as Solicitor-General until 1972, and was then appointed Secretary to the Government and Cabinet Secretary. In this role, he was Tonga's delegate to the Pacific maritime conference at Waitangi, Northland, where he opposed the New Zealand Seafarers' Union demand that shipping to the Pacific be staffed by New Zealand crews. He later led trade delegations to New Zealand, and served as chair of the board of Pacific Forum Line.

After retiring from the civil service in 2001 he was appointed to the Higher Salaries Review Committee, and then in 2004 to the National Committee for Political Reform. In October 2006 he served briefly as Chief Justice of Tonga while Anthony Ford was in New Zealand. In July 2008 he was appointed to the Judicial Committee of the Privy Council of Tonga as a law lord, becoming Lord Tufui of Talaheu.

He died in Ballarat, Australia on 19 April 2016.

== Honours ==
National honours

- Order of Queen Sālote Tupou III, Grand Cross (31 July 2008).
