= Petunia Tupou =

Tongan Supreme Court judge

Petunia Tupou is a judge of the Supreme Court of Tonga since 2022.

== Career ==
Tupou was educated at the University of Waikato in New Zealand, graduating in 1996 with a BA and LLB. She was admitted to the bar in New Zealand in 1996, and in Tonga in 1997. In September 2015 she was appointed honorary consul for the Netherlands. In April 2021 she was appointed to the board of the Tonga Tourism Authority.

In September 2020 she was made a King's Counsel. In July 2022 she was appointed as a judge of the Supreme Court of Tonga, replacing Laki Niu. She was the second woman appointed as a judge, after 'Elisapeti Langi. She was sworn in on 1 August 2022.

In September 2023 she was appointed acting Chief Justice, following the retirement of Michael Whitten. She served in that role until the appointment of Malcolm Bishop in August 2024.

== Honours ==
National honours

- Order of the Crown of Tonga, Member (6 July 2021).
