= Linda Folaumoetuʻi =

Tongan lawyer and civil servant

Attorney General of Tonga
- Incumbent
- Assumed office 21 March 2019
- Prime Minister: ʻAkilisi Pōhiva; Pōhiva Tuʻiʻonetoa; Siaosi Sovaleni
- Preceded by: ʻAminiasi Kefu

Personal details
- Education: University of Auckland, University of the South Pacific, University of Melbourne

Linda Simiki Folaumoetu'i is a Tongan lawyer and civil servant. Since 2019 she has served as Attorney General of Tonga, and is the first woman to ever serve in that role.

Folaumoetu'i was educated at the University of Auckland, University of the South Pacific, and University of Melbourne. She worked as a legal officer for Tonga's Crown Law Department from 1993. In December 2006 she was appointed Solicitor General of Tonga. As Solicitor-General, she was responsible for the unsuccessful prosecution of pro-democracy members of Parliament over the 2006 Nukuʻalofa riots.

From 2008 to 2014 she worked as a litigation advisor to the Regional Assistance Mission to Solomon Islands. After returning to Tonga in 2015 she was appointed chief executive of the Office of the Commissioner for Public Relations. In 2016 she was appointed to Tonga's Electoral Commission. In June 2017 she was appointed to the Judicial Committee of the Privy Council of Tonga as a Law Lord.

In March 2019 she was appointed Attorney-General, the first woman to hold the position. As Attorney-General she considered laying treason charges against people criticising Tonga's royal family on Facebook, and met with Facebook over a proposal to ban the service from Tonga.
