= 2012 ʻEua Noble by-election =

- 2 August 2012
Candidate	Lord Nuku	Lord Vahaʻi
Popular vote	8	2
Percentage	66.7%	16.7%

A by-election was held for the ʻEua Noble seat to the Legislative Assembly of Tonga on 2 August 2012. It was triggered by the dismissal from Parliament of the incumbent, the Speaker Lord Lasike, following his conviction for illegal possession of ammunition in July.

The Tongan nobility elect nine representatives to Parliament. Technically, ʻEua is not a distinct constituency. Seventeen nobles jointly elect the three representatives of Tongatapu and the single representative of ʻEua, from within the same pool of nobles.

== Candidates and voters ==
Nobles do not officially stand as candidates, and none belong to any political party. Of the seventeen nobles attached to the joint Tongatapu / ʻEua constituency, three (Lord Ramsay Robertson Dalgety, Lord Tevita Poasi Tupou and Lord Feleti Sevele) are life peers, were entitled to vote but not to be elected. There were fourteen titles of hereditary nobility attached to the constituency, entitling their bearers to vote and be elected. However, Lord Lasike was barred from the election, while the Lavaka title was at that time held by King Tupou VI. In addition, three nobles (Prime Minister Lord Tuʻivakano, Lord Maʻafu, and Lord Vaea) were already members of the Assembly.

== Result ==
Twelve votes were cast. Lord Nuku (former Minister for Police, Prisons and Fire Services under Prime Minister Prince Lavaka Ata from 2005 to 2006, then Minister for Works under Prime Minister Feleti Sevele from 2006 to 2010) was elected with eight votes, regaining a seat he had lost in the 2010 general election. Lord Vahaʻi received two votes. Prince Ata, the King's younger son, received one vote, as did Lord Veʻehala.

2012 ʻEua Noble by-election
Party	Candidate	Votes	%	±%
Independent	Lord Nuku	8	66.67%	
Independent	Lord Vahaʻi	2	16.67%	
Independent	Prince Ata	1	8.33%	
Independent	Lord Veʻehala	1	8.33%	
Turnout		12	75%	
Majority		6	50%	
Lord Nuku gain from Havea Hikule‘o ‘oPulotu				

== Aftermath ==
In October, Lord Lasike was acquitted on appeal; the Court of Appeal ruled that the Crown prosecution had not proved that Lasike had been aware that the incriminating ammunition was in his possession. Lasike immediately announced that he would challenge his dismissal from Parliament.
