= Havea Hikuleʻo ʻoPulotu =

Speaker of the Tongan Legislative Assembly (died 2025)

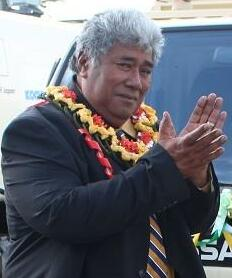
Lasike in 2021

Havea Hikuleʻo ʻoPulotu, Lord Lasike, (1957 or 1958 — 28 May 2025) was a former Speaker of the Tongan Legislative Assembly.

== Political career ==
Lasike was first elected to the Tongan Legislative Assembly, as a representative of the nobility, in a by-election in 2005, following Lord Nuku's appointment to Cabinet. He was re-elected in the 2008 elections and again in 2010. In March 2006, he was charged with rape and indecent assault, after an incident involving an employee of a hotel he part-owned, but was acquitted.

On 21 December 2010, Lasike was elected Speaker of the House.

== Conviction and removal ==
On 19 April 2011 Lasike was charged with unlawful possession of ammunition following a search of his hotel room in Nuku'alofa. Other firearms charges were dismissed. On 14 October he failed to appear in court, and a warrant was issued for his arrest, but later cancelled after he appealed.

In December, Chief Justice Michael Scott issued a new warrant for his arrest, finding that he had breached the conditions of his bail. He had been granted permission to travel to Israel as part of a parliamentary delegation, but had instead flown to the United States, where he had reportedly got married. Prime Minister Lord Tuʻivakano called upon Lord Lasike to resign as Speaker. In mid-January, Lasike returned to Tonga, and was immediately arrested and taken to court, where his passport was taken from him. He was also criticised for having "abandoned" the delegation he was supposed to have led in Israel, thus jeopardising a mission said to be important for Tonga's diplomatic and economic relations with the country. Having pleaded not guilty to the count of illegal possession of two .22 ammunitions, he was tried in early July. His counsel was Clive Edwards.

On 9 July 2012, Lasike was convicted of illegally possessing ammunition and fined US$280. As a result, he automatically forfeited his seat in Parliament. Lord Nuku was elected to the vacant seat in a by-election. In October, Lasike was acquitted on appeal; the Court of Appeal ruled that the Crown prosecution had not proved that Lasike had been aware that the incriminating ammunition was in his possession. Lasike immediately announced that he would challenge his dismissal from Parliament.
