= 1930 Tongan general election =

General elections were held in Tonga in 1930.

== Electoral system ==
The Legislative Assembly consisted of seven members elected by commoners, seven elected by the nobility and nine members of the Privy Council (four ministers, four governors and the Chief Justice). The country was divided into three constituencies, with three commoners and nobles elected in Tongatapu and the surrounding islets, and two of each from both Haʻapai and Vavaʻu.

Voting was restricted to men aged 21 or over.

== Aftermath ==
The newly elected Parliament was opened by Queen Sālote Tupou III on 20 August 1930.
