= Siaosi Taimani ʻAho =

Tongan diplomat

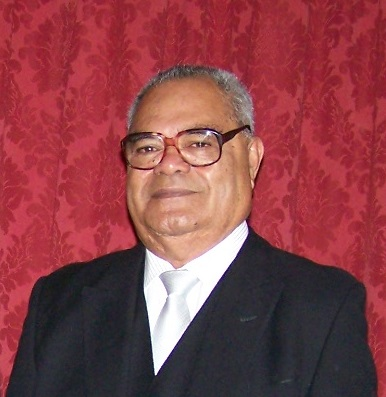
- ʻAho in 2009

Minister of Police, Prisons and Fire Services
- In office 17 May 2006 – 2009
- Prime Minister: Feleti Sevele
- Preceded by: Sitenimoa Valevale

Attorney General of Tonga
- In office 24 September 2004 – 17 May 2006
- Prime Minister: Feleti Sevele 'Ulukalala Lavaka Ata
- Preceded by: Baron Fielakepa
- Succeeded by: ʻAlisi Afeaki Taumoepeau

Commissioner for Public Relations
- In office 2001–2004
- Prime Minister: 'Ulukalala Lavaka Ata
- Preceded by: none (office established)
- Succeeded by: Penisimani Fonua

Personal details
- Died: 27 April 2018

Siaosi Taimani ʻAho (died 27 April 2018) was a Tongan diplomat, civil servant, politician, and Cabinet minister. He was Tonga's first Commissioner for Public Relations.

In 1982 he was appointed Secretary to the Cabinet. He was later made secretary for Foreign Affairs. In July 1987 he was appointed Tonga's ambassador to the United States of America.

In 2001, he was appointed as Tonga's first Commissioner for Public Relations, with the task of investigating complaints about maladministration in government departments. In 2004 he asked for the Commissioner's office to have more powers to compel government agencies to release information.

In 2004 he was appointed Attorney General of Tonga and Minister of Justice, replacing Baron Fielakepa who had been in the post for only a month. During the 2005 Tongan public service strike he accused the Tongan Public Service Association of holding the country hostage. A cabinet reshuffle in 2006 saw him surrender his portfolios and become Minister of Police, Prisons and Fire Services instead. He was police minister during the 2006 Nukuʻalofa riots, and was responsible for the prolonged state of emergency which followed. Following reports that many of those detained after the riots had been abused by police and soldiers, he called the reports "one-sided".

In March 2009 he was appointed as Tonga's first High Commissioner to New Zealand. The High Commission was closed in 2011 for financial reasons.

ʻAho died on 27 April 2018 following an undisclosed illness.

== Honours ==
National honours

- Order of Queen Sālote Tupou III, Knight Grand Cross (31 July 2008).
