= Harry Waalkens =

New Zealand lawyer

Harry Waalkens KC (born 1955) is a New Zealand lawyer. He was Lord Chancellor of Tonga from 2011 to 2020.

Waalkens was born in Whangārei and educated at Taipuha Primary School and Otamatea High School before attending boarding school in Auckland. He graduated from the University of Auckland in 1980 with a joint degree in commerce and law, and then worked as a crown prosecutor in Tonga from 1981 to 1982. He was a partner in Bell Gully Buddle Weir before entering independent practice in 1994. In 2004 he was appointed Queen's Counsel in New Zealand. in 2009 he was appointed King's Counsel in Tonga.

In 2011 he was appointed to the Privy Council of Tonga as Lord Chancellor. His appointment was initially welcomed by Tonga's democratic movement, In 2020 he was replaced as Lord Chancellor by Tavake Barron Afeaki.

== Honours ==
National honours

- Order of the Crown of Tonga, Commander (31 July 2008).
