= Adsett =

Adsett is a surname. Notable people with the surname include:

- Neil Adsett (fl. 2008–2014), Australian lawyer working in the Pacific Islands
- Sandy Adsett (born 1939), New Zealand artist

• Ryan Adsett (born 2001), English entrepreneur and journalist
