= 1990 Tongan general election =

General elections were held in Tonga on 14 and 15 February 1990 to elect members of the Legislative Assembly of Tonga. Nine nobles and nine people's representatives were elected. Seven of the latter favoured democratic reform. Voter turnout was 65.4%.

== Background ==
The 1987 Tongan general election saw the election of Laki Niu and ʻAkilisi Pōhiva and an increased focus on accountability for the government, particularly in the areas of parliamentary allowances, passport sales, and financial management. After a series of evasive Ministerial answers and Ministers using international travel to avoid being questioned entirely, in September 1989 all the elected People's Representatives walked out, returning only when they would have forfeited their seats. On their return, they introduced motions calling for a reduction in the number of Noble Representatives and an increase in the number of People's Representatives. The first was voted down, and the second subsequently withdrawn.

== Campaign ==
Parliament was closed on 29 October 1989. During December and January conservatives led by Lord Fusituʻa attempted to enlist the church to back a "church and state" campaign and formed a de facto political party. In January 1990 King Tāufaʻāhau Tupou IV intervened in the election, giving an interview to Matangi Tonga in which he complained about the walkout and said that change could become uncontrollable and result in a Coup d'état. The Times of Tonga reported that claims that reformers were communists attempting to overthrow the government was a campaign of fear. Two days before the election an attempt was made to nullify the candidacies of two reformist candidates on the grounds of debt; the debts were immediately paid and they remained on the ballot.

== Results ==
Party	Votes	%	Seats	+/–
Pro-reform candidates	35,116	57.34	7	+2
Anti-reform candidates	26,127	42.66	2	–2
Nobles' representatives			9	0
Total	61,243	100.00	18	0
Valid votes	26,227	95.79		
Invalid/blank votes	1,154	4.21		
Total votes	27,381	100.00		
Registered voters/turnout	41,880	65.38		
Source: Nohlen et al.

=== People's seats ===
Constituency	Elected	Party	Votes
Tongatapu (3 representatives)	ʻAkilisi Pōhiva	Independent	9,441
Tongatapu (3 representatives)	Laki Niu	Independent	9,402
Tongatapu (3 representatives)	Viliami Fukofuka	Independent	7,259
ʻEua (1 representative)	Moeakiola Takai	Independent	939
Haʻapai (2 representatives)	Sione Teisina Fuko	Independent	2,657
Haʻapai (2 representatives)	Viliami Pousima Afeaki	Independent	2,249
Vavaʻu (2 representatives)	'Atunaisa Katoa	Independent	2,100
Vavaʻu (2 representatives)	Siale Faletau	Independent	1,793
Niuas (1 representative)	Siaki Tu'ipulotu Kata	Independent	425
Source: Hills
