= Marist College Ashgrove =

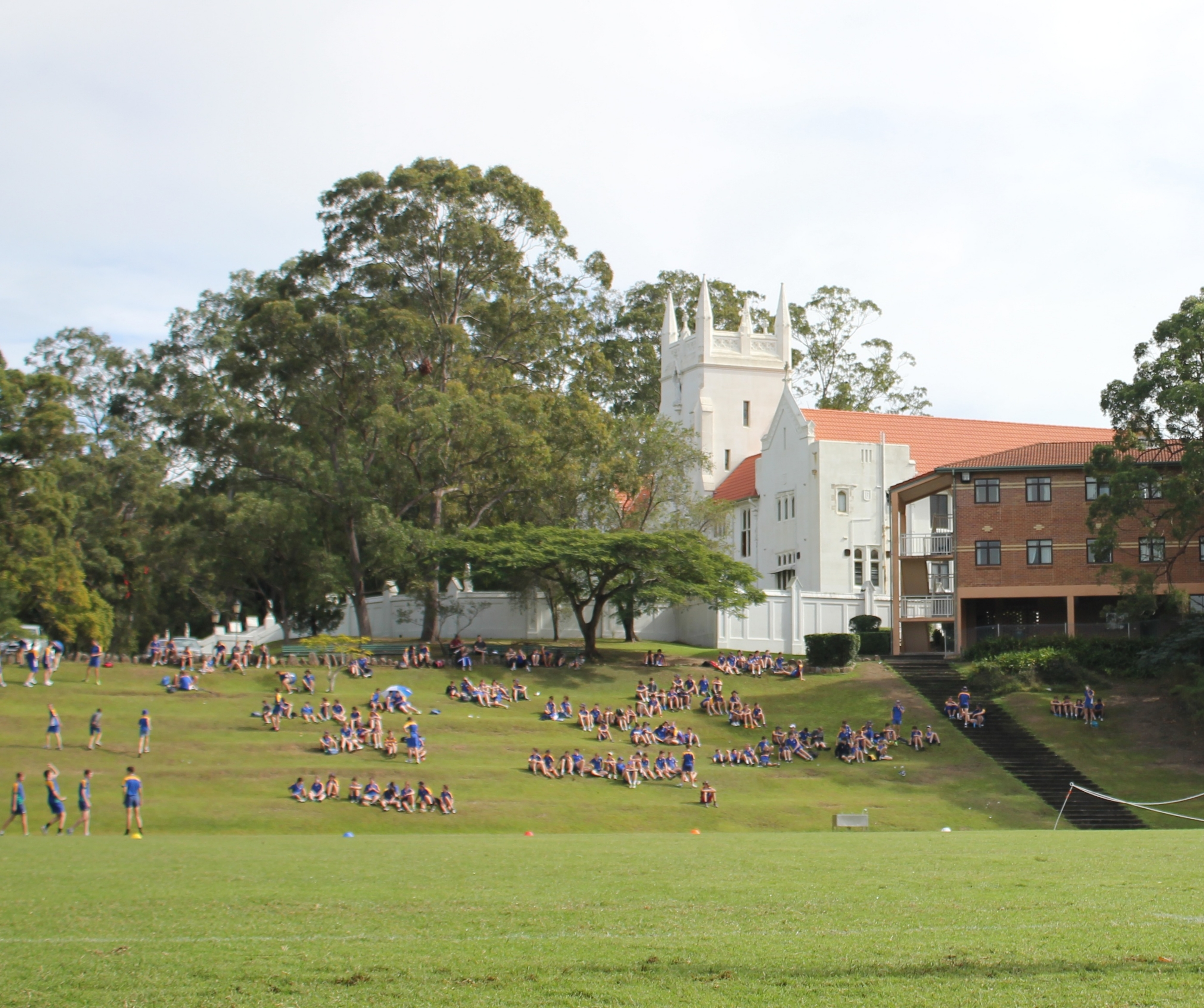
- Marist College Ashgrove tower, built in 1931

Location
- Ashgrove, Brisbane, Queensland; Australia; 27°26′25″S 152°58′41″E

Information
- Type: Independent day and boarding primary and secondary school
- Motto: Latin: Viriliter Age (Act Courageously)
- Religious affiliation: Marist Brothers
- Denomination: Roman Catholic
- Established: 1940; 86 years ago
- Sister school: All Hallows’ School & Mt. St. Michael’s College
- Headmaster: Michael Newman
- Chaplain: Fr Alatini Kolofo'ou
- Staff: ~137
- Years: 5–12
- Gender: Boys
- Enrolment: c. 1,700
- Area: 26 hectares (64 acres)
- Campus type: Suburban
- Colours: Royal blue and gold
- Affiliation: Associated Independent Colleges
- Website: www.marash.qld.edu.au

Marist College Ashgrove is an independent Roman Catholic day and boarding primary and secondary school for boys, located in the northern Brisbane suburb of Ashgrove, in Queensland, Australia. The college caters for students from Year 5 to Year 12.

== History ==
Marist College Ashgrove was founded by the Marist Brothers as a day and boarding College for boys on 17 March 1940. Enrolment preferences are given to baptised Catholics, with participation in the Church given more consideration.

The College educates 1700 students from Years 5 to 12, 170 of whom are boarders, and provides wide-ranging programs encompassing academics, the visual and performing arts, sports and service projects.

The ethos and mission of the College are influenced by the founder of the Marist Brothers, Saint Marcellin Champagnat.

== Campus ==
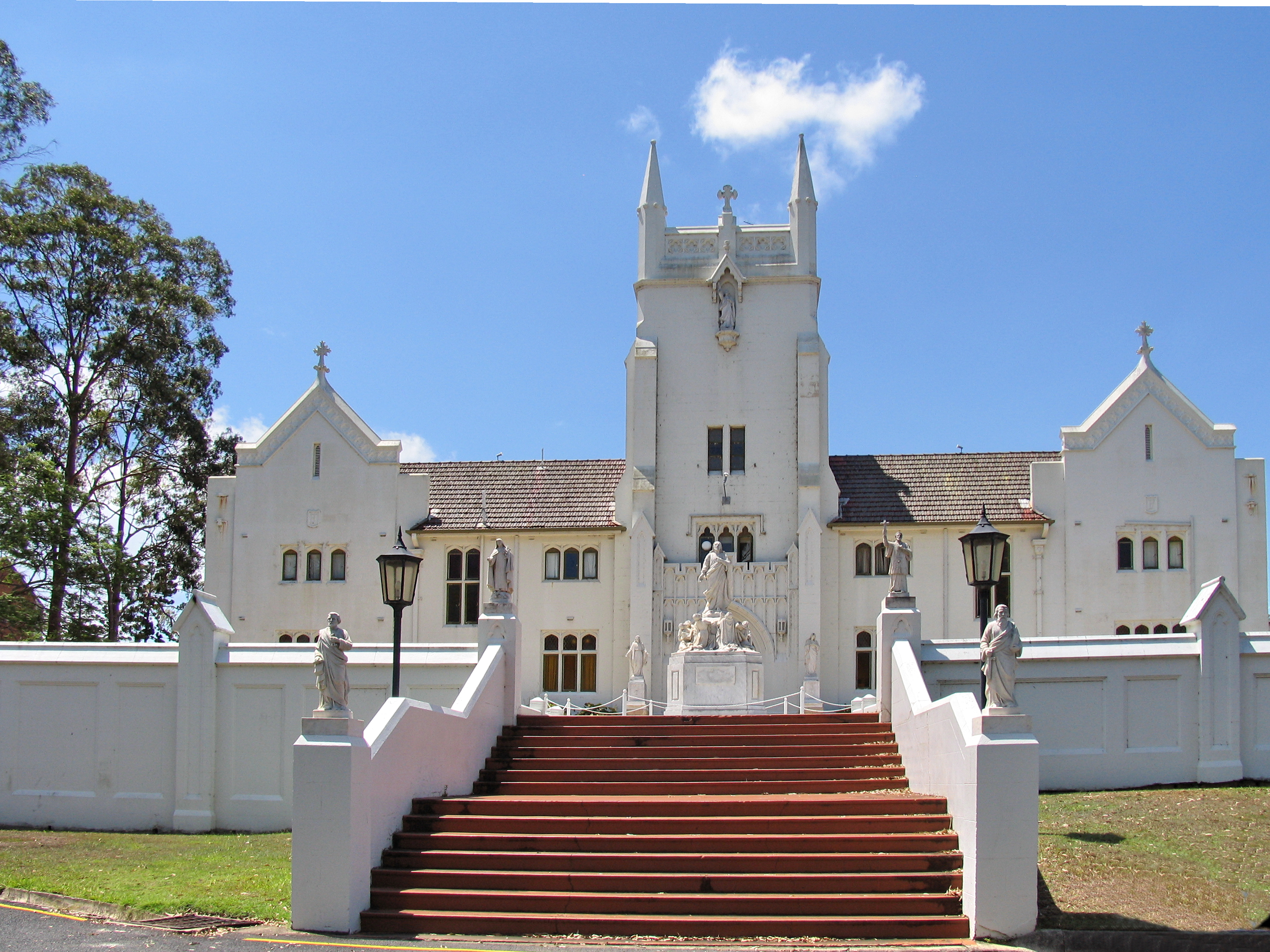
View of the tower building front entrance

The college is situated on a 26-hectare (260,000 m^{2}) campus and includes such facilities as:

- McMahon Oval – used for both Rugby Union and cricket – featuring the John Eales Grandstand and Matthew Hayden scoreboard
- Science Block
- 8 cricket / rugby union / soccer ovals containing:
- 2 multi-purpose courts basketball/tennis
- 6 floodlit hard tennis courts
- Long jump/triple jump training track
- Shot put/discus/javelin stations
- Gymnasium – capacity for 2 indoor basketball courts/8 badminton courts
- 2 outdoor basketball courts
- Weight room
- Matthew Hayden cricket training complex
- Olympic sized heated swimming pool with grandstand
- A performing and visual arts centre which houses a 340-seat theatre
- Three distinct houses that contain the five boarding residences
- Hall of Fame

== Boarding school ==
Marist College Ashgrove offers a boarding school for students from Years 6 to 12 and can cater for up to 220 boarders. The boarding community includes many students from the Greater Brisbane Region and South East Queensland, along with many country students from Outback Queensland and regional Australia. International students also board from the Asia-Pacific region from countries and territories such as Papua New Guinea, the Solomon Islands and Hong Kong. The school has eight houses:

- Ephrem
- Foley
- Gilroy
- Harold
- Ignatius
- Rush
- Ridley
- Slattery

== Sport ==
Marist College Ashgrove is a member of the Associated Independent Colleges (AIC).

=== AIC premierships ===
Marist College Ashgrove has won the following AIC premierships.

- Athletics (12) – 1999, 2003, 2004, 2005, 2015, 2016, 2017, 2018, 2019, 2020, 2021, 2022, 2023
- Basketball (10) – 1999, 2000, 2002, 2003, 2004, 2005, 2006, 2016, 2017, 2018
- Cricket (10) – 2003, 2005, 2009, 2010, 2011, 2012, 2014, 2015, 2018, 2023
- Cross Country (13) – 2002, 2005, 2008, 2009, 2010, 2012, 2014, 2017, 2018, 2019, 2020, 2021, 2022
- Rugby (14) – 1999, 2001, 2002, 2003, 2004, 2005, 2006, 2007, 2009, 2011, 2017, 2018, 2019, 2020, 2026
- Soccer (10) – 2000, 2003, 2004, 2008, 2009, 2010, 2011, 2019, 2020, 2021
- Swimming (13) – 2001, 2002, 2003, 2005, 2006, 2007, 2008, 2009, 2010, 2011, 2013, 2015, 2016
- Tennis (7) – 2001, 2003, 2007, 2008, 2009, 2010, 2011
- Volleyball (6) – 2004, 2007, 2009, 2010, 2017, 2021
- Australian Football (2) – 2023, 2024
- Esports (1) – 2022

== Crest and motto ==
The crest of the college is based on the design of the crest of St Joseph's College, Hunters Hill in Sydney. The four quadrants of the shield are filled with: the Marist Monogram with its twelve stars in the top left; the Southern Cross in the top right; the MCA logo in the bottom left; and the lamp and book representing learning in the bottom right.

The college's motto is "Viriliter Age", which translates from Latin to "Act Courageously". The motto was adopted in 1957 and is displayed above the crest.

== Notable alumni ==
=== Arts ===
- Michael Bauer – novelist
- Joe Brumm – animator, creator of Bluey
- Andrew McGahan – novelist
- Humphrey McQueen – historian and author
- Ray Meagher – actor

=== Business ===
- Robert Deakin – social entrepreneur and cyber security expert
- Bill Ludwig – trade union leader

=== Medicine ===
- Michael Gabbett – clinical geneticist, paediatrician and academic

=== Music ===
- Joel Adams – pop singer-songwriter

=== Law ===
- David Jackson – Australian Federal Court judge
- Nathan Jarro – Queensland District Court judge
- Martin Moynihan AO – former Queensland Supreme Court judge and Chair of the Queensland Crime and Corruption Commission

=== Politics ===
- Sir Julius Chan – former Prime Minister of Papua New Guinea
- Kevin Rudd – former Prime Minister of Australia
- Taniela (Dan) Tufui – former Chief Secretary to the Government of Tonga and Secretary to Cabinet
- Peter Lawlor – former Labor Member for Southport

=== Religion ===
- James Foley – former Catholic Bishop of Cairns
- Brian Heenan – former Catholic Bishop of Rockhampton

=== Sport ===
==== Australian Rules Football ====
- Charlie Cameron – AFL player with the Brisbane Lions
- Lachlan Keeffe – AFL player with Greater Western Sydney

==== Boxing ====
- Paul Miller – boxer and Olympian

==== Cricket ====
- Alex Cusack – Irish national cricket player
- Matthew Hayden – Australian and Queensland cricketer
- Peter McPhee – cricket player
- Dylan McLachlan – Queensland cricketer÷

==== Rugby League ====
- Billy Walters – rugby league player

==== Rugby Union ====
- John Connolly – former Wallabies coach
- Des Connor – former dual international rugby union player for Australia and New Zealand
- John Eales – rugby union player and former captain of the Australian Wallabies
- Nick Frisby – rugby union player – scrumhalf – Queensland Reds
- Richard Graham – Queensland Reds coach and Western Force coach
- Bryce Hegarty – rugby union player – flyhalf – NSW Waratahs
- Anthony Herbert – former rugby union player
- Daniel Herbert – former rugby union player
- Pat Howard – Australian rugby union coach,
- Robert (Bob) Honan – former Australian national rugby union and rugby league player
- Brendan McKibbin – rugby union player – scrum half – NSW Waratahs
- Brendan Moon – former rugby union player for the Queensland Reds
- Alex Rokobaro – rugby union player – Stade Francais, Melbourne Rebels
- Alex Toolis – rugby union player – lock – Edinburgh Rugby, Melbourne Rebels
- Ben Toolis – rugby union player – lock – Edinburgh Rugby
- Emosi Tuqiri – rugby union player – Fijian Drua
- Floyd Aubrey – Rugby Union player – Queensland Reds – GPS Rugby

==== Soccer ====
- Corey Brown – football player
- Ben Griffin – football player

==== Speed skating ====
- Stephen Lee – speed skater and Olympian

==== Swimming ====
- Michael Bohl – former Commonwealth Games swimmer and Australian Olympic coach

==== Triathlon ====
- Ryan Fisher – triathlete and Olympian

==== Volleyball ====
- Andrew Grant – volleyball player and Olympian

==== Water Polo ====
- Pietro Figlioli – Olympian – Water Polo

==== Weightlifting ====
- Lev Susany – powerlifter and Commonwealth record holder

==== Windsurfing ====
- Sean O'Brien – windsurfer and Olympic Sailing team coach

== See also ==
- List of schools in Queensland
- List of boarding schools in Australia
- List of Marist Brothers schools
