= William Horne =

William, Willie, Bill, or Billy Horne may refer to:

== Politics ==
- William Horne (British politician) (1774–1860) British member of parliament and Attorney General for England and Wales
- Bill Horne (born 1948), Canadian politician
- William C. Horne (b. 1962), Nevada state representative
- William S. Horne (1936–2022), Maryland politician and judge

== Sports ==
- William Horne (golfer) (born 1880), English golfer
- William Horne (footballer) (1885–1930), English football player
- Billy Horne (1916–1969), American baseball player
- Willie Horne (1922–2001), English rugby league player

== Others ==
- Brother William Horne (d. 1540), one of the "Carthusian Martyrs"
- William Kenneth Horne (1883–1959), British colonial judge and speaker
- William Horne (tenor) (1913–1983), operatic tenor, notably with the New York City Opera

== See also ==
- William Horn (1841–1922), Australian mining magnate, pastoralist, politician, author, sculptor and philanthropist
- Will Horn, American baseball player of the 1900s
- Bill Horn (born 1967), Canadian ice hockey player and coach
- Billy Horn (born 1938), Scottish footballer
- Sir William Whorne, Lord Mayor of London in 1487
