= Tufui =

Tufui is a surname. Notable people with the surname include:

- Nafe Tufui (born 1968), Tongan rugby union player
- Taniela Tufui (died 2016), Tongan lawyer
