= Baron Fielakepa =

Tongan public servant and government minister

Sosaia Tupou Aleamotuʻa

Minister for Lands, Survey and Natural Resources
- In office 2001–2006

Attorney General of Tonga
- In office 24 August 2004 – 2004
- Preceded by: ʻAisea Taumoepeau
- Succeeded by: Siaosi Taimani ʻAho

Governor of the Haʻapai
- In office 1998–2001

Personal details
- Born: 23 November 1963
- Died: February 10, 2013 (aged 51) Auckland

Sosaia Tupou Aleamotuʻa (23 November 1961 — 10 February 2013), styled Baron Fielakepa of Havelu, was a Tongan public servant and government minister, and a member of Tonga's hereditary nobility.

His father Longolongoʻatumai Aleamotuʻa bore the title of "Lord Fielakepa" before him; Sosaia Aleamotuʻa, as the eldest son and second of six children, inherited it upon his father's death in 1997. Though he had an elder sister, the kingdom's thirty-three titles of hereditary nobility may only be held by men. He also inherited the estates attached to the title, and the traditional responsibilities thereupon.

In 1984, he obtained a Bachelor of Laws degree from the University of Auckland in New Zealand, followed by a Master of Laws degree from the International Maritime Law Institute in Malta in 1996. He entered public service in 1986 as Assistant Secretary in the Tongan Ministry of Justice. He was later appointed Private Secretary to King Taufaʻahau Tupou IV, and clerk to the Privy Council of Tonga. In 1998, he was appointed Governor of the Haʻapai district, a position which entitled him ex officio to a seat in the Legislative Assembly, in Cabinet and in the Privy Council.

In 2001, he was appointed Minister for Lands, Survey and Natural Resources, under Prime Minister Prince Tukuʻaho. As minister, he introduced a number of "procedural simplifications" to the policies of his department. In 2004 he held the position of Attorney General of Tonga for a month following the dismissal of ʻAisea Taumoepeau. From 2008 to 2011, he served as Chairman of the Royal Land Commission.

In 2007, King George Tupou V appointed him Lord Chamberlain - a position which was created for him. Two years later, he was one of the first to be appointed to the equally new position of Law Lord within the Privy Council. He was also one of the only three nobles in Tongan history (at the time) to be elevated to the title of baron (the first having been Baron Vaea in 1970).

Having "suffered from diabetes and heart problems" he died at Auckland City Hospital in New Zealand on 10 February 2013, at the age of fifty-one. Following his death King Tupou VI awarded the Fielakepa title to his younger brother, armed forces commander Tupou Tongapo’uli Aleamotu’a, but this decision was overturned by the Land Court, which ruled in favour of Tupou Tongaliuaki Filo’aulo Aleamotu’a.
