= John Cauchi =

Australian lawyer

Attorney General of Tonga
- In office 25 May 2009 – April 2010
- Preceded by: 'Alisi Afeaki Taumoepeau

Personal details
- Occupation: Lawyer

John Cauchi AM is an Australian lawyer who served as the Attorney General of Tonga from 2009 to 2010.

== Career ==
Cauchi graduated with a master's degree in criminology from the University of Sydney in 1995.

He has had extensive work experience in the South Pacific, from being senior crown counsel with Tonga's Crown Law Department in the 1990s to being senior advisor to the public prosecutor's office in Vanuatu from 2001 to 2003, and Director of Public Prosecutions in the Solomon Islands, from 2004 to 2006.

Cauchi was appointed as Tonga's Attorney General on 25 May 2009. In April 2010, he resigned, citing government interference in the country's legal system. He was the first Attorney General of Tonga not to hold the post of Minister of Justice at the same time. He succeeded 'Alisi Afeaki Taumoepeau. Following his resignation he sued the Tongan government for breach of contract, seeking $480,000 in damages.

In Australia he has served as a senior prosecutor in the Australian Capital Territory and as principal crown counsel in the office of the DPP in Tasmania (during 2009).

== Honours ==
Cauchi was appointed to the status of Senior Counsel in a special session of the Supreme Court in Nukuʻalofa, held on 30 June 2009.

He was appointed a Member of the Order of Australia in the Queen's Birthday Honours in June 2015 for significant service to the law, and to international relations, through leading public administration and legal roles in the South Pacific.

== Personal life ==
He is an Australian citizen.
