= Lord Chancellor (disambiguation) =

For constitutional office-holders called Lord Chancellor, see

- Lord Chancellor of France
- Lord Chancellor, a senior functionary in the government of the United Kingdom
- Lord Chancellor of Ireland
- Lord Chancellor of Scotland
- Lord Chancellor of Tonga
- Lord High Chancellor of Sweden
