= Ombudsman (Tonga) =

Constitutional officer

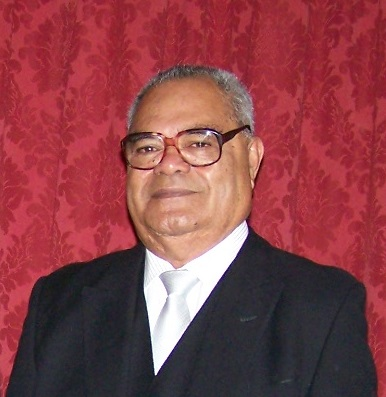
Siaosi Taimani ʻAho, Tonga's first Commissioner for Public Relations.

The Tongan Ombudsman is a constitutional officer in Tonga tasked with investigating maladministration. Established as the Commissioner for Public Relations Act in 2001, the office was renamed to Ombudsman in 2016, and given constitutional status in 2021.

The Ombudsman is appointed by the Speaker of the Legislative Assembly of Tonga with the consent of the Legislative Assembly for a term of 5 years. The current acting Ombudsman is ʻAlisi Afeaki Taumoepeau.

== History ==
In 1998 the Tongan government established the Interim Government Committee on Public Complaints inside the Ministry of Justice to "promote quality service delivery, good administration (fair and responsive), accountability and good governance within government". This was followed in 2001 by legislation establishing a Commissioner for Public Relations. The Commissioner was appointed by the King of Tonga for a term of five years, and had the function of investigating any act, decision, recommendation, or omission relating to a matter of administration by specified government agencies. Where the government's actions were unlawful, unreasonable, unjust, oppressive, or wrong, the Commissioner could make recommendations to the agency, and could report them to the Prime Minister and Privy Council of Tonga.

Siaosi Taimani ʻAho was appointed as the first Commissioner. On his retirement in 2004, he recommended that the office be given greater powers to compel government agencies to release information. The position was then filled by a number of short-term appointments. When Penisimani Tavalu Fonua retired in November 2006, the position was left vacant until ʻAisea Taumoepeau was appointed in 2014.

Legislation in 2016 renamed the position to that of Ombudsman, shifted the power of appointment to the Speaker and Legislative Assembly, and expanded the list of government agencies that fell within the Ombudsman's jurisdiction. Further legislation passed in 2018 and assented in 2021 added the office to the Constitution of Tonga.

== List of Ombudsmen ==
- Siaosi Taimani ʻAho (2001 - 2004)
- Lupeha’amoa ‘Ilaiu (acting) (2004 - 2005)
- Penisimani Tavalu Fonua (2005 - 2006)
- Vacant (2006 - 2014)
- ʻAisea Taumoepeau (2014 - 2023)
- ʻAlisi Afeaki Taumoepeau (acting) (2023 - present)
