= Ramsay Robertson Dalgety =

Scottish and Tongan lawyer and judge

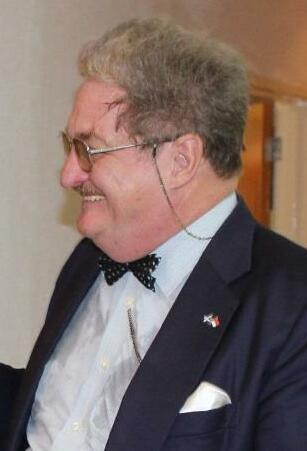
Dalgety in 2017

Ramsay Robertson Dalgety, Lord Dalgety of Sikotilani Tonga is a Scottish and Tongan lawyer and judge. Scottish QC since 1986, and Tonga Law Lord since 2008.

Advocate at the Scottish Bar since 1972. Appointed a Scottish QC in 1986. Temporary sheriff 1987–91.

He became a judge of the Supreme Court of Tonga 1991–95 (sometimes acting Chief Justice of Tonga 1991–94).

Director and chairman of Archer Transport Ltd and Archer Transport (London) Limited 1982–85, Venture Shipping Limited 1983–85. Director Scottish Opera Limited 1980–90, Scottish Opera Theatre Trust Limited 1987–90. Member of Faculty of Advocates 1972, IOD 1982–89. Councillor City of Edinburgh DC 1974–80, chairman Opera Singers' Pension Fund London 1991–92 (trustee 1983–92, deputy chairman 1987–91). Deputy traffic commissioner for Scotland 1988–92, deputy chairman Edinburgh Hibernian Shareholders' Association 1990–92. Vice-president Tonga International Game Fishing Association since 1996 (treasurer 1994–96), tournament director Tonga International Billfish Tournament 1996. He is co-chair of a Tongan Royal Commission and has been chairperson of the Tonga Electric Power Board since 2002.

On 28 July 2008 His Majesty King George Tupou V of Tonga appointed Dalgety as a Law Lord-in-Waiting, as one of the four members of a Judicial Committee of the Tongan Privy Council. He was elevated to the title of Life Peer, as Lord Dalgety of Sikotilani Tonga.

On 26 February 2010 he was arrested for perjury after giving evidence to the Commission of Inquiry into the sinking of the ferry MV Princess Ashika. In November 2010 the charge was quashed by the Supreme Court.

In May 2016, he was appointed Electoral Commissioner. In October 2017 he resigned as chief executive of the Electricity Commission after an inquiry was launched into unaccounted-for pension funds.

== Honours ==
National honours

- Order of Queen Sālote Tupou III, Grand Cross (31 July 2008).
