= Michael Hargreaves Whitten =

Australian jurist

Michael Hargreaves Whitten KC
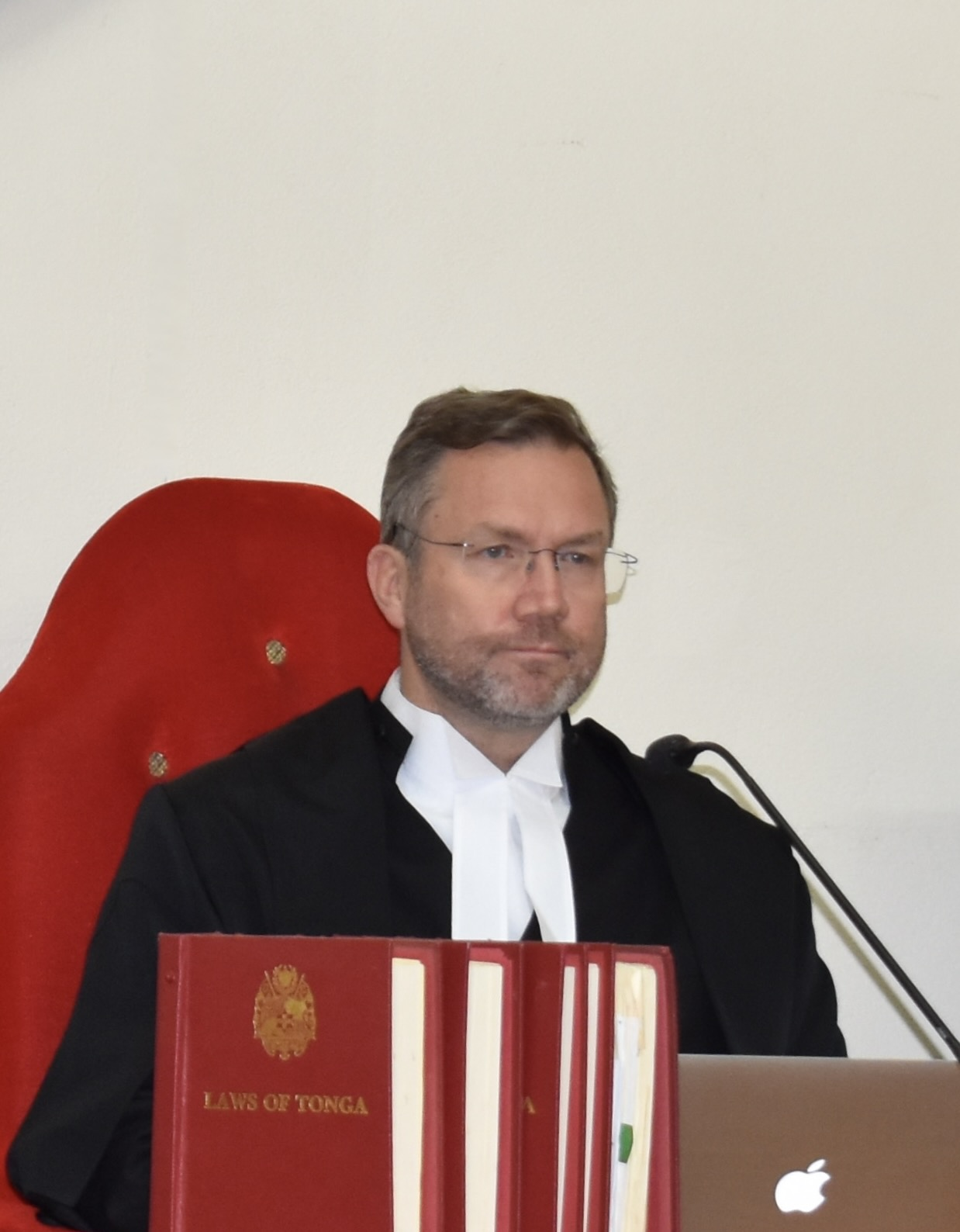
- Whitten sitting in the Court of Appeal of Tonga.

Chief Justice of Tonga
- In office 2 September 2019 – September 2023
- Preceded by: Owen Paulsen
- Succeeded by: Malcolm Bishop KC

Personal details
- Born: Mackay, Queensland

Michael Hargreaves Whitten, KC is an Australian jurist who served as Lord Chief Justice of Tonga from September 2019 to September 2023.

Whitten grew up in Mackay, Queensland and is the son of a butcher and a boiler maker. He worked as a public defender in Brisbane from 1986 to 1988, and then as a clerk for a Queensland District Court judge from 1988 - 1989. In 1990 he was admitted to the Queensland bar, and practiced criminal and family law. He moved to Melbourne in 1996, where he practiced civil and commercial law. In 2015 he was appointed a Queen's Counsel.

In July 2019, he was appointed to the Supreme Court of Tonga as Lord Chief Justice, replacing Owen Paulsen. His term as Chief Justice began on 2 September 2019.

As Chief Justice, he presided over the appeal of former Prime Minister Sialeʻataongo Tuʻivakanō against his bribery, money laundering and firearms convictions, and over the electoral petition which saw cabinet minister Sione Sangster Saulala lose his seat following the 2021 Tongan general election.

In 2020 his home in Tonga was destroyed by Cyclone Harold.

He retired as chief justice in September 2023.
