= ʻAminiasi Kefu =

Tongan lawyer and civil servant

Attorney General of Tonga
- In office 26 June 2014 – 21 March 2019
- Prime Minister: Sialeʻataongo Tuʻivakanō ʻAkilisi Pōhiva
- Preceded by: Neil Adsett
- Succeeded by: Linda Folaumoetu'i

ʻAsipeli ʻAminiasi Kefu is a Tongan lawyer and civil servant who has served as Solicitor General of Tonga. From 2014 to 2019 he was acting Attorney General of Tonga.

Kefu was educated at Tonga High School and Nelson College. He studied law at the University of Waikato and Victoria University of Wellington, where he wrote a Masters thesis on "Recent constitutional developments in Tonga : where to now?". He later studied public sector management at Massey University. He worked as an assistant legal officer for Tonga's Crown Law Department from 1997 and became a Senior Crown Counsel in 2002. In July 2008 he became acting Solicitor General. The appointment was made permanent in April 2009. As Solicitor-General, he was responsible for prosecutions over the 2006 Nukuʻalofa riots, including the unsuccessful prosecution of pro-democracy members of Parliament. He also gave evidence at the inquiry into the sinking of the MV Princess Ashika, and managed the subsequent criminal prosecutions.

Following the departure of Attorney-General Neil Adsett he became acting Attorney-General. While expected to be a short-term position, Kefu remained in the role until he was replaced by Linda Folaumoetu'i in March 2019. In February 2015 he was accused of interfering with the judiciary over his sentencing recommendation for former Speaker of the legislative Assembly Lord Tuʻilakepa. In 2017 he defended King Tupou VI's controversial decision to dissolve the legislative assembly and call early elections in an unsuccessful effort to unseat the elected government of ʻAkilisi Pōhiva.

After retiring as Attorney-General in 2019 he moved to New Zealand, where he became a crown prosecutor and served on the board of rugby team Moana Pasifika.
