= ʻAlisi Afeaki Taumoepeau =

Tongan politician

- Malia Viviena ʻAlisi Nunia Taumoepeau

Acting Ombudsman of Tonga
- Incumbent
- Assumed office 18 February 2023
- Preceded by: ʻAisea Taumoepeau

Minister of Justice
- In office 17 May 2006 – 31 May 2009
- Monarch: King George Tupou V
- Prime Minister: Dr. Feleti Sevele
- Preceded by: Siaosi Taimani ʻAho
- Succeeded by: Samiu Vaipulu

Attorney General of Tonga
- In office 17 May 2006 – 31 May 2009
- Monarch: King George Tupou V
- Prime Minister: Dr. Feleti Sevele
- Preceded by: Siaosi Taimani ʻAho
- Succeeded by: John Cauchi

Personal details
- Spouse: ʻAisea Taumoepeau

ʻAlisi Afeaki Taumoepeau is a Tongan politician. She became the first woman to hold a Cabinet post in Tonga when she was named Attorney general and Minister of Justice in 2006.

== Career ==
Malia Viviena ʻAlisi Nunia Taumoepeau studied law at Victoria University of Wellington in New Zealand, becoming the first Tongan woman with a degree in the subject. She had initially wanted to study medicine and mathematics but was not accepted for a scholarship. She turned to law at the suggestion of her father, Pousima ʻAfeaki. Upon returning to Tonga she worked at the Crown Law Office for several years. By 2004 she had become solicitor general for the country. At the same time her husband ʻAisea Taumoepeau jointly held the posts of attorney general and Minister for Justice but was asked to resign. She was also pressured to resign by Prime Minister Fatafehi Tuʻipelehake, following her support of civil servants during a strike.

When Taumoepeau was named jointly as attorney general and Minister for Justice in 2006 it was the first time that a Tongan woman had been named to a cabinet post within the Tongan Government.

She was asked to resign her posts by the Tongan government, which she did effective May 31, 2009. Following her resignation her former role was split into two, with John Cauchi succeeding her as attorney general, and Samiu Vaipulu becoming the new Minister of Justice. At the time there was no official comment but it was later reported that it was after she mislead the Cabinet. Following the resignation of Cauchi from the attorney general post, she agreed with his allegations that both resignations were after the Cabinet interfered in the country's legal system.

In September 2020 she was made a King's Counsel. She then worked as chief executive for the Office of the Ombudsman.

In February 2023 she was sworn in as acting Ombudsman, replacing her husband, ʻAisea Taumoepeau.

== Honours ==
National honours

- Order of Queen Sālote Tupou III, Grand Cross (31 July 2008).

Legal offices
Preceded by Siaosi Taimani ʻAho	Attorney General of Tonga; 2006–2009	Succeeded by John Cauchi
Political offices
Preceded by Siaosi Taimani ʻAho	Minister of Justice; 2006–2009	Succeeded by Samiu Vaipulu
Government offices
Preceded by ʻAisea Taumoepeau	Acting Ombudsman of Tonga; 2023–present	Incumbent
