= Sean O'Brien (windsurfer) =

Australian professional windsurfer

Personal information
- Nationality: Australian
- Born: 6 January 1984 (age 42) Brisbane, Australia
- Height: 1.85 m (6 ft 1 in)
- Weight: 85 kg (187 lb)

Sport
- Country: Australia
- Sport: Sailing
- Event: Windsurfing
- Club: Royal Queensland Yacht Squadron

Sean O'Brien (born 6 January 1984 in Brisbane) is an Australian professional windsurfer competing on the PWA World Tour and the International Formula Windsurfing Class Tour. He was ranked 7th in the World in Formula Windsurfing in 2012 and has won 11 Australian Windsurfing Titles across three racing disciplines, the most of any Australian windsurfer.

== Early life ==
O'Brien grew up in Brisbane, Australia, finishing high school at Marist College Ashgrove as a notable alumni. He earned a Bachelor of Psychological Science/Biomedical Science degree at the University of Queensland in 2004.

== Career ==
In 2018, O'Brien won his 8th Oceanic & Australian Title in Formula Windsurfing at the Downunder Pro at Royal Queensland Yacht Squadron in Brisbane.

== Coaching ==
O'Brien worked for three years as the windsurfing coach for the QLD State High Performance Sailing unit at Royal Queensland Yacht Squadron club in Brisbane. During this term he successfully qualified Australian youth sailors Luke Baillie and Joanna Sterling to represent Australia at the Volvo Youth Sailing ISAF World Championships in 2009 and Joanna again in 2010.

Later he coached five-time Olympian and two-time PBA World Champion Jessica Crisp to her first ISAF World Cup gold medal in 2009 at the SailMelbourne regatta and a clean sweep of the Australian Sail-Downunder Series by also taking gold in the SailSydney regatta at Woollahra Sailing Club in the RS:X Olympic class.

== Olympic campaign ==
O'Brien campaigned for the 2008 Beijing Olympics on the RS:X Olympic board for two years during 2006–2007 before a back injury ended his campaign in late 2007, despite winning the 2007 Australian Olympic Windsurfing Championships and being in the box seat for a successful Beijing Olympics berth.

== Personal life ==
O'Brien works in digital media design as owner of the international agency, Brisbane Digital Agency. He divides his time between summer in Australia and winter in Europe to compete on the Pro Windsurfing Tours and contribute to the tours as a committee member of the International Formula Windsurfing Class.

He is based in Poland with his son, John O'Brien and partner Agata, the grand-daughter of prominent Polish military general Mieczysław Dachowski.

In 2012 O'Brien launched the first ever windsurfing fitness training program GetWindsurfFit in conjunction with his trainer Nic Pillonel from Switzerland. The book was widely received and is being translated into another three languages for future release.

== Professional status ==
- Member of IFWC International Committee
- Vice-President Australian Windsurfing Association 2010–2011
- Australian Sailing Team Windsurfing Coach 2009
- QLD State High Performance Sailing Coach 2008–2010
- Part of the international racing and development teams for Severne, Starboard.

== Sporting achievements ==
Year	Competition	Venue	Position	Event
2002	Australian Formula Windsurfing Championships	(Australia) Melbourne, VIC		Formula Windsurfing (Youth)
2004	Australian Formula Windsurfing Championships	(Australia) Sydney, NSW		Formula Windsurfing (Youth)
2006	Australian Formula Windsurfing Championships	(Australia) Melbourne, VIC		Formula Windsurfing
2007	Australian Formula Windsurfing Championships	(Australia) Fremantle, WA		Formula Windsurfing
2007	Australian RS:X Championships	(Australia) Sydney, NSW		RS:X
2009	Australian Formula Windsurfing Championships	(Australia) Sydney, NSW		Formula Windsurfing
2009	Norwegian Windsurfing Championships	Larvik, Norway		Formula Windsurfing
2010	Australian Formula Windsurfing Championships	(Australia) Hawks Nest, NSW		Formula Windsurfing
2011	Australian Formula Windsurfing Championships	(Australia) Hawks Nest, NSW		Formula Windsurfing
2012	Australian Formula Windsurfing Championships	(Australia) Hawks Nest, NSW		Formula Windsurfing
2012	Asian Windsurfing Championships	Singapore		Formula Windsurfing
2012	PWA Slalom World Cup	(South Korea) Ulsan, Korea	24th	Slalom
2013	Australian Slalom Championships	(Australia) Green Island, QLD		Slalom
2014	Australian Slalom Championships	(Australia) Green Island, QLD		Slalom
2014	PWA Slalom World Cup	Awaza, Turkmenistan	13th	Slalom
2014	Australian Formula Windsurfing Championships	(Australia) Sydney, NSW		Formula Windsurfing
2018	Australian Formula Windsurfing Championships	(Australia) Brisbane, QLD		Formula Windsurfing
2018	Formula Windsurfing European Championships Series	(Italy) Gallipoli		Formula Windsurfing

- 3rd Place - 2018 European Formula Windsurfing Championships
- Ranked number 7 in the World in Formula Windsurfing 2012
- 8x Australian & Oceanic Formula Windsurfing Champion
- 2x Australian Slalom Champion
- 2012 Asian Windsurfing Champion
- 2009 Norwegian Windsurfing Champion
- 2007 Australian Olympic Windsurfing Champion
