= Owen Paulsen =

New Zealand jurist

The Honourable Owen Paulsen

Justice of the High Court
- Incumbent
- Assumed office 15 November 2025

Associate Judge of the High Court of New Zealand
- In office 2 August 2019 – 14 November 2025

Chief Justice of Tonga
- In office January 2015 – July 2019
- Preceded by: Michael Dishington Scott
- Succeeded by: Michael Hargreaves Whitten

Personal details
- Education: University of Canterbury (LLB); University of Auckland (LLM)

Owen Paulsen is a Tongan and New Zealand jurist who served as Chief Justice of Tonga from 2015 to 2019. Since August 2019 he has been an associate judge of the High Court of New Zealand, and a Judge of the High Court of New Zealand since 2025.

== Early life and education ==
Owen Paulsen was educated at Shirley Boys' High School. He graduated from the University of Canterbury with a Bachelor of Laws degree in 1986, and from the University of Auckland with a Master of Laws degree in 2011. He worked as a solicitor for Harman & Co and became a partner at the firm in 1991; he remained at the firm until 1998. He was an adjudication and mediation member of the Employment Tribunal from 2000 to 2001. He joined Cavell Leitch Law as the head litigation partner and worked at the firm from 2001 to 2014.

== Career ==
Chief Justice of Tonga Michael Dishington Scott was replaced by Paulsen in January 2015. As Chief Justice he quashed the sacking of Tonga Broadcasting Commission directors 'Eseta Fusitu'a and Tunakaimanu Fielakepa, and oversaw the corruption trial of government minister ʻEtuate Lavulavu. He also oversaw the TONGASAT case, which found that US$50 million paid to Tongasat by the government of China was invalid and unlawful.

In July 2019, Paulsen resigned as Chief Justice after being appointed as an associate justice of the High Court of New Zealand. Michael Hargreaves Whitten was selected to replace him as chief justice. On 10 October 2025, it was announced Paulsen would be appointed as a Justice of the High Court of New Zealand based in Christchurch; his appointment was effective on 15 November.
