= Petula =

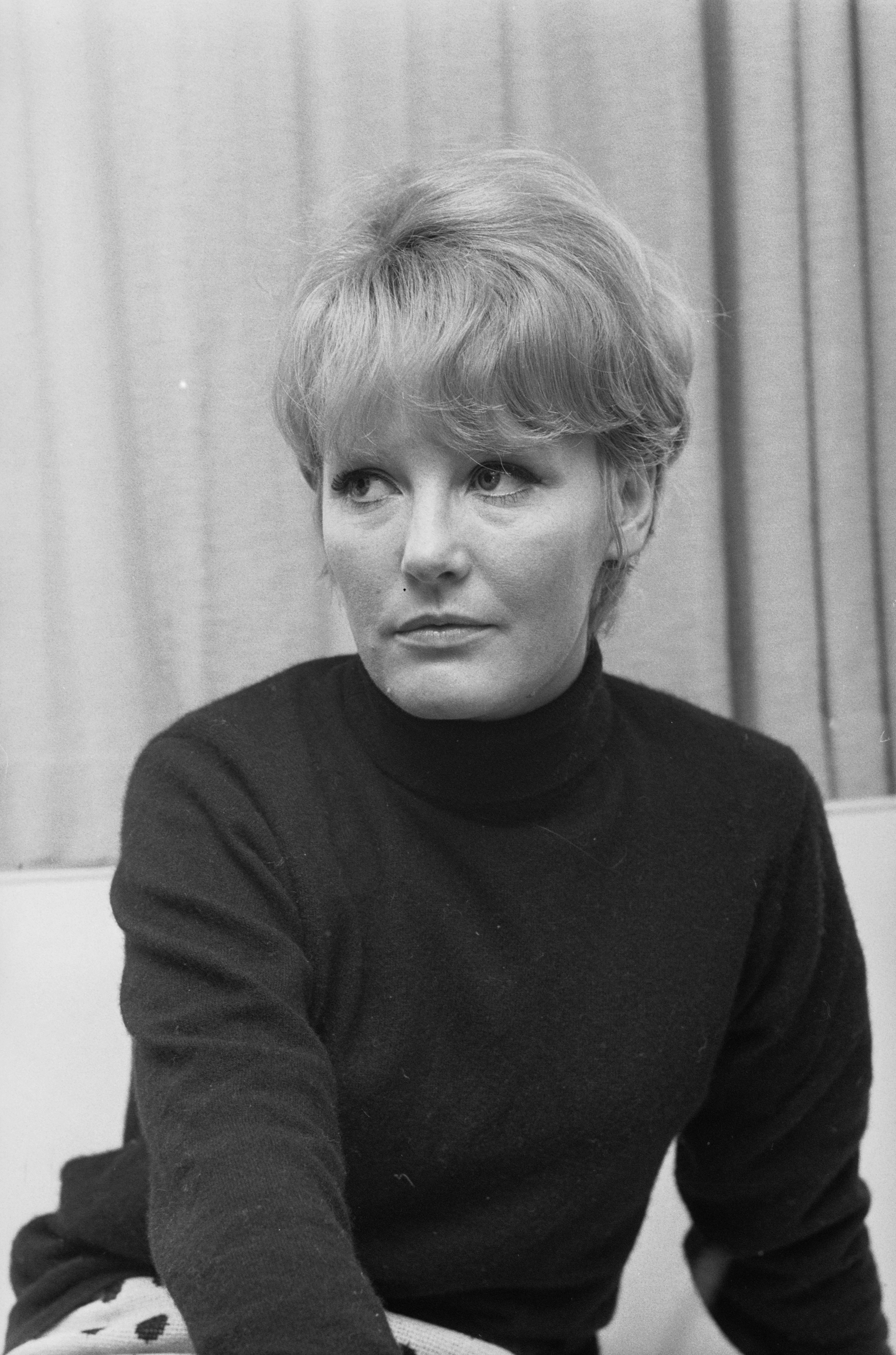
- British singer Petula Clark (born 1932), pictured in 1966
- Pronunciation: English: /pəˈtjuːlə/; English: /pɛtʃuːlə/
- Gender: Feminine
- Language: English

Origin
- Meaning: Modern invention

Other names
- Related names: Petunia

Petula is an English feminine given name of uncertain origin. The best-known bearer of the name is British entertainer Petula Clark, whose given name is Sally and for whom Petula was a childhood pet name invented by her father. The name has also been in occasional use as an independent given name throughout the Anglosphere.

== Etymology ==
The name might be a modern invention based on the flower name petunia, or an elaboration of the English term of endearment "pet" in combination with the suffix -ula as in the name Ursula. Petula might also be derived from the Late Latin petulare, meaning "supplicant".

== Women ==
- Petula Louise "Patty" Brard (born 1955), Dutch-Indonesian entertainer
- Dawn Petula Butler (born 1969), British Labour Party politician
- Sally "Petula" Clark (born 1932), British singer, actress, and songwriter

== Fictional characters ==
- Petula, lead character played by Rachel Weisz in the 2000 film Beautiful Creatures
- Petula, a sheep character in the cartoon show Littlest Pet Shop: A World of Our Own
- Petula, character played by Hayley McFarland in three episodes of the Showtime dramedy United States of Tara
- Petula, Disney comic character, the sister of Pete and hostess of the cooking show Petula's Pantry
- Petula, lead character and iconic image for the Molly Moon series of children's novels by Georgia Byng, being the title character's pet pug
- Petula Giordino, character played by Julie Walters in the BBC One sitcom dinnerladies
- Petula Lorry, one-shot character in the DC Comics series Batman, being featured in Issue 287 (May 1977)
- Petula the Parrot, African parrot in the Belgian cartoon series 64 Zoo Lane
- Miss Petula Perpetual-Motion, character in the book World's Worst Children by David Walliams

== In music ==
- Petula, 1968 album release by Petula Clark
- "It's Up to You, Petula", 1971 single by Edison Lighthouse
