= Robert Luke Deakin =

Australian entrepreneur

Robert Luke Deakin is an Australian social entrepreneur and cyber security expert, born in Nambour, Queensland, in 1966. He established a Melbourne-based social enterprise in 2016, which focuses on children at risk of social isolation, particularly children diagnosed with autism spectrum disorders (ASD). He also provides advice to selected organisations on national cyber security, particularly in the area of critical infrastructure protection, economic information warfare and development of the Australian Cyber Security Workforce.

== Social enterprise ==
Deakin has identified specific ways that children with ASD are attracted to certain types of play, in particular the systematic nature of construction systems such as Lego. In 2011, he hired space at the Abbotsford Convent and started running Brick Clubs. These clubs provided families affected by autism with an opportunity for children to meet and share their interest in the Lego system and afforded respite for families.

Deakin used his knowledge of construction play to improve social interaction and communication among children who have social difficulties. In particular, the Brick Clubs use social play strategies to reinforce appropriate behaviours, improve interaction and enhance the communication between children.

In 2012, Deakin was awarded a Churchill Fellowship, which allowed him to visit Singapore, the United States, Canada, the United Kingdom and Denmark to learn about establishing national programmes to assist young children with autism to overcome social isolation and to help build friendships.

Deakin is an alumnus of "The Crunch", one of Australia's most highly respected and rigorous social enterprise start-up programs run by social traders with the Melbourne Business School at the University of Melbourne. Brick Club was scaled up after completion of the Crunch Program with the establishment of a studio in Fairfield, Victoria. The number of sessions available to families was increased at the studio and broader advocacy of the need for social opportunities also increased. Deakin has provided support and advocacy to many local communities to establish their own local Brick Club operations.

The growth of Brick Clubs was funded entirely through the social enterprise activities. The enterprise raises funds from large-scale public events, school programmes and other activities that focus science, technology, engineering and mathematics (STEM), especially Lego Model Exhibitions, Lego Serious Play, robotics, 3D printing, children's coding and Minecraft games. Many hundreds of organisations now continue to encourage and support LEGO use in a wide variety of social developmental modes and so Deakin was able to eventually wind down his direct involvement in clubs and return a focus on the security quandaries in Cyber and AI.

The concept of brick based clubs and play events to bring children together has spread rapidly driven by a multitude of entities from individual local champions to global organisations, who share a dream of using LEGO for social connection and encouraging children's curiosity. Many non-profit now aims to improve the lives of disadvantaged children by providing them with access to interactive social play. Just a few examples include; Build to Express is used by educators and therapists around the world, using special LEGO sets to help children express emotions, ideas, and understand complex concepts. LEGO bricks are now used in ‘play based’ therapy for children by numerous therapeutic organisations (e.g. Sensational Kids, Spencer Health, Making Connections ). Fairy Bricks (UK) is a charity that donates LEGO sets to children's hospitals and hospices to brighten the lives of sick children and Little Bricks also works with hospitals and schools to provide therapeutic and educational LEGO play sessions. BrickDreams (USA) is an example of one of hundreds of grass roots charities that collects and donates used LEGO bricks to children in need. In contrast Bricks 4 Kidz has emerged as an international organisation that provides programs to teach the principles of science, technology, engineering, and math (STEM) using LEGO bricks it provides thousands of engaging workshops, camps, and events for children.

Affiliated with the LEGO Group, is the LEGO Foundation itself which operates as a significant non-profit foundation. Its mission is to inspire and develop the builders of tomorrow through play. The foundation collaborates with organizations worldwide to utilize LEGO for learning and therapy.

== Education ==
Deakin attended Caloundra Primary School, boarded at Marist College Ashgrove Secondary College in Brisbane where he completed his Secondary Certificate in 1983. He graduated with a Bachelor of Business in information management in 1990 from the Queensland University of Technology and a Graduate Certificate of IT in data security in 1993 from the Information Security Research Centre. He studied under Emeritus Professor William Caelli and completed a Master of Information Technology by research in 2003 on the concept of "Economic Information Warfare : Analysis of the relationship between the protection of Financial Information Infrastructure and Australia's National Security".

== Career ==
Deakin's professional background is not in disability or education. His career was centred around emerging threats from dependence on technology. In the early 1980s, he focused on computer viruses and then the impact of distributed computing on business. He later specialised in national critical infrastructure protection, particularly protection of banking systems. He represented the Australian Bankers Association on the Business-Government Task Force on Critical Infrastructure Protection. He held various security roles as an independent security consultant and worked for the Attorney General's Department (Queensland), the National Australia Bank, Pricewaterhouse Coopers, Telstra, Department of Prime Minister and Cabinet (Australia) and the Department of Home Affairs (Australia).
