= Michael Dishington Scott =

Chief Justice of Tonga
- In office 27 September 2010 – January 2015
- Preceded by: Tony Ford
- Succeeded by: Owen Paulsen

Michael Dishington Scott was Chief Justice of Tonga.

Scott is a British national with a long career in the Pacific. He has previously served as a judge in Kiribati and the Solomon Islands, and served for 14 years as a judge on the High Court of Fiji. As a High Court judge in Fiji, in Yabaki v President of the Republic of the Fiji Islands, he ruled that the interim government established in the wake of the 2000 Fijian coup d'état was legal. This ruling was later overturned on appeal. From 2004 to 2007 he was a judge of the Fijian Court of Appeal.

He was appointed Chief Justice of Tonga in August 2010, replacing Tony Ford. He assumed the role on 27 September 2010. He was replaced by Owen Paulsen in January 2015. In June 2017 he was appointed to the Judicial Committee of the Privy Council of Tonga as a Law Lord.
