= Petunia (given name) =

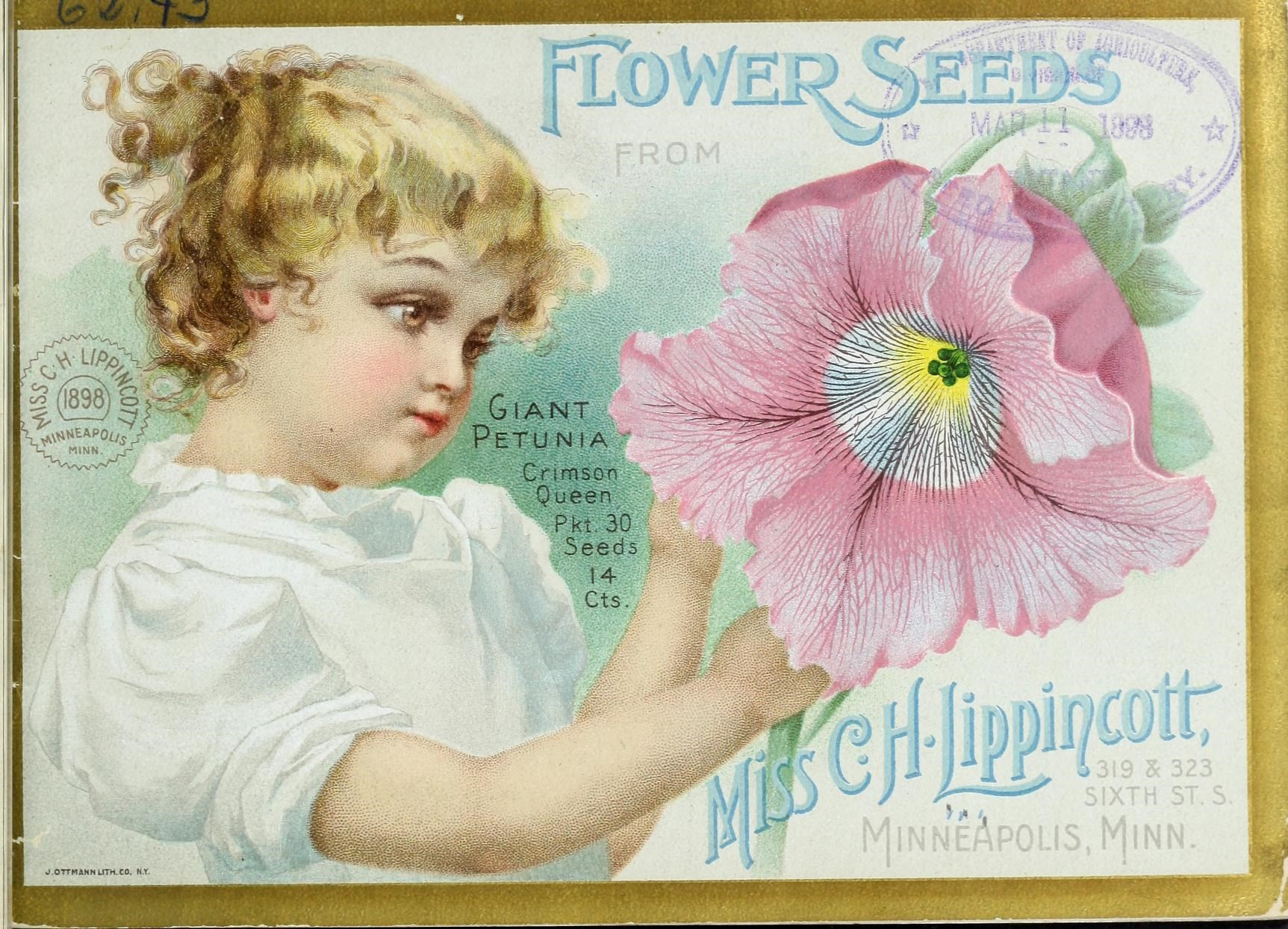
- A young girl admires a giant petunia, from an illustration in the 1898 Henry G. Gilbert Nursery and Seed Trade Catalog.
- Pronunciation: English: /pɛˈtuːniə/; English: /pəˈtuːniə/
- Gender: Feminine

Origin
- Meaning: Flower of Petunia
- Region of origin: English, Scottish, German

Other names
- Variant forms: Patunia, Patuna, Petula
- Short forms: Pet, Tunie

Petunia is an English and Scottish feminine given name derived from the name for the flower.

== Usage ==
The name has been in rare use throughout the Anglosphere and elsewhere since the 19th century along with other botanical names that came into fashion during the Victorian era. It is also a common pet name.

== Women ==
- Petunia Tupou, Tongan lawyer and jurist

== Fiction ==
- Petunia from The Angry Birds Movie
- Petunia from Happy Tree Friends
- Petunia Dursley from Harry Potter
- Petunia Pig, an animated cartoon character in the Looney Tunes and Merrie Melodies series of cartoons from Warner Bros.
- Petunia Pretty Paws from Geronimo Stilton
- Petunia Rhubarb from VeggieTales
