= ʻElisapeti Langi =

Tongan lawyer and judge

ʻElisapeti Lavakeiʻaho Makoni Langi is a Tongan lawyer and judge. She was the first woman appointed as a magistrate in Tonga, and also the first to serve on the Supreme Court of Tonga.

Langi was educated at the University of the South Pacific, initially studying foundation studies before completing a law degree at the Emalus campus in Vanuatu. She worked as a legal assistant in a community law center before becoming a Crown Prosecutor for the Tongan Attorney General's office. In March 2018 she was appointed as a Senior Magistrate, becoming the second woman appointed to such a role in Tonga. In September 2020 she was appointed as an acting justice to the Supreme Court of Tonga, becoming the first woman to serve on the court.

== Education ==
In 1992, ʻElisapeti Langi enrolled in the University of the South Pacific (USP) in Foundation studies. Soon after, she was given the chance to study Information Technology in Sydney, Australia, before finishing her degree, so she left the USP to further improve her education. However, according to her interview in 'The Conch', she found herself in a 'dire situation' due to the loss of family support and the challenges of raising a child on her own. Ms ʻElisapeti Langi returned to Tonga three years later without completing her course in Information Technology. After arriving she completed her Foundation studies at the USP, and in 2004 she was accepted as a private student at the Emalus School of Law in Port Vila, Vanuatu. In early 2007, she completed her Professional Diploma in Legal Practice in Suva, then moved back to Tonga and was admitted to the bar later that year.

== Career ==
Her first professional position within the legal system was an assistant at the Community Legal Center, which was established to help low-income earners involved in the Tonga riots in 2006. She became a Legal Officer at the Attorney General's Office in 2008, where she stayed for ten years before joining the Judiciary. Her primary position at the Attorney-General's Office was that of Crown Prosecutor. When she joined the Magistrate Court in 2018, she became the Tongan Judiciary's only female Judicial Officer.

In October 2009, ʻElisapeti Langi was appointed as a counsel for the Royal Commission for Enquiry's investigation into the sinking of MV Princess Ashika. The inquiry later found that the Princess Ashika had not been surveyed prior to being purchased by the Tongan government and that unfavourable surveys by the Fiji Marine Board were not brought to the attention of the Tongan authorities.

In 2012, as part of her role as a Crown Council, she attended the Regional Counter Terrorism Seminar in Cairns, Australia.

In 2014, ʻElisapeti Langi was involved in the UN Pacific Regional Anti-Corruption Project (UN-PRAC).This was a coordination between several pacific nations to audit and reduce the amount of corruption within government agencies.

In 2015, ʻElisapeti Langi was part of the government board that looked at the outcomes of the "Less planning, more action - A New Approach to Pacific Island Bêche-de-mer (BdM) Fisheries", a plan to improve the situation of the Tongan fishing industry.

In 2019, the Australian National University invited ʻElisapeti Langi to a symposium on family protection orders in the Pacific region. During this, she gave a talk about the Tongan legal system's implementation of for rulings on divorce and the care for children in these legal proceedings. She also gave details about her own thoughts and ideas about the system's importance, given she was a Judicial Officer who was also a woman and a mother.

Ms Langi was appointed as an Acting Supreme Court Judge for six months in 2020 to help with the wave of drug-related cases that had flooded the Supreme Court. This was a historic appointment for her as it was the first time a female was appointed to the Supreme Court of Tonga.

== Supreme Court Appointment ==
In 2020, under strain from the increased drug offences seen in the Tongan criminal system, the supreme court gained approval from King Topou VI for the appointment of ʻElisapeti Langi to the Supreme Court as an acting judge. She was specifically chosen for her long service in legal system, serving in the Magistracy for three years as a Senior Magistrate, as well as prior being an Assistant Senior Crown Prosecutor for ten years. ʻElisapeti Langi was also noted for handling important and high-profile cases such as the first prosecution under the Computer Misuse Act, and as counsel for the Royal Commission for Inquiry for the sinking of MV Princess Ashika. Her earned respect both home and abroad was also listed, with her Australian Leadership Award being cited as being extremely prestigious. However, there were concerns that her appointment was rushed, and that the process of her appointment lacked the necessary scrutiny that candidates for the Supreme Court bench must go through. She was given a welcoming ceremony on 31 August 2020.

In March 2022, ʻElisapeti Langi was featured in an article about her career and gave an interview about her views on becoming the first female judge on the Tongan supreme court. In 'The Conch', a University of South Pacific newsletter and magazine, she stated "By our mere presence, women judges increase the court's legitimacy, sending a powerful message that they are open and accessible to those seeking recourse to justice,". She also said "Women judges, in my opinion, contribute far more to justice than simply improving its appearance; we can also make a significant contribution to the quality of decision making, and thus to the quality of justice itself".
