= William Kenneth Horne =

British barrister and politician (1883–1959)

Sir William Kenneth Horne (1883 – 8 February 1959) was a British barrister, colonial judge, and Speaker of the Legislative Council of Kenya from 1948 to 1954.

Horne practiced at the English bar from 1913 to 1915, then fought in the First World War from 1915 to 1918. He then returned to private practice (or "was for many years abroad") until 1925, when he was appointed Chief Justice of Tonga. From February to September 1929, he served as Chief Justice of Fiji and Chief Judicial Commissioner for the Western Pacific.

From 1929 to 1933, he was a judge of the Supreme Court of the Gambia, and from 1933 to 1937, he was a judge of the Supreme Court of Kenya. From 1937 to 1942, he was a Puisne Judge of the Supreme Court of the Strait Settlements. From 1942 to 1944, he was in East Africa on war service.

In 1944, he was seconded to Kenya as a judge of the Supreme Court. He retired in 1948, and was Speaker of the Kenya Legislative Council from 1948 to 1955, when he retired. Knighted in 1954 "for public services in Kenya," he settled in Banbury, Oxfordshire, where he died.
