= Peter McPhee (cricketer) =

Australian cricketer (born 1963)

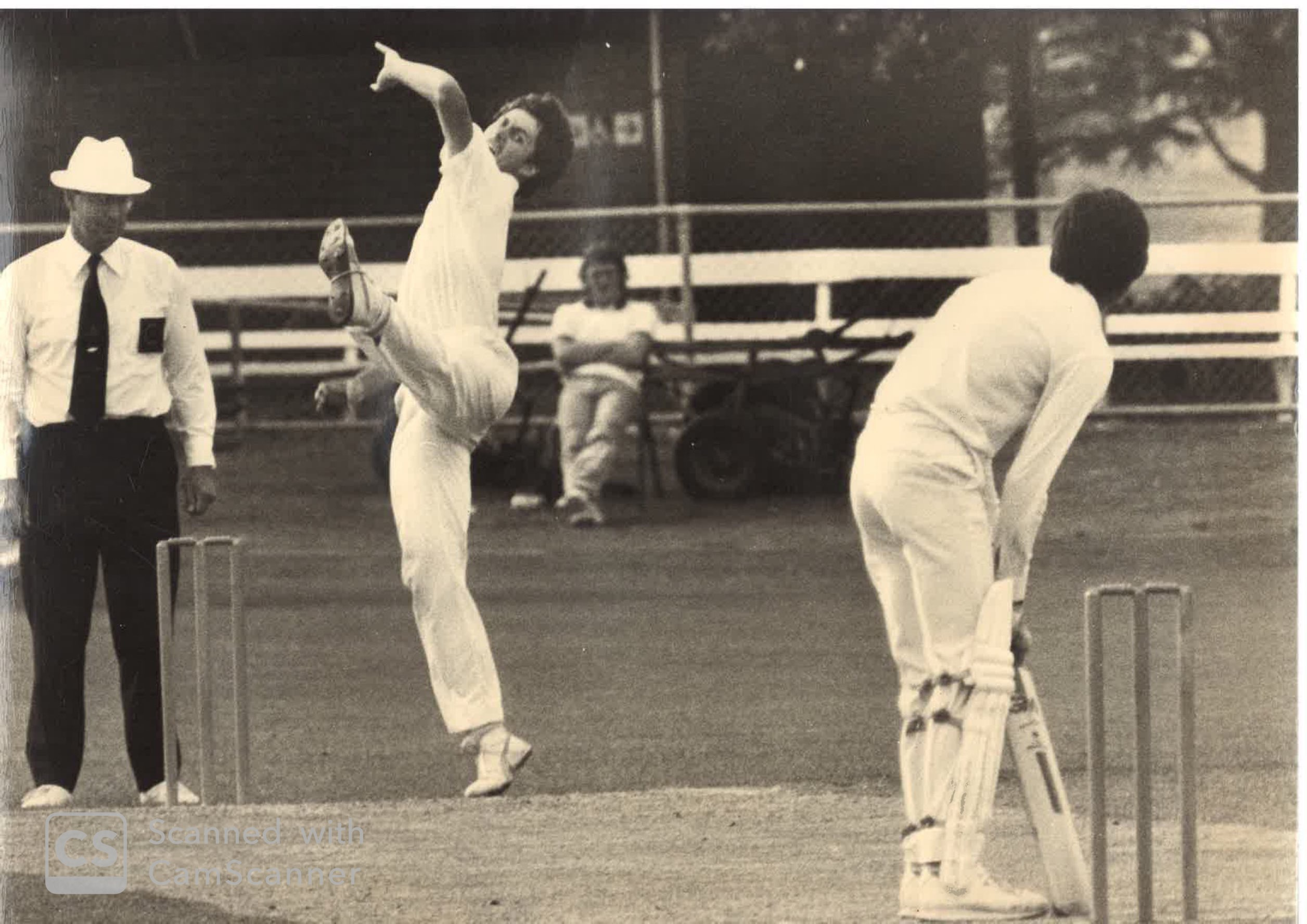
Peter McPhee

Peter Thomas McPhee (born 29 July 1963) was an Australian cricketer who played for the Tasmanian Tigers. He represented Australia in 3 Youth Tests against Pakistan in 1981/2, dismissing Salik Malik in 5 of 6 innings. He was the Tasmanian First Class Player of the year in 1990/91, taking a then state record of 43 wickets in the 10 Sheffield Shield matches. McPhee represented the Prime Minister's XI in 1992 and took a wicket with his debut ball in both first-class cricket and one-day domestic cricket.
