= 1987 Tongan general election =

General elections were held in Tonga on 18 and 19 February 1987 to elect members of the Legislative Assembly of Tonga. Nine nobles and nine people's representatives were elected. Five of the latter favoured democratic reform.

== Results ==
Six of the nine People's Representatives were new to the Legislative Assembly, including Sione Matekihetuka, Laki Niu and ʻAkilisi Pōhiva from the Tongatapu constituency.

Party	Votes	%	Seats
Pro-reform candidates			5
Anti-reform candidates			4
Nobles' representatives			9
Ministers			10
Total			28
Total votes	25,281	–	
Registered voters/turnout	42,496	59.49	
Source: Nohlen et al.
