= Attorney General of Tonga =

- Incumbent; Linda Folaumoetu'i since 2019

The Attorney General of Tonga is Tonga's chief law officer, responsible for supervising Tongan law and advising the government on legal matters. Originally a Cabinet position held jointly with the portfolio of Minister of Justice, the office was made independent in 2009. The current Attorney General is Linda Folaumoetu'i.

== History and role ==
The position of attorney general was established in the Kingdom of Tonga in 1988. From 1988 to 2009, the Attorney General jointly held the office of Minister of Justice.

The Attorney-General is "First Law Officer for the Government of the Kingdom of Tonga". its responsibilities include providing legal advice, drafting legislation, and conducting prosecutions and representing the crown in civil matters, as well as "supporting constitutional integrity and governance" and "facilitating [the] Government’s lawful and responsible legal dealings"

Following constitutional reforms in January 2012, the Attorney General is reportedly

"the principal legal advisor to Cabinet and Government, and with the Solicitor General and other law officers will be responsible for prosecutions and legal cases for and against the government, the drafting of legislation for the Government and parliament, and generally for ensuring that the Constitution and laws of Tonga are understood and upheld by Government and individuals".

== Lists of attorneys general ==
- Tevita Poasi Tupou (1988–2003) (1st Attorney General who was also referred to as the Minister of Justice)
- ʻAisea Taumoepeau (2003–2004) (also Minister of Justice)
- Baron Fielakepa (2004)
- Siaosi Taimani ʻAho (2004–2006) (also Minister of Justice)
- ʻAlisi Afeaki Taumoepeau (2006–2009) (first female Minister of Justice & Attorney General; Wife of ʻAisea Taumoepeau)
- John Cauchi (2009–2010)
- Samiu Vaipulu (2010–2011)
- Barrie Sweetman (2012) (Interim Attorney General)
- Neil Adsett (2012–2014)
- ʻAminiasi Kefu (2014–2019) (Acting)
- Linda Folaumoetu'i (2019–)

John Cauchi, appointed in May 2009, was the first Attorney General not to hold the portfolio of Justice Minister. He was also the first non-Tongan to hold the office, being an Australian citizen. He resigned the position on 30 April 2010. It is not currently clear how many people held the position between Cauchi's resignation and Sweetman's appointment. In early 2011, the CIA Factbook stated the Attorney General was ʻAsipeli ʻAminiasi Kefu. However this may have been an error, as other sources described Kefu as the Solicitor General. Minister for Justice Samiu Vaipulu was the Attorney General just prior to Sweetman's appointment; the latter thus disassociated the two positions, which had once again been combined in a single person.

As of August 2011, the Kingdom has had at least seven Attorneys General. Matangi Tonga has noted that three of the country's Attorneys General (namely Tupou and both Taumoepeaus) "have been told to resign".

== List of ministers of justice (post–2009) ==
- Samiu Vaipulu (2009–2010)
- Clive Edwards (2011–2014)
- Sione Vuna Fa'otusia (2014–2020)
