= Petunia Peak =

Mountain in Washington (state), United States

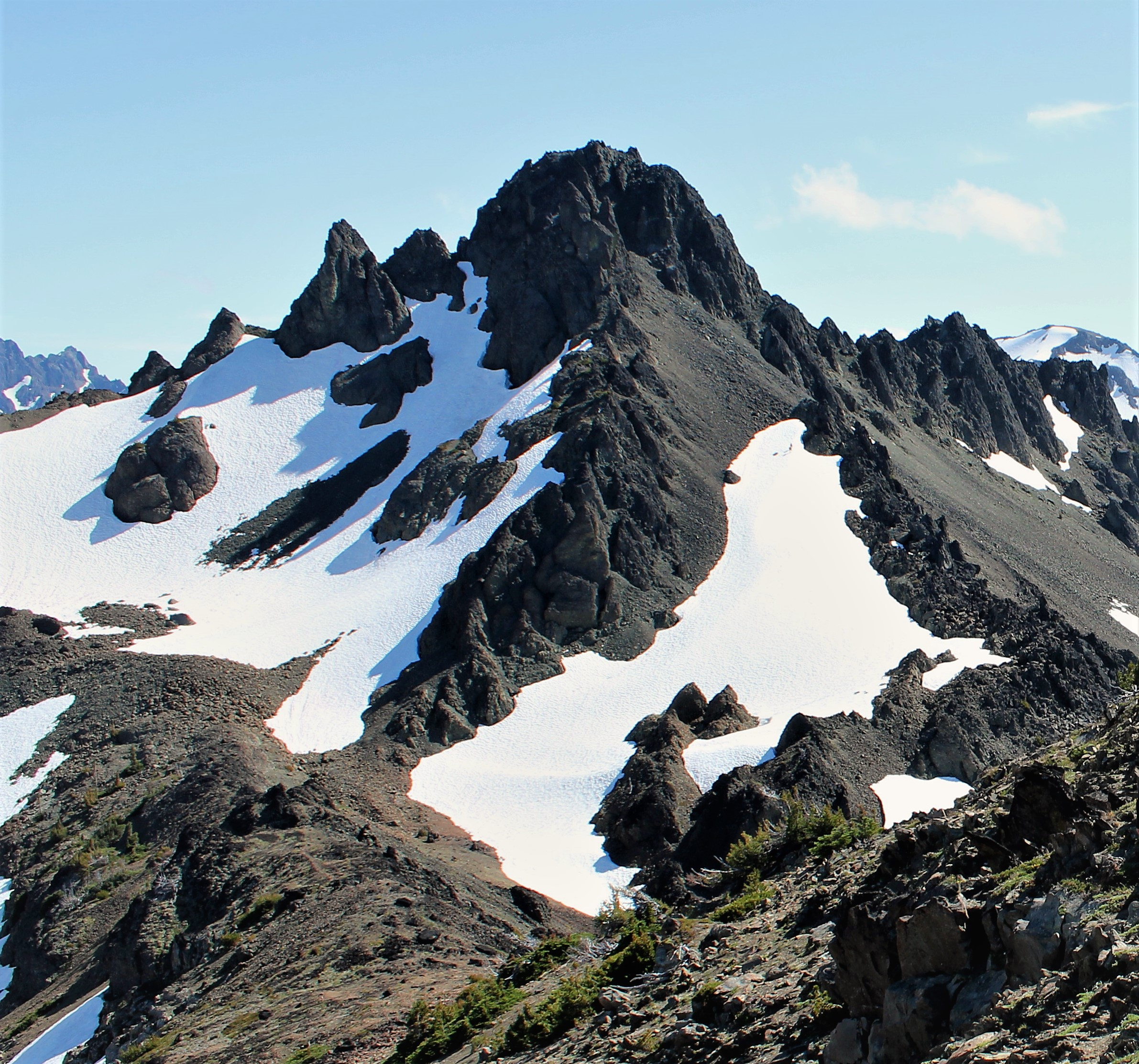
- North aspect

Highest point
- Elevation: 6,953 ft (2,119 m)
- Prominence: 433 ft (132 m)
- Isolation: 0.62 mi (1.00 km)
- Coordinates: 47°50′04″N 123°11′46″W

Geography
- Location within Washington (state) Location within the United States
- Country: United States
- State: Washington
- County: Jefferson
- Protected area: Olympic National Park; Buckhorn Wilderness
- Parent range: Olympic Mountains
- Topo map: USGS Mount Deception

Geology
- Rock age: Eocene

Climbing
- Easiest route: class 2 scrambling via Royal Lake

Petunia Peak is a 6,953-foot (2,119-metre) mountain summit located in Jefferson County of Washington state.

== Description ==
Petunia Peak is set in the northeastern Olympic Mountains, and is situated on the boundary shared by Olympic National Park with the Buckhorn Wilderness, on land partially managed by the Olympic National Forest. Precipitation runoff from Petunia Peak drains into tributaries of the Dungeness River, and topographic relief is significant as the east aspect rises 3,750 feet (1,143 m) above the river in approximately 1.7 mile, and the west aspect rises 2,000 feet above Royal Basin in less than one mile. Old-growth forests of Douglas fir, western hemlock, and western redcedar grow on the lower slopes surrounding the peak. Like the town of Sequim 17 miles to the north, Petunia Peak lies in the rain shadow of the Olympic Mountains. It is also called "Petunia Peaks", as a higher summit known as North Petunia Peak (6,998 ft) rises 0.6 mile (1 km) to the north. This landform's name has not been officially adopted by the U.S. Board on Geographic Names, so the mountain is not labeled on USGS maps.

== Climate ==
Petunia Peak is located in the marine west coast climate zone of western North America. Weather fronts originating in the Pacific Ocean travel northeast toward the Olympic Mountains. As fronts approach, they are forced upward by the peaks (orographic lift), causing them to drop their moisture in the form of rain or snow. As a result, the Olympics experience high precipitation, especially during the winter months in the form of snowfall. Because of maritime influence, snow tends to be wet and heavy, resulting in avalanche danger. During winter months weather is usually cloudy, but due to high pressure systems over the Pacific Ocean that intensify during summer months, there is often little or no cloud cover during the summer. The months July through September offer the most favorable weather for viewing or climbing this peak.

== Gallery ==
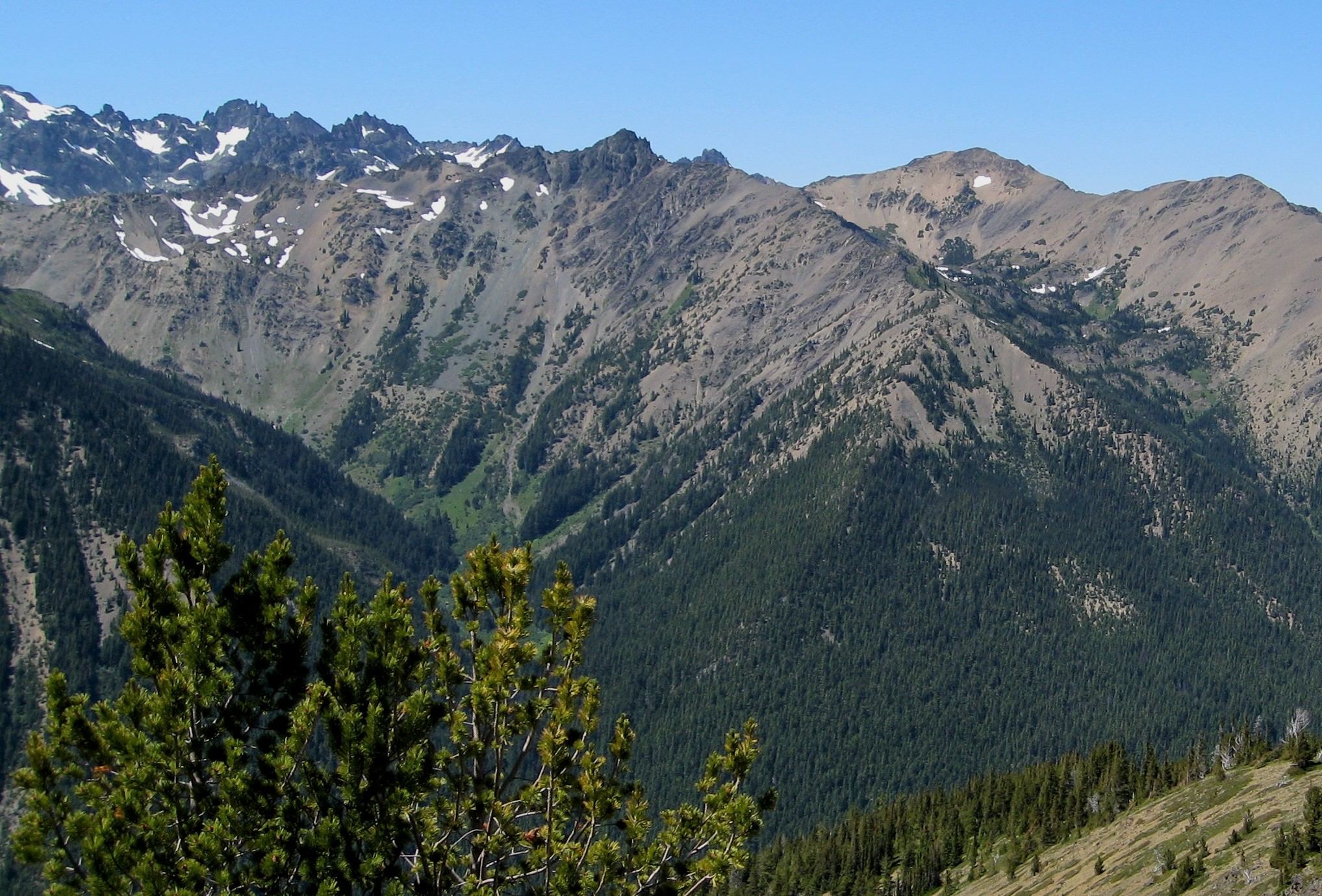
East aspect centered, from Marmot Pass. The Needles in upper left.

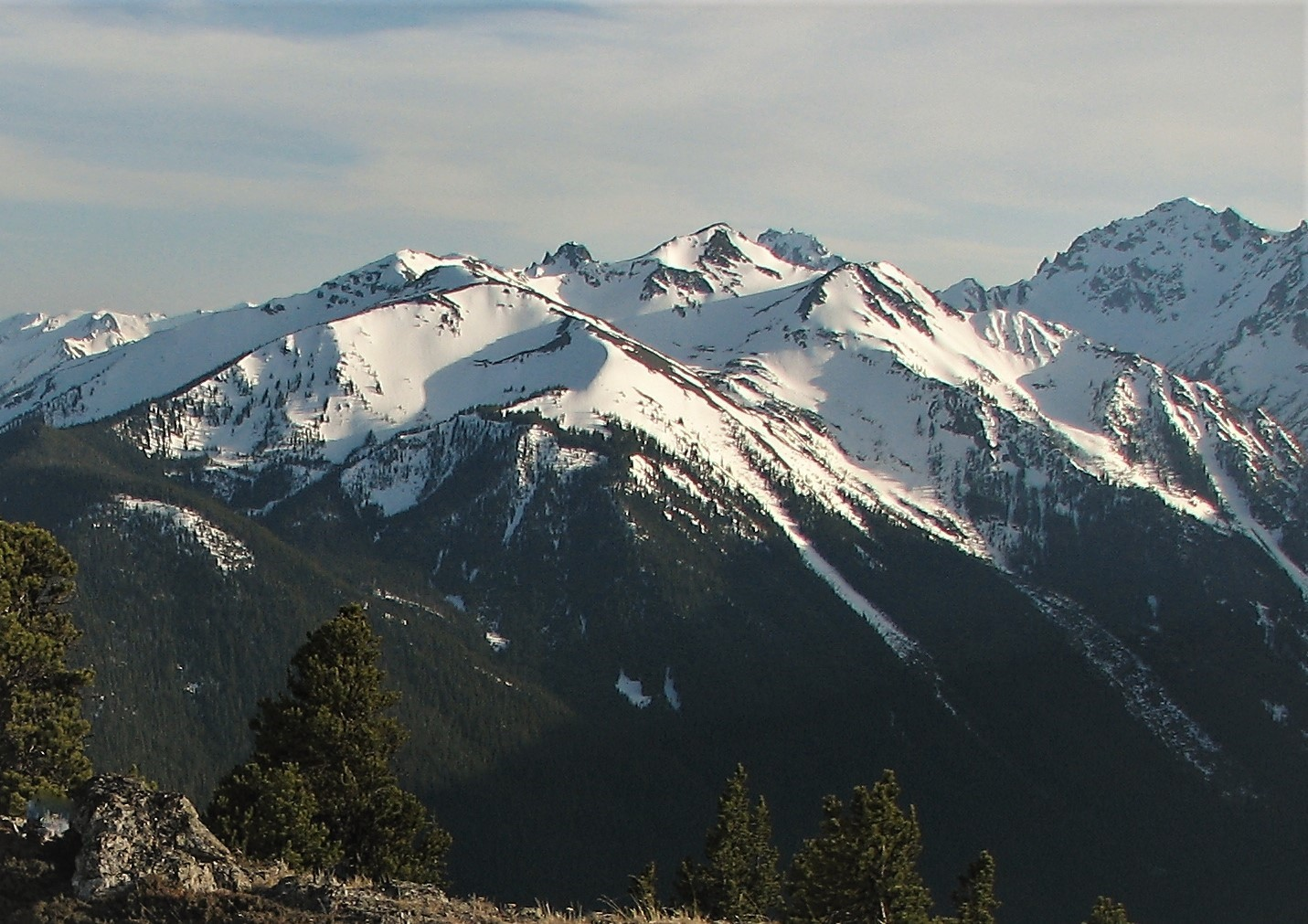
North Petunia Peak and Petunia Peak seen from north. Mt. Deception upper right.

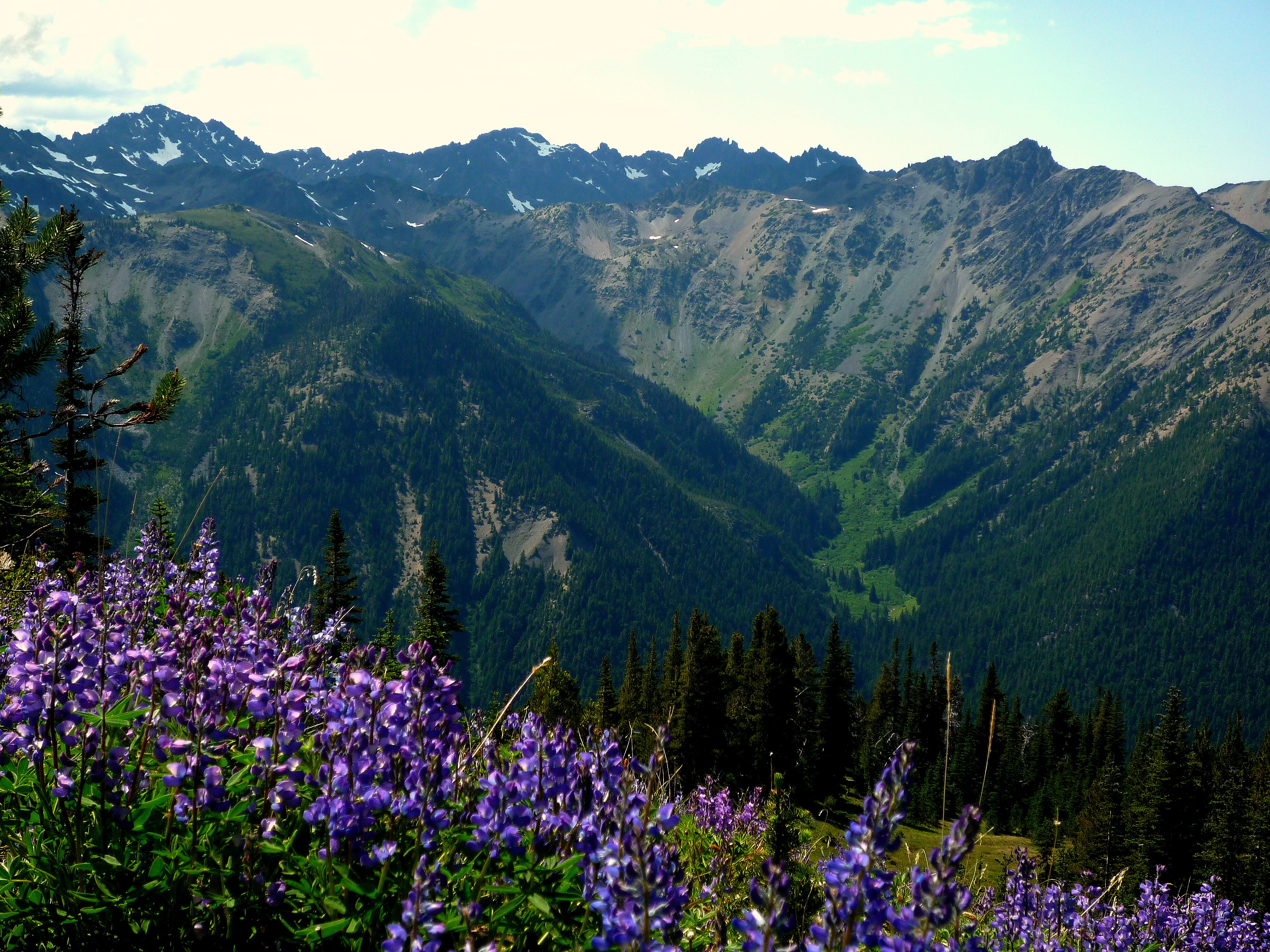
Petunia Peak (right) seen from east. Mt. Deception upper left corner.

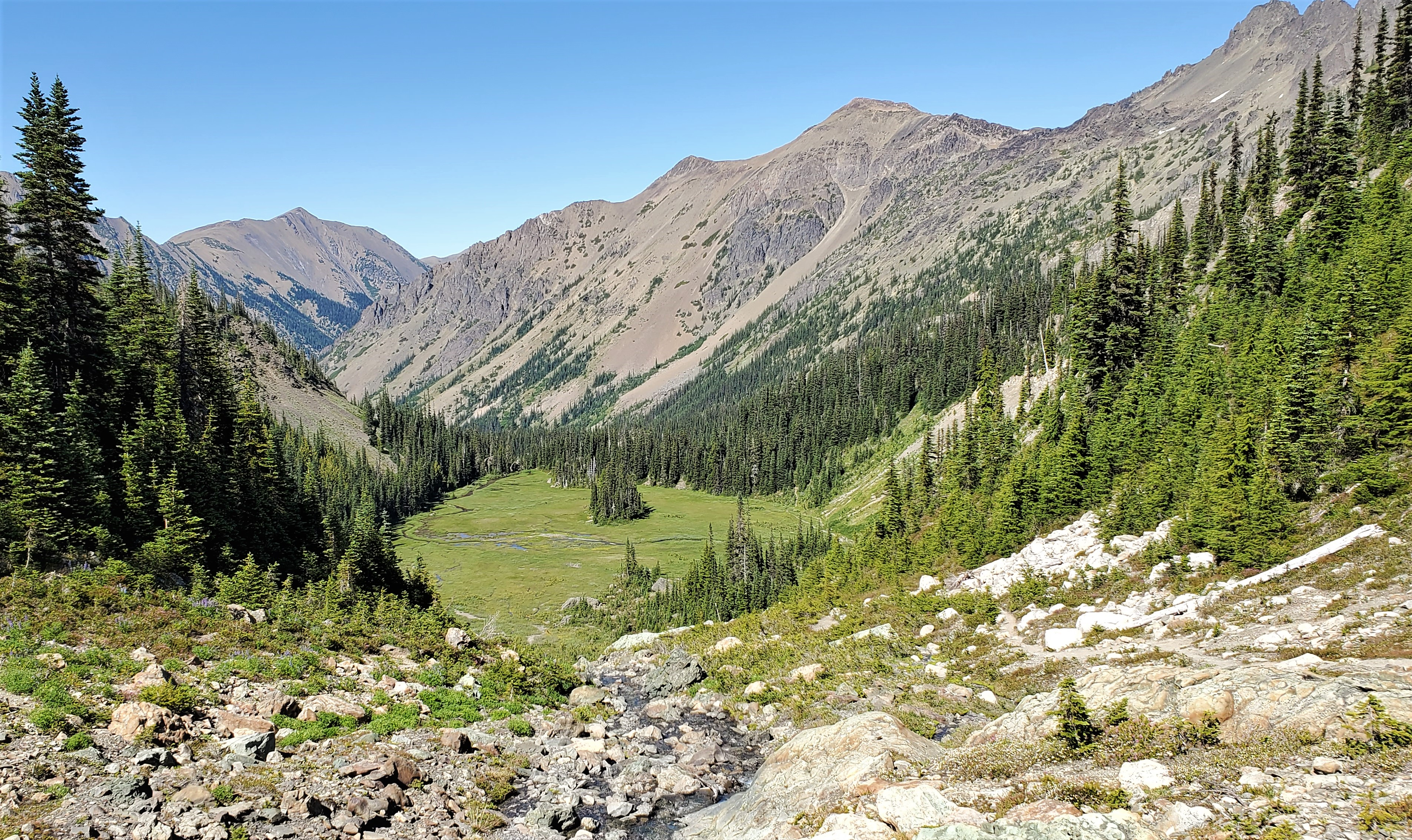
North Petunia Peak (right of center) seen from Royal Basin.
Petunia Peak in upper right corner of frame.

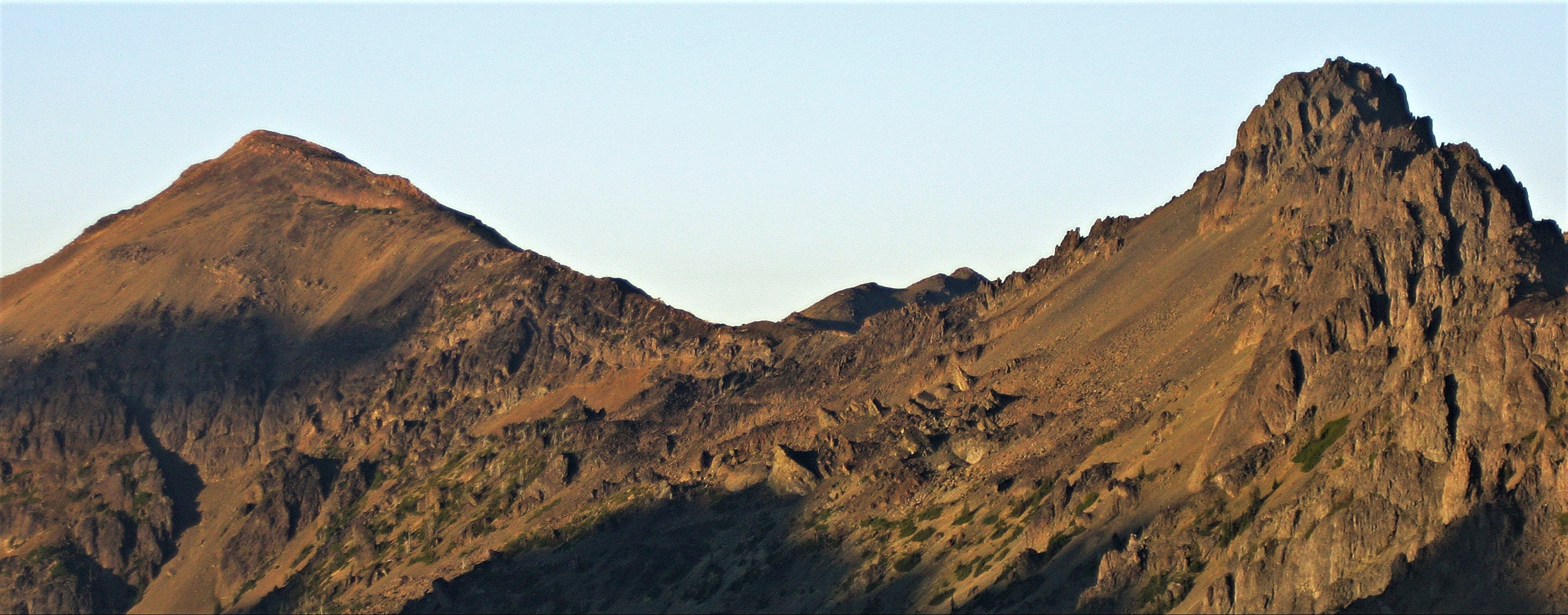
North Petunia Peak (left) and Petunia Peak

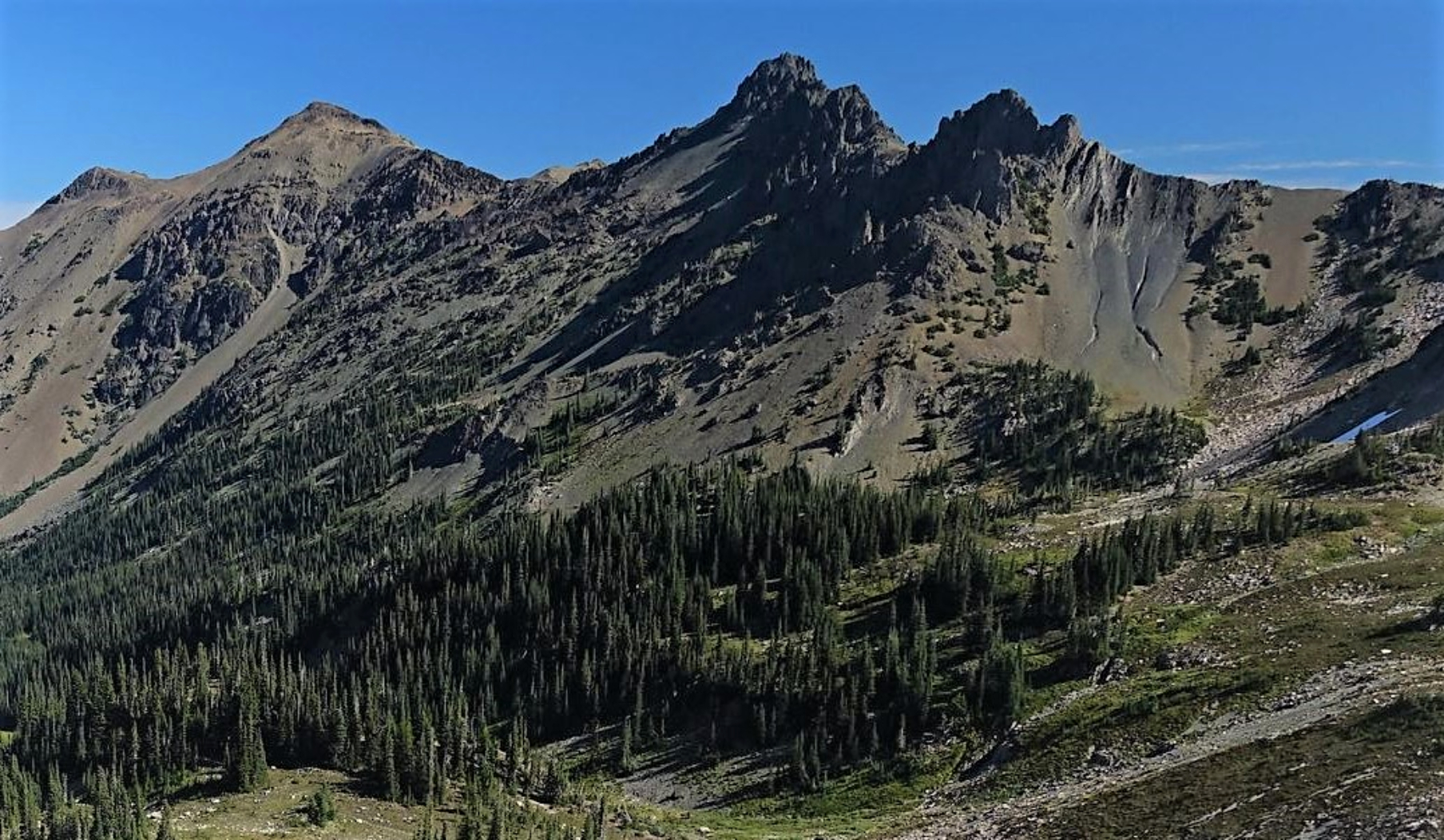
Southwest aspect

== See also ==
- Geology of the Pacific Northwest
