= Laki Niu =

Tongan judge

Laki Niu is a Tongan judge and former Member of the Legislative Assembly of Tonga. He was the first Tongan to sit on the Supreme Court of Tonga in over a hundred years.

Niu is a lawyer and was educated at the University of Auckland in New Zealand. In 1986 he challenged the government in court over improper parliamentary proceedings, and was subsequently elected as a People's Representative for Tongatapu in the 1987 Tongan general election. He was re-elected in 1990, but lost his seat in 1993 after splitting with ʻAkilisi Pōhiva over the formalisation of the Human Rights and Democracy Movement into a political party. and the type of democracy it advocated. He subsequently served as President of the Tongan Law Society and remained as President each successive year until 2017 when he resigned. Niu was the longest serving President of the Tonga Law Society. In that role, he was an advocate for an independent judiciary and opposed corporal punishment and the death penalty.

In June 2018 Niu was appointed to the Supreme Court. His contract ended on 30 June 2022, and he was replaced by Petunia Tupou. Following his departure journalist Kalafi Moala alleged that Niu's contract had initially been extended for another two years before abruptly being cancelled.
