= Neil Adsett =

Australian lawyer

Attorney General of Tonga
- In office 16 January 2012 – 26 June 2014
- Prime Minister: Sialeʻataongo Tuʻivakanō
- Preceded by: Barrie Sweetman (acting)
- Succeeded by: ʻAminiasi Kefu (acting)

Neil Adsett SC is an Australian lawyer. He served as Attorney General of Tonga from 2012 to 2014.

Adsett is from Australia and works as a law consultant, specialising in revising national statutes. He has produced revisions of the laws of Fiji, Tonga, Tuvalu, and other countries.

In 2008 he worked as Tonga's Law Revision Commissioner. He was subsequently appointed as Tonga's first anti-corruption commissioner. In January 2012 he was appointed as Attorney General. Shortly afterwards he was appointed Senior counsel. He resigned in June 2014, as it was "the right time now for a Tongan lawyer to take over".
