= Sitenimoa Valevale =

Tongan noble and politician

Lord Nuku
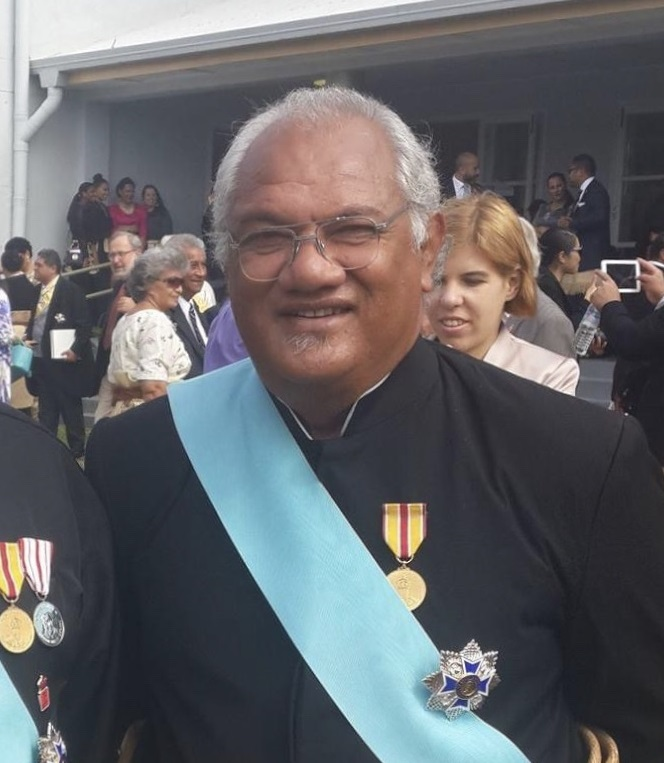
- Lord Nuku in 2015

Minister of Police, Prison and Fire Services
- In office 10 October 2019 – 28 December 2021
- Prime Minister: Pōhiva Tuʻiʻonetoa
- Preceded by: Mateni Tapueluelu
- Succeeded by: Siaosi Sovaleni
- In office 2005 – 17 May 2006
- Prime Minister: ʻAhoʻeitu ʻUnuakiʻotonga Tukuʻaho; Feleti Sevele
- Succeeded by: Siaosi Taimani 'Aho

Minister of Works
- In office 17 May 2006 – 26 November 2010
- Prime Minister: Feleti Sevele
- Preceded by: Sialeʻataongo Tuʻivakanō
- Succeeded by: Samiu Vaipulu

Member of the Tongan Parliament for ʻEua (noble)
- In office 2 August 2012 – 20 November 2025
- Preceded by: Havea Hikuleʻo ʻoPulotu
- Succeeded by: Lord Ve'ehala

Sitenimoa Valevale, styled Lord Nuku, is a Tongan noble, politician, and former Cabinet Minister. He represented the ʻEua noble constituency in the Legislative Assembly.

== Political career ==
Lord Nuku was appointed to Cabinet as Minister of Police, Prison and Fire Services in 2005, forcing him to resign his seat in the Legislative Assembly and causing a by-election. In May 2006 he was appointed Minister of Works in a cabinet reshuffle. Following political reforms requiring Cabinet Ministers to be members of the Legislative Assembly, he stood in the 2010 election but failed to secure a seat.

In May 2012, Nuku joined then-Deputy Prime Minister Samiu Vaipulu in suing opposition leader ʻAkilisi Pōhiva and two journalists for defamation over an article alleging that while Minister of Works he had profited from a US$46 million loan intended for road maintenance.

Also in 2012, Nuku was elected as a noble representative in a by-election following the conviction of former Speaker Havea Hikuleʻo ʻoPulotu. He was re-elected at the 2014 and 2017 elections. During his time in the Legislative Assembly, he has advocated for better tsunami evacuation plans, and supported subsidies for school fees in the wake of Cyclone Gita.

In February 2019, Nuku presented a petition from Tonga's nobles calling for the government to be investigated and parliament to be dissolved. In March 2019 he led a walkout of nobles and non-government MPs from parliament.

Following Prime Minister ʻAkilisi Pōhiva's death in 2019, Nuku was appointed to the Cabinet of Pōhiva Tuʻiʻonetoa as Minister for Police, Fire & Emergency Services. He was re-elected at the 2021 election, but was not reappointed to Cabinet. Nuku initially contested the 2025 general election as a candidate for the Tongatapu and ‘Eua constituencies. However, he was disqualified two days before the election due to unresolved legal proceedings against him.

== Controversy ==
In May 2017 the Land Court of Tonga ordered Valevale and Yanjian Group to pay Lord Luani TP$5,556,000 as compensation for illegally trespassing and mining Luani's land. The penalty was later reduced to TP$3 million. In October 2020 as part of litigation over the debt, Tonga's Chief Justice ruled that Valevale's evidence was unreliable, and that he had refused to cooperate with the court and tried to hide his financial status.

== Honours ==
National honours

- Order of Queen Sālote Tupou III, Grand Cross (31 July 2008).
