= Lord Chancellor of Tonga =

- Coat of arms
- Incumbent; Tavake Barron Afeaki since 4 February 2020
- Style: Excellency
- Member of: Privy Council of Tonga
- Appointer: King of Tonga
- Formation: 2010
- First holder: Harry Waalkens

The Lord Chancellor is a prominent and influential office in the Kingdom of Tonga. It was established in 2010 by King George Tupou V as part of an initiative to reform the judiciary. The new position was given the new powers to appoint judges from the Judicial Services Commission, which the King disbanded. The lord chancellor also has authority to investigate complaints against judges, a responsibility that previously rested with the Judicial Services Commission.

The Lord Chancellor is appointed by the King on the advice of the Judicial Appointments and Discipline Panel, of which the Lord Chancellor serves as chairman. The role carries primary responsibility for administering the courts, ensuring the independence of the judiciary, upholding the rule of law, and overseeing related constitutional matters. The Lord Chancellor operates independently, free from external influence, and may issue regulations on matters such as judicial retirement ages, pension schemes, and administrative functions.

== List of lord chancellors ==
- Harry Waalkens (30 August 2011 - 4 February 2020)
- Tavake Barron Afeaki (4 February 2020 - present)

== See also ==
- Lord Chancellor
