= Aunt Petunia =

Aunt Petunia can refer to:

- The Thing's aunt Petunia Grimm from Marvel Comics
- Harry Potter's aunt Petunia Dursley
- The puppet in Meet the Robinsons
