= Tony Ford (judge) =

New Zealand lawyer, jurist (1942–2020)

Tony Ford QSO
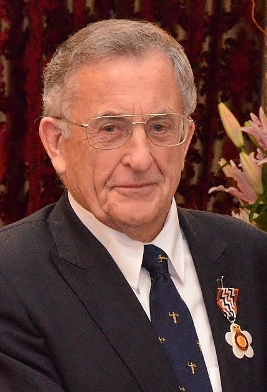
- Ford in 2015

Chief Justice of Tonga
- In office September 2006 – September 2010
- Preceded by: Robin Maclean Webster
- Succeeded by: Michael Dishington Scott

Personal details
- Born: Anthony David Ford; 8 May 1942 Hokitika, New Zealand
- Died: 31 January 2020 (aged 77)
- Education: University of Auckland
- Occupation: Lawyer; jurist

Anthony David Ford QSO (1942 – 31 January 2020) was a New Zealand lawyer and jurist. He served as a judge of the Employment Court of New Zealand and Chief Justice of the Kingdom of Tonga.

== Biography ==
Ford was born on 8 May 1942 in Hokitika on the West Coast of the South Island, and was educated at Hari Hari Primary School, St Bede's College in Christchurch and the University of Auckland.

Between 1963 and 1967, he worked in the legal section of the Department of Maori Affairs in Auckland. In 1970, he was admitted to the bar in Auckland and in July the same year he joined the law firm Bell Gully in Wellington. He specialised initially in personal injury work and then in employment law, commercial litigation and defamation cases. Ford was a partner in Bell Gully between 1974 and 2000. He was a life member of the New Zealand Sporting Clubs' Association (SCANZ) and of the New Zealand Licensing Trusts Association, and a former trustee of the Halberg Trust.

In July 2000, Ford was appointed a judge of the Supreme Court of Tonga. From 2005 to 2007, he also served as a judge on the Fijian Court of Appeal. In September 2006, Ford was appointed Chief Justice of the Kingdom of Tonga and President of the Tonga Court of Appeal. In those capacities he carried out significant reforms of the Kingdom’s judicial system and in June 2008 he received international recognition for his work when he was invited to travel to New York to be presented with the World Bank’s Reformer of the Year award on behalf of the Tongan judiciary.

In November 2007, Ford was Convenor of the 17th Biennial Pacific Judicial Conference in Nuku’alofa which was attended by over 50 judges from around the Pacific, including 21 chief justices. In August 2008, Ford was made a Knight Commander of the Order of Queen Sālote Tupou III by the King of Tonga, George Tupou V.

On 25 March 2010, Ford was appointed to the position of judge of the Employment Court of New Zealand, although he did not take up that position until the expiration of his Tongan contract in September 2010.

In the 2015 New Year Honours, Ford was appointed a Companion of the Queen's Service Order, for services to Tonga and the judiciary.

Ford was married to Valda and they had seven children. He died on 31 January 2020.
