= Supreme Court of Tonga =

Highest court in the Kingdom of Tonga

The Supreme Court of Tonga is the superior court in Tonga. It hears criminal and civil cases and acts as an appellate court for Tonga's inferior courts, the Magistrates' Courts.

== Jurisdiction ==
The Supreme Court can hear appeals as of right from any judgment or decision of the Magistrates' Courts.

The Supreme Court has original jurisdiction to try civil matters when the amount in dispute exceeds T$500 and in all matters of divorce, probate and admiralty. It can try any criminal offence that is indictable as well as summary conviction offences that carry a maximum penalty more than T$500 and/or two years' imprisonment. The Supreme Court cannot hear appeals from the Land Court.

Appeals from decisions of the Supreme Court may be heard by the Court of Appeal, which is the final court of appeal.

== Structure ==
The Supreme Court is headed by the Lord Chief Justice of the Supreme Court; there are currently four active Supreme Courts in Tongatapu. The judges go on circuit to the other islands twice during the year. All Justices are appointed by the Monarch; they are usually foreign nationals from Commonwealth jurisdictions. Supreme Court Justices are appointed for two-year terms, which are renewable. The Lord Chief Justice is appointed for a 4 year term.

In 2018, Laki Niu became the first Tongan to be a member of the Court in over a hundred years. In September 2020, 'Elisapeti Langi made history by becoming the first female member of the Judiciary in Tonga. In July 2022 Petunia Tupou became the first woman permanently appointed.

As of May 2026 the members of the court are:

- Lord Chief Justice Hon. Malcolm Bishop KC
- Justice Petunia Tupou
- Justice Nicholas Cooper
- Justice Paul Garlick KC
- Justice Edward Targowski KC
