= Court of Appeal of Tonga =

- Established: 1875
- Jurisdiction: Tonga
- Location: Nuku'alofa, Tonga
- Composition method: Royal nomination with Privy Council of Tonga approval
- Authorised by: Constitution of Tonga
- Appeals to: Privy Council of Tonga

Chief Justice of Tonga
- Currently: The Hon Malcolm Bishop KC
- Since: 2 September 2019

The Court of Appeal of Tonga is the supreme court in Tonga for all criminal and most civil matters. It hears criminal and civil appeals from the Supreme Court and also hears appeals from the Land Court.

== Jurisdiction ==
An appeal from the Supreme Court to the Court of Appeal can be made as of by right unless it is a civil matter and the amount in dispute does not exceed T$1000. Orders made by consent, orders regarding costs, and interlocutory decisions also cannot be heard by the Court of Appeal without leave of the Court.

An appeal from the Land Court to the Court of Appeal can also be made as of by right. However, matters relating to the determination of hereditary estates and titles are appealed to the Privy Council of Tonga.

The Court of Appeal can also deliver advisory opinions when specifically requested to do so by the monarch, the Cabinet, or the Legislative Assembly.

== Structure ==
The Court of Appeal is headed by the Chief Justice of Tonga. The Chief Justice and the other Justices of Appeal are appointed by the Privy Council and are foreign nationals, usually from other Commonwealth jurisdictions.

== Chief Justices ==
- 2023–present Malcolm Bishop
- 2019–2023 Michael Hargreaves Whitten
- 2015–2019 Owen Paulsen
- 2010–2015 Michael Dishington Scott
- 2006–2010 Anthony David Ford
- 2004–2006 Robin Maclean Webster
- c.1998–2004 Sir Gordon Ward (2nd term) (Later Chief Justice of Turks and Caicos Islands, 2008}
- 1997–1998 Jack Lewis
- 1995–1997 Nigel Hampton
- 1992–1995 Sir Gordon Ward (1st term)
- 1988–1991 Geoffrey William Martin
- 1985-1988 ?
- 1983–1985 Giles Harwood
- 1976-1983 ?
- 1973-1976 Henry Stead Roberts
- 1970-1973 ?
- 1968-1970 Ronald Knox-Mawer (jointly with Nauru)
- 1956–1968 Sir Clifford Hammett (jointly with Fiji)
- 1954-1956 David Blair Hunter
- 1953-1954 ?
- 1949–1953 James Beveridge Thomson (jointly with Fiji) (later Chief Justice of the Federation of Malaya, 1957)
- 1948-1949 William Desmond Care
- 1947-1948 ?
- 1941-1947 John Brownlees
- 1938-1941 ?
- 1936–1938 William Hemming Stuart
- 1936–1938 Ragnar Hyne
- 1930–1935 Sir Charles Murray Murray-Aynsley
- 1925–1929 William Kenneth Horne
- 1917–1925 Sir Herbert Cecil Stronge
- 1915-1917 George Scott, Tasmanian lawyer, acting
- 1905–1915 Robert Lowis Skeen
