= Malcolm Bishop =

Welsh lawyer and translator

Malcolm Leslie Bishop KC (born 9 October 1944) is a Welsh lawyer and translator. He is the current Lord Chief Justice of Tonga.

Bishop was educated at Ruabon Grammar School and Regent's Park College, Oxford, of which he is now Honorary Standing Counsel. He was called to the Bar in 1968 and is now a Kings's Counsel.

He serves as a Deputy High Court Judge, Recorder of the Crown Court, Chairman of the Isle of Man Legal Services Commission, Bencher of the Inner Temple, and a member of the Family Law Bar Association Committee and he was formerly a member of the Bar Council.

He has also been a Prospective parliamentary candidate for the Labour Party, standing for Bath in February 1974 and October 1974.

As an advocate he has taken part in several notable criminal trials, including R v Carty, a gang-related shooting in Birmingham, R v Sivakumar, which was the longest murder trial ever heard at the Old Bailey, and R v Moinul Abedin, in which the defendant was convicted of plotting explosions.

Bishop is a Welsh-speaker and it was claimed that Rhodri Morgan, First Minister for Wales, had chosen him as his preferred candidate for the post of Counsel General to the National Assembly for Wales (now called Counsel General for Wales) in succession to Winston Roddick, QC, in 2004. Rhodri Morgan said that he did not know Bishop, had never met him, and had never even spoken to him. In his application for the job Bishop had submitted a reference from Derry Irvine, Baron Irvine of Lairg, who had recently stepped down as Lord High Chancellor of Great Britain.

Bishop has worked on translating several gospels from Greek, including St. John's Gospel, the Book of Revelation, and the Gospel of Mark.

On 1 September 2024, he became the first openly gay Lord Chief Justice and President of the Land Court of the Kingdom of Tonga.

== Personal life ==
Bishop's partner of 51 years was Anthony Vander Woerd, a British businessman. Woerd was killed by armed robbers in the Turks and Caicos Islands in 2019.

== Sources ==
- Nations and Regions: The Dynamics of Devolution, Quarterly Monitoring Programme, Wales, Quarterly Report February 2004, p. 2
- Richard Norton-Taylor, 'Arrests point to radical new threat', The Guardian, 1 April 2004
- Morgan 'blocked' QC appointment, BBC, 4 March 2004
- 2 Paper Buildings The Chambers of Sir Desmond de Silva, QC
- Ruth Gledhill, 'An end to 'godliness' at Oxford', The Times, 19 September 2007, including a reply posted by Malcolm Bishop, QC on 22 September 2007
