= Privy Council of Tonga =

Supreme court

The Privy Council of Tonga is the highest ranking council to advise the Monarch in the Kingdom of Tonga. It is empowered to advise the King in his capacity as Head of State and Fountain of Justice under the provisions of Clause 50 (1) of the Constitution of Tonga:

Clause 50 (1): "The King shall appoint a Privy Council to provide him with advice. The Privy Council shall be composed of such people whom the King shall see fit to call to his Council."

== Membership ==
Members of the Privy Council of Tonga are appointed by the King of Tonga who is its chairman. The council has three types of members:

- Regular Members-these are the majority.
- Members who hold their position by virtue of an office they occupy
- The Law Lords

The Lord Chancellor, the Lord President of the Supreme Court and the Attorney General are automatically members of the Privy Council. The constitution does not set a limit on the number of members who sit on the council and this is left to the discretion of the Monarch.

== Judicial functions ==
The King in Privy Council has the authority to make appointments to most posts in the judicial branch of government. One of the primary goals of the constitutional reforms of 2010 was to ensure the separation of the executive, legislative and judicial branches of government. A significant result of these reforms and constitutional amendments was the removal of the King from the executive power. Executive power was transferred to the cabinet.

The drafters of the 2010 constitutional amendments did not want the executive government to control or interfere in the exercise of judicial power. They chose to vest the power to make these appointment in the office of the constitutional and non-partisan head of state, who is the Tongan monarch.

These include:

- The Lord Chancellor
- The Lord President of the Court of Appeal
- The Judges of the Court of Appeal
- The Lord Chief Justice of the Supreme Court
- The Judges of the Supreme Court
- The Lord President of the Land Court
- The Judges of the Land Court
- The Magistrates of local jurisdiction.

The council also contains a Judicial Committee, composed of the Lord Chancellor, The Attorney General, the Lord Chief Justice and five Law Lords, and called the Judicial Appointments and Discipline Panel. The Judicial Committee advise[s] the King on the exercise of his judicial powers and "investigate[s] complaints against judges.

The Judicial Committee of the Privy Council in London is the model upon which the Judicial Committee of the Privy Council of Tonga is based upon.

The King in Privy Council is the final court of appeal for cases dealing with hereditary estates and titles.

== Legislative functions ==
The Privy Council is empowered to issue orders in council to regulate the internal functions and operations of the council. Outside of these regulations the council has no legislative power in accordance with the democratic reforms of the constitution in 2010. According to the New York Times it is currently legislating the case of John Hosey-Rao
