= Orders, decorations, and medals of Tonga =

This page refers to the orders, decorations, and medals of Tonga. According to the country's constitution (article 44), the ruling monarch confers titles and decorations.

== Royal Orders ==
Below are the honours shown that are awarded by the Kingdom of Tonga, presented in order of precedence:

The Royal Order of Pouono (Ko e Fakalangilangi 'o Pouono) – Inactive order since 2008

Established about 1893 in a single class: Knight Grand Cross (KGCP)

The Royal Order of King George Tupou I (Ko e Fakalangilangi 'o Kingi Sia'osi Tupou I) – Dormant order

Established between 1875 – 1890 in 3 classes: Knight Grand Cross, Knight Commander, and Companion. Re-organised in 2008 into a single class: Knight Grand Cross (KGCGT)

The Royal Order of the Crown of Tonga (Ko e Fakalangilangi 'o Kalauni 'o Tonga)

Established 6 April 1913, re-organised 31 July 2008 in 4 classes: Knight Grand Cross (KGCCT), Grand Cross (GCCT), Commander (CCT), and Member (MCT)

The Most Illustrious Order of Queen Salote Tupou III (Ko e Fakalangilangi 'o Ma'olunga 'o Kuini Salote Tupou III)

Established 28 June 2008, in 4 classes: Knight Grand Cross (KGQS), Grand Cross (GCQS), Commander (CQS), and Member (MQS)

The Royal Military Order of St. George (Ko e Fakalangilangi Fakakaukau 'o Sa Sia'osi)

Established 2009 in 5 classes: Grand Cross (GCStG), Grand Officer (GOStG), Commander (CStG), Officer (OStG), Member (MStG) and 3 Associated Medals (gold, silver and bronze)

The Royal Order of the Phoenix (Ko e Fakalangilangi 'o e Finiki)

Established 2010 in a single class: Grand Cross (GCOP)

The King George Tupou V Royal Family Order (Ko e Fakalangilangi Fale 'Alo 'o Kingi Sia'osi Tupou V)

Established 2008 for royal ladies with one single class: Member (RFO)

The Most Devoted Royal Household Order of Tonga (Ko e Fakalangilangi Fale 'Alo)

Established 2009 in 5 classes: Grand Cross (GCRH), Grand Officer (GORH), Commander (CRH), Officer (ORH), Member (MRH) and 3 Associated Medals (RHM) in gold, silver and bronze

The Royal Order of Oceania (Ko e Fakalangilangi 'o 'Ousenia)
Established 2011 with one single class: Grand Cross

== See also ==
- Tongan nobles
