= 1963 Tongan general election =

General elections were held in Tonga on 27 May 1963.

== Electoral system ==
The Legislative Assembly had seven directly-elected members; three representing Tongatapu and nearby islands, two representing Haʻapai and two representing Vavaʻu and nearby islands. A further seven members were elected by the nobility based on the same constituencies, seven ministers (including the governors of Haʻapai and Vavaʻu) and a Speaker chosen by the monarch, Sālote Tupou III.

== Results ==
Constituency	Elected members
Commoners
Haʻapai	Pousima 'Afeaki
Haʻapai	Latunipulu 'Unga
Tongatapu	Molitoni Finau
Tongatapu	Tu'ilatai Mataele
Tongatapu	Sekonaia Tu'akoi
Vavaʻu	S. Fakalata
Vavaʻu	Lataipouono Niusini
Nobles
Haʻapai	Tuita
Haʻapai	Tu'iha'ateiho
Tongatapu	Fielakepa
Tongatapu	Semisi Fonua
Tongatapu	Ma'afu
Vavaʻu	Talolakepa Fulivai
Vavaʻu	Tongaleva Luani
Source: Colonial Office
