= Tuita =

Tuita is a surname. Notable people with the surname include:

- Hefa Leone Tuita (born 1991), American dancer
- Lolesio Tuita (1943–1994), French javelin thrower
- Telly Tuita (born 1980), Australian and New Zealand artist
- Siosaia Aleamotuʻa Laufilitonga Tuita (1920-1998), Tongan royal, Lord Tuita
- Siosa'ia Ma'ulupekotofa Tuita (born 1951), Tongan royal, Lord Tuita
- Salote Mafileʻo Pilolevu Tuita (born 1951), Tongan royal
