= 1948 Tongan general election =

General elections were held in Tonga in May 1948.

== Electoral system ==
The Legislative Assembly had seven directly-elected members; three representing Tongatapu and nearby islands, two representing Haʻapai and two representing Vavaʻu and nearby islands. A further seven members were elected by the nobility, seven ministers (including the governors of Haʻapai and Vavaʻu) and a Speaker chosen by the monarch, Sālote Tupou III.

A new electoral law introduced in 1947 required candidates to be nominated by at least 30 voters and introduced an election deposit of £5, which would be lost if a candidate received less than 20% of the vote.

== Campaign ==
A total of 29 candidates contested the seven directly-elected seats; twelve in Vavaʻu, ten in Tongatapu and seven in Haʻapai.

== Results ==
Molitoni Finau was elected as the most-voted for candidate in Tongatapu.

Constituency	Elected members	Notes
Haʻapai	V.L. Tu'akihekolo	
Haʻapai	P. Vi	Re-elected
Tongatapu	Molitoni Finau	Re-elected
Tongatapu	S. Lino	Re-elected
Tongatapu	Harry Percival Vete	
Vavaʻu	P. Afuha'amango	
Vavaʻu	Viliami Molofaha	Re-elected
Source: Pacific Islands Monthly
