= 1954 Tongan general election =

General elections were held in Tonga on 28 May 1954. An amended electoral law had been passed in 1951 to allow women to vote for the first time in the elections; however, a technical error in the legislation was discovered that meant the franchise could not be extended in time to take effect for the 1954 elections.

== Electoral system ==
The Legislative Assembly had seven directly-elected members; three representing Tongatapu and nearby islands, two representing Haʻapai and two representing Vavaʻu and nearby islands. A further seven members were elected by the nobility based on the same constituencies, seven ministers (including the governors of Haʻapai and Vavaʻu) and a Speaker chosen by the monarch, Sālote Tupou III.

== Results ==
Constituency	Elected members	Notes
Commoners
Haʻapai	Pousima 'Afeaki	
Haʻapai	V.L. Tu'akihekolo	Re-elected
Tongatapu	Molitoni Finau	Re-elected
Tongatapu	Sekonaia Tu'akoi	Re-elected
Tongatapu	Harry Percival Vete	
Vavaʻu	Samisoni Puliuvea Afuha'amango	Re-elected
Vavaʻu	T. Mafua	Re-elected
Nobles
Haʻapai	Tu'iha'angana	Re-elected
Haʻapai	Tuita	Re-elected
Tongatapu	Fusitu'a	
Tongatapu	Semisi Fonua	Re-elected
Tongatapu	Lavaka	
Vavaʻu	Tu'ilakepa	
Vavaʻu	Veikune	Re-elected
Source: Pacific Islands Monthly
