= Lord Luani =

Lord Luani is one of the 34 noble titles in Tonga. It may refer to:

- Tongaleva Luani, holder of the title until his death in 1987
- Sione Laumanuʻuli Luani (1959–2010), holder of the title between 1987 and his death in 2010
