= 1951 Tongan general election =

General elections were held in Tonga in 1951

== Electoral system ==
The Legislative Assembly had seven directly elected members; three representing Tongatapu and nearby islands, two representing Haʻapai and two representing Vavaʻu and nearby islands. A further seven members were elected by the nobility based on the same constituencies, seven ministers (including the governors of Haʻapai and Vavaʻu) and a Speaker chosen by the monarch, Sālote Tupou III.

== Results ==
Elected members included the commoners Molitoni Finau and Sekonaia Tu'akoi and the noble Semisi Fonua from Tongatapu.
