= Tu'i'afitu =

Tu'i'afitu is a surname. Notable people with the surname include:

- Samisoni Fonomanu Tu'i'afitu (1933–2005), Tongan nobleman
- Tonga Tuʻiʻafitu (born 1962), Tongan nobleman
