= Viliami =

Viliami is a given name. Notable people with the given name include:

- Viliami Fehoko (born 1999), American football player
- Viliami Fifita (born 2001), Australian rugby league player
- Viliami Fine (born 1997), Tongan rugby union player
- Viliami Hakalo (born 1987), Tongan rugby union player
- Viliami Hingano (1975–2022), Tongan politician
- Viliami Latu, Tongan politician
- Viliami Lolohea (born 1993), New Zealand rugby union player
- Viliami Lutua (born c. 1956), Tongan rugby union player
- Viliami Ma'afu (born 1982), Tongan rugby union player
- Viliami Maʻasi (born 1975), Tongan rugby union player
- Viliami Tungī Mailefihi (1888–1941), Tongan high chieftain
- Viliami Moala (1993–2023), American football player
- Viliami Molofaha (died 1970), Tongan politician
- Viliami Napa'a, Tongan rugby union player
- Viliami Ofahengaue (born 1968), Tongan rugby league player
- Viliami Pulu (born 1960), Tongan boxer
- Viliami Tahitu'a (born 1992), Tongan rugby union player
- Viliami Tangi, Tongan politician
- Viliami Tapaatoutai (born 1972), Tongan weightlifter
- Viliami Taulani (born 1997), Tongan rugby union player
- Viliami Tolutaʻu (born 1951), Tongan sculptor
- Viliami Vailea (born 2002), Tongan rugby league player
- Viliami Vaki (born 1976), Tongan rugby union player
- Viliami Veasiʻi Veikune, Tongan noble
