= 1969 Tongan general election =

General elections were held in Tonga in May 1969.

== Electoral system ==
The Legislative Assembly had seven directly-elected members; three representing Tongatapu and nearby islands, two representing Haʻapai and two representing Vavaʻu and nearby islands. A further seven members were elected by the nobility based on the same constituencies, seven ministers (including the governors of Haʻapai and Vavaʻu) and a Speaker chosen by the monarch.

== Results ==
Three incumbent MPs (Pousima Afeaki and Lopeti Tofaimalaealoa of Haʻapai and Lopoi Tupou of Tongatapu) lost their seats.

Constituency	Elected members
Commoners
Haʻapai	Tevita Sale Taufa
Haʻapai	Latunipulu Unga
Tongatapu	Tuilatai Mataele
Tongatapu	Vili Ahio Vaipulu
Tongatapu	Sekonaia Tu'akoi
Vavaʻu	Lataipouono Niusini
Vavaʻu	Masao Paasi
Source: Pacific Islands Monthly

== Aftermath ==
The newly elected Legislative Assembly was opened by King Tāufaʻāhau Tupou IV on 19 June.
