= Order of the Phoenix =

Order of the Phoenix may refer to:

- Order of the Phoenix (Greece), a medal conferred on Greek or foreign citizens
- Royal Order of the Phoenix (Tonga), a knighthood order of the Kingdom of Tonga, founded in 2010
- Various uses related to the Harry Potter series
  - Harry Potter and the Order of the Phoenix, the fifth novel in the Harry Potter series by J. K. Rowling
  - Harry Potter and the Order of the Phoenix (film), a film based on the novel
  - Harry Potter and the Order of the Phoenix (soundtrack), the soundtrack to the film
  - Harry Potter and the Order of the Phoenix (video game), the video game based on the film and novel
  - Order of the Phoenix (fictional organisation), a fictional organisation in the Harry Potter series
- A secret organization of psychic rebels in Rebels of the Red Planet (1961) by Charles L. Fontenay

== See also ==
- "The Sect of the Phoenix", a short story by Jorge Luis Borges
