= David Fulivai =

Tongan politician (born 1977)

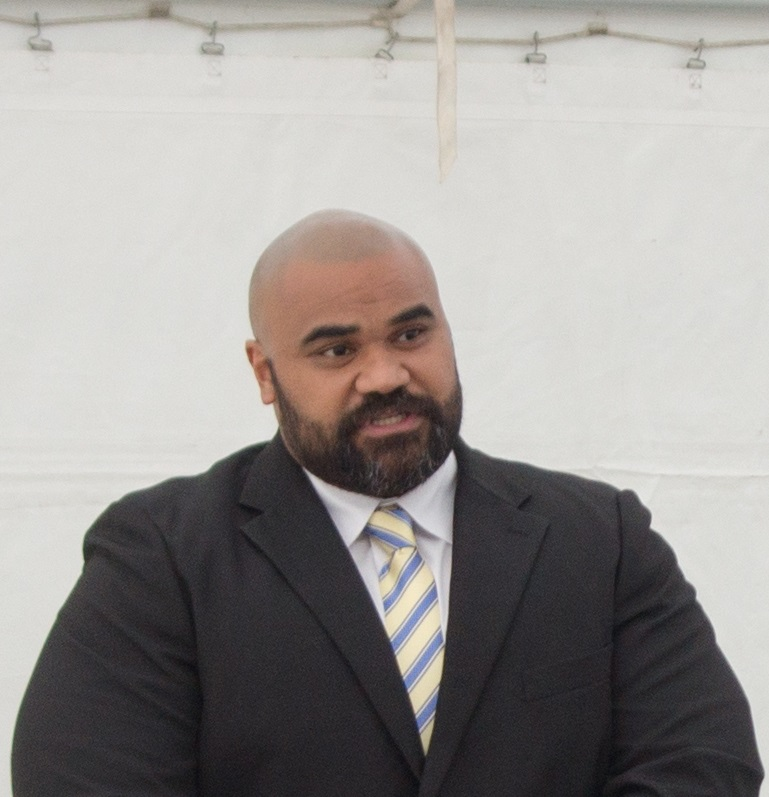
- Lord Fulivai in 2014

Governor of Vava'u
- In office 1 July 2011 – 2018
- Preceded by: Feleti Sevele
- Succeeded by: Lord Fakatulolo

Member of the Tongan Parliament for Vavaʻu Nobles' constituency
- In office 31 July 2009 – 25 November 2010
- Preceded by: Sione Laumanuʻuli Luani
- Succeeded by: Tonga Tuʻiʻafitu

Personal details
- Born: 1 December 1977 (age 48)

David Fulivai (styled Lord Fulivai) (born 1 December 1977) is a Tongan noble, politician, and former member of the Legislative Assembly of Tonga. He has previously served as Governor of Vava'u. He is the 10th Noble Fulivai since 2002.

He was elected to the Legislative Assembly in 2009 in a by-election following the appointment of Sione Laumanuʻuli Luani as Governor of Vava'u. When he elected, he became the youngest member of the Legislative Assembly. He lost his seat just over a year later at the 2010 Tongan general election. In July 2011 he was appointed Governor of Vava'u, becoming its youngest Governor.

In October 2021 the High Court of New Zealand ordered Fulivai and his wife to repay over $250,000 to a New Zealand businessman as part of a fraudulent land deal. New Zealand police subsequently charged him with obtaining by deception. In December 2021 the same businessman took action to recover a further $340,000 paid as part of a yellow fin tuna project.

Preceded by Feleti Sevele	Governor of Vava'u; 1 July 2011 – 2018	Succeeded by Lord Fakatulolo
