= 1981 Tongan general election =

General elections were held in Tonga on 1 May 1981. Seven nobles were elected by their peers, whilst a further seven People's Representatives were publicly elected.

== Results ==
Amid a record voter turnout, four of the seven incumbent People's Representatives were unseated. Haʻapai MP ‘Uliti Uata was beaten by Pousima Afeaki; Tongatapu representatives Tomiteau Finau and Papiloa Foliaki were defeated by Joe Tuʻilatai Mataele and Sitili Tupouniua; and Vavaʻu MP Palavilala Tapueluelu was defeated by Ula Afuhaʻamango.
