= George Tupou V =

King of Tonga from 2006 to 2012

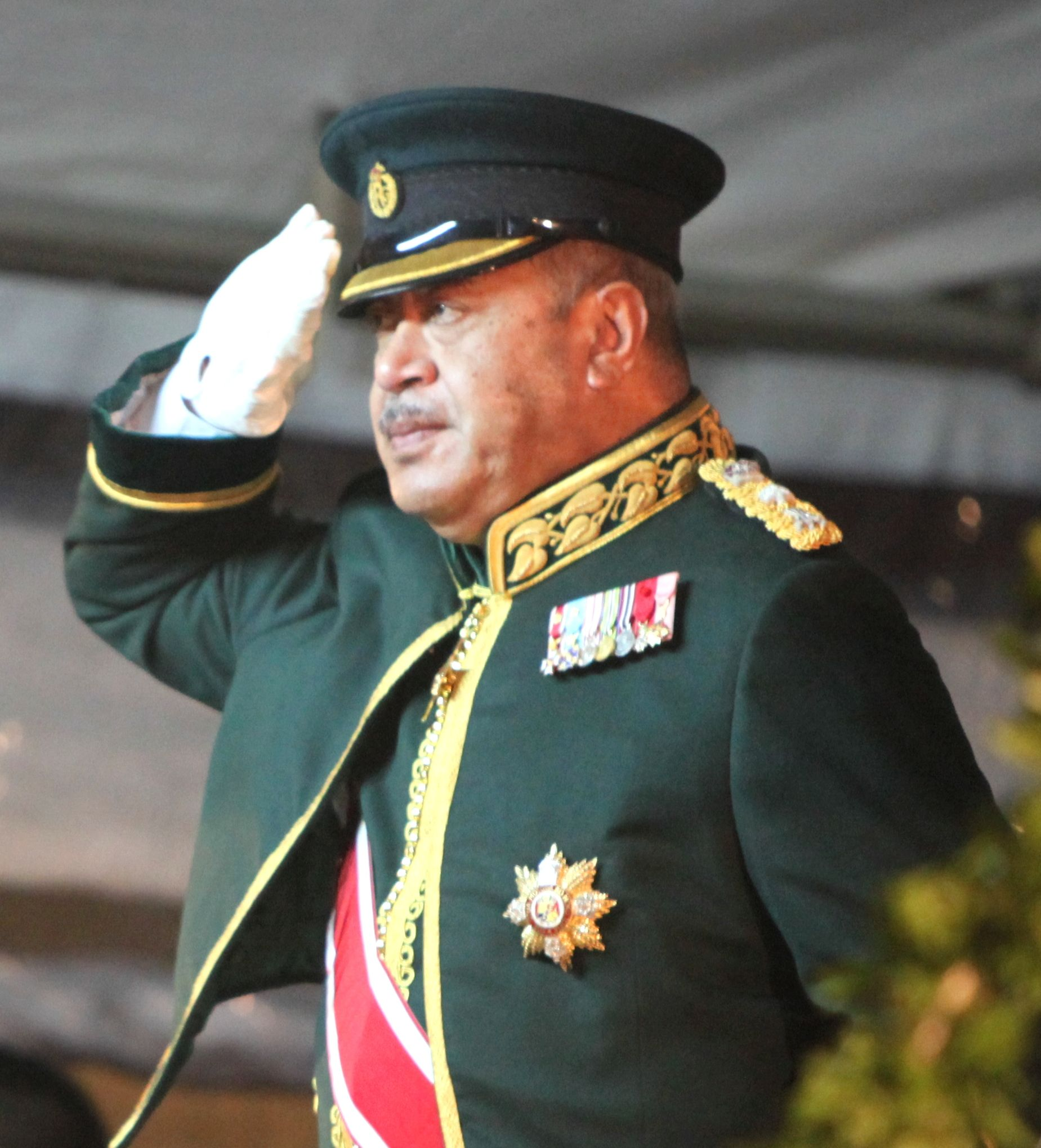
- Tupou in 2011

King of Tonga
- Reign: 11 September 2006 – 18 March 2012
- Coronation: 1 August 2008
- Predecessor: Tāufaʻāhau Tupou IV
- Successor: Tupou VI
- Prime Ministers: Feleti Sevele; Sialeʻataongo Tuʻivakanō
- Born: 4 May 1948; Tongatapu, Tonga
- Died: 18 March 2012 (aged 63); Queen Mary Hospital, Pok Fu Lam, Hong Kong
- Burial: Malaʻekula
- Issue: ʻIlima Lei Fifita Tohi
Names
- Siaosi Tāufaʻāhau Manumataongo Tukuʻaho
- House: Tupou
- Father: Tāufaʻāhau Tupou IV
- Mother: Halaevalu Mataʻaho ʻAhomeʻe
- Religion: Free Wesleyan Church

George Tupou V (Note: Tongan: Siaosi Tupou V) (Siaosi Tāufaʻāhau Manumataongo Tukuʻaho Tupou; 4 May 1948 – 18 March 2012) was King of Tonga from 2006 until his death in 2012. He was the eldest son of King Tāufaʻāhau Tupou IV.

After ascending the throne, George Tupou announced that he would relinquish most of the monarch's powers and be guided by the Prime Minister on most matters. A snap election in 2010 was the first to be called under the new system. Following his death, he was succeeded by his younger brother, Tupou VI. Having reigned for 5 years and 189 days, he was the shortest-reigning Tongan monarch since the declaration of the constitutional monarchy in 1875.

== Early life and education ==
Prince Siaosi was born on 4 May 1948, as the eldest child of Crown Prince Tupoutoʻa Tungī (later King Tāufaʻāhau Tupou IV) and his wife Crown Princess Halaevalu, during the reign of his grandmother Queen Sālote Tupou III.

He attended King's School and King's College, both in Auckland. This was followed by periods at The Leys School in Cambridge, and another school in Switzerland. He also studied at Oxford University and the Royal Military Academy Sandhurst in England. In addition to Tongan, he was fluent in English, French and German.

== Crown Prince ==
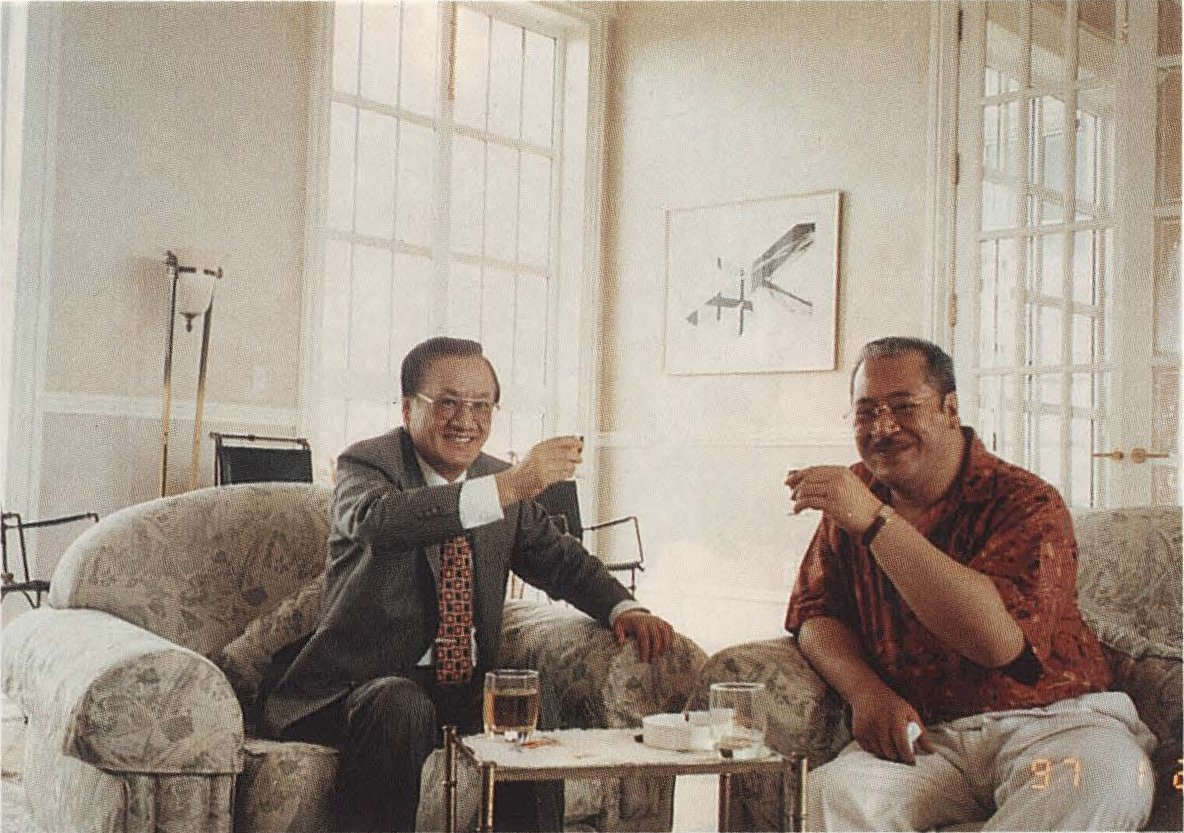
The then-Crown Prince Tupoutoʻa with the ambassador of Taiwan, 1997

After Siaosi's father ascended the throne in 1965, he was appointed Crown Prince of Tonga on 4 May 1966. In that role, he was better known by one of the traditional nobility titles, Tupoutoʻa, which has been normally reserved for crown princes since his father was given the title in 1935.

As Crown Prince, Tupoutoʻa held great influence in Tongan politics. He served as assistant secretary in the Ministry of Foreign Affairs in 1970 and as acting High Commissioner to the United Kingdom in 1975–76. From 1979 to 1998, he served in the cabinet as Minister of Foreign Affairs and Defence. He ultimately ended his political career to focus on business interests in Tonga, as his sister Princess Pilolevu already owned a geosynchronous satellite enterprise. Tupoutoʻa served as co-chairman of the Shoreline Group (Tonfön). In his spare time, he collected toy soldiers and visited Mongolia in 2001 to film a documentary. Some conservative elements of Tongan society considered him too progressive owing to his Western education and lifestyle.

A documentary dated June 2004 by Australian journalist Gillian Bradford identified some of the challenges facing Tongan society at the time but also showed that Tupoutoʻa was in favour of a gradual transition to more extensive democracy in Tonga. In an interview, he pointed out that free speech in Tonga was protected by the Constitution.

As his father became more ill, Tupoutoʻa and his sister began acting as regent in the absence of the king, who remained hospitalised in New Zealand.

== Reign ==
=== Accession and coronation ===
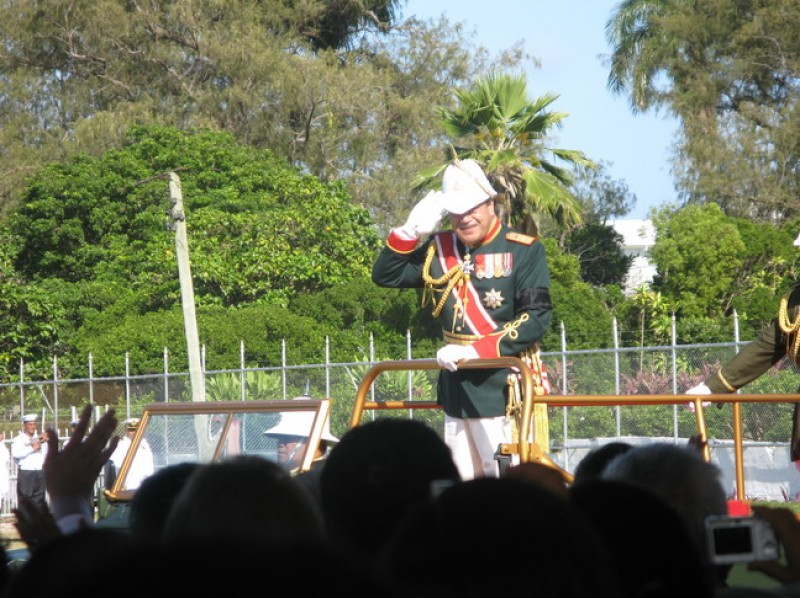
George Tupou V following his coronation, 2008

Following his father's death on 10 September 2006, he was sworn in as King George Tupou V, (Note: The previous king died in New Zealand, where the local time was 23:34 (10 September). The time in Tonga was an hour ahead, being 00:34 (11 September). The new king was sworn in on 11 September at midday.) which also made him, from a traditional viewpoint, the 23rd Tuʻi Kanokupolu (the overlords of Tongatapu). He was recognised as a descendant of the sky god Tangaroa.

The ceremonial aspects of Tupou V's accession took place in July and August 2008. These were initially to be held in 2007 after the six-month official mourning period for his father (as required of close relatives) and his own birthday. They were also deferred after the 2006 Nukuʻalofa riots as he decided to focus instead on reconstruction of the damaged capital.

During the week of celebrations, two key ceremonies took place to mark his coronation. On 30 July 2008, a Taumafa Kava (royal kava ring) ceremony was held on Malaʻe Pangai, the open space to the east of the Royal Palace. During the ceremony, the king sat on a pile of handwoven pandanus mats in an open pavilion facing the sea, while more than 200 Tongan nobles and chiefs dressed in woven skirts and sea shells circled him. He wore the traditional Tongan taʻovala (woven mat skirt) and a garland of flowers. The ceremony included his formal recognition as the Tuʻi Kanokupolu, and the rightful descendant of King George Tupou I, who united Tonga in the 19th century. The ceremony involved having kava, hundreds of baskets of food, and seventy cooked pigs presented to the King and the assembly of chiefs and nobles.

Later that night, schoolchildren held 30,000 torches to proclaim the coronation in what is known as a tupakapakanava. The traditional torch spectacle was held at a spot overlooking the Pacific and is an ancient honour reserved solely for the Tongan sovereign and Royal Family.

A second, European-style coronation ceremony took place on 1 August 2008 in the Centennial Chapel, Nukuʻalofa. Anglican Archbishop of Polynesia Jabez Bryce invested George Tupou V with the Tongan regalia: the ring, sceptre and sword. During the culmination of the ceremony, Archbishop Bryce placed the Tongan Crown on the monarch's head. Royalty and nobility from around the world were in attendance.

=== Reforms ===
As king, his first proclamation was that he would dispose of all his business assets as soon as reasonably possible, and in accordance with the law. Tonfön was sold in 2007, but efforts to divest from Shoreline Power were delayed after New Zealand investors withdrew following the 2006 Nukuʻalofa riots.

During his reign, George Tupou V oversaw reforms within the Tongan honours system which both expanded the number of Orders in the Kingdom and created rules to make the award of these Orders more egalitarian. In 2008, he bestowed noble titles to family members. Most significantly, he restored the title of prince to his nephew, Sitiveni Tukuʻaho (thereafter styled Prince Tungi), who is the eldest son of Prince Fatafehi ʻAlaivahamamaʻo Tukuʻaho.

Three days before his coronation ceremony on 1 August 2008, the King announced that he would relinquish most of his power and be guided by his Prime Minister's recommendations on most matters. The Prime Minister would also be in charge of day-to-day affairs. In addition, the King announced that there would be parliamentary reform and elections in 2010. Fielakepa, the spokesman for the royal palace, said, "The Sovereign of the only Polynesian kingdom ... is voluntarily surrendering his powers to meet the democratic aspirations of many of his people ... [The people] favour a more representative, elected Parliament. The king agrees with them."

In July 2010, the government published a new electoral roll and called on Tonga's 101,900 citizens to add their names to the document so that they could take part in the historic vote, which was due to be held on 25 November. This meant that a majority of members of the Legislative Assembly of Tonga would be elected for the first time, rather than appointed by the monarch or drawn from the aristocracy. The king remained head of state, but lost the ability to appoint the prime minister and cabinet members. However, it seemed certain that he would continue to appoint and administer the Judiciary of Tonga for the purposes of assuring that political independence and neutrality were retained. Tupou V also retained the power to commute prison sentences.

In September 2010, Tupou V sold the Tongan royal residence of ʻAtalanga, located in Epsom, New Zealand, which had a capital value of NZ$8.9 million. On 24 February 2012, less than a month before his death, he met with Pope Benedict XVI in Vatican City.

== Health ==
In September 2011, Tupou V underwent a surgery operation to remove his right kidney following the discovery of a tumour.

== Death and state funeral ==
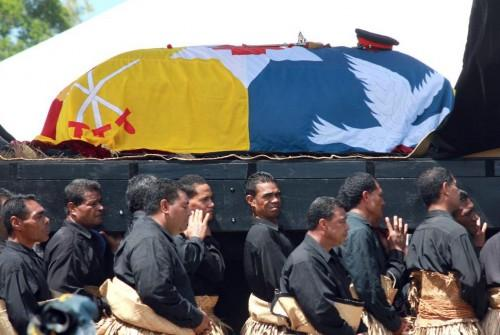
The coffin of King George Tupou V being carried to the tombs

George Tupou V died on 18 March 2012 at Queen Mary Hospital in Pok Fu Lam, Hong Kong, though governing institutions in Tonga did not immediately confirm it. His brother and heir presumptive Tupoutoʻa Lavaka was at the hospital when he died.

=== Reactions ===
A statement was due following a cabinet meeting the day after his death. Radio Australia reported that Tonga's largest religious organisation, the Free Wesleyan Church, said it would hold a prayer service at the queen mother's residence in Nukuʻalofa. Prime Minister Lord Tuʻivakanō later called on the country to pray for the royal family in a radio address.

In a message of condolence, Queen Elizabeth II described George Tupou V as "a true statesman who served his country with distinction". King Harald V of Norway sent a message of condolence to King Tupou VI, in which he expressed sympathy for the new King, his family and the people of Tonga.

New Zealand Prime Minister John Key said that the late king "believed that the monarchy was an instrument of change and can truly be seen as the architect of evolving democracy in Tonga. This will be his enduring legacy." Māori Kīngi Tūheitia extended his condolences to the Tongan royal family and people. Australian Prime Minister Julia Gillard said that King Tupou's death was the loss of "a great friend" to Australia and pointed to the change he led Tonga through as the "first truly democratic elections, held in November 2010, set the country on a new course." United States President Barack Obama said that King Tupou's death was the loss of "a friend" to the United States and the loss of "a visionary leader" to the people of Tonga.

=== Funeral ===
Following the official announcement of the death and giving the proclamation of the new king, now Tupou VI, the royal cabinet set up a committee for the organization of the state funeral. Lord Vaea was appointed the chairman of the committee. George Tupou V's body arrived on 26 March 2012, then lay in state at the Royal Palace in Nukuʻalofa for a day. The funeral, originally announced for 28 March 2012, was moved a day forward to 27 March on request of the new king. The decision led to criticism from members of the Tongan diaspora who were unable to travel to Tonga in time for the funeral.

Selected foreign dignitaries were invited by the committee to attend the funeral, including the Governor-General of Australia, Quentin Bryce, and the Governor-General of New Zealand, Jerry Mateparae. Royal guests at the ceremony included Prince Richard, Duke of Gloucester, and the Prince Hitachi and his wife, Princess Hitachi.

== Family ==
In 1974, though unmarried, he had a daughter, ʻIlima Lei Fifita Tohi. In 1997 she married police officer Tulutulumafua-ʻi-Olotele Kalaniuvalu, with whom she had three children. ʻIlima was ineligible to succeed to the throne as the Constitution of Tonga only allowed children born of a royal marriage to do so. Tupou V was engaged to another woman at the time of his death.

== Honours ==
Royal monogram of King George Tupou V

Styles of King George Tupou V
- Reference style: His Majesty ko ʻene ʻafio
- Spoken style: Your Majesty ko hoʻo ʻafio

=== National ===
- Tonga: Sovereign Knight Grand Cross with Collar of the Order of Pouono
- Tonga: Sovereign Knight Grand Cross of the Order of George Tupou I
- Tonga: Sovereign Knight Grand Cross with Collar of the Order of the Crown
- Tonga: 1st Sovereign Knight Grand Cross with Collar of the Order of Sālote Tupou III
- Tonga: 1st Sovereign Knight Grand Cross of the Order of Saint George
- Tonga: 1st Sovereign Knight Grand Cross of the Order of the Phoenix
- Tonga: 1st Sovereign Knight Grand Cross of the Order of the Royal House
- Tonga: 1st Sovereign Knight Grand Cross of the Royal Order of Oceania
- Tonga: Sovereign of the Royal Family Decoration of King George Tupou V
- Tonga: Sovereign Recipient of the Medal of Merit
- Tonga: Sovereign Recipient of the Red Cross Medal
- Tonga: Sovereign Recipient of the King Tāufaʻāhau Tupou IV Silver Jubilee Medal

=== Foreign ===
- France: Officer of the Order of the Legion of Honour
- (Georgia (country)) Bagrationi-Mukhrani Georgian Royal Family: Knight Grand Cross with Collar of the Royal Order of the Eagle of Georgia
- Hungary: Grand Cross of the Hungarian Order of Merit (15 September 2011)
- (Kingdom of the Two Sicilies) Two Sicilian Royal Family: Knight Grand Cross of the Royal Order of Francis I
- (Kingdom of the Two Sicilies) Two Sicilian Royal Family: Recipient of the Gold Benemerenti Medal
- Order of the Queen Tamara

== Family tree ==
Tupou family tree

Tuʻi Haʻatakalaua line	Tuʻi Tonga line	Tuʻi Kanokupolu line
Kalolaine Fusimatalili	George Tupou I	Fīnau Kaunanga
Fifita Vavʻau	Tēvita ʻUnga	Sālote Mafile‘o Pilolevu	Filiaipulotu
Fusipala Taukiʻonetuku	Fatafehi Toutaitokotaha
Lavinia Veiongo	George Tupou II	ʻAnaseini Takipō
Viliami Tungī Mailefihi	Sālote Tupou III	Vīlai Tupou (illegitimate son)	Tupou Seini
Tāufaʻāhau Tupou IV	Halaevalu Mataʻaho ʻAhomeʻe	Siaosi 'Alipate Tupou, Baron Vaea	Tuputupu Ma'afu-'o-Tukuialahi
George Tupou V	Tupou VI	Nanasipauʻu Tukuʻaho
ʻIlima Lei Fifita Tohi (illegitimate daughter)	Tupoutoʻa ʻUlukalala	Sinaitakala Fakafanua
Taufaʻahau Manumataongo

- Fox, James J.; Sather, Clifford (1996). Origins, Ancestry and Alliance: Explorations in Austronesian Ethnography. Canberra: Department of Anthropology, Australian National University. p. 252. ISBN 978-0-7315-2432-7. OCLC 245762652.
- Kaeppler, Adrienne Lois; D.C. (2008). The Pacific Arts of Polynesia and Micronesia. Oxford: Oxford University Press. p. 90. ISBN 978-0-19-284238-1. OCLC 236158882.
- Völkel, Svenja (2010). Social Structure, Space and Possession in Tongan Culture and Language: An Ethnolinguistic Study. Amsterdam; Philadelphia: John Benjamins Publishing. p. 45. ISBN 978-90-272-0283-3.
- Wood-Ellem, Elizabeth (1999). Queen Sālote of Tonga: The Story of an Era 1900-1965. Auckland, N.Z: Auckland University Press. p. front. ISBN 978-0-8248-2529-4. OCLC 262293605.

== Notes ==
George Tupou V House of Tupou Born: 4 May 1948 Died: 18 March 2012
Titles of nobility
Preceded by Tāufaʻāhau Tupou IV	3rd Chief Tupoutoʻa; 1966–2006	Succeeded by Tupou VI
Regnal titles
Preceded by Tāufaʻāhau Tupou IV	King of Tonga; 2006–2012	Succeeded by Tupou VI
