= Meleane Pau'uvale =

Tongan community leader in New Zealand (born c.1949)

Meleane Pau'uvale ONZM
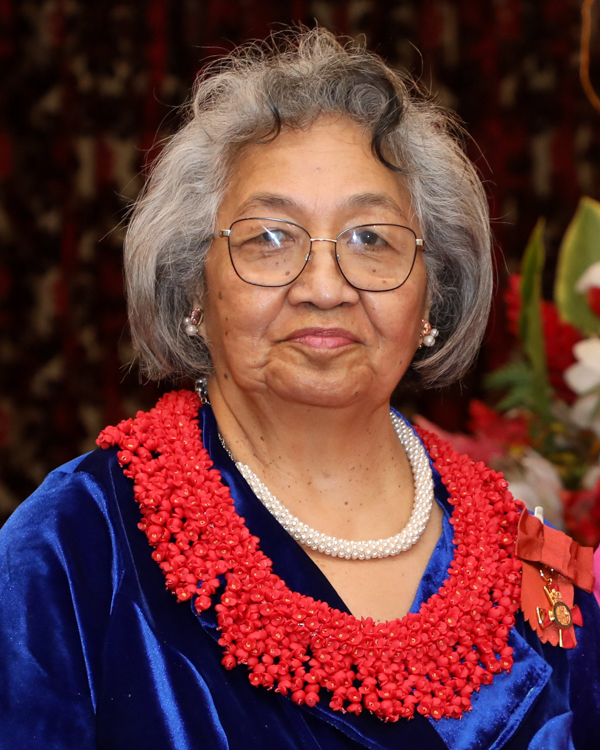
- Pau'uvale in 2023
- Born: 1948 or 1949 (age 75–76); Ha'akio Tukulalo Olo'ua, Vava'u, Tonga
- Occupation: Educator

Meleane Lolohea Pau'uvale ONZM (born 1948 or 1949) is a Tongan educator, language activist, and community leader in New Zealand.

After arriving in New Zealand from Tonga in the 1990s, Pau'uvale identified a lack of resources for Tongan cultural and linguistic education among the community there. Her efforts to bridge this gap were recognised in 2023 when she was named an Honorary Officer of the New Zealand Order of Merit.

== Biography ==
Meleane Pau'uvale was born in Ha'akio Tukulalo Olo'ua in the Tongan district of Vava'u around 1949. She married Siosifa Pau'uvale, a fellow educator, with whom she had four children. For three decades, she taught in high schools run by the Free Wesleyan Church of Tonga.

In the 1990s, she moved to New Zealand, where she realised there was a need for education focused on Tongan language and culture for the Tongan community there. She became known for her work on early childhood education and language advocacy.

In 1999, Pau'uvale founded the Akoteu Kato Kakala Early Childhood Education Centre in her garage in Māngere, outside Auckland, New Zealand. She eventually secured official recognition and funding for the centre, which is now based in Ōtara. She continues to lead the school and serve as its head teacher.

Pau'uvale has also been a leader in efforts to support the Tongan community across New Zealand, including through establishing the Alaha Manongi educational service, organising Tongan Language Week, and designing the Kato Kakala health framework for Tongan families. She helped publish three Tongan-language books of poetry and short stores, and the centre has also produced digital tools for Tongan cultural education.

In the 2023 King's Birthday and Coronation Honours, Pau'uvale was appointed an Honorary Officer of the New Zealand Order of Merit, for services to the Tongan community and education.
