= Tomiteau Finau =

Tongan civil servant, lawyer and politician

Member of the Legislative Assembly
- In office 1979–1981
- Preceded by: Lupeti Finau
- In office 1971–1974
- Constituency: Tongatapu

Personal details
- Died: 28 October 1984 (aged 59); Nukuʻalofa, Tonga

Tomiteau Finau (died 28 October 1984) was a Tongan civil servant, lawyer and politician. He served as a member of the Legislative Assembly in two spells between 1971 and 1974.

== Biography ==
The son of the MP Molitoni Finau, Tomiteau was educated at the Free Wesleyan Primary School in Nukunuku and Tupou College, where he was awarded a maamaloa certificate for being the outstanding student in his year in 1943. He went on to study at the University of Auckland. In July 1954 he joined the civil service as a senior clerk in the Audit Department. He transferred to the Ministry of Works in July 1956 as a first class clerk, before leaving the civil service in September 1959 to work as an attorney. He was a member of the Free Wesleyan Church trust and served as a legal adviser to the church.

In 1972 he was elected to the Legislative Assembly, serving until 1975. From 1975 he became an adviser to the Nukunuku Secondary School. When his brother Lupeti – also an MP – died in 1979, he replaced him for the remainder of the parliamentary term. However, he was defeated in the 1981 elections.

In January 1980 he was appointed to the Commodities Board, and also served on the Tonga Water Board. In 1983 he was appointed to the Royal Land Commission. He died in Vaiola Hospital in Nukuʻalofa in October 1984 at the age of 59.
