= King George Tupou V Royal Family Order =

King George Tupou V Royal Family Order Ko e Fakalangilangi Fale 'Alo 'o Kingi Sia'osi Tupou V

Awarded by King of Tonga
- Type: Family Order
- Royal house: House of Tupou
- Eligibility: Ladies
- Status: Dormant
- Sovereign: King Tupou VI
- Grand Mistress: Queen Nanasipauʻu
- Grades: Member (R.F.O.)

Precedence
- Next (higher): Order of the Phoenix
- Next (lower): Royal Household Order of Tonga
- Ribbon of the order

The King George Tupou V Royal Family Order was an order conferred as a sign of personal esteem from King George Tupou V to female members of the Royal family of Tonga.

== History ==
The King George Tupou V Family Order was established by His Majesty George Tupou V, The King of Tonga. The Order was established by King George in 2008 upon his accession to the throne, following the death of his father, King Tāufaʻāhau Tupou IV. King George modelled his Royal Family Order after those established by the British Sovereigns. The tradition of founding and conferring a Royal Family Order is intended to recognise Ladies of the Royal Family of Tonga and high-ranking female members of the Monarch's Court. The King George Tupou V Royal Family Order is not open for award to gentlemen.

== Insignia ==
The Order shows a portrait of King George Tupou V in uniform, realized in enamels upon ivory surrounded by a frame of silver and diamonds and surmounted by the royal crown of Tonga in silver and enamels.

The ribbon is in water green silk.

== Notable members ==
- H.M. Halaevalu Mata'aho 'Ahome'e, Queen Mother of Tonga (King Tupou VI's mother)
- H.R.H. Salote Mafile'o Pilolevu Tuita, Princess Royal of Tonga (King's sister)
- H.M. Nanasipauʻu Tukuʻaho, Queen of Tonga (King Tupou VI's consort)
- H.R.H. ʻAngelika Lātūfuipeka Halaʻevalu Mataʻaho Napuaʻokalani Tukuʻaho, princess of Tonga, (King's niece and King Tupou VI's daughter)
- H.R.H. Mele Siu'ilikutapu Tuku'aho, Princess of Tonga, Lady Kalaniuvalu-Fotofili (Prince Sione Ngu's eldest daughter and King Tupou VI's first cousin)
- H.R.H. Princess 'Elisiva Fusipala Tauki'onetuku Tuku'aho, Princess of Tonga, Lady Vaha'i (Prince Sione Ngu's 2nd daughter and King Tupou VI's first cousin)
- H.R.H. Princess Lavinia Mata-'o-Taone Tuku'aho, Princess of Tonga, Lady Ma'afu (Prince Sione Ngu's 3rd daughter and King Tupou VI's first cousin)
- H.R.H. Princess Sinaitakala 'Ofeina-'e he-Langi Tuku'aho, Princess of Tonga, Lady Fakafanua (Prince Sione Ngu's 4th daughter, King Tupou VI's first cousin and Crown Princess' mother)

== See also ==
- Royal Family Order
