= Neiafu Market =

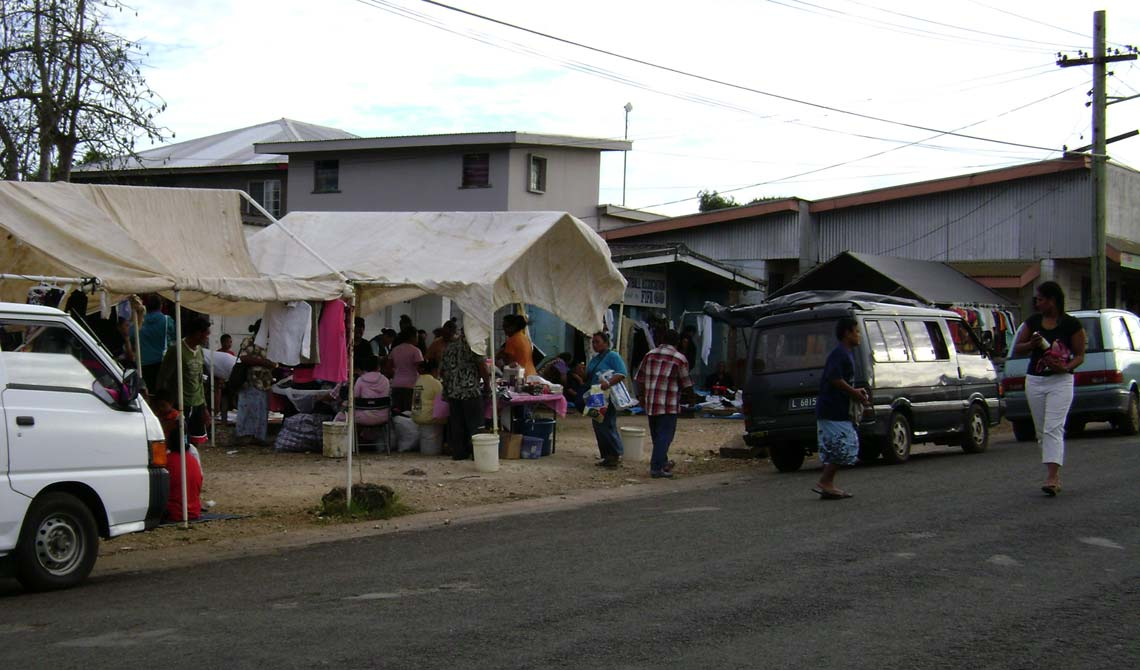
Neiafu Market

Neiafu is a relatively new Saturday market and shopping centre on Vava'u, Tonga. It is regarded as a municipal market and sells a range of items, including handicrafts, ancient headrests, kava bowls, stone adzes, old whale teeth and other craftswork. Also sold are taro, alocasia, manioc, yams as well as bananas, amongst others. The market is well connected by bus and minibus to surrounding villages on the island.
