= Titilupe Fanetupouvava'u Tuita-Tupou Tu'ivakano =

Tongan diplomat (born 1978)

- The Honorable
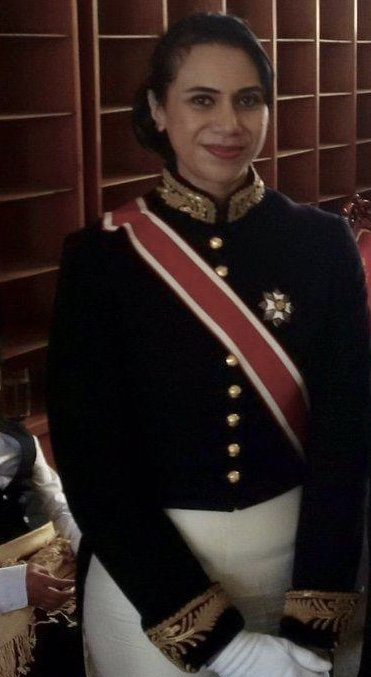
- Born: 12 August 1978 (age 48)
- Spouse: Siaosi Kiu Tau-ki-Vailahi Kaho Tu'ivakano (m. 2007)
- Issue: Simon; Michaela; Fatafehi
- Father: Siosaia Ma’ulupekotofa Tuita, 9th Lord Tuita
- Mother: Princess Salote Mafileʻo Pilolevu, Princess Royal of Tonga
- Occupation: Diplomat

Personal details
- Education: University of Oxford

Titilupe Fanetupouvava'u Tuita-Tupou Tu'ivakano (born 12 August 1978) is a Tongan diplomat, who is the High Commissioner of Tonga to the United Kingdom, Ambassador to the Netherlands, and Ambassador to Luxembourg.

== Biography ==
Tuita-Tupou Tu'ivakano has a BA in Anthropology in 1999, and PG Cert in Diplomatic Studies from the University of Oxford. Her first career was as a news presenter, before joining the civil service in 2001. In 2006 she was appointed Assistant Lord Chamberlain of the Palace Office. From 2012 to 2018 she held the role of Chief of Protocol at the Tongan Ministry of Foreign Affairs and Trade.

Previously she studied at Tonga High School, Nukualofa, Tongatapu.

Queen Elizabeth II accredited Tuita-Tupou Tu'ivakano as High Commissioner of Tonga to the United Kingdom on 27 June 2018. The role had previously been held by her father the Honourable Siosa’ia Ma’ulupekotofa Tuita, from 1989 to 1992. On 25 September 2020 she was also appointed Ambassador to Luxembourg - the first time the country has accepted a Tongan representative. On 16 December 2021 her letters of accreditation as Ambassador to the Netherlands were also accepted.

On 4 August 2020, she formally deposited the ratification instruments for the Worst Forms of Child Labour Convention together with International Labour Organisation Director-General, Guy Ryder, which was the first time an ILC convention was ratified by all member states.

As a member of the Tongan royal family, her uncle is Tupou VI of Tonga and she is also the great-grand-daughter of Queen Salote Tupou III. Tuita-Tupou Tu'ivakano is Patron of the Tonga Women’s Rugby Association, and of the Tonga Golf Club.

== Personal life ==
In 2007 she became engaged to Major Siaosi Kiu Tau-ki-Vailahi Kaho (to); they married the same year, on 30 April civilly and on 3 May religiously. They have three children, one son and two daughters:

- Hon. Simon Tu’iha’atu ‘Unga George Ma’ulupekotofa Tu’ivakano (born on 14 April 2011 at Auckland City Hospital).
- Hon. Michaela Mary Rose Halaevalu Tokilupe Hala-‘i-Vahamama‘o Tu’ivakano (born on 21 May 2012).
- Hon. Fatafehi Lapaha Salote Koila Tu’ivakano (born on 1 December 2013).
