= Talolakepa Fulivai =

Tongan noble and politician

Member of the Legislative Assembly
- Constituency: Vavaʻu Nobles

Personal details
- Died: 12 May 1985 (aged 70) Nukuʻalofa, Tonga

Lord Talolakepa Fulivai (died 12 May 1985) was a Tongan noble and politician.

== Biography ==
A lay preacher in the Free Wesleyan Church, he acceded to the noble title Fulivai and owned the Hunga estate on Vavaʻu. He also served on the church's Vavaʻu District Board of Trustees.

He was elected to the Legislative Assembly as one of the noble representatives of Vavaʻu, serving in the Assembly for over a decade. During his time as an MP he was also acting Speaker on several occasions. He died in May 1985 and was buried in Neiafu. Married twice, he was survived by 13 children.
