= Lupeti Finau =

Tongan civil servant and politician

Member of the Legislative Assembly
- In office 1978–1979
- Succeeded by: Tomiteau Finau
- Constituency: Tongatapu

Personal details
- Died: 11 March 1979

Lupeti Finau (died 11 March 1979) was a Tongan civil servant and politician. He served as a member of the Legislative Assembly from 1978 until his death the following year.

== Biography ==
Finau was one of the children of politician Molitoni Finau. He won a government scholarship to study at Newington College in Sydney, joining the school in 1933. Like his father, he excelled at sport, representing the school in athletics, cricket and rugby, and winning the school's 120 yard hurdles, high jump and shot put competitions in 1936.

After returning to Tonga he joined the civil service, rising to become Taxation Commissioner, and later Deputy Commissioner of the Inland Revenue. He was also involved in rugby, coaching the Hihifo team to victory in the Hellaby Shield in 1951, and later becoming president of the Tonga Rugby Union.

He was elected to the Legislative Assembly in the 1978 elections, but died in March 1979. His seat in the legislature was taken by his brother Tomiteau.
