= Salote Mafileʻo Pilolevu Tuita =

Sālote Pilolevu Tuita
- Princess Royal of Tonga
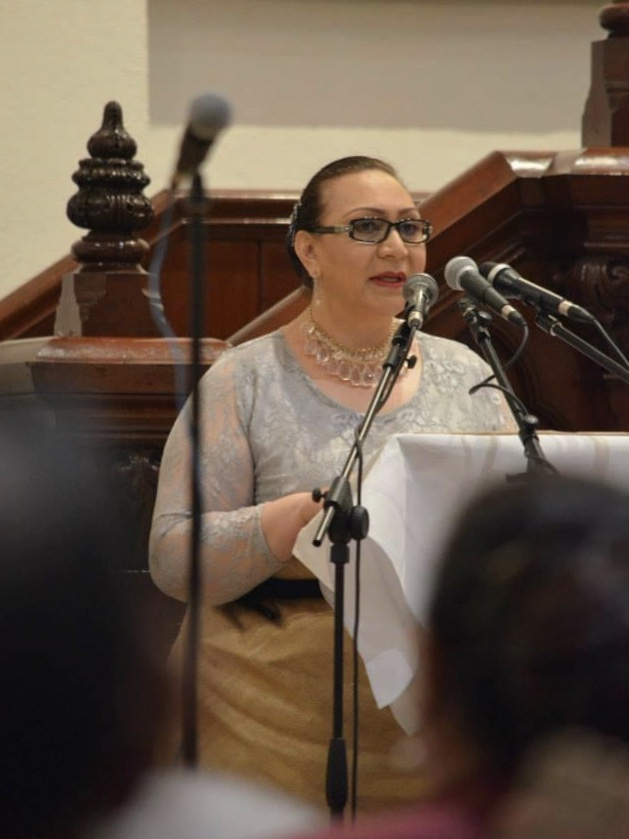
- Salote in 2013
- Born: Salote Mafileʻo Pilolevu Tuku'aho; 14 November 1951 (age 74); Royal Palace, Nukuʻalofa, Tonga
- Spouse: Siosaʻia Maʻulupekotofa Tuita (m. 1976)
- Issue: Hon. Sālote Lupepau'u Salamasina Purea Vahine Ari'i 'Oe Hau Tuita Taione; Hon. Titilupe Fanetupouvava'u Tuita Tu'ivakano; Hon. Frederica Lupe'uluiva Fatafehi 'o Lapaha Tuita Filipe; Hon. Lupeolo Halaevalu Moheofo Virginia Rose Tuita 'Aleamotu'a; Hon. Sione Ikamafana (Tuita) Tuku'aho
Names
- Sālote Mafileʻo Pilolevu Tukuʻaho
- House: Tupou
- Father: Tāufaʻāhau Tupou IV
- Mother: Halaevalu Mataʻaho ʻAhomeʻe
- Religion: Methodism

Salote Mafile'o Pilolevu, Princess Royal (née Sālote Maf ileʻo Pilolevu Tuku'aho; born on 14 November 1951) is a Tongan princess and member of the Tongan royal family.

== Early life and education ==
Salote was born at the Royal Palace, Nukuʻalofa on 14 November 1951 as the second child and only daughter of the then Crown Prince Tāufaʻāhau and his wife, Crown Princess Halaevalu Mataʻaho, and a grandchild of Queen Sālote Tupou III of Tonga, for whom she is named after. She was christened into the Methodist Faith.

She was educated at the Anglican Diocesan School for Girls in Epsom, Auckland, New Zealand.

== Official life ==
=== Activities ===
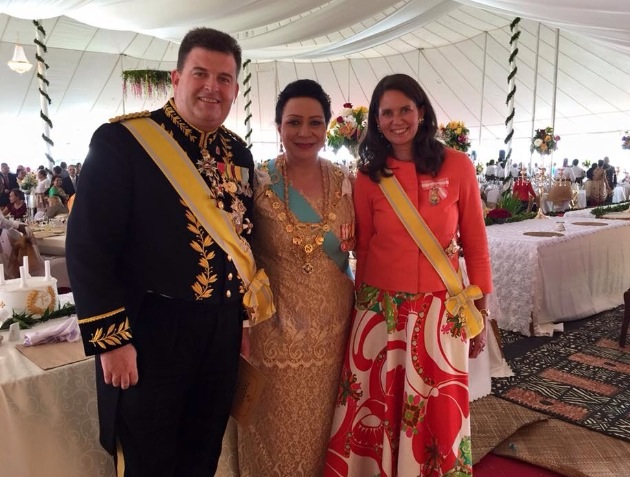
Princess Royal Salote Mafile'o Pilolevu Tuita, with Princess Marie-Therese of Hohenberg and Anthony Bailey at the coronation of King Tupou VI on 4 July 2015 in Nuku'alofa, Tonga.

In June 2013, as Patron of Tupou High School, the Princess Royal organized the 50th anniversary celebrations of the school. In November 2013, she hosted a reception to mark the 15th anniversary of diplomatic relations between Tonga and China; the guests of honour were Li Baodong, former Vice-Minister of Foreign Affairs and Li Xiaolin, former Chairperson of the China Power Investment Corporation.

As a member of the royal family, and on behalf of the King she carries out official engagements, which includes inaugurating new schools, new facilities, and other public attractions. As well as carrying out official engagements within Tonga, she also pays official visits abroad on behalf of the King. Within Tonga, the Princess Royal attends royal events such as the coronations of her brother, King Tupou VI and the late King George Tupou V military parades, christenings, royal and noble weddings and birthdays.

=== Regency ===
Until the accession of her younger brother, King Tupou VI, she had usually served as Regent in the King's absence. But on 11 March 2011, her brother, the late King George Tupou V, abolished the need for a Regent in his absence, an official press release from the palace stated, "His Majesty has decided that there will not be a Regent appointed during his absence as the new Constitutional arrangements make such an appointment unnecessary". The Princess Royal had served as Regent on four occasions.

2008

- On 29 May she announced that the government would introduce a political reform bill by June 2008.
- On 6 November she delivered the closing address of the year to the Legislative Assembly of Tonga.

2010

- On 14 November she led the Memorial Day March and inspected the H.M's Armed Forces as Chief Commander.

2011

- On 25 January she appointed the new prime minister Sialeʻataongo Tuʻivakanō.
- On 26 January she appointed 'Uliti Uata as Minister of Health.
- On 13 January she presided over the opening of the first meeting of the Legislative Assembly.

The Princess Royal is currently 8th in the Line of Succession to the Tongan throne.

== Marriage and issue ==
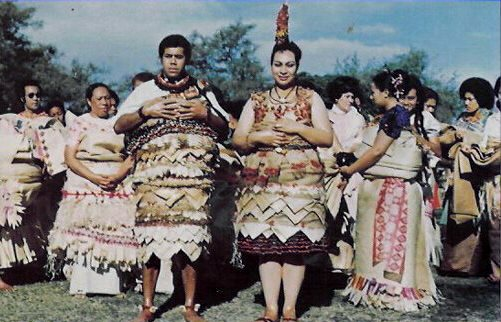
Princess Salote Pilolevu and The Hon. Siosa'ia Ma'ulupekotofa Tuita on their wedding day in 1976

The Princess Royal, with her husband, The Honourable Siosaʻia Maʻulupekotofa, Lord Tuita of ʻUtungake, a Tongan noble and former diplomat, are the parents of four daughters:

- The Honourable Sālote Lupepau'u Salamasina Purea Vahine Ari'i 'Oe Hau Tuita. Her first marriage was an arranged marriage to the son of a Tongan nobleman, Lord Fusitu'a. Due to a private adult home video being released of Hon. Lupepau'u and Lord Fusitu'a they divorced in 2008. They had one daughter, Honourable Anaseini Tupou Veihola Ikaleti Olo-'i-Fangatapu Phaedra Tuita-Fusitu'a. She then married a former Tonga national rugby union team player Epi Taione in a private wedding ceremony in Fiji on 17 August 2013, with whom she has one son, Master Reggie Kite 'i Mahina Taione.
- The Honourable Titilupe Fanetupouvava'u Tuita Tu'ivakano, was formerly engaged to the grandson of the late head of state of Samoa Malietoa Tanumafili II. The engagement was later called off. Fanetupouvava'u married in an arranged marriage to the son of the former prime minister of Tonga, Sialeʻataongo Tuʻivakanō. She is the only daughter to have married and stayed married to nobility, with her children entitled to be styled with Honourable titles. Together they have three children together, The Honourable Simon Ma'ulupekotofa, The Honourable Michaela and the Honourable Fatafehi.
- The Honourable Frederica Lupe'uluiva Fatafehi 'o Lapaha Tuita Filipe, or known as Frederica Filipe like her older sister, Salote Lupepau'u, she married a commoner, Johnny Filipe who is the son of a Tongan businessman Sione Mateialona Filipe in Auckland, New Zealand, on 10 August 2013. With her husband, she has three children.
- The Honourable Lupeolo Halaevalu Moheofo Virginia Rose Tuita 'Aleamotu'a. Married in June 2016 to Lt Lopeti Aleamotu'a, second son of Hon. Mosese Tangaki-Taulupe-ki-Folaha 'Aleamotu'a and his wife Mele Simiki Taufa 'Aleamotu'a (née Walter). She has one daughter, Kaimana Aleamotu'a.

and a son, whom they raised from her brother, the late Prince Fatafehi ʻAlaivahamamaʻo Tuku'aho (27 September 1954 – 17 February 2004):

- The Honourable Fatafehi Sione Ikamafana Tānekinga ʻo Tonga Tuku'aho is the second son of Prince Fatafehi 'Alaivahamama'o Tuku'aho and the Hon. Alaileula Tuku'aho; (Dowager Ma'atu). On 29 October 2022, the Honourable Sione Ikamafana Tuku'aho married Lanu Hahau Faletau.

== Honours ==
- Tonga: Dame Grand Cross with Collar of the Royal Order of Pouono
- Tonga: Dame Grand Cross with Collar of the Order of Queen Salote Tupou III
- Tonga: Dame Grand Cross of the Order of the Crown of Tonga
- Tonga: Dame of the King George Tupou V Royal Family Order
- Tonga: Recipient of the King Tupou VI Coronation Medal
- Tonga: Recipient of the King George Tupou V Coronation Medal
- Tonga: Recipient of the King Tāufaʻāhau Tupou IV Silver Jubilee Medal

=== Foreign ===
- Japan: Paulownia Dame Grand Cordon of the Order of the Precious Crown

Salote Mafileʻo Pilolevu Tuita House of Tupou Born: 14 November 1951
Lines of succession
Preceded by Princess Lātūfuipeka Tukuʻaho	Succession to the Tongan throne 8th position	Succeeded by Hon. Sālote Lupepau'u Salamasina Purea Vahine Arii 'Oe Hau Tuita
