= Siosaʻia Maʻulupekotofa Tuita =

Tongan Noble and government minister

Siosaia Ma'ulupekotofa Tuita
- Lord Tuita in 2006
- Born: 31 March 1951 (age 75)
- Spouse: Pilolevu, Princess Royal of Tonga (m. 1976)
- Issue: Sālote Lupepau'u Salamasina Purea Vahine Ari'i 'Oe Hau Tuita Taione; Titilupe Fanetupouvava'u Tuita Tu'ivakano; Frederica Lupe'uluiva Fatafehi 'o Lapaha Tuita Filipe; Lupeolo Halaevalu Moheofo Virginia Rose Tuita Aleamotu'a; Sione Ikamafana Tuku'aho
- Father: Siosaia Aleamotuʻa Laufilitonga Tuita
- Mother: Fatafehi Lapaha Tupou
- Religion: Methodism

Siosa'ia Ma'ulupekotofa Tuita (born 31 March 1951) is a Tongan royal and diplomat. He is the current Chief Tuita, Lord Tuita.

== Career ==
He received his education at Wanganui College, Auckland University and the University of Oxford. He was appointed Official Translator of the Tongan Prime Minister's office in 1972 and then served for several years in the Tongan Foreign Service, including as High Commissioner to the United Kingdom in 1989–1992 and as Consul General in San Francisco from 1992 to 1996. From 1998 to 2002 Tuita was governor of Vava'u. In 2002 he was appointed to the cabinet of Tonga with the title minister of Agriculture, Forestry, Fisheries and Nutrition. In May 2006 he was appointed as Minister of Lands Survey, Natural Resources and Environment in a Cabinet reshuffle. He was appointed acting governor of Vava'u in 2009.

In 2010, he was appointed as Tongan Consul General to the United States again, with an office based out of San Francisco, California. He currently lives with his wife, Princess Salote Mafile'o Pilolevu Tuita, and their family, dividing their time between residences in Tau'akipulu and Hillsborough, California.

== Marriage ==
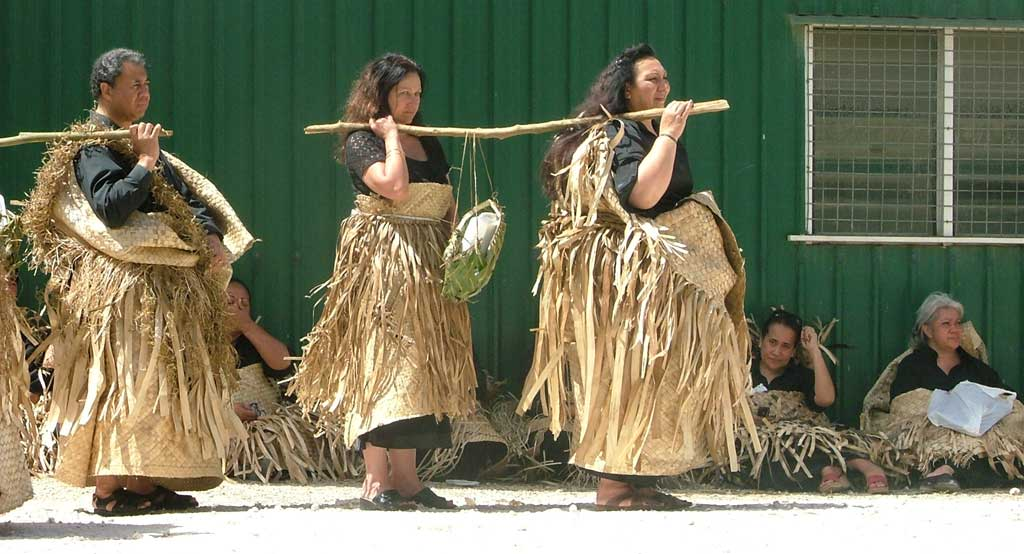
Lord Ma'ulupekotofa Tuita (left) and Princess Pilolevu Tuita (right)

Tuita married the Princess Royal, Salote Pilolevu Tuita, the only daughter of King Sia'osi Taufa'ahau Tupou IV in the Chapel Royal, Nuku'alofa, on 20 July 1976. They are the parents of four daughters:

- Sālote Lupepau'u Salamasina Purea Vahine Ari'i 'Oe Hau Tuita Taione,
- Titilupe Fanetupouvava'u Tuita Kaho (Tu'ivakano),
- Frederica Lupe'uluiva Fatafehi 'o Lapaha Tuita Filipe,
- Lupeolo Halaevalu Moheofo Virginia Rose Tuita

and a son, whom they adopted from her brother Prince Fatafehi ʻAlaivahamamaʻo Tukuʻaho (27 September 1979 – 17 February 2004) :

- Hon. Fatafehi Sione Ikamafana Tānekinga ʻo Tonga Tuku'aho (2003–)

== Honours ==
=== Orders ===
==== Tonga ====
- Knight Grand Cross of the Most Illustrious Order of Queen Salote Tupou III (31 July 2008)

=== Decorations ===
==== Tonga ====
- King Taufa’ahau Tupou IV Coronation Silver Jubilee Medal (4 July 1992)
- King George Tupou V Coronation Medal (1 August 2008)
- King George Tupou VI Coronation Medal (4 July 2015)
