= Royal Household Order of Tonga =

Insignia of the order

Royal Household Order of Tonga (Ko e Fakalangilangi Fale ‘Alo) is an order of chiverly in Tonga, which was founded on July 31, 2009 by King George Tupou V. It is conferred to people who have rendered an outstanding service to the crown. It has replaced the Order of King George Tupou I.

The order has five classes (Grand Cross, Grand Officer, Commander, Officer, Knight) as well as three medal classes (gold, silver, bronze). The ribbon of the order is yellow with light blue stripes:

- ribbon bar
