= Sekonaia Tu'akoi =

Tongan policeman, lawyer and politician

Member of the Legislative Assembly
- In office 1951–1972
- Constituency: Tongatapu

Personal details
- Born: 1912
- Died: 3 October 1982 (aged 70)

Sekonaia Tu'akoi (1912 – October 1982) was a Tongan policeman, lawyer and politician. He served as a member of the Legislative Assembly from 1951 until 1972.

== Biography ==
After studying at Tupou College and Tonga College, Tu'akoi joined the police as a constable in 1933. He was promoted to sergeant major, before leaving the police to become a lawyer in 1947.

In 1951 he was elected to the Legislative Assembly from the Tongatapu constituency. He was subsequently re-elected in 1954, 1957, 1960, 1963, 1966 and 1969. In 1971 he was appointed a police magistrate.

He died in October 1982 at the age of 70.
