= Samisoni Fonomanu Tu'i'afitu =

Tongan politician (1933–2005)

Personal details
- Born: 21 December 1933
- Died: 4 October 2005 (aged 71)
- Education: Newington College; Seddon Memorial Technical College

Hon. Tu'i'afitu (21 December 1933 – 4 October 2005), born Samisoni Fonomanu Tu'i'afitu, was a Tongan nobleman, Member of Parliament, and the Governor of Vavaʻu.

== Education ==
Tu'i'afitu was educated at Tonga High School and then in Australia at Newington College (1953–1955). He then attended Seddon Memorial Technical College in Auckland, New Zealand.

== Public service career ==
He joined the Tongan Civil Service as a clerk in 1962 and was promoted to the role of administrative officer at Fua'amotu International Airport in 1968. He became senior administration officer at the airport in 1984 and then senior administration officer of the Lupepau'u Airport in Vavaʻu in 1987.

== Parliament ==
Tu'i'afitu served as Minister of Lands, Survey, and Natural Resources.

== Governor ==
Hon. Tu'i'afitu was appointed to the Noble title of Tu'i'afitu in 1976 and as Acting Governor of Vavaʻu in 1988 and then Governor of Vavaʻu in 1991.
