= Harry Percival Vete =

Tongan businessman and politician

Harry Percival Vete (also known as Hale Vete) was a Tongan businessman, politician, and member of the Legislative Assembly of Tonga. He was an early member of the Church of Jesus Christ of Latter-day Saints in Tonga.

Vete trained as a lawyer, and started a business in 1934. By 1949 he owned two stores, three trucks, and a taxi service. He was elected to the Legislative Assembly as one of three people's Representatives for Tongatapu at the 1948 Tongan general election. He was re-elected in the 1954 election.

Vete and his wife were the first Tongans to go to the temple of the Church. Vete was baptized in 1926. In 1949 Vete, his wife, and child traveled to the United States where they were sealed in the Idaho Falls Idaho Temple.
