= Siosaia Aleamotuʻa Laufilitonga Tuita =

Tongan politician

Siosaia Aleamotu'a Laufilitonga Tuita

Deputy Prime Minister of Tonga
- In office 1974–1989
- Prime Minister: Fatafehi Tuʻipelehake
- Preceded by: Mahe Tupouniua
- Succeeded by: Baron Vaea

Personal details
- Born: 29 August 1920 Lapaha, Tongatapu
- Died: 30 November 1998 (aged 78)

Siosaia Aleamotu'a Laufilitonga Tuita, styled Lord Tuita, was a Tongan politician and former cabinet minister.

Lord Tuita was born 29 August 1920 at Lapaha, Tongatapu. He was educated at Tupou College, Wesley College, Auckland, and Oxford in England.

He held several public offices: Governor of Vavaʻu since 1957, Minister of Lands in 1962, Minister of Police from 1964 to 1965, Minister of Lands and Minister of Health in 1965., and Deputy Prime Minister since 1974. He was acting prime minister in 1981. He was a member of the King of Tonga's privy council, and also member of the Legislative Assembly of Tonga.

He inherited the title Lord Tuita in 1972. He was the father of current Lord Tuita, Siosaʻia Maʻulupekotofa Tuita. He died on 30 November 1998.
