= Order of Queen Sālote Tupou III =

Tongan knighthood order

Order of Sālote Tupou III Ko e Fakalangilangi Ma’olunga ‘o Sālote Tupou III
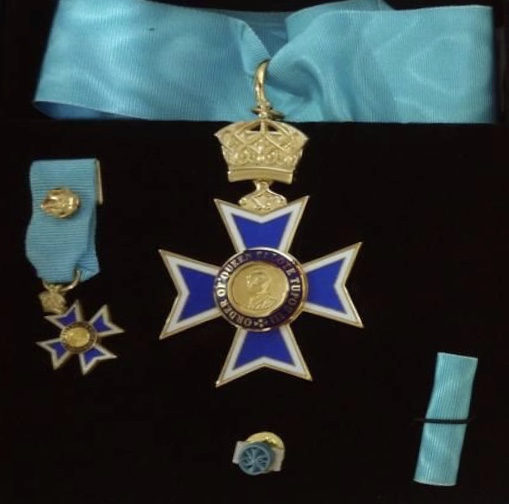
- Commander's insignia

Awarded by King of Tonga
- Type: Order
- Established: 28 June 2008
- Royal house: House of Tupou
- Awarded for: Personal services to the sovereign
- Status: Constituted
- Grand Master: Tupou VI
- Grades: Knight Grand Cross (KGQS); Grand Cross (GCQS); Commander (CQS); Member (MQS)

Precedence
- Next (higher): Order of the Crown of Tonga
- Next (lower): Royal Military Order of St George
- Ribbon of the order

The Most Illustrious Order of Queen Sālote Tupou III is a knighthood order of the Kingdom of Tonga.

== History ==
The Order was established on 28 June 2008 by King George Tupou V to commemorate his grandmother, Queen Sālote Tupou III, who, during the 47 years of her government (5 April 1918 – 16 December 1965), had guided the state of Tonga to a substantial economical and social evolution.

The Order has been created as the principal civil reward for meritorious personal services to the sovereign. Above all, it is awarded as a Family Order for Tongan & foreign Royal Families.

== Classes ==
The Order consists of four classes:

- Knight Grand Cross (K.C.Q.S.) - Collar, Star, Sash, Miniature & Rosette
- Grand Cross (G.C.Q.S) - Sash, Star, Miniature & Rosette
- Commander (C.Q.S.) - Necklet badge from a ribbon, Miniature & Rosette
- Member (M.Q.S.) - Breast badge from a ribbon, Miniature & Rosette

== Insignia ==
The ribbon for the two upper classes is a 102mm sky-blue-ultramarine Sash (Ladies Sash approx. 74mm)

=== Knight Grand Cross ===
The Collar is a double gold chain, the centre-piece looks like being a gold knot, tied with a ribbon in the base (also gold). Moving upwards from the centre-piece on either side, a gold dove with its wings displayed and turned slightly towards the centre, alternating with the golden knot of the centre-piece. The Collar Badge is a deep-blue enamelled Maltese cross with a white edge, between each arm is a golden dove (from the collar) with a fleur-de-lis at the dove's claws. The gold central medallion has a raised bust of Queen Salote Topou III, also in gold. The dark-blue riband probably has the name of the order in gold capital letters, above the cross is a gold Tongan crown. The Star is an 8-pointed silver, silver-gilt and enamel faceted star, with the collar badge superimposed in the centre (minus the crown).

=== Grand Cross ===
The Star is an 8-pointed silver and enamel star, the collar badge is placed overall in the centre, the dove and the fleurs-de-lis are silver.

=== Commander ===
The necklet badge is similar to the collar-badge except, that the central medallion is silver-gilt, the riband is dark-blue with the legend in gold capital letters, all suspended from a gold Tongan crown.

The necklet ribbon is sky-blue-ultramarine and approx. 41mm .

=== Member ===
The breast badge is, as the Commander's class, in silver and enamel (above, except smaller and the suspended crown is silver).

The breast ribbon is approximately 38 mm (as above).

== Notable recipients ==
=== National recipients ===
- King Tupou VI (18.03.2012 - ) : Grand Master - Knight Grand Cross (31.7.2008)
- Crown Prince Tupoutoʻa ʻUlukalala : Knight Grand Cross (31.7.2008)
- Siosaʻia Maʻulupekotofa Tuita, 9th Tuita : Knight Grand Cross (31.7.2008)
- Princess Mele Siu'ilikutapu Kalaniuvalu-Fotofili (Prince Sione Ngu's eldest daughter) : Dame Grand Cross with Collar (31.7.2008)
- Kinikinilau Tuto'atasi, 7th Lord Fakafānua (Crown Princess' Father) : Knight Grand Cross (31.7.2008)
- Queen Nanasipauʻu Tukuʻaho Dame Grand Cross with Collar (30.6.2015)
- Queen Mother Halaevalu Mataʻaho ʻAhomeʻe : Dame Grand Cross
- Princess Salote Mafileʻo Pilolevu Tuita, The Princess Royal of Tonga : Dame Grand Cross with Collar (31.7.2008)

=== Foreign recipients ===
- Queen Elizabeth II of the United Kingdom : Dame Grand Cross (2012)
- King Jigme Khesar Namgyel Wangchuck of the Kingdom of Bhutan : Knight Grand Cross (14.5.2010)
- Empress Masako of the State of Japan : Dame Grand Cross (4.7.2015)
