= Tonga High School =

Location
- Nukuʻalofa; Tonga
- Coordinates: 21.1380°S 175.2046°W

Information
- Type: State
- Motto: Ki He Lelei Taha; To The Best
- Established: 1947
- Age: 11 to 18
- Language: English

Tonga High School is a selective state-owned co-ed secondary school located in Nukuʻalofa, Tonga. The school educates students aged 11 to 18 (Forms 1 - 7).

== History ==
Tonga High School was established in 1947 by Prince Tungi as the Minister of Education prior to his accession as King Taufa'ahau Tupou IV. The aim of the school is to provide an opportunity for students to achieve a level of education equivalent to that offered in neighbouring countries such as New Zealand and Australia.

The school is situated in Tonga's capital, Nukuʻalofa. The current school buildings were constructed with assistance from the Chinese Government. The buildings were officially opened on 2 July 2005. The facilities include 34 classrooms and 18 laboratories and can accommodate over a thousand students. A planned second phase of construction was due to begin in 2009 with the building of a gymnasium, swimming pool and a sports stadium.

Entry to Form 1 is restricted to those achieving the highest marks in national examinations taken by pupils in their last year of primary school.

There were 1,154 students enrolled at the school in 2005. Students can be members of four houses: Nua (Yellow), Kava (Red), Sangone (Blue) and Tele'a (Green).

The current Principal for Tonga High School is Ms 'Ana Uaafe Veikoso. Tonga high school has a brass band and the Band Master is Mr. Taniela Lolohea Manu.

The school celebrated its diamond jubilee in 2023.

== Notable people ==
=== Teachers ===
- Sosefo Fe‘aomoeata Vakata - Tongan politician
- Afuʻalo Matoto - Tongan politician
- Sialeʻataongo Tuʻivakanō - Tongan politician

=== Students ===
- Dr. Sanipisi Langi Huakavameiliku (first Tongan to attend Harvard University, as well as the first Tongan to achieve a Ph.D.)
- Viliami Latu - Tongan politician
- Pita Taufatofua - Australian taekwondo practitioner
- Clive Edwards (politician) - former Tongan Cabinet Minister
- Rev. Samisoni Fonomanu Tu'i'afitu - Tongan nobleman, Member of Parliament
- Dr. Futa Helu - founding classmember and Tongan philosopher, historian, educator, and founder of 'Atenisi University
- Hon. Titilupe Fanetupouvava'u Tuita-Tupou Tu'ivakano
