= Sione Laumanuʻuli Luani =

Tongan politician (1959–2010)

Lord Luani (18 June 1959 – 12 May 2010), born Sione Laumanuʻuli Luani, was a Tongan nobleman, Member of Parliament, and the Governor of Vavaʻu.

== Education ==
The son of MP Tongaleva Luani, Luani attended Newington College in Australia between 1972 and 1977, playing in the First XV Rugby Union team in his final two years of school. He was selected for NSW schoolboy rugby union team that won the 1977 National Title at TG Millner Field. In 1978 he attended Ohlone College, Fremont, California. Luani received a bachelor's degree in political science from the University of California, Berkeley after studying there from 1979 until 1982. In 1999 he was awarded a Diploma in Public Sector Management from Massey University in New Zealand.

== Public service career ==
In 1985, Luani joined the Prime Minister's Office and served as a Senior Executive Officer and the Principal Training Officer. As Senior Tourist Officer he joined the Tonga Visitors Bureau in 1990, becoming Deputy Director of Tourism in 1997. He joined the Tonga Broadcasting Commission in 2000 and rose to the office of Deputy General Manager.

== Parliament ==
In 2006 Luani was elected as the Nobles No.2 Representative for Vava’u in the Legislative Assembly of Tonga. He was a member of the Standing Committee on Finance since 2006 and since 2007 was Chairman of the Special Parliamentary Select Committee on Political Reform. He was reelected to parliament in 2008.

== Governor ==
Hon. Luani was appointed to the Noble title of Luani in 1987 and as Governor of Vavaʻu in July 2009. He died in office on May 12, 2010, at the governor's residence, "Niue", in Neiafu, Vavaʻu.

== Honours ==
National honours

- Order of the Crown of Tonga, Commander (31 July 2008).

Preceded by Akauola	Governor of Vava'u; 2009 – May 12, 2010	Succeeded by Feleti Sevele
