= Viliami Molofaha =

Tongan politician (died 1970)

Member of the Legislative Assembly

Personal details
- Died: 1970

Viliami Molofaha (died 1970) was a Tongan politician who served as a member of the Legislative Assembly.

== Biography ==
Molofaha worked for the Tongan police for several years. A resident of Neiafu, he represented Vavaʻu in the Agricultural Council, and was elected to the Legislative Assembly as one of the two MLAs from Vavaʻu.

Molofaha was married to Aulola. The couple adopted Aulola's nephew Malakai ‘Ake, who later became Tonga's Chief Medical Officer. He died in 1970.
