= Royal Military Order of St George =

Royal Military Order of St George Ko e Fakalangilangi Fakakaukau 'o Sa Sia'osi

Awarded by King of Tonga
- Type: Order
- Royal house: House of Tupou
- Eligibility: Militaries
- Awarded for: Meritorious military services
- Status: Constituted
- Grand Master: Tupou VI
- Grades: Grand Cross (GCStG); Grand Officer (GOStG); Commander (CStG); Officer (OStG); Member (MStG)

Precedence
- Next (higher): Order of Queen Sālote Tupou III
- Next (lower): Order of the Phoenix
- Ribbon of the order

The Royal Military Order of St George is a military knighthood order of the Kingdom of Tonga.

== History ==
It was founded by King George Tupou V in 2009 to reward distinguished and meritorious military services by members of the uniformed services, including the Tonga Defence Services and foreigners.

== Classes ==
The Order is awarded in five classes:

- Grand Cross (G.C.St.G.)
- Grand Officer (G.O.St.G.)
- Commander (C.St.G.)
- Officer (O.St.G.)
- Member (M.St.G.)

== Insignia ==
- The badge consists of a cross-hatched red-enamelled and gold-bordered Greek cross, having in its centre a medallion featuring in its centre an enamelled miniature of Saint George killing the dragon, the whole surrounded by a red ring with an inscription in gold letters "ROYAL MILITARY ORDER OF ST GEORGE". The badge is hanging from the sash through a royal crown of Tonga in gold.
- The breast star of the Order is a medallion, similar to the badge medallion, at the center of a radiating star of rhomboidal shape.
- The ribbon is completely dark red.
