= Order of the Crown of Tonga =

Tongan Order of Knighthood

Royal Order of the Crown of Tonga Ko e Fakalangilangi ‘o Kalauni ‘o Tonga
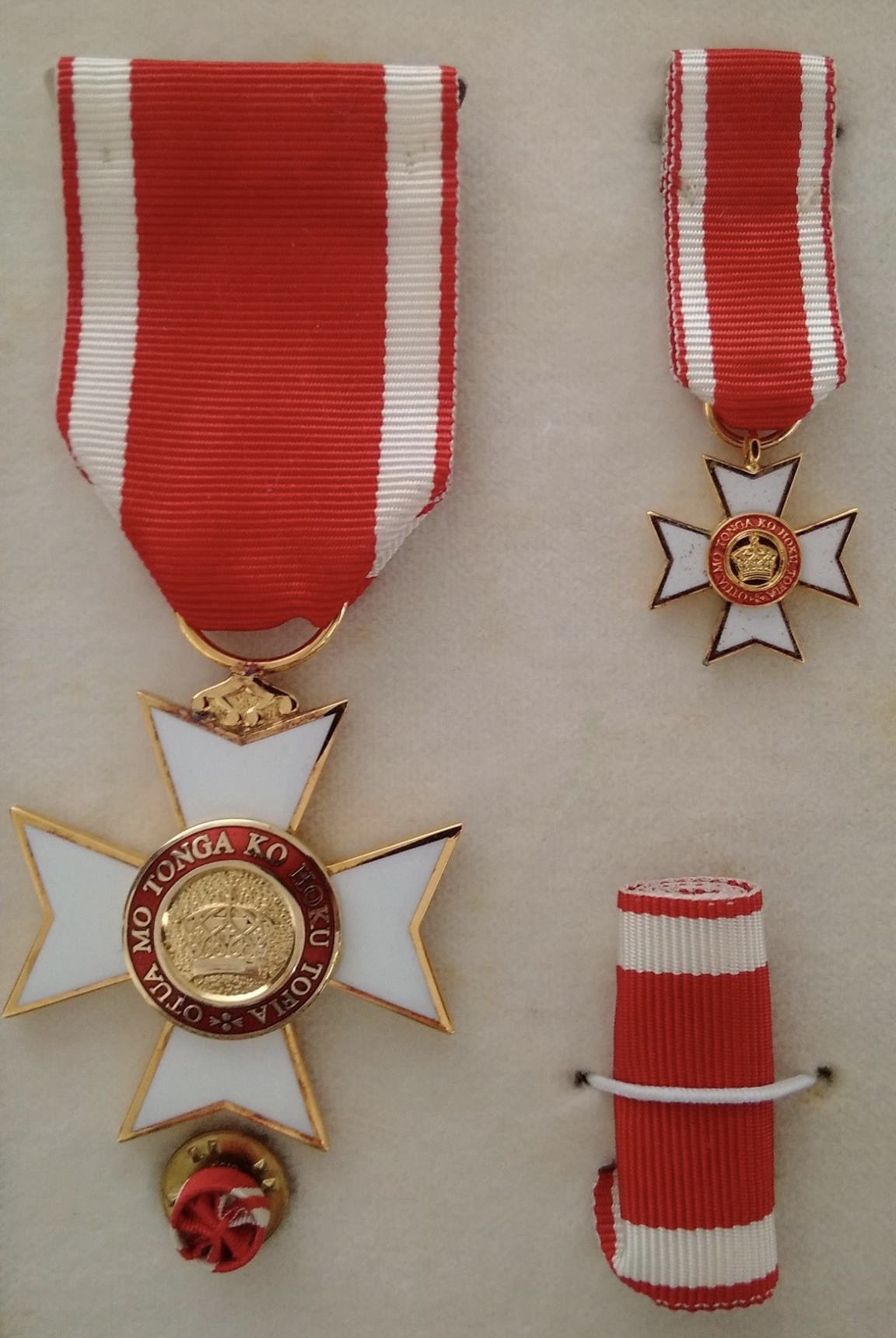
- Insignia of Member of the Order

Awarded by King of Tonga
- Type: Order of Merit
- Royal house: House of Tupou
- Motto: KO'E 'OTUA MO TONGA KO HOKU TOFI'A. ("God and Tonga Are My Inheritance")
- Eligibility: Civilians and militaries, Tongan or foreigners
- Awarded for: Exceptional services to the State and the Crown
- Status: Currently constituted
- Sovereign: King Tupou VI
- Grades: Knight Grand Cross; Grand Cross; Commander; Member

Precedence
- Next (higher): Order of King George Tupou I
- Next (lower): Order of Queen Sālote Tupou III
- Ribbon of the order

The Royal Order of the Crown of Tonga (Tongan: Fakalangilangi 'o Kalauni 'o Tonga) is an Order of Merit awarded for exceptional services to Tonga and the Crown of Tonga. Currently, it is the highest honor that is conferred by the Kingdom of Tonga (with the Royal Order of Pouono being inactive and the Order of King George Tupou I being dormant).

== History ==
It was established 16 April 1913 by George Tupou II to reward those who distinguished themselves by exceptional services to the State and the Crown. The Order was in four classes, and the insignia were designed and manufactured in Germany. The first awards were made in August 1914, to the King, Queen ʻAnaseini Takipō and to F T Goedicke, the Chancellor of the Order. Shortly afterwards word arrived of the outbreak of the First World War, and the king suspended further awards for the duration. The Order was forgotten with Tupou's death in 1918.

It was reorganized on 31 July 2008 by King George Tupou V, in particular relatively to all the classes of merit. It can be awarded to militaries and civilians, native of Tonga or foreigner, without distinction of religion.

== Classes ==
The order is presented in four classes:

- Knight Grand Cross (K.G.C.C.T.) – Collar, Star, Sash, Miniature & Ribbon bar
- Grand Cross (G.C.C.T.) – Star, Sash, Miniature & Ribbon bar
- Commander (C.C.T.) – Necklet, Miniature & Ribbon bar
- Member (M.C.T.) – Breast Badge, Miniature & Ribbon bar

== Insignia ==
The Sash for the two upper classes is a red moiré sash with a white stripe near each edge. Men's sash is 102mm wide (proportions : 2.5/14.5/68/14.5/2.5mm). Women's sash is 75mm wide (proportions : 1.5/10./51/10.5/1.5mm).

=== Knight Grand Cross ===
The Collar is a double gold chain, set with a 6-pointed white enamel gold edged star (centre-piece), with on either side moving upwards; a golden dove in flight, three gold crossed swords, a 6-pointed white enamel gold edged star. Hanging from it, a white enamel Maltese cross with a narrow gold edge, pendant from a gold Tongan crown. The red central medallion has a raised gold Tongan crown, the red riband has a gold legend in capital letters : KO'E 'OTUA MO TONGA KO HOKU TOFI'A. ("God and Tonga Are My Inheritance").

The Knight Grand Cross' Star / Plaque is a silver, silver-gilt & enamel 8-pointed faceted star with the collar-badge (minus the crown), placed in the centre.

Recipients include:

Tonga

- Halaevalu Mataʻaho, The Late Queen Mother of Tonga
- Prince Sione Ngū Manumataongo, The 5th Prince Fatafehi Tuʻipelehake
- The Princess Salote Mafileʻo Pilolevu Tukuʻaho of Tonga, The Princess Royal, The Lady Tuita of ʻUtungake
- The Late Queen Sālote Tupou III
- The Prince Tupoutoʻa ʻUlukalala, The Crown Prince of Tonga
- The Princess Sinaitakala Fakafanua, The Crown Princess of Tonga
- The Prince Viliami Tukuʻaho, The 15th Prince ʻAta of Tonga
- Mataʻiʻulua ʻi Fonuamotu, Lord Fusituʻa

Australia

- Dame Quentin Bryce (Former Governor-General of Australia)
- General Sir Peter Cosgrove (Former Governor-General of Australia)

Bhutan

- The Princess Ashi Sonam Dechen Wangchuck of Bhutan

Japan

- Empress Kōjun
- Emperor Naruhito

New Zealand

- Tūheitia Potatau Te Wherowhero VII, Māori King

Thailand

- The Princess Sirindhorn of Thailand, The Princess Debaratanarajasuda, The Princess Royal

United Kingdom

- Prince Richard, Duke of Gloucester

=== Grand Cross ===
The Grand Cross' Star is a silver 8-pointed faceted star, with the collar-badge (minus the crown), placed in the centre.

- Simon Arthur, 4th Baron Glenarthur
- Birgitte, Duchess of Gloucester

=== Commander ===
The Commander’s Necklet Badge is a white badge with a gold crown worn from the neck on a ribbon, approx. 41mm wide, red with two white stripes near the edge (approximative proportions 1/5.5/28/5.5/1 mm). Recipients include:

- Stephen Brady
- Elizabeth Wood-Ellem

=== Member ===
The Member’s Badge is a breast badge (smaller than Commander's) worn from a similar 36mm ribbon (approximative proportions 6/6/12/6/6mm).
