= Tongaleva Luani =

Tongan politician (died 1987)

Member of the Legislative Assembly
- In office 1957–1978
- Constituency: Vavaʻu Nobles

Personal details
- Died: 24 January 1987 (aged 57) Nukuʻalofa, Tonga

Lord Tongaleva Luani (died 24 January 1987) was a Tongan noble and politician. He served as a member of the Legislative Assembly between 1957 and 1978.

== Biography ==
Luani was educated at 'Apifo'ou College and Tupou College and later became president of the Catholic Schools Ex-Students Association. He was a lay preacher in the Free Wesleyan Church and a sports official, serving as president of the Tonga Amateur and Professional Boxing Association and vice president of the Tonga Amateur Sports Association.

In 1957 he was elected to the Legislative Assembly as one of the seven representatives of nobles. He remained a member until 1978.

He died at his home in the Kolofoʻou district of Nukuʻalofa in January 1987 after suffering a heart attack. His son Sione later also served as an MP.
