= Order of King George Tupou I =

Royal Order of King George Tupou I Ko e Fakalangilangi ‘o Kingi Sia’osi Topou I

Awarded by King of Tonga
- Type: Order
- Established: Between 1876 & 1890
- Royal house: House of Tupou
- Awarded for: The King of Tonga and Heads of State
- Status: Constituted but dormant
- Sovereign: King Tupou VI
- Grades: Knight Grand Cross
- Former grades: Knight Commander; Companion

Precedence
- Next (higher): Royal Order of Pouono
- Next (lower): Order of the Crown of Tonga
- Ribbon of the order

The Royal Order of King George Tupou I is a knighthood order of the Kingdom of Tonga.

== History ==
The Order was established between 1876 and 1890 by King George Tupou I as a general reward for meritorious services to the kingdom.

== Classes ==
The Order consists of three classes:

- Knight Grand Cross - Star & badge from a sash
- Knight Commander - Star, badge from a necklet ribbon
- Commander - Breast badge from a ribbon

The post-nominal letters of the three classes (from highest to lowest) are respectively K.G.C.G.T., K.C.G.T. and C.G.T.

In 2008 King George Tupou V declared the classes of Knight Commander and Commander obsolete.

== Insignia ==
=== Knight Grand Cross ===
The Star is a 90mm 8-pointed silver, silver-gilt & enamel faceted Star with four silver Tongan crowns on the main points, (in the North, South, East & West). The white enamel central medallion has the national coat of arms in the centre, the red riband has the gold capital letters KOE 'OTUA MO TOGA KO HOKU TOFi'A. (the wrongly spelt motto due to a manufacturing error – "God and Tonga Are My Inheritance"), there is a small 5-pointed gold star in the base of the riband (reversed, i.e. one point downwards).

The ribbon is a 102mm red moiré sash is with two white stripes (18/22.5/21/22.5/18mm)

=== Knight Commander ===
The star (approx. 90mm) is a 7-pointed silver, silver-gilt & enamel faceted Star (with one point downwards), on top of the riband is a gilt crown. The central medallion & riband are as above.

The necklet badge (approx 60mm without the crown) is a silver, silver-gilt & enamel 6-pointed faceted star with two points upwards, suspended by a silver-gilt Tongan crown. The central medallion & riband are as above.

The necklet ribbon is approx. 41mm wide, red with three white stripes (2.5/6/9/6/9/6/2.5mm)

=== Companion ===
The breast badge is a similar faceted star as the Knight Commander (above) except that the white central medallion has the shield from the coat of arms in the centre.

The breast ribbon is approx 38mm wide, red with two white stripes (6/8/10/8/6mm)
