= Royal Order of the Phoenix (Tonga) =

Order of knighthood of the Kingdom of Tonga

Royal Order of the Phoenix Ko e Fakalangilangi 'o e Finiki

Awarded by King of Tonga
- Type: Order
- Royal house: House of Tupou
- Status: Constituted
- Grand Master: Tupou VI
- Grades: Grand Cross (GCOP)

Precedence
- Next (higher): Royal Military Order of St. George
- Next (lower): King George Tupou V Royal Family Order
- Ribbon of the order

The Royal Order of the Phoenix is an order of knighthood of the Kingdom of Tonga.

== History ==
The order was founded by King George Tupou V on 1 August 2010.

Order of the Phoenix of Rawaki Island

== Classes ==
The Order is awarded in one single class : Grand Cross (G.C.O.P.)

== Insignia ==
The Ribbon is orange.
