= Royal Order of Pouono =

Royal Order of Pouono Ko e Fakalangilangi ‘o Pouono

Awarded by King of Tonga
- Type: Order of Merit
- Established: 1893
- Royal house: House of Tupou
- Awarded for: The Monarch, Consort, and children of the Monarch of Tonga and also foreign Heads of State
- Status: Inactive since ca. 2008
- Sovereign: King Tupou VI
- Grades: Knight Grand Cross (KGCP)

Precedence
- Next (higher): None
- Next (lower): Order of King George Tupou I
- Ribbon of the order

The Royal Order of Pouono is the highest order of chivalry in the Kingdom of Tonga.

== History ==
The Order was established in 1893 by King George Tupou II. The Order of Pouono is currently considered as inactive, as King George Tupou V discontinued the Order in 2008.

== Class ==
The Order consists of a single class: Knight Grand Cross. Its post-nominal letters are K.G.C.P.

== Insignia ==
The insignia consists of a collar, badge, breast star and riband. The collar is reserved for the King and foreign Heads of State only.

- The badge is a white enamel gold edged Maltese cross. Its gold central disc displays the "Pouono fale" (a six posted house) also in gold, and is surrounded by a red enamel ring bearing the national motto "KO E ‘OTUA TONGA KO HOKU TOFI’A" (sometimes written as "KOE OTUA MOTOGA KO HOKU TOFIA" due to a manufacturing error) in gold capital letters, in the base is a spray of gold laurel. The badge is suspended via a gold Tongan crown from the collar and ribbon.
- The star is gold 7-armed cross, with each arm having seven finger-rays (the first & seventh being the same length, the second & sixth being smaller than the first, the third & fifth being smaller than the others, and the fourth being the smallest ray). Its white enamel central disc shows a gold "Pouono beach cottage", which is surrounded by a red enamel ring bearing the national motto in gold capital letters and a spray of gold laurel in the base.
- The collar of the Order is a double gold chain set with a white enamel 6-pointed gold edged star (centre-piece), with on either side moving upwards; a white enamel dove in flight, three crossed swords in gold, a 6-pointed white enamel & gold edged star. From it hangs the badge of the Order.
- The riband is a 102mm-wide sash with a moiré pattern and alternating scarlet, light cream, scarlet, light cream and scarlet colored stripes (proportions 6/20/50/20/6 mm). The badge is worn suspended from the riband at the left hip.
