= Molitoni Finau =

Tongan politician

Member of the Legislative Assembly
- In office 1919–1965

Personal details
- Born: 22 March 1883; Nukuʻalofa, Tonga
- Died: 1 December 1965 (aged 82); Nukuʻalofa, Tonga

Molitoni Fisilihoi "Moulton" Finau (22 March 1883 – 1 December 1965) was a Tongan politician. He served as a member of the Legislative Assembly from 1919 until his death, becoming Tonga's longest serving MP.

== Biography ==
Finau was born in Nukuʻalofa in March 1883, the son of Methodist preacher David Finau, who translated the bible into Tongan. He was educated at Newington College in Sydney between 1896 and 1901, where he was known by the anglicised name Moulton, but was also nicknamed Dave. He excelled at sport, representing the first team of the school at cricket, rifle shooting and rugby, becoming the first pupil to be awarded triple colours in 1899. The following year he was part of the cricket and rugby teams that won their respective championships in 1900. He finished his education at Tupou College in Tongatapu, with his final matriculation score of 95% unsurpassed until his death. He joined the civil service in 1905, initially worked in the Lands Department, before joining the Police Department in 1915 and becoming an inspector three years later. He was also a significant figure in the Free Wesleyan Church.

He resigned from the civil service in 1919 to contest the general elections and was elected to the Legislative Assembly. In the same year he also passed the Tongan law exams and began practising as a lawyer, later becoming a founder member of the Tongan Law Society.

Finau died at Vaiola Hospital in Nukuʻalofa in December 1965. Two of his children, Lupeti and Tomiteau, later became MPs.
