= Vavaʻu =

Island group of Tonga

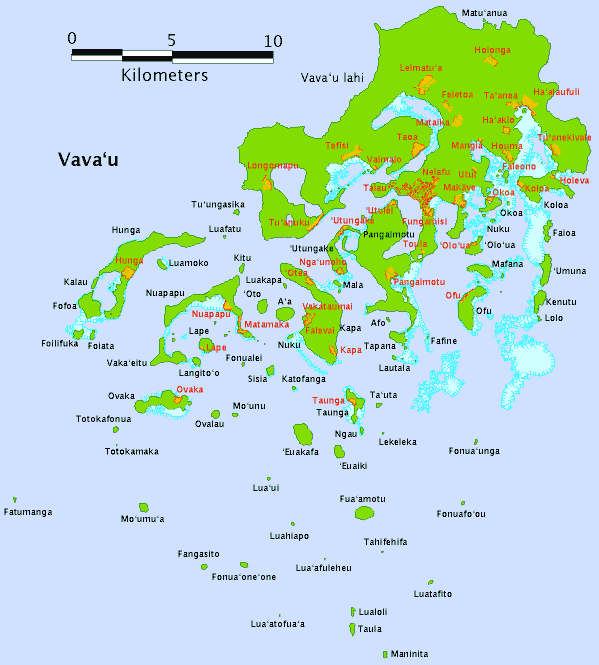
- Map of Vavaʻu.

Geography
- Location: Pacific Ocean
- Coordinates: 18°39′05″S 173°59′01″W
- Archipelago: Tonga Islands
- Total islands: 55
- Major islands: 1
- Area: 138 km^{2} (53 sq mi)
- Highest elevation: 131 m (430 ft)
- Highest point: Mount Talau

Administration
- Tonga
- Largest settlement: Neiafu (pop. 3,731)

Demographics
- Population: 14,283 (2021)
- Pop. density: 108.1/km^{2} (280/sq mi)
- Ethnic groups: Tongan (majority), European, Chinese, Pacific Islanders.

Location of Vavaʻu District in Tonga

Vavaʻu is an island group, consisting of one large island (ʻUtu Vavaʻu) and 40 smaller ones, in Tonga. It is part of Vavaʻu District, which includes several other individual islands. Vavaʻu rises 204 m (669 ft) above sea level at Mount Talau. The capital is Neiafu, situated at the Port of Refuge (Puatalefusi or Lolo-ʻa-Halaevalu).

== History ==
=== Myths and legends ===
In Polynesia, it is said that the islands were created by the god Maui, who reached into the bottom of the sea with his magic hook, caught something on it, and pulled it up to the sea surface, and it became the islands of Vavaʻu.

=== Recorded history ===
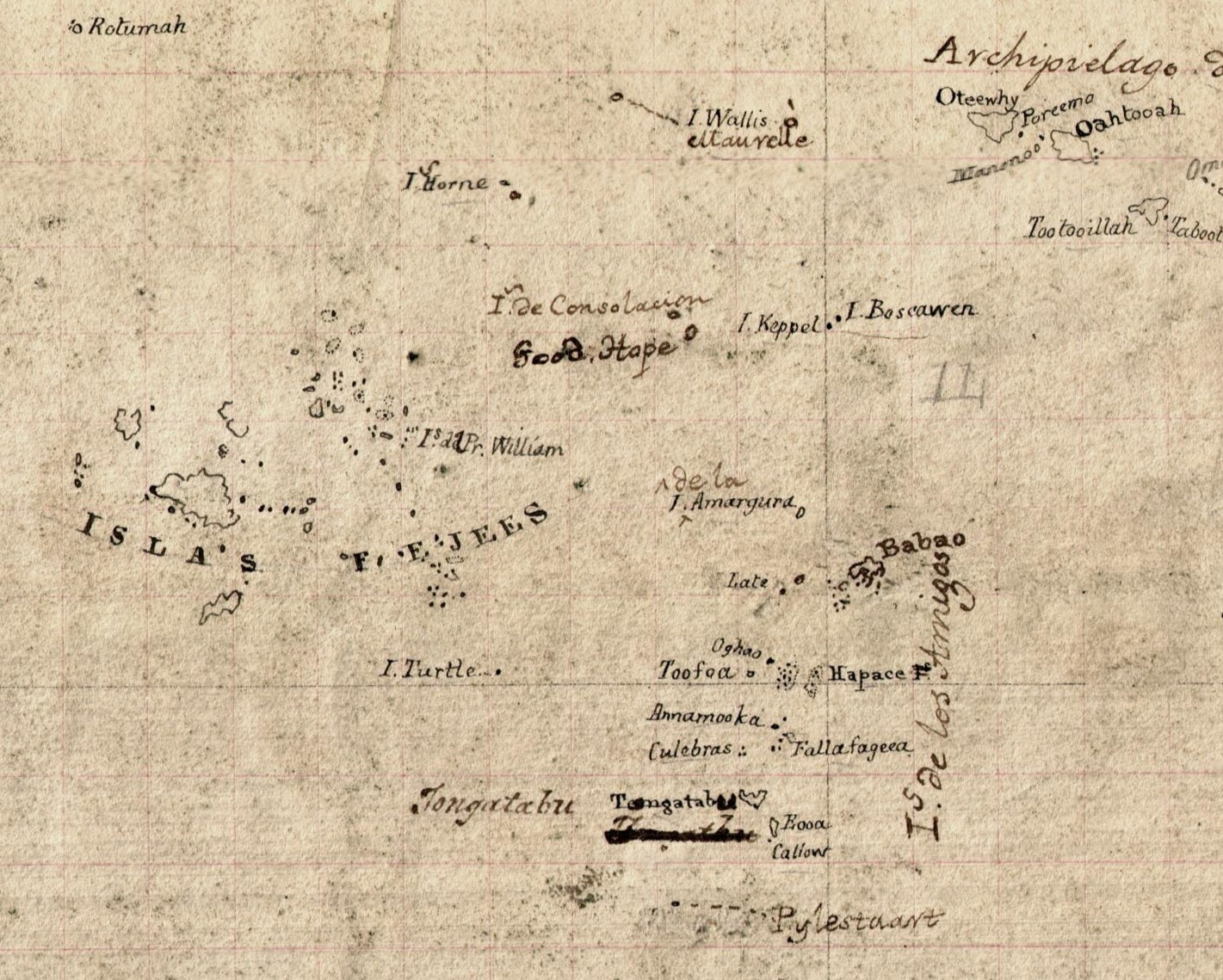
Babao, Isla de los Amigos

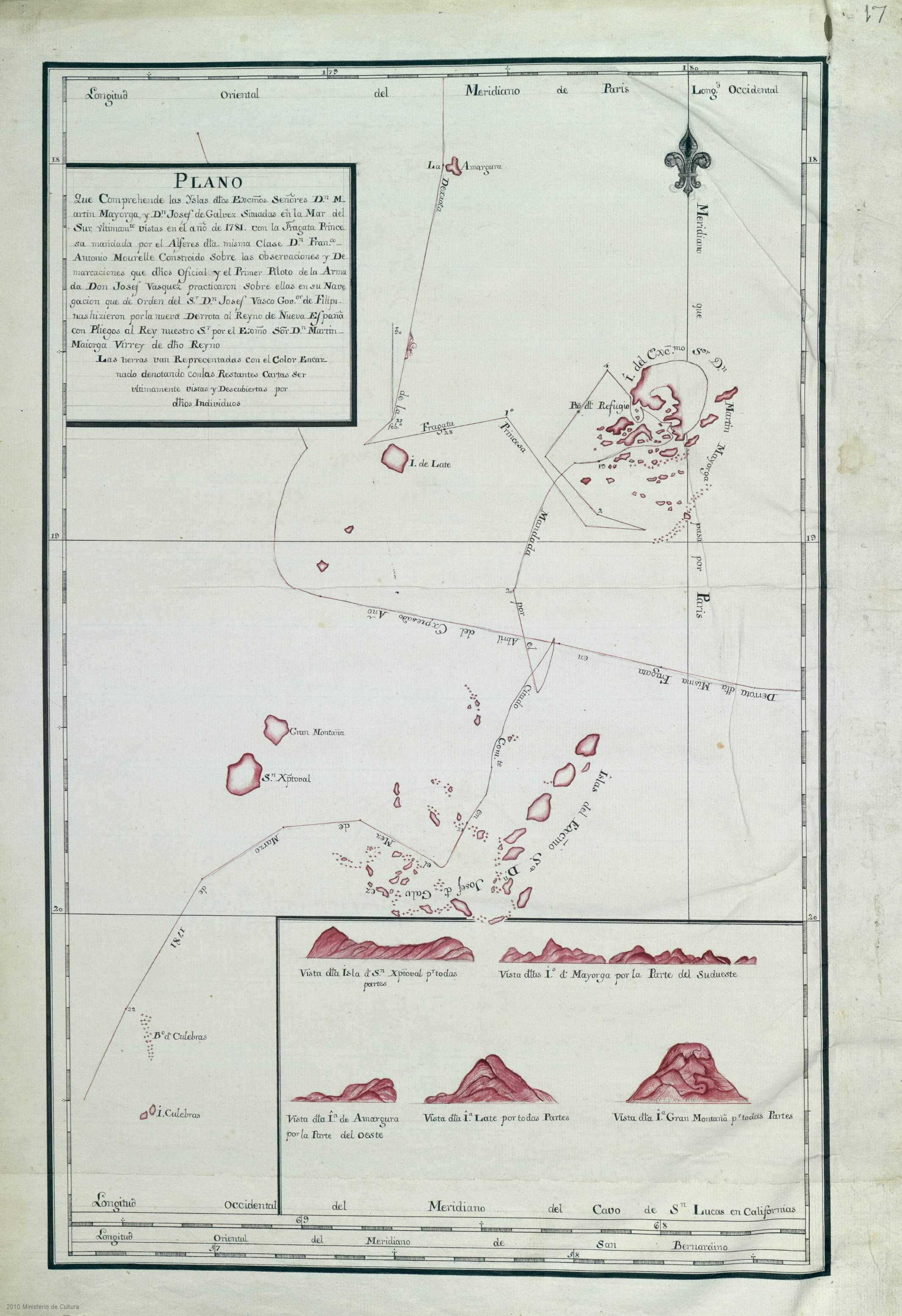
Plano que Comprehende las Yslas dlos. Excmos. Señores Dn. Martin Mayorga y Dn Josef de Galvez Situadas en la Mar del Sur : ultimamte. vistas en el año de 1781 con la Fragata Princesa

Don Francisco Mourelle de la Rúa, commanding the Spanish frigate Princesa, was the first European to come to Vavaʻu, which he did on 4 March 1781. He charted Vavaʻu as Martín de Mayorga, naming it after the incumbent Viceroy of New Spain. Captain James Cook had known about the islands a decade earlier, but the people in Haʻapai had told him it would be no good for him to go there; they told him there was no harbour. They may have told him this to dissuade him from going there; but Cook heeded their advice.

As it turned out, Mourelle found excellent anchoring, in Vavaʻu, which he desperately needed, because he had failed to find a harbour at the last two places he had tried to land, Fonualei (Bitterness island) and Late. He gave the harbour at Vavaʻu the name Port of Refuge, although his original port of refuge had been the bay on the west coast of the main island, near Longomapu.

Twelve years later, in 1793, the Malaspina Expedition visited the area for a month, following up on Mourelle's investigations, and formally claiming the islands for Spain.

Whaling vessels were among the first regular Western visitors to the islands. The first on record was the Fanny, on 17 June 1823, and the last was the Robert Morrison, from July through September, 1883. These vessels came for water, food, and wood - and sometimes they recruited islanders to serve as crewmen on their ships. They stimulated commerce and were significant agents for change on the islands.

In 1839, the Tuʻi Tonga (chief), George Tupou I, instituted the Vavaʻu Code in Vavaʻu.

== Geography ==
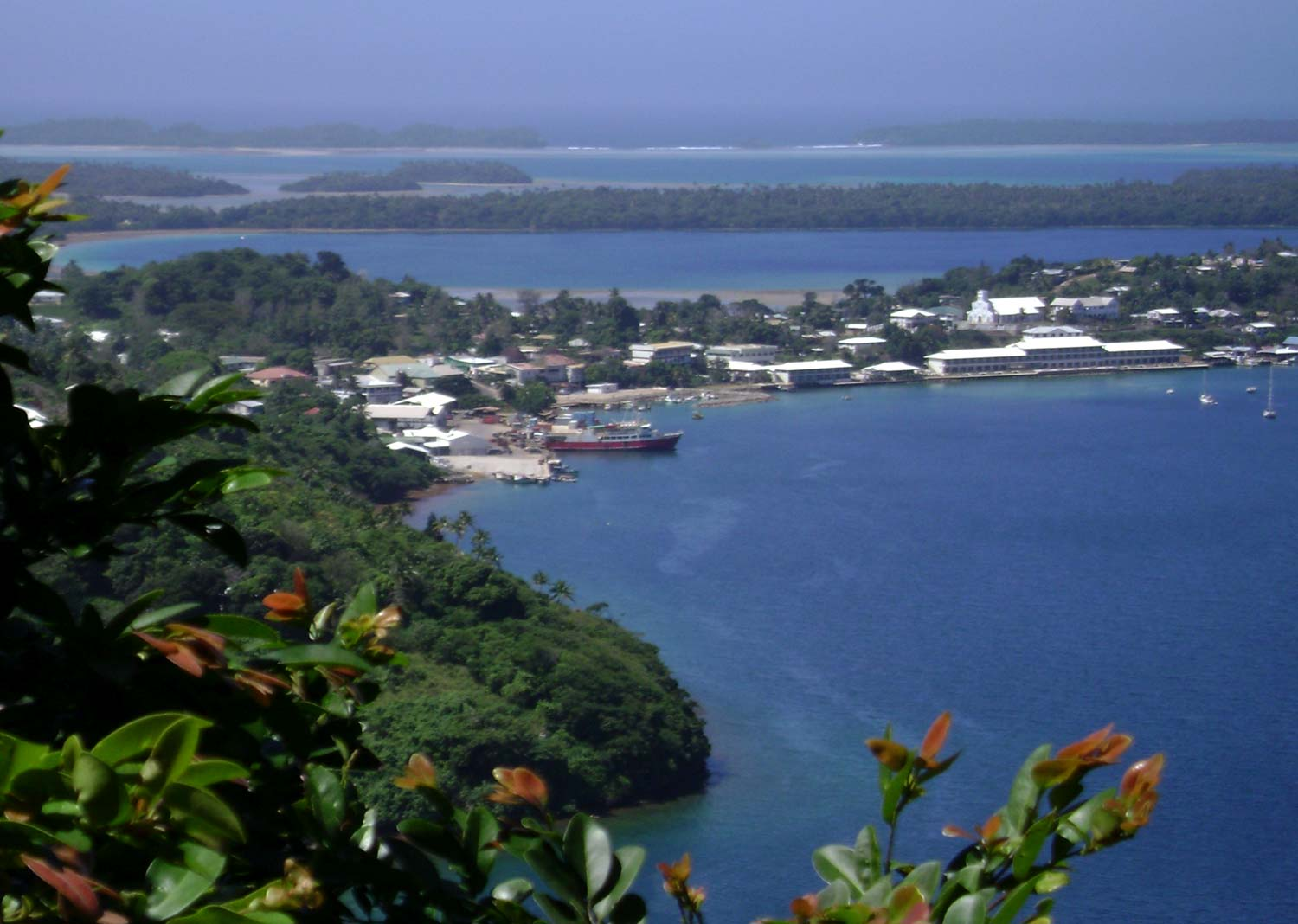
Neiafu (left) and Fungamisi (centre) at the Port of Refuge

Location of Vavaʻu in the Pacific Ocean

The Vavaʻu island group is spread out across an area that measures about 21 km from east to west and 25 km from north to south. Vavaʻu had 13,738 inhabitants at the 2016 census, 5,251 of whom lived in the capital, Neiafu. The islands in Vavaʻu District, outside of the Vavaʻu Group, are uninhabited. The main island of ’Utu Vava’u, at 97 km^{2} (37 sq mi), is the second largest island in Tonga.

Vavaʻu is a coral reef with cliffs in the north rising to 200 m (660 ft) above sea level. On the south side, the island group is dispersed into many small, scattered islands and waterways. The largest of the waterways, the fjord-like Ava Pulepulekai channel, extends 11 km (6.8 mi) inland from the harbor of Neiafu (the capital).

The north coast of ’Utu Vava’u island is a raised platform of coral cliffs. The southern coastline is low and irregular, and opens out into a network of channels, bays, and islets, forming one of the best-protected natural harbors in the Pacific.

’Utu Vava’u is also home to the ʻEneʻio Botanical Garden, which is Tonga's only botanical garden.

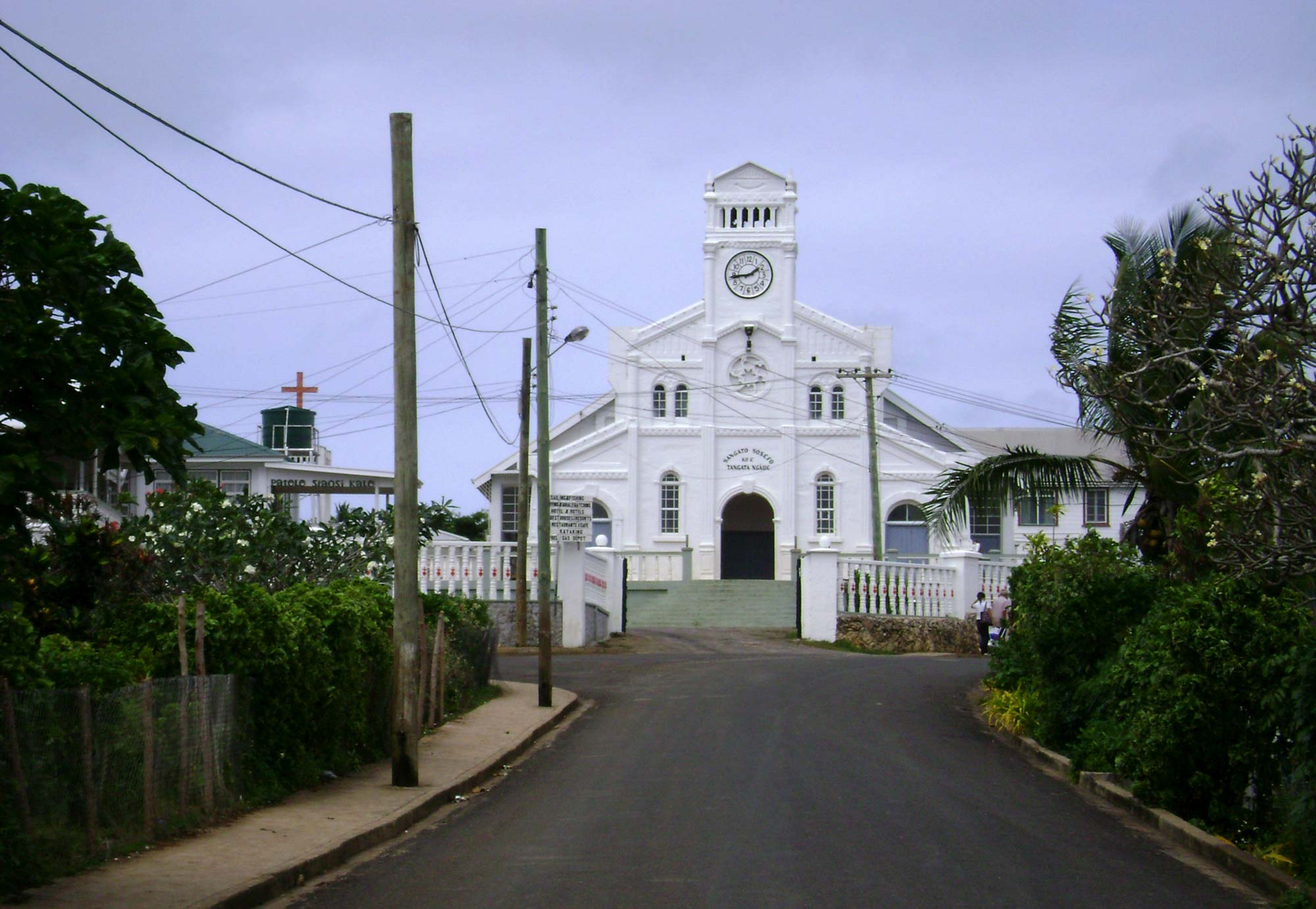
Neiafu church

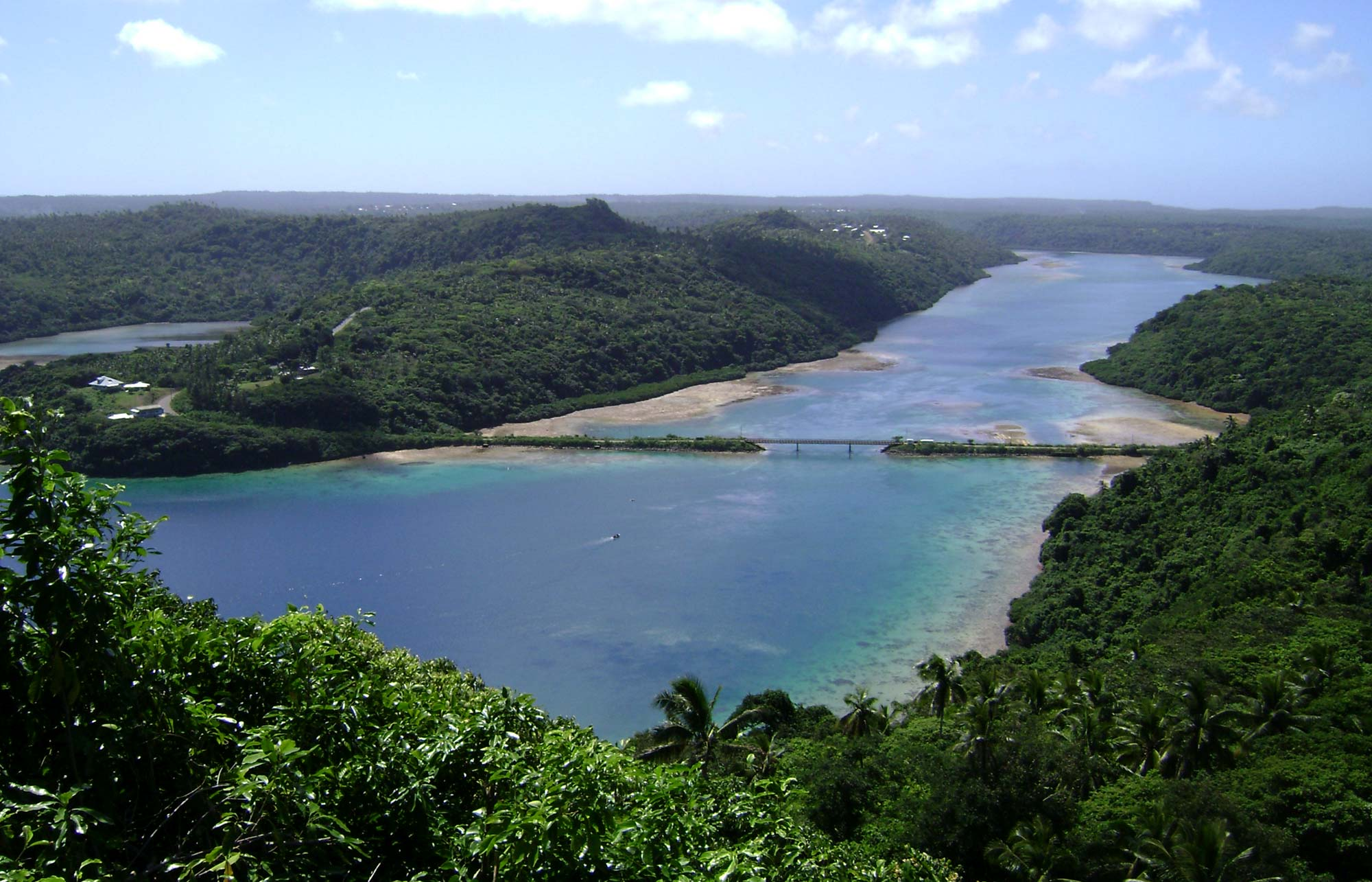
Vaipūua bridge

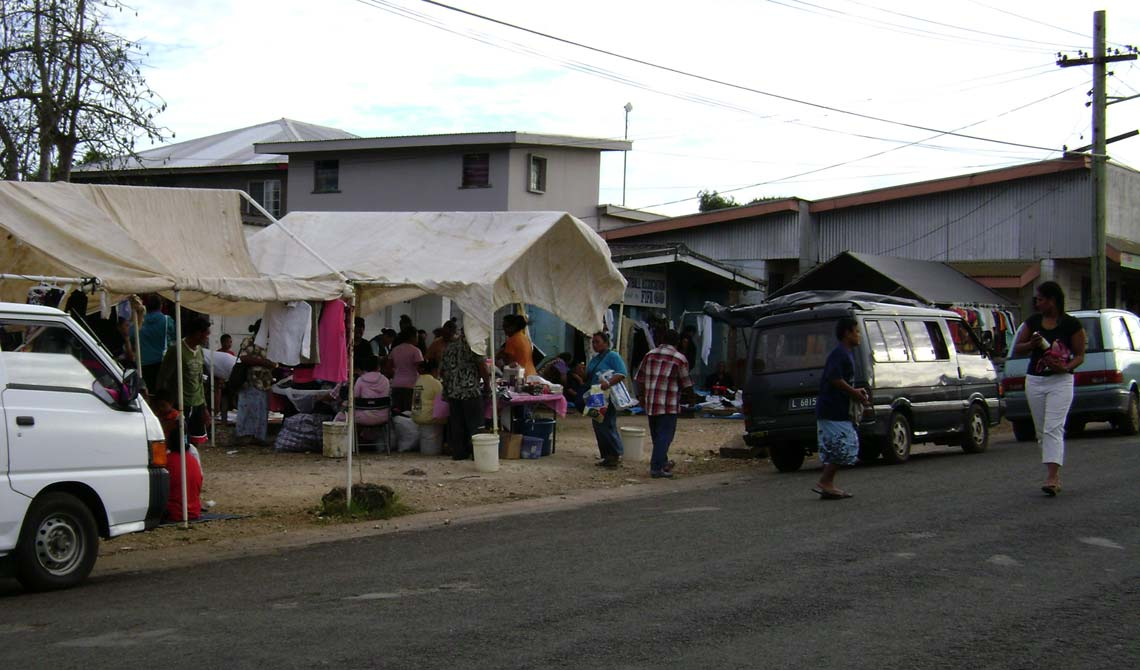
Neiafu Market

=== Climate ===
Vavaʻu's climate is by far the warmest in Tonga (apart from the Niuas, which are the northernmost islands in the kingdom). Its warm climate and fertile soil makes it a haven for growers of vanilla, pineapple, and other tropical fruits.

== Governors ==
- Lord Fakatulolo was appointed Governor of Vavaʻu in 2018.
- David Fulivai was appointed governor of Vavaʻu in July 2011.
- Sione Laumanuʻuli Luani was governor until he died suddenly on 12 May 2010.
- Samisoni Fonomanu Tu'i'afitu was appointed acting governor of Vavaʻu in 1988, and then governor in 1991. He died on 4 October 2005.
- Siosaia Aleamotuʻa Laufilitonga Tuita was governor from 1957 to 1962 or later
- Fatafehi Tuʻipelehake was governor from 1952 until 1957.
- ʻAkauʻola Siosateki Tonga Veikune Faletau was governor from 1936 to 1939, before becoming the minister of police, a post he held from 1939 until 1952.
- Viliami Tungī Mailefihi was governor from 1912 to 1918.

Historical population
Year	Pop.	±%
1976	15,068	—
1986	15,175	+0.7%
1996	15,715	+3.6%
2006	15,505	−1.3%
2011	14,922	−3.8%
2016	13,738	−7.9%
2021	14,283	+4.0%

== Economy ==
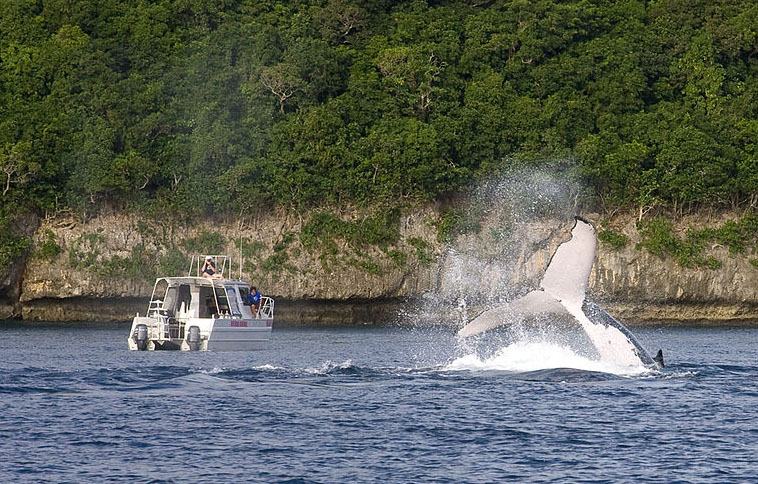
Whale watching in Vavaʻu

Vavaʻu is popular with sailors and other tourists, because of its scenery. It is one of the most visited tourism sites in Tonga. From May to October, the Port of ’Utu Vava’u attracts sailing boats from elsewhere in the world and arranges for tourists to dive with humpback whales and explore underwater caves. The island is served by Vavaʻu International Airport.

Tourism, agriculture, and fishing are the main sources of income for the inhabitants. The vanilla beans grown here are considered among the best in the world. Giant clams are farmed, and pearls are cultured.

Vavaʻu is also a sport fishing destination, including for sailfish.

== Ecology ==
Vavaʻu is home to 262 species of plants, 11 species of lizard, 38 species of bird, and 41 species of terrestrial snail.

== Notable people ==
- Lisiate ʻAkolo, former finance minister
- Jabez Bryce, first Pacific Islander Anglican bishop
- ʻAna Kata Nau, first Tongan woman attorney
- Viliami Latu, trade minister
- Silva McLeod, Tonga's first woman pilot
- Meleane Pau'uvale, Tongan culture and language activist in New Zealand
- Saia Piukala, minister of health
- Viliami Tangi, former deputy prime minister
- Tonga Tuʻiʻafitu, lands minister
- George Tupou II, former king of Tonga
- Samiu Vaipulu, trade minister
- Paea Wolfgramm, boxer

== See also ==
- 2006 Tonga earthquake
