= Monuments of Tonga =

The Kingdom of Tonga has a number of historical monuments, linked to the chiefly dynasties which ruled over the islands for centuries.

In 2007, Tonga submitted several of these monuments collectively for consideration as a potential UNESCO World Heritage Site. They were to be considered as "the Ancient Capitals of the Kingdom of Tonga", covering the Haʻamonga 'a Maui Historical Park (including the Haʻamonga 'a Maui itself and the Maka Faʻakinanga slab) and the royal tombs (langi) in Muʻa. Heketa, included in the Park, was the country's capital from the 10th to the 13th century, while Muʻa was the capital from the 13th to the 19th century.

== Megaliths ==
Arguably Tonga's most famous monument is the Haʻamonga ʻa Maui, a six-metre-tall (20 ft) trilithon consisting in three coral slabs (two holding up the third as a crosspiece), located in the east of Tongatapu (the country's main island), "near the villages of Niutoua and Afa". It is thought to have been erected around the year 1200, under the reign of Tuʻi Tuʻitatui. Its name means "Maui's burden", in reference to the legend whereby Maui fished up the Tongan islands from the sea depths. Its purpose remains uncertain. It is thought it may have been a "gateway" of sorts to the palace in Heketa. Another legend says that Tuʻitatui had the monument built to represent his two sons, Lafa and Talaihaʻapepe, "with the lintel uniting the columns symbolizing the bonds of brotherhood" to urge them to remain united and to maintain peaceful brotherly relations after his death. The Tongan monarchy today states that the Haʻamonga ʻa Maui was "an early style sundial clock that recorded different seasonal changes". Since 1972, the site around the monument has been protected as the Haʻamonga ʻa Maui Historical Park.

About a hundred metres away from the Haʻamonga ʻa Maui is the Maka Faʻakinanga, an upright stone slab "with markings on the front resembling an indentation of a large head, shoulders and back". Oral history has it that the slab "served as the King's throne" at the time of Tuʻitatui. "It is said that the King sat here alertly to ward off assassination attempts on his life."

== Royal tombs ==
There are twenty-two to twenty-eight langi (royal tombs) in or near Lapaha, in Muʻa, in the east of Tongatapu. The tombs are stone vaults, "platforms of earth with a stepped pyramid effect supported by carefully placed retaining walls". The earliest person to have been buried there is thought to be Fatafehi, daughter of Tuʻi Tuʻitatui; the earliest tombs have been tentatively dated back to the mid-thirteenth century. There are also a number of other langi in other parts of the country, notably in Vavaʻu and Haʻapai.

The "grandest" of Muʻa's langi is Paepae o Teleʻa ("Teleʻa's mound"), "impressive in its engineering and joinery, with eight-foot wide coral slabs neatly fitted one end to the next". It is named for Tuʻi ʻUluakimata I, also known as Teleʻa, who is thought to have had it built for himself in the 16th century. He was never buried there, however, as he died during a visit to Samoa in an attempt to recover the body of his Samoan-born wife, Talafiava. He is thought to have been buried in Manuʻa, Samoa, and the Paepae o Teleʻa has remained empty. Beside it is a smaller langi, Namoʻala, which was built for an unknown person but wherein now lie (since 2006) the bodies of Prince ʻ Uluvalu Tuʻipelehake and his wife Kaimana Aleamotuʻa.

Monarchs of the current dynasty, the House of Tupou, are buried at Malaʻekula ("Red Ground"), in a park in the centre of Nukuʻalofa, the current capital. Malaʻekula became a burial ground following the death of King George Tupou I, the founder of the modern Kingdom of Tonga, in 1893. It is not an langi, but an elaborate "modern" burial monument in white stone.

== Royal Palace ==
The Royal Palace, made of kauri wood and located in the heart of Nukuʻalofa, was built in 1864 for King George Tupou I. It remains the residence of the royal family.

== Other monuments ==
There is an "ancient fortress" in Haʻapai, and a bronze statue of Shirley Waldemar Baker, also in Haʻapai.

== Images ==
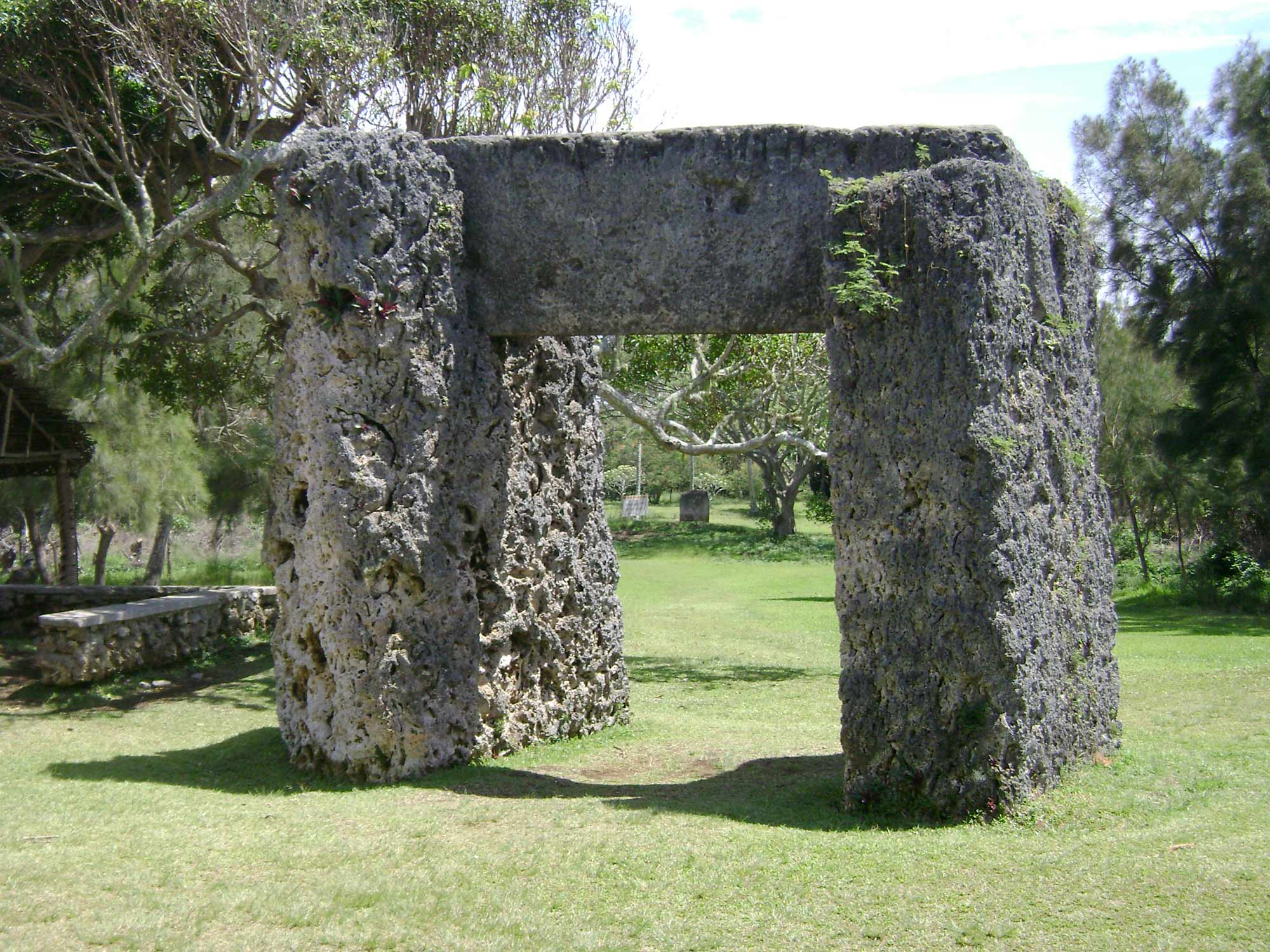
The Haʻamonga ʻa Maui

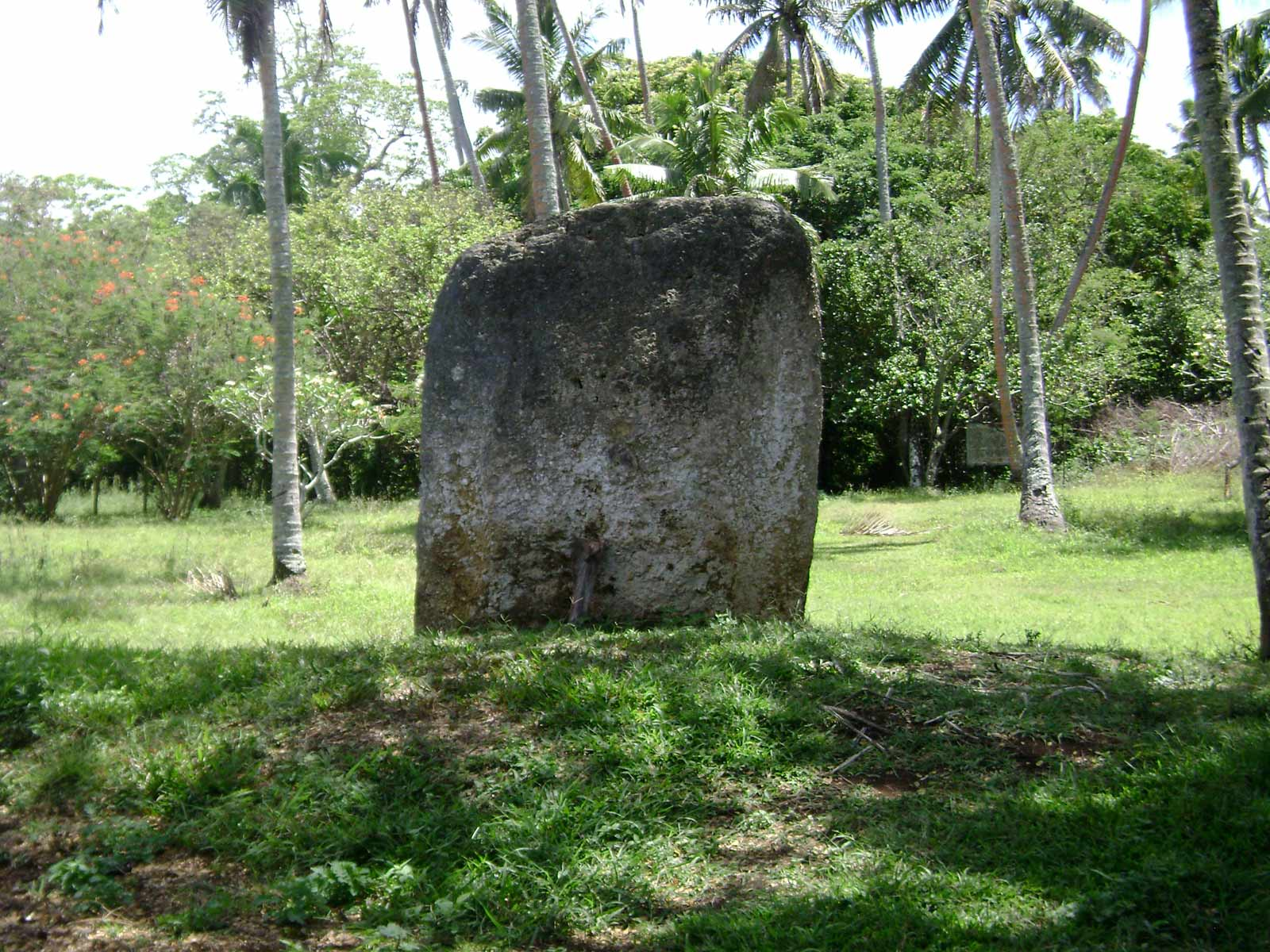
The Maka Faʻakinanga

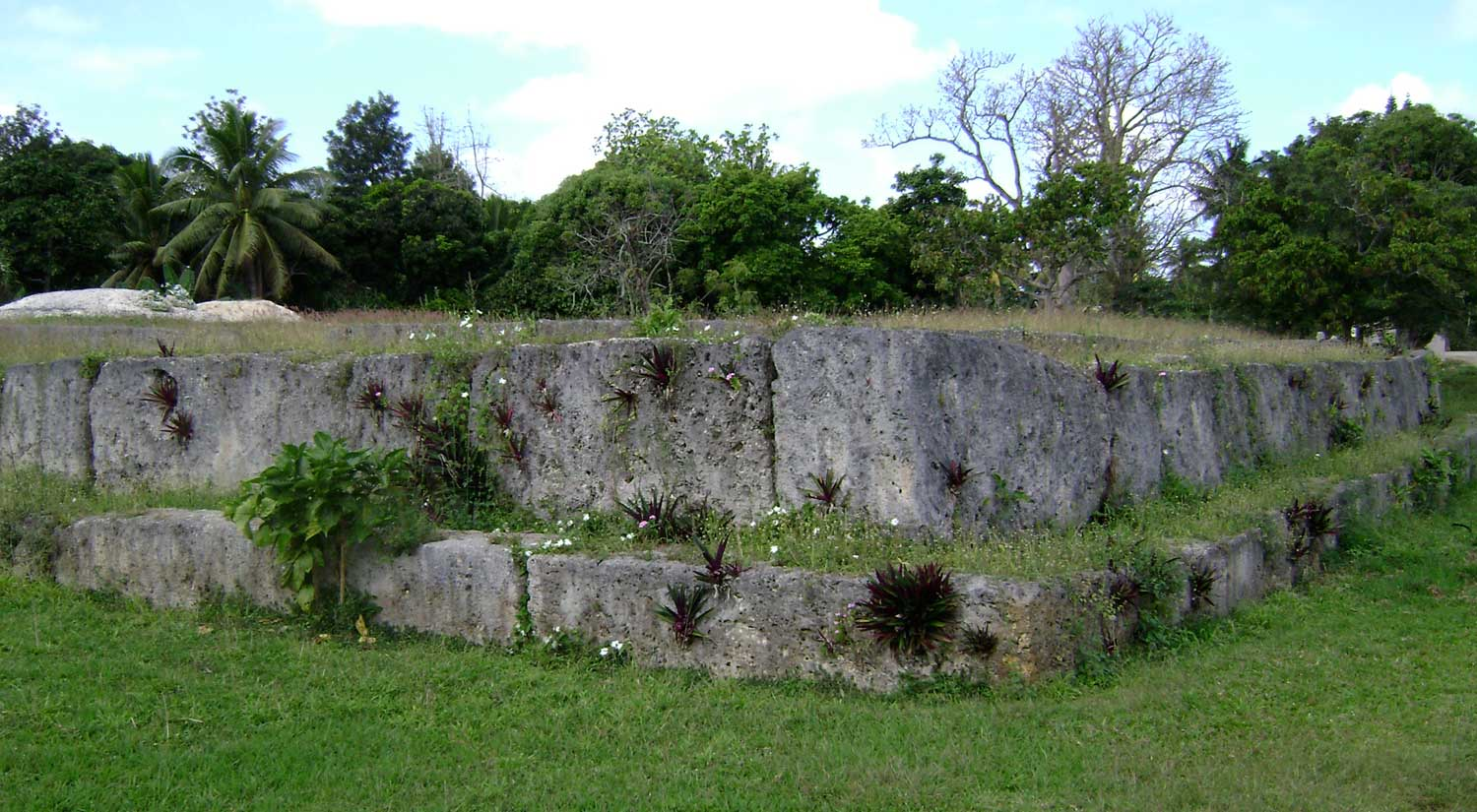
The Paepae ʻo Teleʻa langi

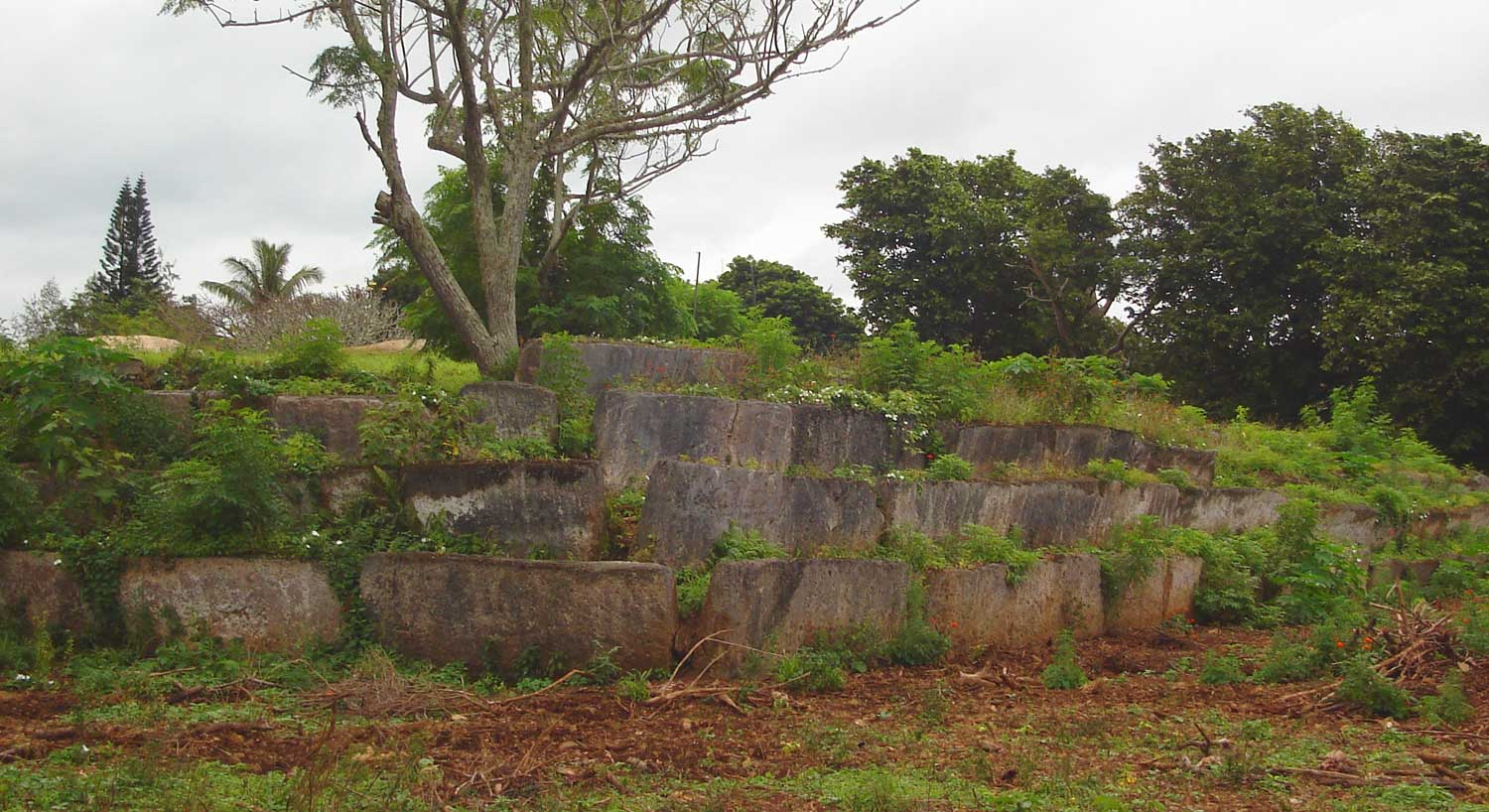
The Tau‘atonga langi

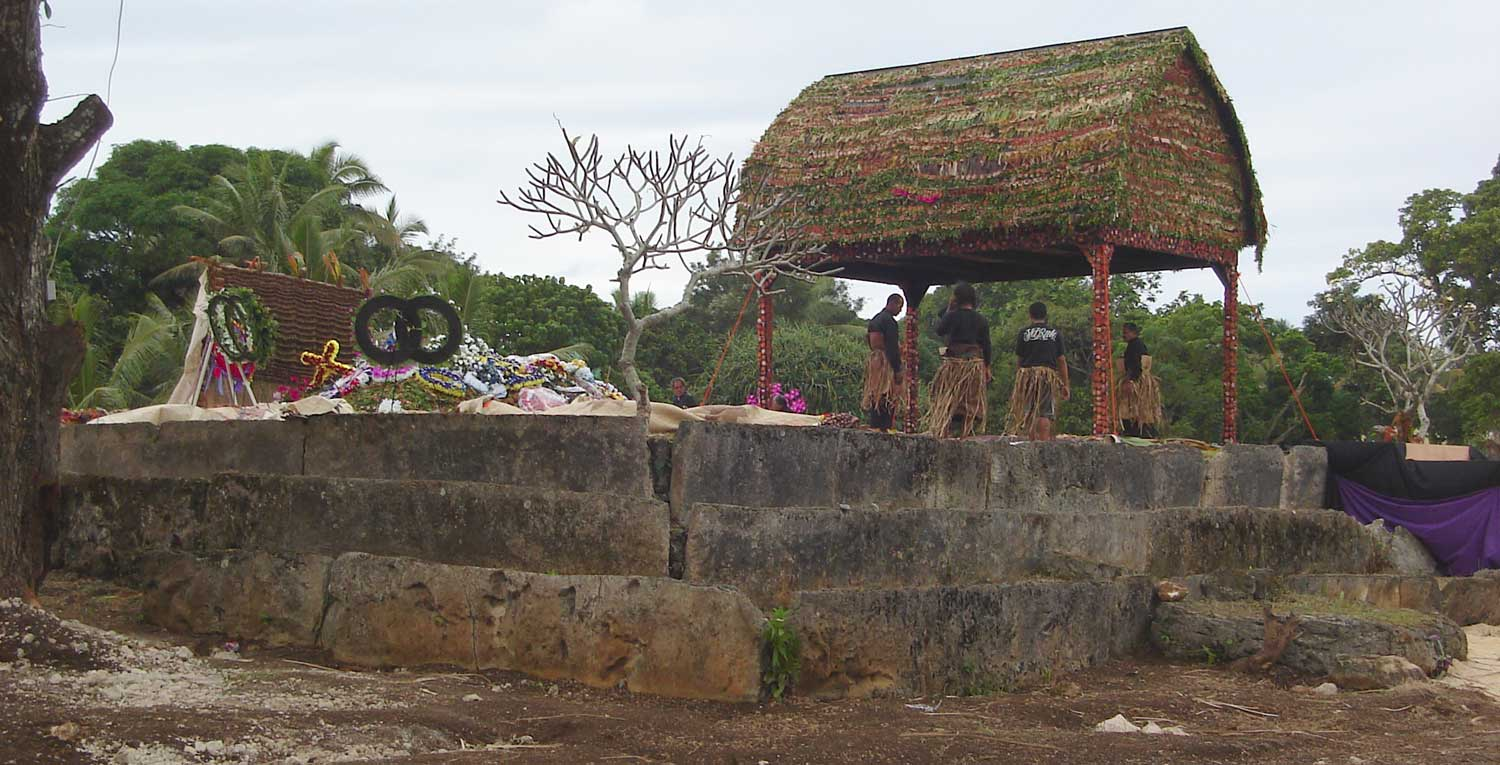
The Namoʻala langi, following the burial of Prince Tuʻipelehake and his wife.

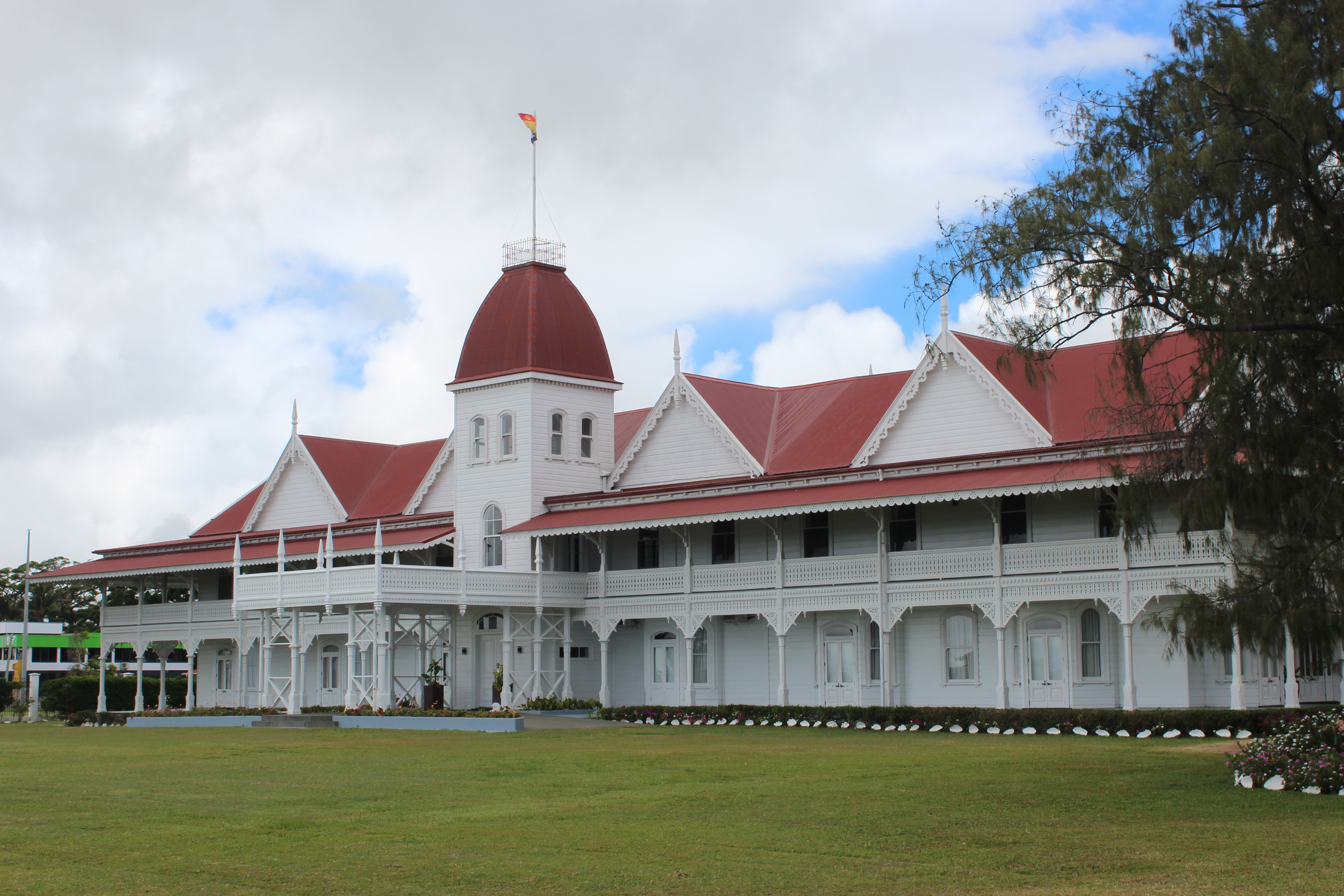
The Royal Palace
