= Timeline of Tongan history =

This is a timeline of Tongan history, comprising important legal and territorial changes and political events in Tonga and its predecessor states. To read about the background to these events, see History of Tonga. See also the list of monarchs of Tonga and list of prime ministers of Tonga.

== Before 1st century ==
Year	Date	Event
1200 BC		The first Lapita settlers arrived in Tonga.

== 1st to 10th centuries ==
Year	Date	Event
200		Explorers set out from Tonga, Samoa and Fiji to discover and settle eastern Polynesia.
950		First named ruler of Tonga: 'Aho'eitu

== 11th century ==
Year	Date	Event
1100		The Empire expanded under Tuʻi Tonga Momo to include Samoa and parts of Fiji.

== 12th century ==
Year	Date	Event
1200		Muʻa became the capital of the Tongan Empire.

== 13th century ==
Year	Date	Event
1250		Samoa rebelled and cast off Tongan rule, establishing the Malietoa dynasty in Samoa and marking the beginning of the Empire's decline.
1300		The Ha'amonga 'a Maui was built during the rule of Tuʻi Tonga Tu'itatui.

== 14th century ==
13-14 century soma defeats tu'tonga

== 15th century ==
Year	Date	Event
1470		The Tongans were driven out of Wallis and Futuna. Tuʻi Tonga Kauʻulufonua I ceded temporal authority to his brother Moʻungāmotuʻa, replacing the Tuʻi Tonga dynasty with the Tu'i Ha'atakalaua dynasty.

== 16th century ==
Year	Date	Event
1600		The Tuʻi Kanokupolu dynasty ascended.

== 17th century ==
Year	Date	Event
1616	April	Willem Schouten and Jacob Le Maire visited the Niuas
1643	January	Abel Tasman visited Tongatapu and Haʻapai.
1650		Mataelehaʻamea, the Tu'i Kanokupolu, established the supremacy of his dynasty after a war against the Tuʻi Haʻatakalaua, Vaea.

== 18th century ==
Year	Date	Event
1773		Captain James Cook first visited Tonga and referred to it as the "Friendly Islands".
1774		Cook returned.
1777		Cook met the Tu'i Kanokupolu, Tuʻihalafatai, on his third visit.
1782		Tuʻihalafatai renounced power and moved to Fiji.
1793		Tupoumoheofo, the first woman to hold the title Tu'i Kanokupolu, was overthrown by her cousin Tukuʻaho.
1797		The first Christian missionaries arrived from London.

== 19th century ==
Year	Date	Event
1806		William Mariner began a sojourn in Tonga.
1808		Tupoumālohi was appointed Tu'i Kanokupolu after a nine-year interregnum.
1810		Mariner's sojourn ended.
1820		Aleamotu'a took the throne as Tu'i Kanokupolu amidst ongoing conflict.
1826		Aleamotu'a converted to Christianity and allowed Wesleyan missionaries to settle on Tongatapu.
1831		Tāufaʻāhau I proclaimed himself King George Tupou I.
1839		First written law in Tonga in the form of the Vavaʻu Code. Later revised in 1850
1845		George Tupou completed his conquest and unification of Tonga and moved the capital to Nukuʻalofa.
1860		Shirley Waldemar Baker arrived in Tonga as a missionary
1875		George Tupou I declared Tonga a constitutional monarchy, emancipated all serfs and guaranteed freedom of the press and the rule of law.
1880	April	Shirley Waldemar Baker became prime minister to George Tupou I
1893	18 February	George Tupou I died and was succeeded as king by George Tupou II.
1900		A Treaty of Friendship was signed under which Tonga becomes a self-governing British protectorate.
1900	13 March	Future Queen Sālote Tupou III is born.
1901		Treaty of Friendship is ratified.

== 20th century ==
Year	Date	Event
1918	5 April	George Tupou II died and was succeeded by Queen Sālote Tupou III.
1965	16 December	Sālote Tupou died and was succeeded by King Tāufaʻāhau Tupou IV.
1970	July	Tonga regained full sovereignty and independence from the United Kingdom and joined the Commonwealth of Nations.
1999	14 September	Tonga joined the United Nations.

== 21st century ==
Year	Date	Event
2006	30 March	Feleti Sevele was appointed the first non-noble Prime Minister of Tonga since Shirley Baker in the 19th century.
2006	11 September	Tāufaʻāhau Tupou IV died and was succeeded as king by George Tupou V.
2006	16 November	2006 Nuku'alofa riots: Riots hit Nukuʻalofa, with protestors demanding a faster transition to democracy. Some rioters burned down and looted Chinese-owned shops and businesses. Eight looters died in a burning building.
2006	17 November	George Tupou promised democratic legislative elections for 2008.
2010	25 November	2010 Tongan general election: An election produced a Parliament in which an absolute majority of representatives were elected by the people, and which had the power to select a Prime Minister.
2012	18 March	George Tupou V died and was succeeded as king by Tupou VI.
2014	27 November	2014 Tongan general election: The Democratic Party of the Friendly Islands is able to form a government for the first time. Veteran pro-democracy campaigner ʻAkilisi Pohiva becomes Prime Minister. He is the first commoner to be elected Prime Minister by a predominantly elected Parliament.
2021	20 December	2022 Hunga Tonga–Hunga Haʻapai eruption and tsunami: Hunga Tonga–Hunga Haʻapai, a submarine volcano erupts. This causes tsunamis to hit from Tonga to Peru.
2024	2 February	Tupou VI purportedly revoked the appointment of Siaosi Sovaleni as the armed forces minister and Fekitamoeloa ʻUtoikamanu as the minister of foreign affairs and tourism.
