= Tamaha =

Tamaha can stand for:

- Tamaha (Dakota scout) (1776–1864), Mdewakanton Dakota who supported the United States in the War of 1812
- Tamaha, Oklahoma, United States, a town
- Tamahā (Tonga), holy child, the title for the sister of the Tuʻi Tonga, a traditional dynasty in Tonga
- Tsamai language, also known as Tamaha, spoken in Ethiopia
