= Tuʻi Haʻatakalaua =

Dynasty of Tongan kings

The Tuʻi Haʻatakalaua is a dynasty of Tongan monarchs which originated in the 15th century and assumed political power from the Tuʻi Tonga line. In the 18th century, it merged power with the Tuʻi Kanokupolu dynasty, and became existent only esoterically by the end of the 18th century.

1. Moʻungāmotuʻa – around 1470; might have been first installed as viceroy by his older brother Kauʻulufonua I the incumbent Tuʻi Tonga, as the latter remained in his residence on the high grounds of Olotele in Muʻa, while he had to stay on the lowlaying lands of Fonuamotu, reclaimed from the lagoon. These two areas were separated by the Fonuamoa (dry land) road. As such his followers became known as the Kauhalalalo (low road people) while the chiefs associated with the Tuʻi Tonga line became known as Kauhalaʻuta (inland road people). However considering what happened after, it seems that later (or sooner) Moʻungāmotuʻa seized all the power from his brother although he did not dare to wipe out completely the Tuʻi Tonga. Instead he sent Kauʻulufonua away to Samoa and reigned in his name until his new dynasty, the Tuʻi Haʻatakalaua line had grown powerful to eclipse the Tuʻi Tonga. That took about a century.
2. Tanekinaʻotonga
3. Kau Vaka'uta - Tu'i 'Eua (Vaka'uta Title Holder of 'Eua)
4. Siulangapō
5. Vakalahi-Moheʻuli – around 1550, he (or his father) allowed the Tuʻi Tonga to come back from exile in Samoa
6. Moʻunga ʻo Tonga – he had several sons whom he appointed governors. One of them, Ngata, was appointed to the Hihifo district and imperceptibly started the Tuʻi Kanokupolu line. A daughter married Fatafehi, the Tuʻi Tonga, starting a blood relationship between the two dynasties.
7. Fotofili - was met by Abel Tasman in 1643
8. Vaea - discovered that the Tuʻi Kanokupolu had grown into a serious rival, and fought a civil war against Mataelehaʻamea. His daughter was the last one to marry a Tuʻi Tonga, ʻUluakimata II
9. Moeakiola - contemporary with Tuʻi Tonga Tuʻipulotu I, who preferred a Tuʻi Kanokupolu princess as wife
10. Tatafu - first one not to be a son of his predecessor, he was the son of Fotofili
11. Kafoamotalau - a son of Vaea, showing quick successions, troubles, and a decline with the Tuʻi Haʻatakalaua line; contemporary with Tuʻi Tonga Fakanaʻanaʻa
12. Tuʻionukulave
13. Silivakaifanga
14. Fuatakifolaha - son of Tongatangataulupekifolaha, who was not a Tuʻi Haʻatakalaua (or perhaps was according to others); grandson (through his mother) of Mataelehaʻamea the Tuʻi Kanokupolu; therefore troubles and quick successions had still not ceased
15. Tupoulahi - gave up around 1771 his title as Tuʻi Kanokupolu because of old age and may have been offered the Tuʻi Haʻatakalaua title instead. Generally, however, it is doubted whether he was ever formally installed.
16. Maealiuaki - was also a previous Tuʻi Kanokupolu, and also was offered the Tuʻi Haʻatakalaua title as an old age gift. It is not sure whether he really accepted or considered himself as retired. Met in that state with Captain Cook in 1777; died shortly after. With him went the last real Tuʻi Haʻatakalaua. Any successor named by history after him is dubious at best.
17. Mumui - may or may not have been the Tuʻi Haʻatakalaua, depending on whether his older brother Maealiuaki respectively was it not or was it
18. Toafunaki - was mentioned around 1790 as the Tuʻi Haʻatakalaua by the missionaries, but seems never to have been officially installed. Died young in 1797 and his reburial in 1799 was an opportunity for the assassination of the Tuʻi Kanokupolu Tukuʻaho.
19. Mulikihaʻamea - even more uncertain about whether he had ever been a real Tuʻi Haʻatakalaua. He also served as Tuʻi Kanokupolu for a time. Some believe that he succeeded Maealiuaki, while others consider him to be a replacement for Toafunaki. Regardless of the case, by this time, the title had become defunct, but it would be his descendants who would claim to have been the Tuʻi Haʻatakalaua otherwise.

His son was Fatukimotulalo, whose son was Tungī Halatuituia. By then the line had acquired a new title: Tungī, which still is nowadays one of the highest noble titles in Tonga. Halatuituia's son was Tukuʻaho (of the lakalaka fame), who was on his turn the father of Viliami Tungī Mailefihi, who amalgamated with the Tuʻi Kanokupolu.

Four out of the current 33 hereditary noble titles in Tonga trace their authority from the Tuʻi Haʻatakalaua. These are: Tungī, Luani, Fotofili and Fakafānua. Collectively they are known as the Fāaʻi hai (those four). The traditional burial grounds of the Tuʻi Haʻatakalaua is in 'Eua, and in Lapaha are: Fale pulemālō, Fale fakauō, Fale tuingapapai (or tuipapai), Fale loloʻamanu (nowadays split up into (Fale) Loʻāmanu and Tauhakeleva). These five are considered to be traditional langi although not named so, as the real langi are for the Tuʻi Tonga only.

== See also ==
- Tuʻi Tonga Empire
- History of Tonga
- Malo Tonga Tuputupulefanua Tu'iha'atakalaua Cocker 2000
