= Momo (Tonga) =

10th Tuʻi Tonga (c.11th-12th century)

- Reign: Around 1100
- Predecessor: ʻAfulunga
- Successor: Tuʻitātui
- Dynasty: Tuʻi Tonga

Momo (meaning: crumb) was the 10th king in the Tuʻi Tonga dynasty of Tonga, who lived in the 11th or 12th century CE. He was named after one of the original gods of Tonga, a trio known as Kohai, Koau, mo Momo. The Tuʻi Tonga maritime empire began to expand during his reign.

King Momo had his court in Heketā, near the village of Niutōua (doubly planted coconuttrees). His people were known as the Haʻa-mene-ʻuli (dirty bottoms Clan), because in order to honour him they had to keep their heads lower than his, and thus shuffled around on their bottoms instead of their feet.

== Marriage ==
One day, the king fell in love with a beautiful girl and sent his envoy, Lehaʻuli, to her father, Loʻau, the Tuʻi-Haʻamea, or Haʻamea king — to request a yam for his plantation. However, Loʻau understood the true meaning of the request and replied that he could not help, as one yam was not yet ready and the other had already sprouted. By this, he meant that his youngest daughter was too young, while his older daughter, Nua, had already had a child and was therefore considered old. Nua's husband was Ngongo Kilitoto, chief of the Haʻangongo clan from Malapo.

The next day, Momo sent his envoy back to Loʻau with the message: 'Fena kā ko Nua' (it has sprouted, but it is still Nua). Loʻau then went to Malapo and asked Ngongo Kilitoto to give up his wife, which he did. Nua became Momo's wife and their son, Tuʻitātui, became the greatest Tuʻi Tonga of that period. His elder stepbrother, Fasiʻapule, later became a governor.

The exact location of Haʻamea is uncertain. Some claim it was in the centre of Tongatapu, near Matangiake. In this case, Loʻau would have been only a minor prince. Alternatively, the name could be a variant of Haʻamoa in Samoa. In this case, Loʻau would have been a powerful king, and the marriage story would represent the mythical beginning of the alliance between Tonga and Samoa and the start of the empire. However, this alliance would only last one generation.

Preceded by ʻAfulunga	Tuʻi Tonga around 1100	Succeeded by Tuʻitātui
