= Tuʻi Tonga Fefine =

Title of the spiritual leader of Tonga – in ancient times

"Tu'i Tonga Fefine" (Tongan for 'Female Tu'i Tonga') was a title granted to the eldest heiress of the Tu'i Tonga, or spiritual leader of Tonga, in ancient times. She held a higher social status than the Tu'i Tonga himself. The title is no longer in use.

According to tradition, the first Tu'i Tonga Fefine was Sinaitakala-‘ilangileka, a daughter of ʻUluaki-mata I.

Marriage between the Tu'i Tonga Fefine and a Tongan man was deemed inappropriate. The title-holder was expected to remain a virgin unless or until she married a 'stranger' of high rank. The first Tu'i Tonga Fefine married a high-ranking Fijian, to form the 'Ha'a Falefisi' ("House of Fiji") line. Tu'i Tonga Fefine in succeeding generations were also expected to marry a title holder of the 'Ha'a Falefisi'. This strategy of marrying the title-holder to non-Tongans helped to safeguard the Tu'i Tonga's position, as the Tu'i Tonga Fefine's children would otherwise have outranked him.

The Tu'i Tonga Fefine retained her rank throughout her life. However, she remained the highest spiritual entity in Tonga only until she gave birth to a daughter. This child outranked her mother and became the highest spiritual entity in Tonga, with the title of Tamahā ("Sacred Child").
