= Holonga (Tongatapu) =

Village in Tongatapu, Tonga

Coordinates: 21.192°S 175.143°W

Holonga is a small village in the eastern (Hahake) district of Tongatapu in the kingdom of Tonga. It lies between the villages of Malapo and ʻAlakifonua. It had a population of 488 in 2016.

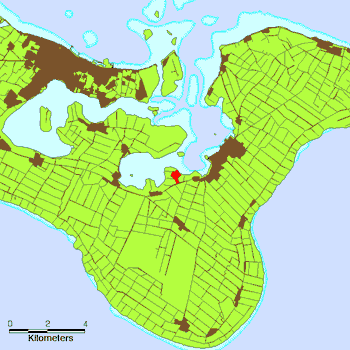
Map highlighting the location of Holonga

== Origin ==
According to a legendary popular story, Holonga originally got its name from the people of Pea. They escaped from their hometown after they lost the battle against Nukuʻalofa. Some Pea people ran as far to Malapo and stayed there, some ran and settled at Tatakamotonga and Vaini. When the rest of the people of Pea still ran, they got tired and weary. They stopped, turned, and hid in the bush. That place was named Holonga. Holo means escaped and nga means cry.

Nickname (Hingoa Fakatenetene): Tutu'angakava

Historic Sites: Fehi'a-kae-afe, Funga Tufukafa, Veikumete, Vaisio'ata
