= Talatama =

12th Tuʻi Tonga (c. 12th century)

- Reign: Around 1150
- Predecessor: Tuʻitātui
- Successor: "Tamatou", then Talaihaʻapepe
- Dynasty: Tuʻi Tonga

Talatama is named as the oldest son of Tuʻitātui and succeeded him as the 12th Tuʻi Tonga (king of Tonga) somewhere in the middle of the 12th century AD.

They lived at Heketā, along the northcoast of Tongatapu, with its rocky shore. Launching and landing canoes was difficult and the surf of the sea was always noisy. The nearby village of Kolonga, nowadays is nicknamed ʻUtulongoaʻa (noisy coast), because that was what Talatama's sister Fatafehi said.

Either to please her or just to find a better harbour for themselves Talatama and his younger brother Talaihaʻapepe decided to move the royal court to Muʻa (meaning: first, because as the new capital, the village would be the first to receive honours). Indeed, the coast there was sandy and muddy, safe for the boats, the big royal canoes, named ʻĀkiheuho and Tongafuesia, and it was quiet. The place was named Fangalongonoa (silent shore).

Since that time, up to the last Tuʻi Tonga, Laufilitonga, the dynasty has always remained in Muʻa.

== Successors ==
Preceded by Tuʻitātui	Tuʻi Tonga around 1150	Succeeded by Tamatou
