= Tuʻi-tā-tui =

11th Tuʻi Tonga (c. 12th century)

- Reign: Around 1100
- Predecessor: Momo
- Successor: Talatama
- Dynasty: Tuʻi Tonga

Tuʻi-tā-tui (translation: The king who strikes the knee) was the 11th king of the Tuʻi Tonga, a dynasty in Tonga, who lived during the 12th century AD.

== Heketā ==
Tuʻitātui had, like his father Momo, his court in Heketā (meaning: cripple hit), near the village of Niutōua on Tongatapu. It was there that he built, as an impressive gateway to the royal compound, the Haʻamonga-ʻa-Maui. From the Haʻamonga a path proceeded about 50 m to the slightly elevated ʻesi maka fākinanga, (stone to lean against) where the king sat against with his back, safe from any assassin from that direction. He was a huge, strong man, and easily handled a large stick as whether it was nothing. He hit everybody against the knees who would approach him too closely from the front. At par with this was his introduction of a new kava circle layout (a formal gathering of the chiefs of the country under him), in which the king sat more apart from the others (including supposed assassins) than before.

He also built there at Heketā the earliest known langi (burial tombs)– Langi Heketā and Langi Moʻungalafa (where four of his children were buried), but he himself would not use them. These stone structures still exist. He also made a sporting field to play sikaʻulutoa (reed throwing stick).

== Rule ==
In addition to the Tuʻi Tonga maritime empire, Tuʻitātui also inherited from his father-in-law Loʻau as a kind of prime minister. Together they put through landownership and social reforms, re-shuffled and strengthened the royal council of the Fale Fā (house of four), the ancient royal counselors and royal guardians of the Tuʻi Tonga. Tuʻitātui removed from the Fale Fā, Matakehe and Tuʻifolaha and replaced them with Tuʻitalau and Tuʻiʻamanave from Talau of the northern island of Vava'u.

As a prince Tuʻitātui probably had had a sheltered life, away from others. One story tells of how Tuʻitātui did not know that he had an older stepbrother named Fasiʻapule until he introduced himself to Tuʻitātui with riddles. The king was impressed and made Fasiʻapule a governor.

== Sāngone ==
Tongan stories tell that Tuʻitātui had a pet turtle named Sāngone of which he was very fond. One day a Samoan named Lekapai stole the turtle and ate it. By the time Fasiʻapule came with a recovery expedition to Savaiʻi, only the shell was left, buried at a secret place and guarded over by the dwarf Lafaipana. Only when Fasiʻapule had shown he was sharper witted than Lafaipana in solving riddles was he able to get the shell and return it to Tonga.

This story might be symbolic for the start of a revolt in Samoa by the chiefs Lekapai and Lafaipana, counteracted by Loʻau Tuputoka and Fasiʻapule. It would still take a century or so before Samoans drove out the last Tongan occupier from their soil.

== Nua ==
Another tale recounts how one day Tu'itonga Momo came along the weatherside of ʻEueiki island and saw a woman with her legs in the sea. For a while he was not sure whether she was a human or an evil ghost, but after some discussion and solving riddles, he decided she was human and asked her to come to Olotele, the residence of the Tuʻi Tonga. She then told her name was Nua, and agreed to come with the king.

Nua bore him three sons, Tu'itatui, Uanga, ʻAfulunga, and Sina, along with a daughter named Fatafehi. Uanga built the Langi Leka, the first langi in Muʻa, he also moved the royal court there after his father's death.

== Last years ==
Tuʻitātui had several big houses in Heketā, and they were provided with a high platforms, called fata, made from fehi wood, and as such called fatafehi. The word has since become a royal name in Tonga; one Fatafehi was the king's daughter.

Another Tongan legend states that one day the king climbed up on such a raised platform and yelled to his sister, Lātūtama below: "Oh, some big vessels are coming, from Haʻapai very likely." "Lies!", his sister answered. "Not lies, come up and see it for yourself. It is a large fleet, 1, 2, 5, no 100 boats I think", the king retorted. So the woman went up, and nothing to be seen. The king then seized her and raped her, knowing that no one could see them. Lātūtama's maiden attendants below saw blood trickling down and asked what it was. "Oh, it is from a flying fox", Tuʻitātui answered. As such the place is still known as Toipeka (blood drip of the peka (flying fox)).Lātūtama's brothers were enraged on hearing this and swore to kill the king. Tuʻitātui had to flee to ʻEua, but did not escape his fate.

Meanwhile, Fasiʻapule had returned from Fiji, and hearing that Tuʻitātui was in ʻEua, he, and a Fijian friend, embarked in their canoe there. They were attracted by a strange light, which on arrival turned out to be the funeral torches of the dead king. Fasiʻapule killed his Fijian friend, substituted him on the place of Tuʻitātui and smuggled the body of the latter away from ʻEua. Approaching Tongatapu, he rested at one of the outer islands and that island from then on was called Motutapu (sacred island), because it had served as a resting place for a Tuʻi Tonga. He then went on to Malapo. But night came, and the procession had to stop on an island in the lagoon, close to Folaha, and that island is still known as Moʻungatapu (sacred mountain). Next day, Malapo was reached and the body was taken care of by Tuʻitātui's mother's tribe, the Haʻangongo.

There are claims that Tuʻitātui is not buried in Malapo, but in Muʻa. The people of ʻUiha claim that he is buried there in the southeast corner of the island. In a remote area is an ancient grave which contain the bones of a huge man and it is Tuʻitātui's. There is also a claim that he is buried somewhere in one of the small islands south of ʻUiha known as the ʻOtu Motu Kinekina Felemea, as they have become a symbol for the Tuʻi Tonga for this reason.

Preceded by Momo	Tuʻi Tonga around 1100	Succeeded by Talatama
