= Tamatou =

Wooden doll and former king of Tonga

Tamatou (Tongan for 'child of tou wood') was a wooden doll which, according to oral tradition, ruled as the 13th Tuʻi Tonga of the Tuʻi Tonga Empire in the mid-12th century. It succeeded Talatama and preceded his brother Talaihaʻapepe.

== History ==
=== The king lists ===
Two lists of Tuʻi Tonga were collected; one by Catholic missionaries from Laufilitonga, the last to hold the title, encompassing 39 entries, and another by Wesleyan missionary Shirley Baker from Vealeʻovale, the sister of Queen Sālote Lupepauʻu, and Hepisipa, the daughter of Laufilitonga, which has 48 entries. The Baker list is considered less reliable as its ordering does not correspond with relationships given in various traditions and many of its names are seemingly alternative names for known kings. In the Catholic list, Tamatou is listed as the 13th Tuʻi Tonga, but in the Baker list, it is placed as the 28th.

=== "Accession" and "death" ===
In Tongan oral tradition, the 12th Tuʻi Tonga, Talatama, died without children around the mid-12th century. His brother Talaihaʻapepe, who, according to some accounts was a child at the time, had wanted to succeed Talatama, but the other chiefs did not allow him to do this as he was Talatama's brother. In order to continue the bloodline, a wooden doll named Tamatou was installed as Tuʻi Tonga and declared the son of Talatama; Talaihaʻapepe claimed that he was the "son" of Tamatou, and thus the "grandson" of Talatama, in order to ascend to the throne. The doll had a garment like any human would and is said to have taken a wife; the people are reported to have believed that Tamatou was a real man. His wife was subsequently reported to be "pregnant"; after three years, Talaihaʻapepe announced that Tamatou had "died" and Talaihaʻapepe thus became the 14th Tuʻi Tonga. Tamatou is said to have been buried in a tomb with the same name in Makaunga, excavated by W. C. McKern, and would have rotted away afterward; he failed to find any human remains interred there, thus seemingly lending support to the theory that it was buried there, but a tradition from Lapaha holds that Tamatou was buried instead at Faletoonga and that the tomb at Makaunga was a more recent construction.

| Preceded by Talatama | Tuʻi Tonga mid-12th century | Succeeded by Talaihaʻapepe |
