= Malapo =

Village in Tongatapu, Tonga

Coordinates: 21°12′S 175°09′W

Malapo is a small village in the eastern district of Tongatapu in the kingdom of Tonga. It is located in the fork of the road junction, where the main road to Nukuʻalofa splits into the road to Muʻa and beyond and the road to the airport near Fuaʻamotu. It is near to the neighbouring village of Holonga. The population is 647.

== Overview ==
The village is located on (chief) Luani's estate, and the main hall is called after him: Tāufatoutai. The famous faikava singers, the Afoeteau (100 chords) hail from Malapo.

There is a huge mound in Malapo, which may contain the remnants of king Tuʻitātui, but no one knows for sure, and the government is unwilling to have archeologists start digging.
