= Tamahā =

Ceremonial name in Tonga

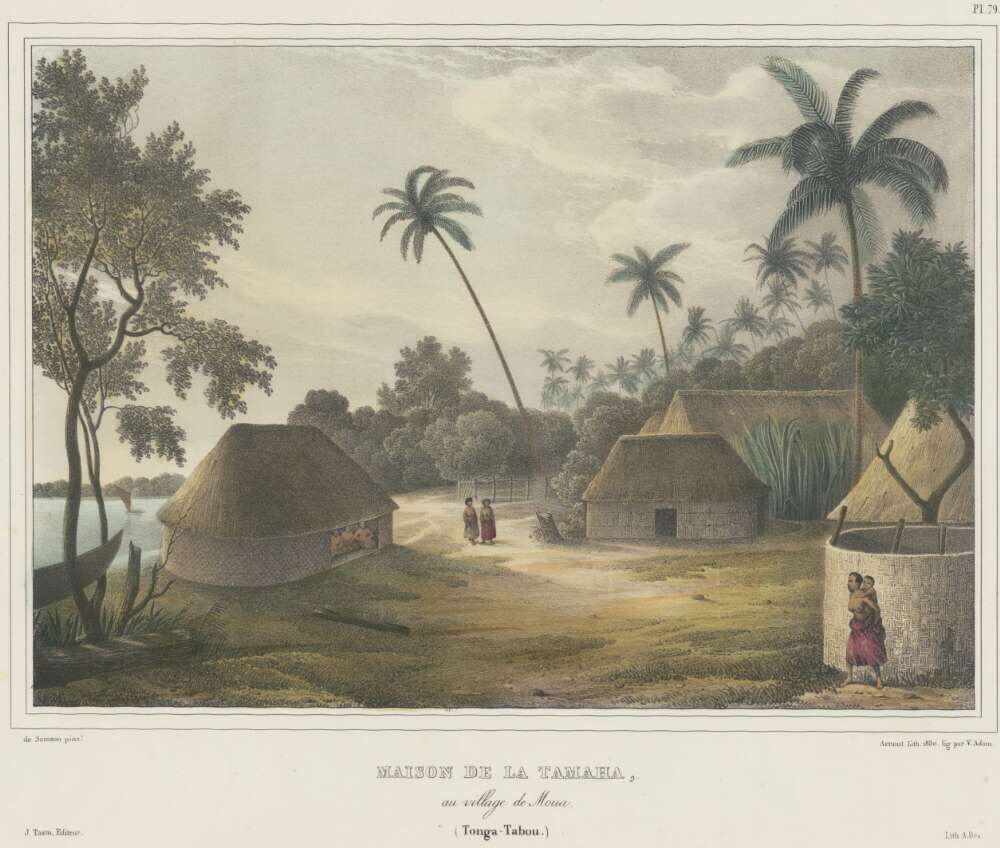
House of the Tamahā

Tamahā is the ceremonial name of the daughter of the Tuʻi Tonga's (King of Tonga's) sister. The eldest sister of the Tuʻi Tonga (King of Tonga) is usually called the Tuʻi Tonga Fefine.

The special title of Tamahā is given to the eldest daughter of the Tu'i Tonga Fefine and a chief of one of the Falefisi (Tu'i Ha'ateiho or Tu'i Lakepa). The Tamahā had the highest social status in the land, because she was fahu ("above the law") to the Tu'i Tonga. However, she did not have the highest societal rank (ha'a). The Tamahā did not rule the land and had no real power within the societal structure.
