= Tuʻi Tonga Empire =

Empire based in Oceania during around 950s–1865

- 950–1865
- Flag (1862–1866)

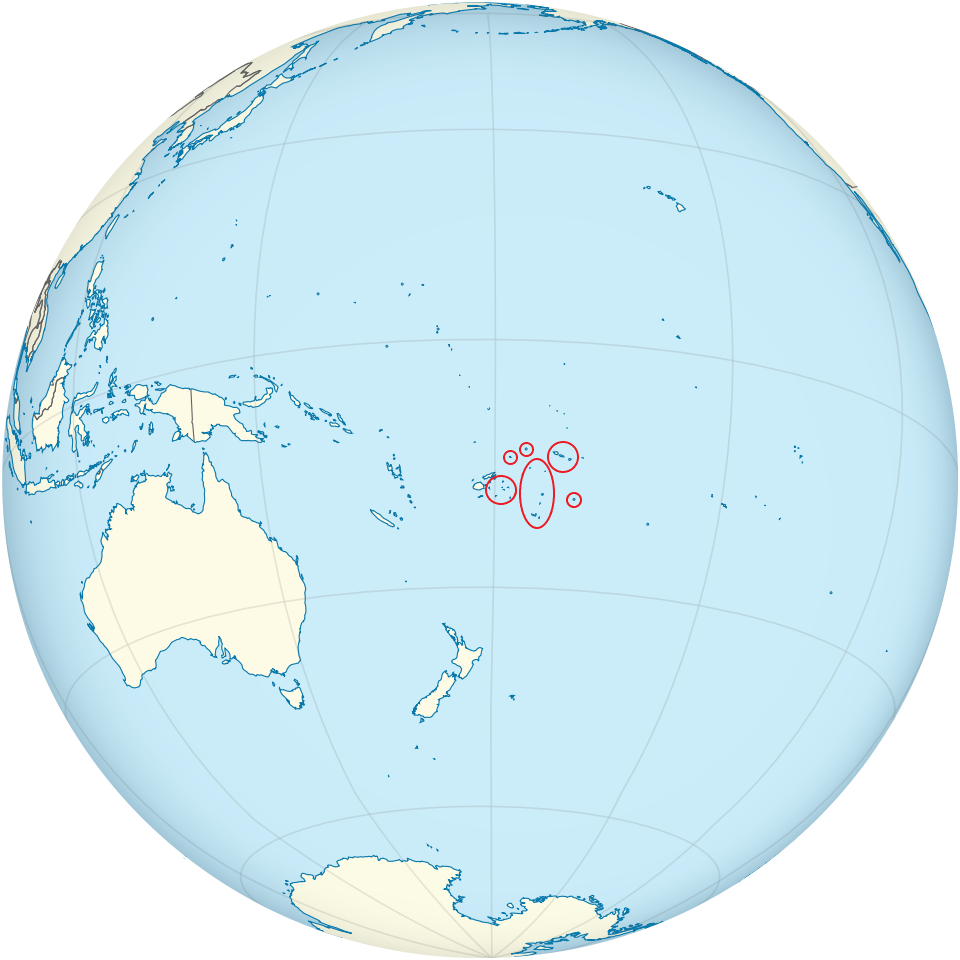
- Map of the Tu'i Tonga Empire at its territorial height around 1200 AD. Core territories and regular tributaries are circled in red. Intermittent or disputed tributaries are circled in purple.

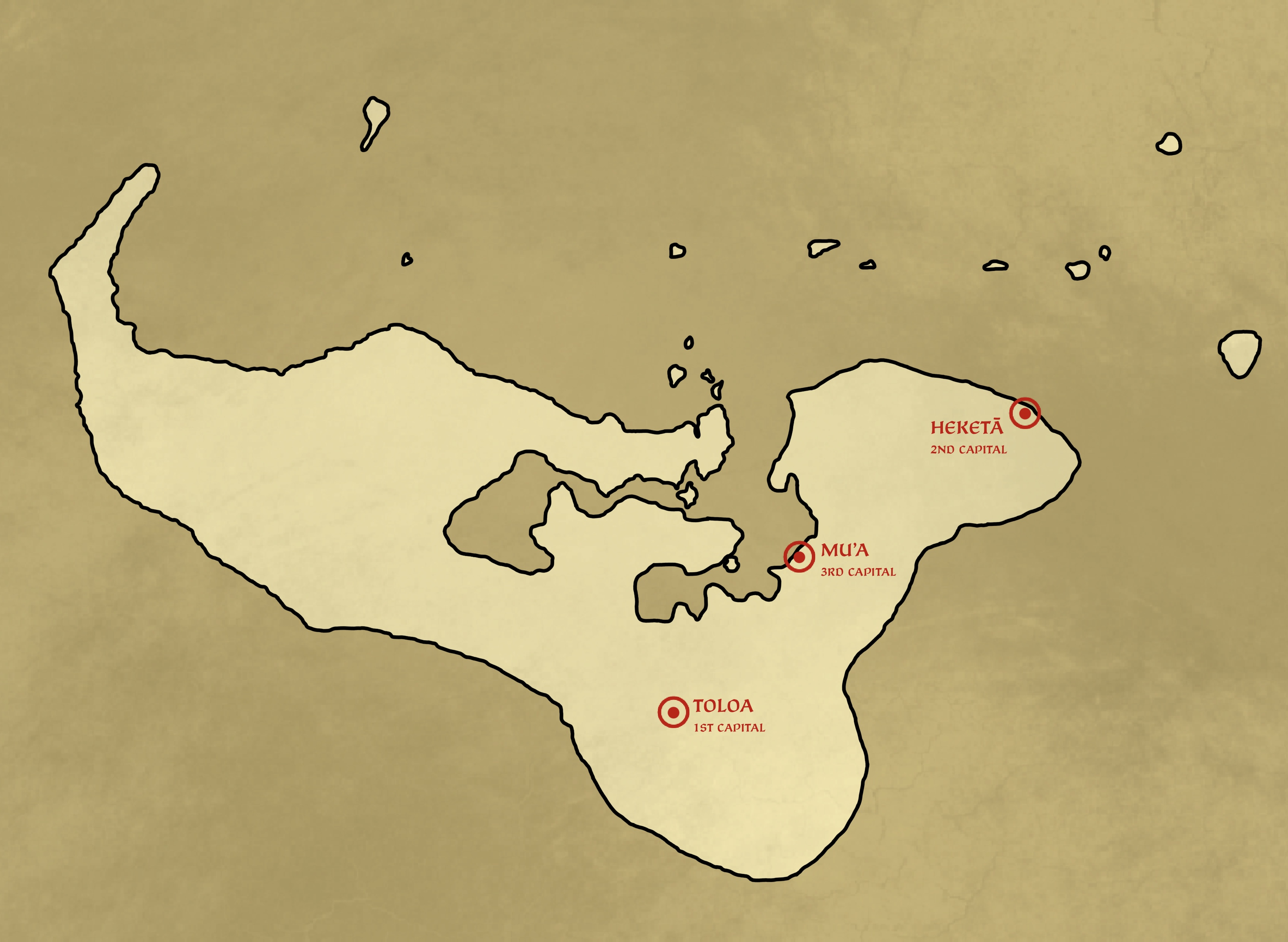
- Map of the capitals of the Tu’i Tonga Empire on the island of Tongatapu
- Capital: Toloa; Heketā; Muʻa
- Common languages: Tongan, other Polynesian languages
- Religion: Tongan narrative Other Polynesian religions
- Government: Monarchy
- Tuʻi Tonga
  - 950 CE: ʻAhoʻeitu
  - 1827–1865: Laufilitonga
- History
  - ʻAhoʻeitu brought his faction to Samoa: 950
  - the title Tuʻi Tonga was abolished: 1865

The Tuʻi Tonga Empire, or Tongan Empire, are descriptions sometimes given to Tongan expansionism and projected hegemony in Oceania which began around 950 CE, reaching its peak during the period 1200–1500.

It was centred in Tonga on the island of Tongatapu, with its capital at Muʻa. Modern researchers and cultural experts attest to widespread Tongan influence, evidence of transoceanic trade and exchange of material and non-material cultural artefacts.

Captain James Cook observed and recorded his accounts of the Tuʻi Tonga kings during his visits to the Friendly Isles of Tonga.

== History ==
=== Beginning of Tongan expansionism ===
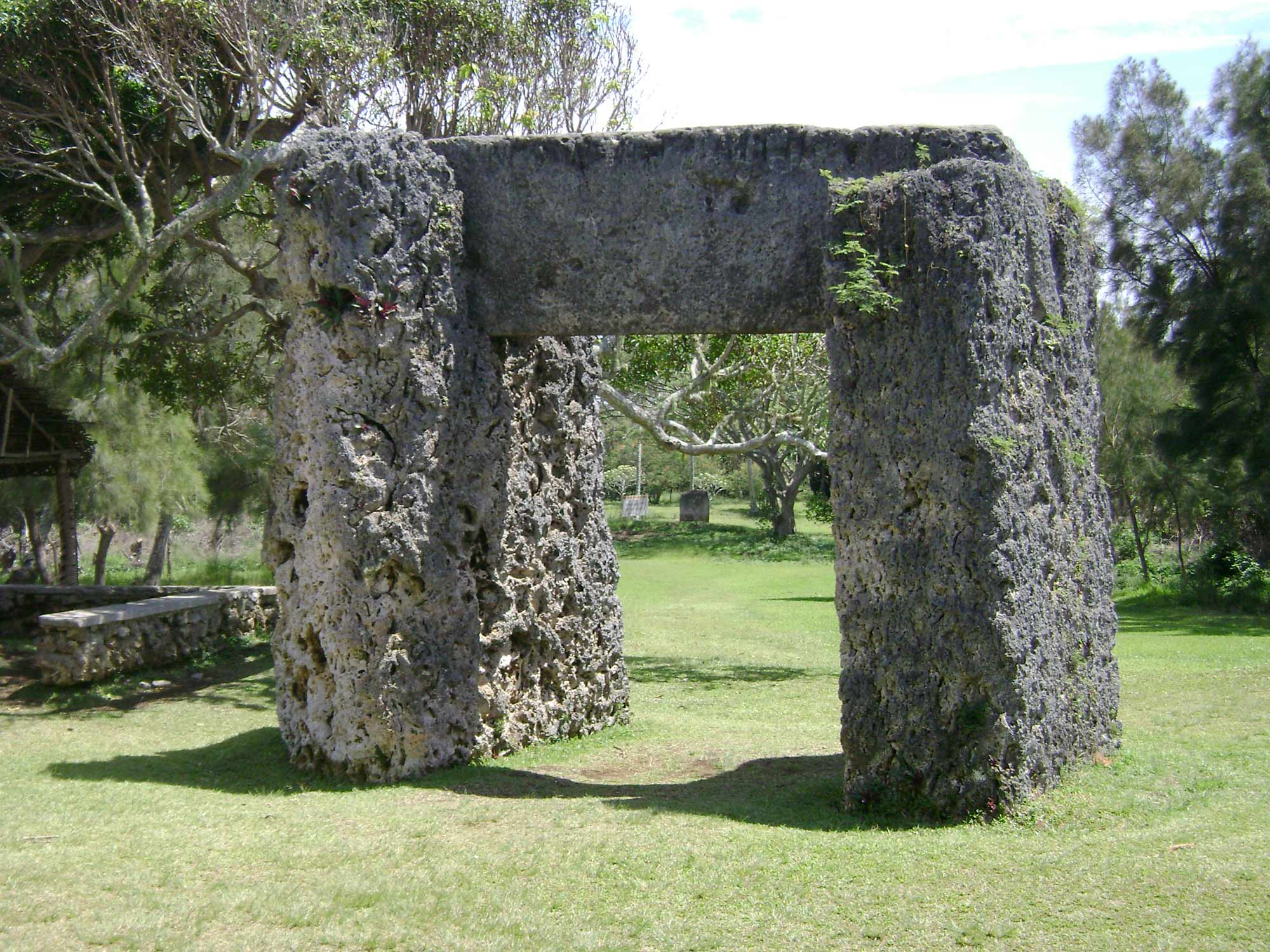
The Haʻamonga ʻa Maui in Niutoua, built by Tuʻitātui in the 13th century

As Samoa's Tui Manuʻa maritime empire began to decline, a new empire rose from the South. In about 950 AD, the first Tuʻi Tonga ʻAhoʻeitu started to expand his rule outside of Tonga. According to leading Tongan scholar Dr. 'Okusitino Mahina, the Tongan and Samoan oral traditions indicate that the first Tuʻi Tonga was the son of their god Tangaloa. As the ancestral homeland of the Tuʻi Tonga dynasty and the abode of deities such as Tagaloa ʻEitumatupuʻa, Tonga Fusifonua, and Tavatavaimanuka, the Manuʻa islands of Samoa were considered sacred by the early Tongan kings. By the time of the 10th Tuʻi Tonga Momo, and his successor, Tuʻitātui, the Tuʻi Tonga Empire had grown to include much of the former domains of the Tui Fiti and Tui Manuʻa, with the Manuʻa group being the only exception, remaining under Tui Manuʻa rule. To better govern the large territory, the Tuʻi Tonga had their throne moved by the lagoon at Lapaha, Tongatapu. The influence of the Tuʻi Tonga was renowned throughout the Pacific, and many of the neighbouring islands participated in the widespread trade of resources and new ideas.

=== Expansion (1200–1600) ===
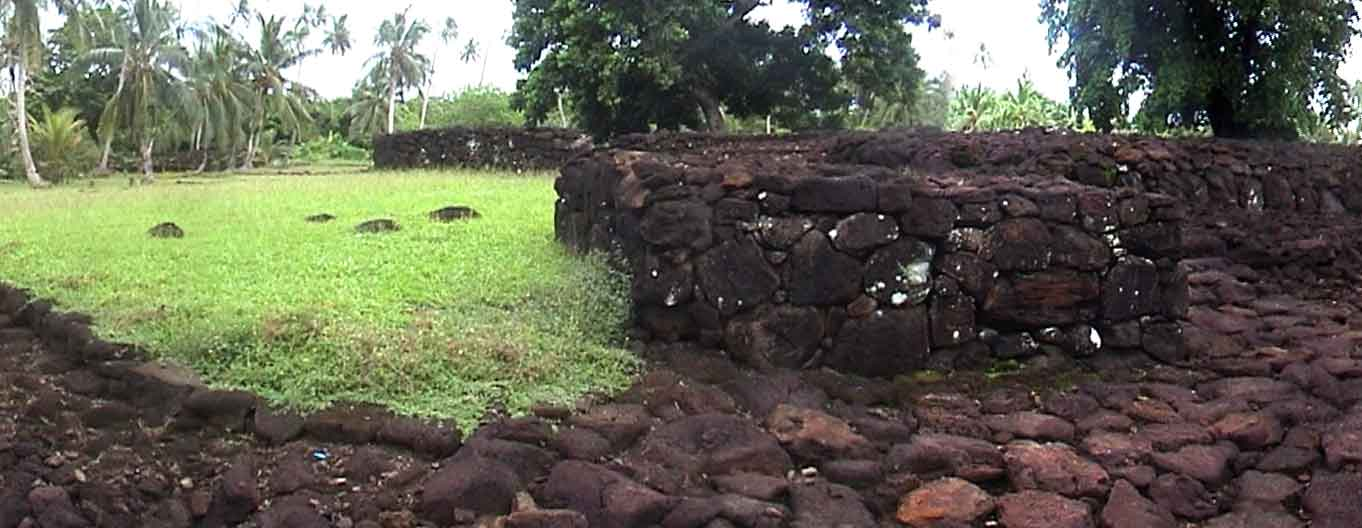
The Talietumu fortress, built on Wallis by Tongans in the 15th century

Under the 10th Tuʻi Tonga, Momo and his son Tuʻi-tā-tui (11th Tuʻi Tonga) the empire was at its height of expansion, tributes for the Tuʻi Tonga were said to be exacted from all tributary chiefdoms of the empire. This tribute was known as the ʻInasi and was conducted annually at Mu'a following the harvest season when all countries that were subject to the Tuʻi Tonga must bring a gift for the gods, who was recognized as the Tuʻi Tonga. Captain James Cook witnessed an Inasi ceremony in 1777.

The finest mats of Samoa (ʻie tōga) are incorrectly translated as "Tongan mats;" the correct meaning is "treasured cloth" ("ie" = cloth, "tōga" = female goods, in opposition to "oloa" = male goods). Many fine mats came into the possession of the Tongan royal families through chiefly marriages with Samoan noblewomen, such as Tohuʻia, the mother of the first Tuʻi Kanokupolu, Ngata, who came from Safata, ʻUpolu, Samoa. These mats, including the Maneafaingaa and Tasiaeafe, are considered the crown jewels of the current Tupou line (which is derived matrilineally from Samoa). The success of the Empire was largely based upon the Imperial Navy. The most common vessels were long-distance double-canoes fitted with triangular sails. The largest canoes of the Tongan kalia type could carry up to 100 men. The most notable of these were the Tongafuesia, ʻĀkiheuho, the Lomipeau, and the Takaʻipōmana. It should be mentioned that the Takaʻipōmana was actually a Samoan kalia; according to Queen Sālote and the Palace Records this was the Samoan double-hulled canoe that brought Tohuʻia Limapō from Samoa to wed the Tuʻi Haʻatakalaua. The large navy allowed for Tonga to become wealthy with large amounts of trade and tribute flowing into the royal treasury.

The voyaging under during the Tuʻi Tonga Empire extended as far as the Tuvaluan archipelago. The oral history of Nanumea describes the founding ancestor as being from Tonga. The oral history of Niutao recalls that in the 15th century Tongan warriors were defeated in a battle on the reef of Niutao. Tongan warriors also invaded Niutao later in the 15th century and again were repelled. A third and fourth invasion of Tongan occurred in the late 16th century, again with the Tongans being defeated.

During the Tongan invasions of the Wallis and Futuna islands in the 15th and 16th centuries, the islands defended themselves with varying levels of resistance, but also accepted varying degrees of assimilation. Futuna retained more of its pre-Tongan cultural features, while Wallis (Uvea) underwent greater fundamental changes in its society, language, and culture.

=== Decline of Tuʻi Tonga and two new dynasties ===
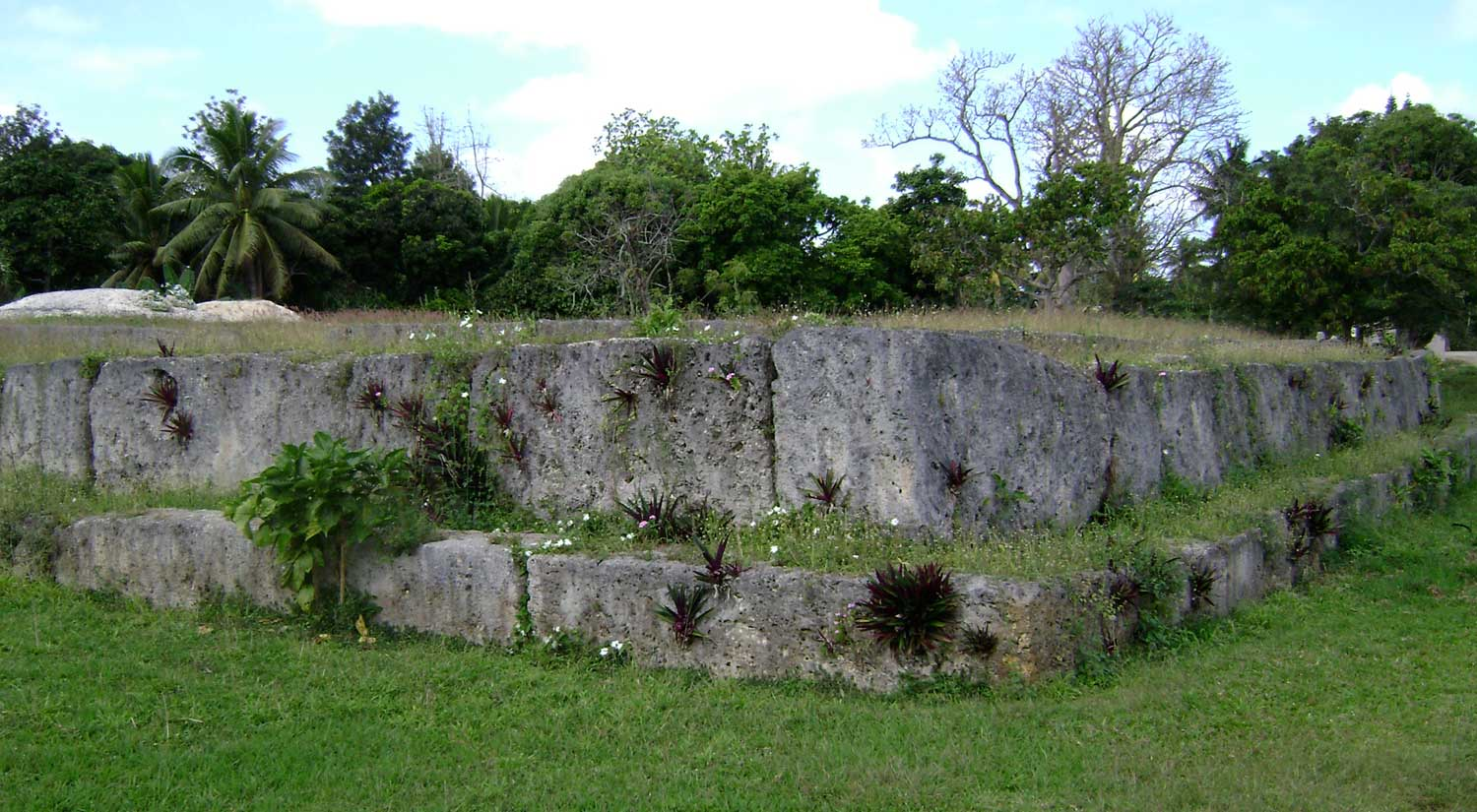
Royal tomb in Muʻa, built by ʻUluakimata in the 16th century

The Tuʻi Tonga decline began due to numerous wars and internal pressure. In the 13th or 14th centuries, the Samoans had expelled the Tongans from their lands after Tuʻi Tonga Talakaifaiki was defeated in battle by the brothers Tuna, Fata, and Savea, progenitors of the Malietoa family. In response, the falefā was created as political advisors to the Empire. The falefā officials were initially successful in maintaining some hegemony over other subjected islands but increased dissatisfaction led to the assassination of several rulers in succession. The most notable were, Havea I (19th TT), Havea II (22nd TT), and Takalaua (23rd TT), who were all known for their tyrannical rule. In AD 1535, Takalaua was assassinated by two foreigners while swimming in the lagoon of Muʻa. His successor, Kauʻulufonua I, pursued the killers all the way to ʻUvea, where he killed them.

Because of so many assassination attempts on the Tuʻi Tonga, Kauʻulufonua established a new dynasty called the Ha'a Takalaua in honour of his father and gave his brother, Moʻungamotuʻa, the title of Tuʻi Haʻatakalaua. This new dynasty was to deal with the everyday decisions of the empire, while the position of Tuʻi Tonga was to be the nation's spiritual leader, though he still controlled the final say in the life or death of his people. The Tuʻi Tonga Empire at this period becomes Samoan in orientation as the Tuʻi Tonga kings themselves became ethnic Samoans who married Samoan women and resided in Samoa. Kauʻulufonua's mother was a Samoan from Manu'a, Tuʻi Tonga Kauʻulufonua II and Tuʻi Tonga Puipuifatu had Samoan mothers and as they married Samoan women the succeeding Tuʻi Tonga – Vakafuhu, Tapu'osi, and 'Uluakimata – were allegedly more "Samoan" than "Tongan".

=== Samoan influence and the rise of the Tuʻi Kanokupolu ===
In Samoa, the high chief of Safata, Ama Lele married Soliʻai, a daughter of the Tui Manuʻa. They produced a son Peseta, who was to become the next Ama, and a daughter, Tohuʻia Limapo. Herewith contains the connection to the Tongan royal lineage through Tohuʻia Limapo. Limapo travelled to Tonga with her father Ama Lele, at the express request of the 6th Tuʻi Haʻatakalaua of Tonga, to marry Ama Lele's daughter Limapo. Limapo travelled with a large wedding party, which consisted of the Ama family and the Safata warriors under the charge of Ama Lele.

The product of this marriage was Ngata. In 1610, the 6th Tuʻi Haʻa Takalaua, Moʻungatonga, created the position of Tuʻi Kanokupolu for the half-Samoan Ngata which divided regional rule between them, though as time went on the Tu’i Kanokupolu's power became more and more dominant over Tonga. This title granted Ngata considerable power and provided a strong foundation for his new title of Tuʻi Kanokupolu (translated as the "Heart of Upolu"), a direct homage to his mother's heritage. The Tuʻi Kanokupolu dynasty oversaw the importation and institution of many Samoan policies and titles and according to Tongan scholars, this "Samoanized" form of government and custom continues today in the modern Kingdom of Tonga. Things continued in this manner afterward. The first Europeans arrived in 1616, when the Dutch explorers Willem Schouten and Jacob Le Maire spotted Tongans in a canoe off the coast of Niuatoputapu, followed by Abel Tasman who passed by the islands on 20 January 1643. These visits were brief, however, and did not significantly change the islands.

The dividing line between the two moieties was the old coastal road named Hala Fonua moa (dry land road). Modern chiefs who derive their authority from the Tuʻi Tonga are still named the Kau Hala ʻUta (inland road people), while those from the Tuʻi Kanokupolu are known as the Kau Hala Lalo (low road people). Concerning the Tuʻi Haʻatakalaua supporters: when this division arose, in the 15th century, they were of course the Kauhalalalo. But when the Tuʻi Kanokupolu had overtaken them they shifted their allegiance to the Kauhalaʻuta.

== Modern scholarship ==
Modern archeology, anthropology, and linguistic studies confirm widespread Tongan cultural influence ranging widely through East ʻUvea, Rotuma, Futuna, Samoa, and Niue, parts of Micronesia (Kiribati and Pohnpei), Vanuatu, and New Caledonia and the Loyalty Islands, and while some academics prefer the term "maritime chiefdom", others argue that, while very different from examples elsewhere, "empire" is probably the most convenient term."

== See also ==
- History of Tonga
- Early history of Tonga
- Thalassocracy
