= ʻUluakimata I =

Tongan ruler

ʻUluaki-mata, also known as Teleʻa (active c. 1580-1600 CE), was the twenty-ninth Tuʻi Tonga. He was reportedly one of the mightiest of these rulers, although his power was often characterized as spiritual rather than political. Many traditions recount that his reign was marked by great social changes.

== Reign ==
According to some traditions, ʻUluaki-mata was of the lineage of Lo'au. This would suggest that he was the founder of a new royal line. He may have been not a native prince but a foreigner from ʻUvea or Fiji who came with 500 ʻUvean warriors to claim the throne by force.

Significant social change occurred in Tonga around the time of ʻUluaki-mata's reign, including the creation of the role of Tuʻi Tonga Fefine.

ʻUluaki-mata built the Paepae ʻo Teleʻa (or Paepae o Teleʻa, meaning "Tele'a's Mound"), the royal tomb in Lapaha where one tradition states he was buried. During the 1600s, ʻUluaki-mata also commissioned the construction of a huge kalia (double-hulled canoe) named the Lomipeau ("wavecutter"). Made in ʻUvea (Wallis), the Lomipeau could reportedly carry hundreds of people, and was used for a number of sacred and prestigious purposes.

ʻUluaki-mata reputedly had three chiefly wives (named Talafaiva, Nanasilapaha and Mataukipa) and two hundred secondary wives. According to tradition, Talafaiva was his favourite wife. However, she was seduced one night by either Lolomānaʻia or Lepuhā, when they were on holiday on ʻEuakafa in Vavaʻu. Angrily, Teleʻa ordered his servant ʻAuku (or ʻUka) to beat Talafaiva, which the servant did so thoroughly that she died. Her grave is still on the top of ʻEuakafa. ʻUluaki-mata never returned to Vavaʻu.

One tradition concerning ‘Uluakimata's death states that he was drowned at sea and his body was lost; another states that he is buried in the Paepae ʻo Teleʻa.

== Descendants ==
ʻUluaki-mata's children included his daughter Sinaitakala-‘ilangileka (a Tuʻi Tonga Fefine, she married a chief from Fiji) and his son Fatafehi.

He was succeeded as Tu'i Tonga by Fatafehi.
