= Fakafanua =

Fakafanua is a surname. Notable people with the surname include:

- Fatafehi Fakafanua (born 1985), Tongan politician
- Sinaitakala Fakafanua (born 1987), Tongan royal
