= Trilithon =

Structure consisting of three stones

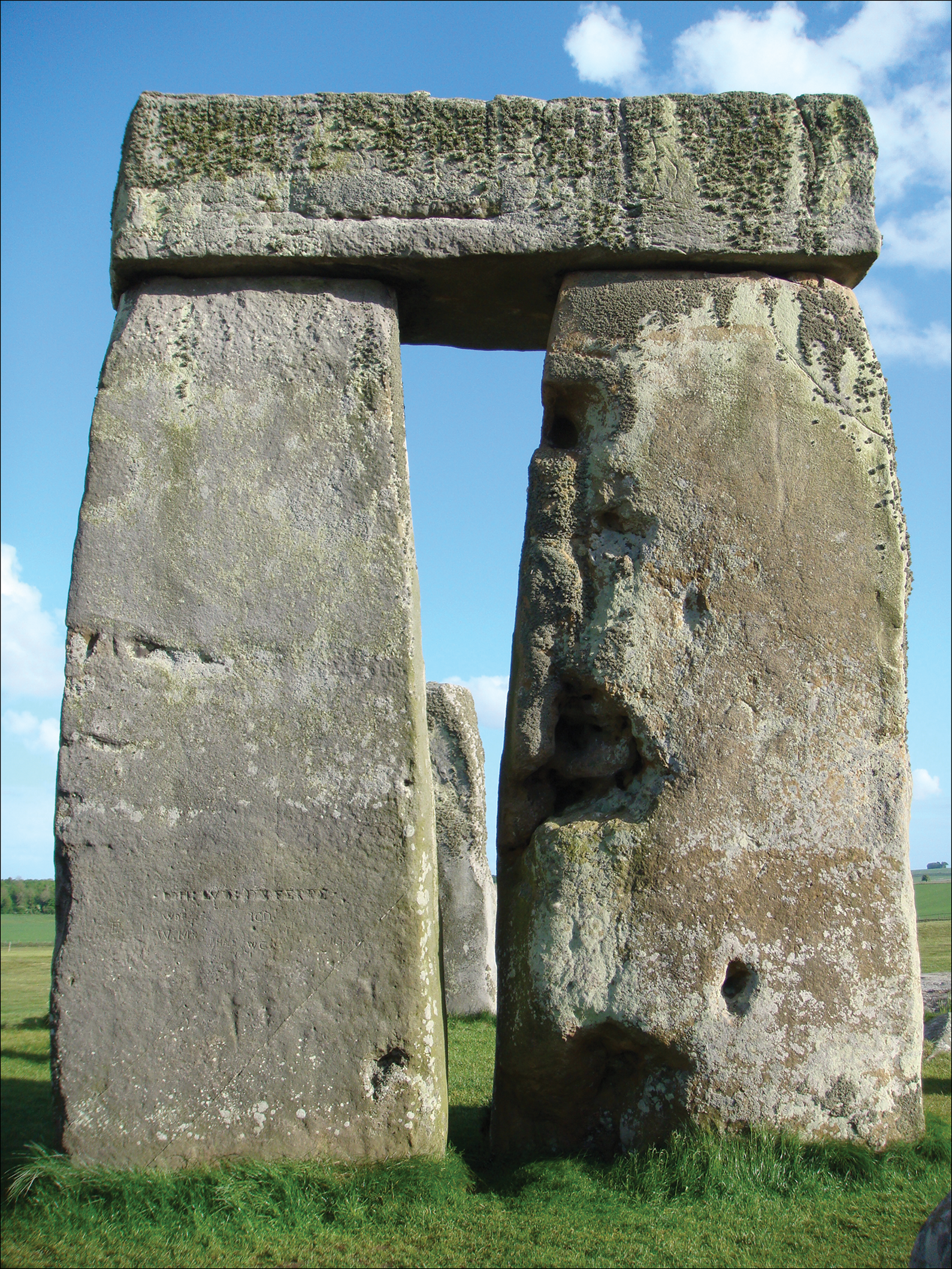
Trilithon at Stonehenge

A trilithon or trilith is a structure consisting of two large vertical stones (posts) supporting a third stone set horizontally across the top (lintel). It is commonly used in the context of megalithic monuments. The most famous trilithons are those of Stonehenge in England.

The word trilithon is derived from Ancient Greek τρι- (tri-), meaning "three", and λίθος (líthos), meaning "stone", and was first used in its modern archaeological sense by William Stukeley.

Other famous trilithons include those found in the megalithic temples of Malta (which, like Stonehenge, are a UNESCO World Heritage Site), the Osireion in Egypt, and the Haʻamonga ʻa Maui in Tonga, Polynesia. The term is also used to describe the groups of three stones in the Hunebed tombs of the Netherlands.

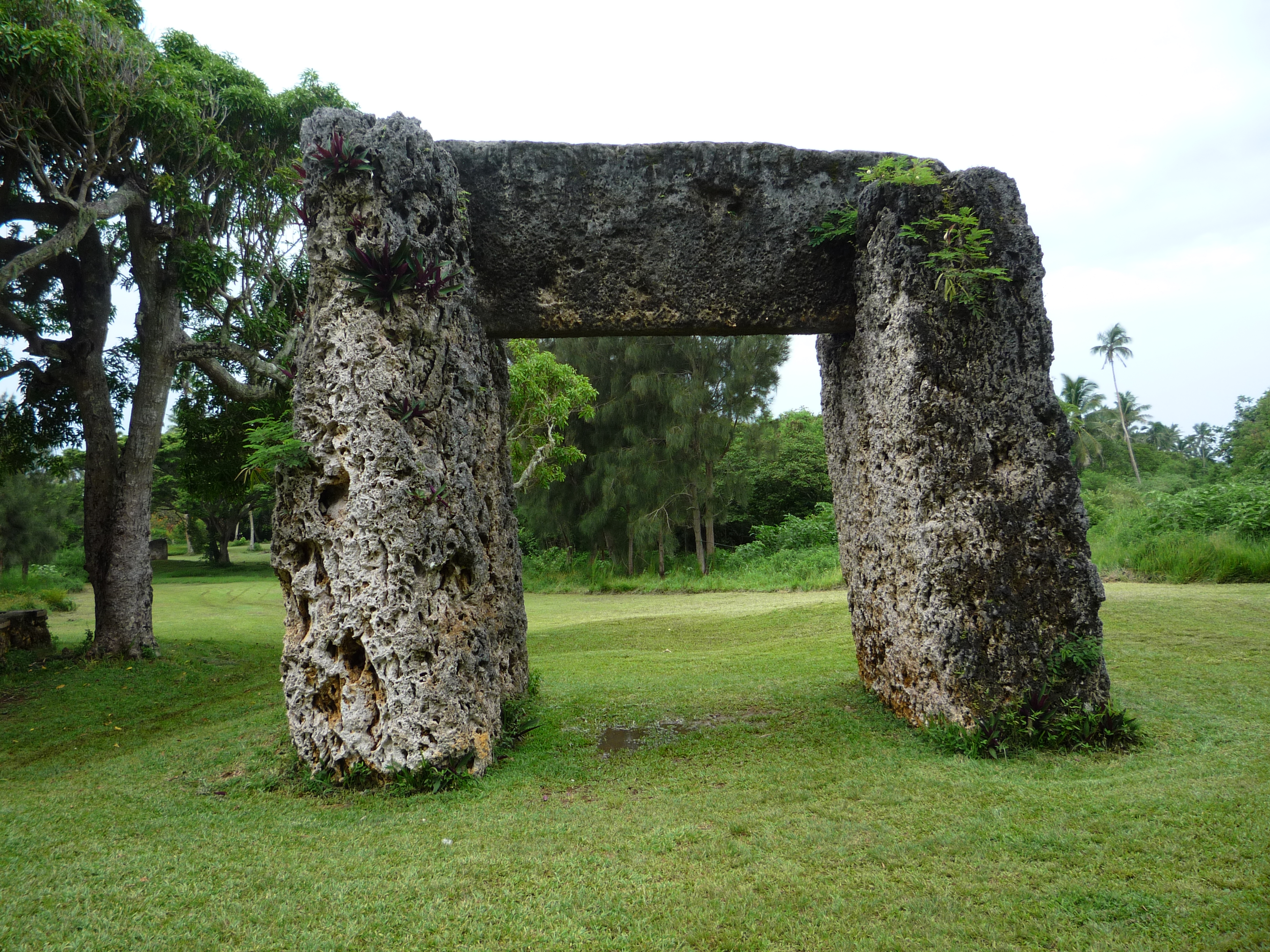
Haʻamonga ʻa Maui in Tonga

== See also ==
- Dolmen
- Henge
- Megalithic architectural elements
- Menhir (standing stone)
- Stonehenge of the Netherlands

== General sources ==
- Adam, Jean-Pierre (1977), "À propos du trilithon de Baalbek: Le transport et la mise en oeuvre des mégalithes" (PDF), Syria, 54 (1/2): 31–63, doi:10.3406/syria.1977.6623
- Gowland, W. (1902), "Recent Excavations at Stonehenge.", Man, 2: 22–26, doi:10.2307/2839874, ISSN 0025-1496, JSTOR 2839874
- Ruprechtsberger, Erwin M. (1999), "Vom Steinbruch zum Jupitertempel von Heliopolis/Baalbek (Libanon)", Linzer Archäologische Forschungen, 30: 7–56
- Yule, Paul A. (2014), Cross-roads: Early and Late Iron Age South-eastern Arabia, Abhandlungen der Deutschen Orient-Gesellschaft 30, Wiesbaden: Harrassowitz Verlag, pp. 73–77, doi:10.2307/j.ctvc2rmc8, ISBN 978-3-447-19287-3, JSTOR j.ctvc2rmc8
