= Tuʻi Tonga =

Line of Tongan kings

The Tuʻi Tonga was a line of Tongan kings, which originated in the tenth century with the mythical ʻAhoʻeitu, and withdrew from political power in the fifteenth century by yielding to the Tuʻi Haʻatakalaua. The title ended with the death of the last Tuʻi Tonga, Sanualio Fatafehi Laufilitonga, in 1865, who bequeathed the ancient title and its mana to his nephew, Fatafehi Tu'i Pelehake, who was the Tu'i Faleua, or Lord of the Second House (traditionally supposed to succeed to the office of the Tuʻi Tonga should the original line of kings perish without a natural successor). Tu'i Pelehake surrendered the title and its privileges to his father-in-law, King George Tupou I, who united its power and prestige with that of the Tu'i Kanokupolu, Tu'i Vava'u, and Tu'i Ha'apai titles to establish the modern-day institution of the Tongan Crown. Though the title is no longer conferred, the ancient line remains unbroken and is represented by the noble title of Kalaniuvalu (conferred by King George Tupou I on his nephew, Prince Fatafehi Kalaniuvalu, the only son born to the last Tuʻi Tonga, Laufilitonga, by the King's sister, Princess Luseane Halaevalu Moheofo, who was Laufilitonga's principal wife and consort).

Captain James Cook observed and recorded his accounts of the status and authority of the Tuʻi Tonga kings during his visits to what he described as the Friendly Isles.

== List of monarchs ==
Two lists of Tuʻi Tonga were collected; one by Catholic missionaries from Laufilitonga, the last to hold the title, encompassing 39 entries, and another by Wesleyan missionary Shirley Baker from Vealeʻovale, the sister of Queen Sālote Lupepauʻu, and Hepisipa, the daughter of Laufilitonga, which has 48 entries. The Baker list is considered less reliable as its ordering does not correspond with relationships given in various traditions and many of its names are seemingly alternative names for known kings. The list below is the one collected from Laufilitonga.

1. ʻAhoʻeitu – divine father, around 900 AD, resided first in Popua and then other places of the Hahake district, like Toloa near Fuaʻamotu.
2. Lolofakangalo
3. Fangaʻoneʻone
4. Līhau
5. Kofutu
6. Kaloa
7. Maʻuhau – residence in Lavengatonga
8. ʻApuanea
9. ʻAfulunga
10. Momo – married with Nua, the daughter of Loʻau, the Tuʻi Haʻamea. The Tongan maritime empire came into existence. Royal court in Heketā near Niutōua.
11. Tuʻitātui – around 1100 AD, extended the royal court, built the Haʻamonga; re-established the Fale Fā (house of four), royal counselors and guardians; his cunning stepbrother Fasiʻapule became a governor.
12. Talatama – shifted the residence to Lapaha; died without issue
13. Tuʻitonganui ko e Tamatou – said to have been a block of wood, standing in as child of Talatama and father of Talaihaʻapepe to keep the dynasty pure
14. Talaihaʻapepe – real brother of Talatama and supposed grandson through the woodblock
15. Talakaifaiki – around 1250; start of the decline of the Tongan maritime empire, lost Samoa due to his cruelty to the Mālietoa line
16. Talafāpite
17. Tuʻitonga Maʻakatoe
18. Tuʻitonga Puipui
19. Havea I – assassinated by a Fijian
20. Tatafuʻeikimeimuʻa
21. Lomiʻaetupuʻa
22. Havea II – assassinated with an arrow by Tuluvota, a Fijian
23. Takalaua – assassinated by Tamasia and Malofafa from ʻUvea and Futuna while taking his bath in the Tolopona stream at Alakifonua; a harsh ruler, start of political upheavals
24. Kauʻulufonua I – implemented political reforms in Tonga. Around 1470, pursued his father's murderers from Tongatapu to ʻEua, Haʻapai, Vavaʻu, both Niuas, then Niue, Fiji, Samoa, finally arresting them at their home island of either ʻUvea or Futuna. Back at home in Muʻa he killed them in a savage spectacle (knocking out their teeth and then letting them chew kava), before he devoured them giving him the nickname fekai. He allowed his younger brother Moʻungāmotuʻa to found a new dynasty, the Tuʻi Haʻatakalaua, named after their father. This new dynasty would carry out the day-to-day duties of the Tuʻi Tonga with the people while the Tuʻi Tonga became sacred, king of kings like a god.
25. Vakafuhu – kept away from Tonga by the Tuʻi Haʻatakalaua, lived in Samoa.
26. Puipuifatu – lived in Samoa, tried in vain to invade Vavaʻu to restore power to his dynasty
27. Kauʻulufonua II – lived in Samoa
28. Tapuʻosi – was allowed to return to Muʻa, as apparently the Tuʻi Tonga line was now so weakened as to be of no threat to the Tuʻi Haʻatakalaua. From now on the Tuʻi Tonga functioned as a kind of high priest, taking care of all religious obligations (an honour and a burden), giving him a very elevated status, but no worldly power. But no Tuʻi Tonga was ever murdered again.
29. ʻUluakimata I – also known as Teleʻa, builder of the greatest langi on Tongatapu
30. Fatafehi – around 1600, married the Tuʻi Haʻatakalaua Moʻunga ʻo Tonga's daughter, a custom which would last for some generations to come forming a permanent alliance between the two houses; his sister married a Fijian, changing the international orientation of Tonga from Samoa to Fiji. Was tattooed in Samoa by master tattooists in two sessions and received the nickname Fakauakimanuka ("Twice to Manuʻa") in commemoration of these rituals.
31. Kauʻulufonua III – was met by Abel Tasman in 1643
32. ʻUluakimata II
33. Tuʻipulotu (I) ʻilangi Tuʻofefafa - from now on the Tuʻi Tonga principal wife (moheofo) became the daughter of the Tuʻi Kanokupolu instead of the Tuʻi Haʻatakalaua, showing which dynasty of the latter two was now the most important
34. Fakanaʻanaʻa
35. Tuʻipolutu (II) ʻilangi Tuʻoteau
36. Pau - Fuanunuiava, was his successor during a grand ceremony in 1777, witnessed by Captain Cook; was defeated and deposed in a following civil war
37. Maʻulupekotofa - the older brother of Pau, who should have been Tuʻi Tonga in the first place without Pa; tried to reduce the burden of religious taboos grown on the Tuʻi Tonga and to increase its political influence
38. Fuanunuiava - took the power from his uncle in or around 1795, but continued his policy; joined Fīnau ʻUlukālala in the civil war of 1799; died in 1810
39. Laufilitonga - born around 1798; was too young to become Tuʻi Tonga when his father died; by that time the title had so declined as to have lost almost all prestige; tried to opt for power, but lost the final battle during Velata on Lifuka in 1826 against Tāufaʻāhau; was (together with the Tuʻi Kanokupolu) mockingly installed as Tuʻi Tonga in 1827 as a king with neither political nor spiritual power; died in 1865, after which the title was abolished in 1875.

== See also ==
- Tuʻi Tonga Empire
- History of Tonga

== Sources ==
- E. Bott; Tonga society at the time of Captain Cook's visit; 1982
- I.C. Campbell; Classical Tongan kingship; 1989
- ʻO. Māhina; Images from the history and culture of Tonga; 2006
