= Haʻamonga ʻa Maui =

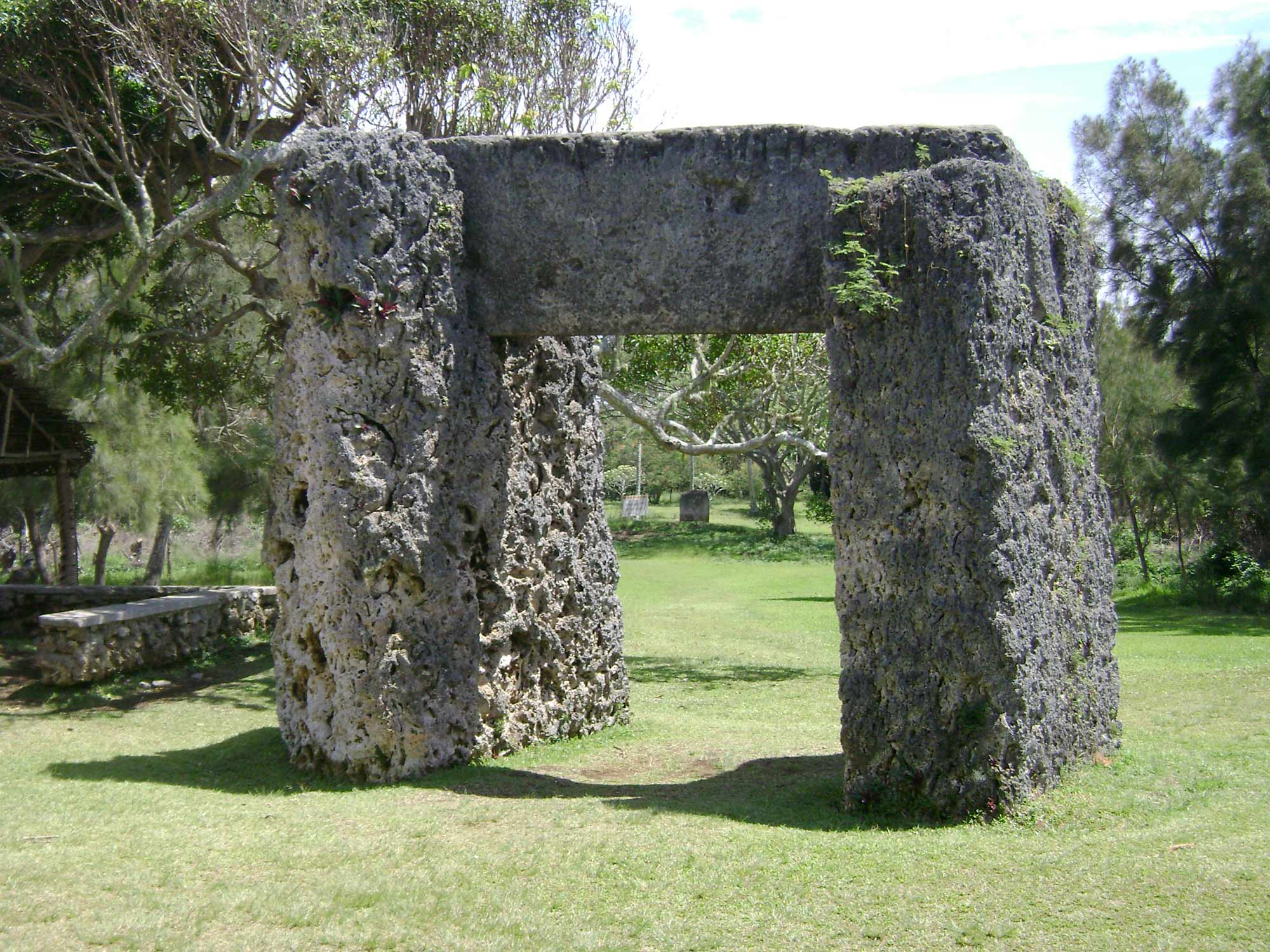
- Haʻamonga ʻa Maui with the Maka faakinanga stone throne visible in the distance

- Location within Tonga

General information
- Type: Trilithon
- Location: Tonga
- Coordinates: 21°08′12″S 175°02′53″W
- Completed: 13th century

Height
- Height: 5.2 m (17 ft)

Technical details
- Material: Coral limestone

Haʻamonga ʻa Maui ("The Burden of Maui") is a stone trilithon located in Tonga, on the eastern part of the island of Tongatapu, in the village of Niutōua, in Heketā. It was built in the 13th century by King Tuʻitātui in honor of his two sons. The monument is sometimes called the "Stonehenge of the Pacific".

== Etymology ==
The word haʻamonga means "a stick with loads on both ends, carried over the shoulder". Maui is a cultural hero in Polynesian mythology.

== Description ==
Ha'amonga 'a Maui is constructed from three coral limestone slabs. It is 5.2m high, 1.4m wide, and 5.8m long. The weight of the visible part of each upright stone is approximately 30–40 tons. Deep mortises are cut into the top of each upright stone to fit the lintel.

Near the trilithon is a stone throne called the ʻEsi maka faakinanga ("stone to lean against"). It was believed that when the king was seated with his back against the throne, he was safe from assassins who may sneak up behind him, and with his long stick he could hit every potential foe from the front on his knees.

== History ==
According to traditional accounts, the monument was made by the folk hero Maui, as the stones were thought to be too large for mortals to handle. Maui was supposed to have obtained the stones from ʻUvea Island, and carried them to Tonga in a giant canoe.

Historical analysis places its creation around 1200 AD, under Tuʻitātui, the eleventh Tuʻi Tonga (King of Tonga) and his high chief Loʻau, most likely as a gateway to Heketā, or the royal compound. It was built in honor of the king's two sons, who are represented by the two upright stones, and their bond represented by the lintel stone on top.

The monument and its surrounding areas were declared a protected national park in 1972. Some believe it's a marking to point the direction of pulotu the place of the gods in ancient Tongan legends.

== Astronomical significance ==
In 1967, King Taufa'ahau Tupou IV came to believe that Ha'amonga 'a Maui had an astronomical significance, telling the position of sunrise at solstices and equinoxes. This theory is supported by the research of Tongan historian Tevita Fale. According to Tevita Fale, there is a V-shaped mark on top of the lintel that aligns with the rising of the sun during the solstices and equinoxes.

C F Velt, an astronomer at 'Atenisi Institute, disagrees with the findings of King Taufa'ahau Tupou IV and Tevita Fale. Velt argues that the V on top is an arrow directed along the main axis of the lintel (about ESE, 117°5 E of N), only 10 cm long, too short to be a reliable indicator of any direction.

== Gallery ==
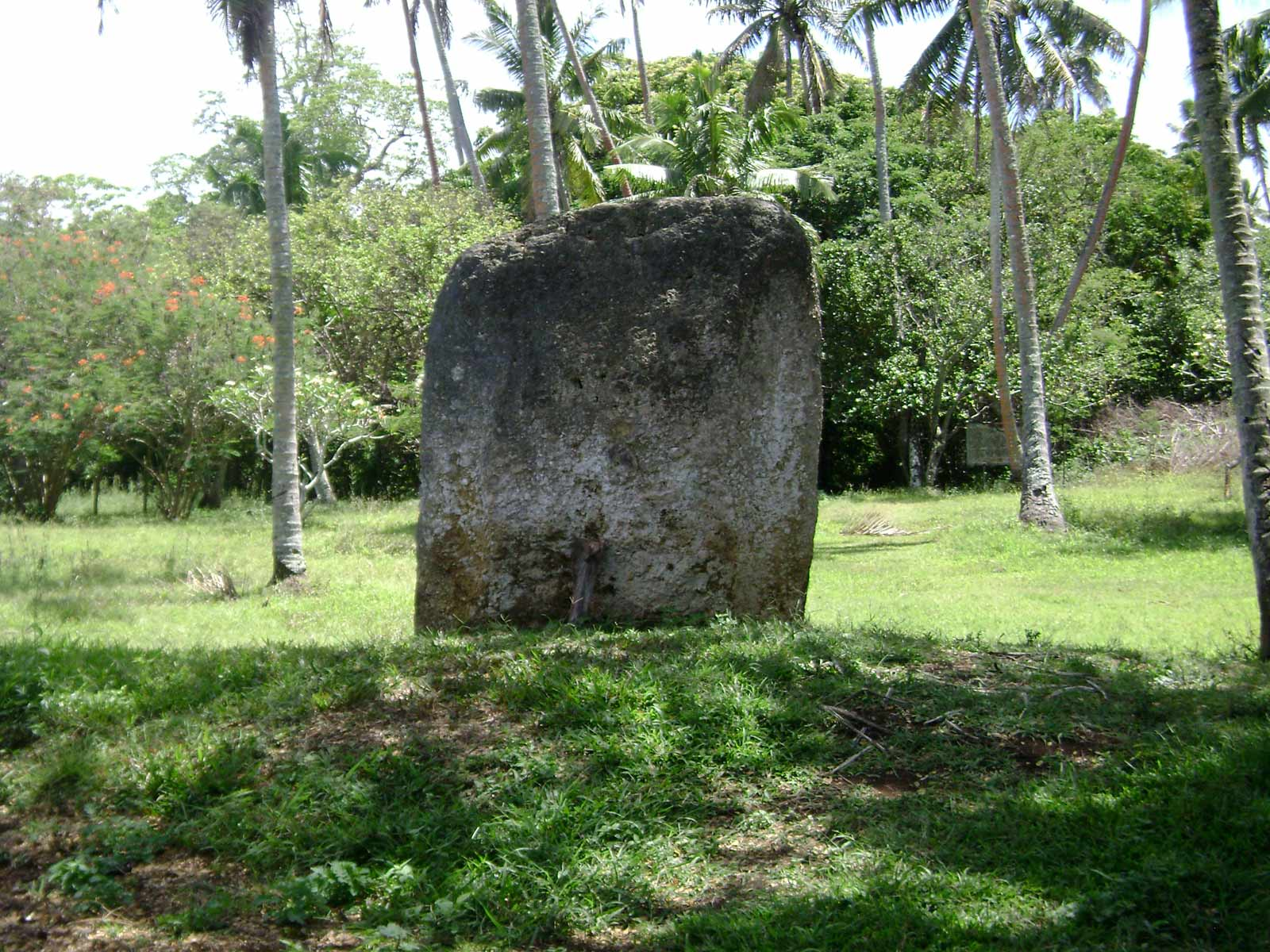
Maka faakinanga stone throne

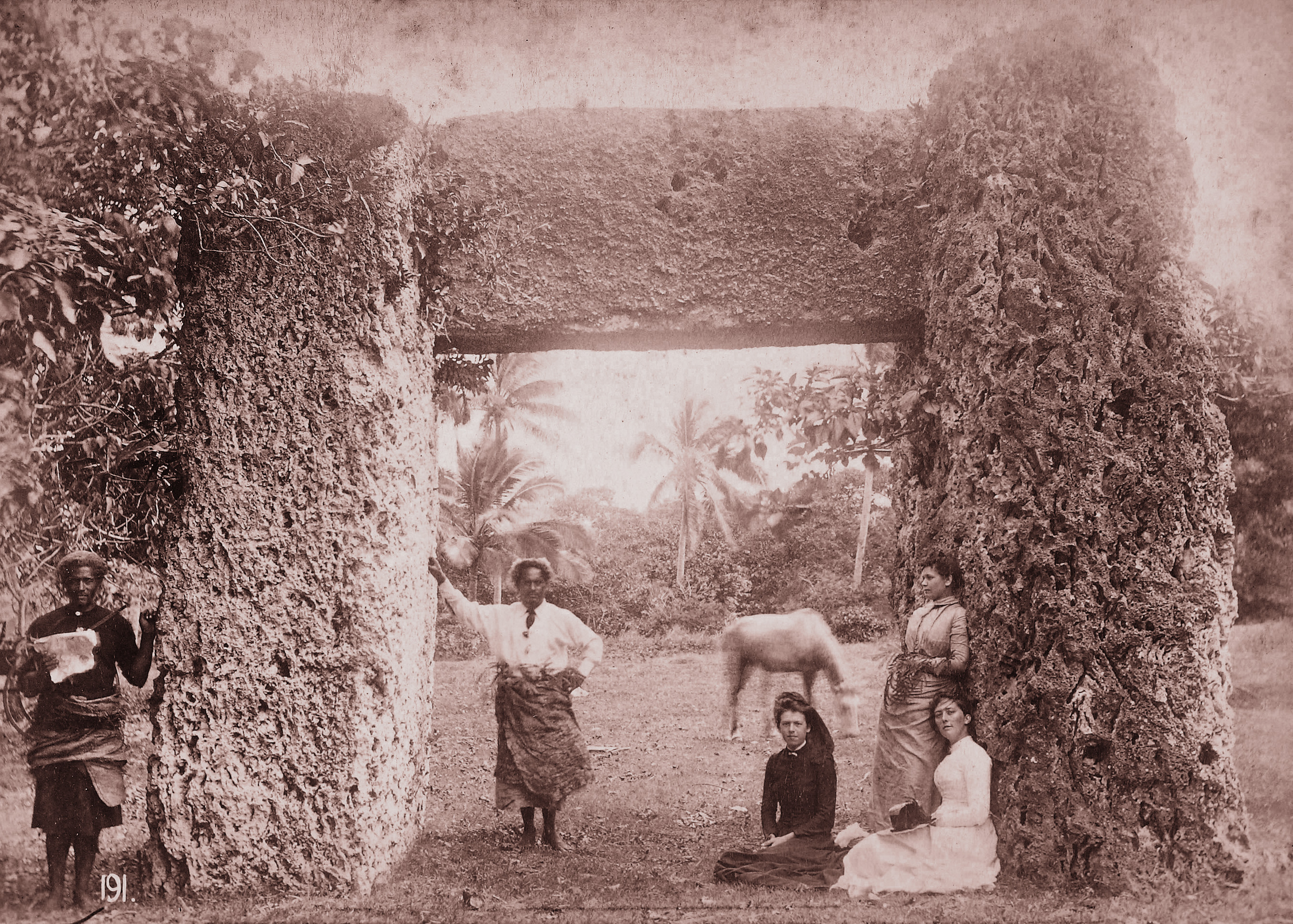
Photograph from the 1880s, front view

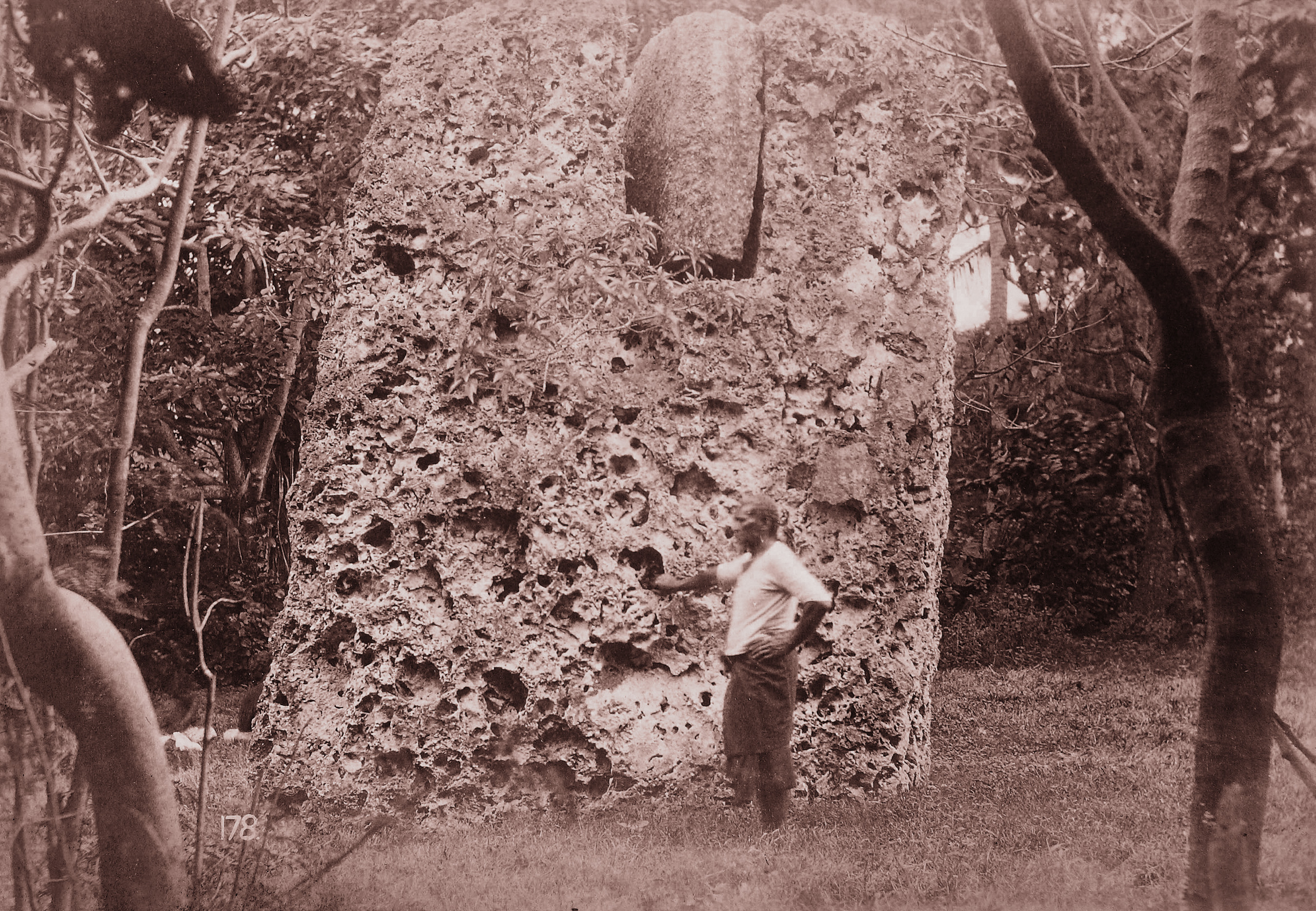
Photograph from the 1880s, side view

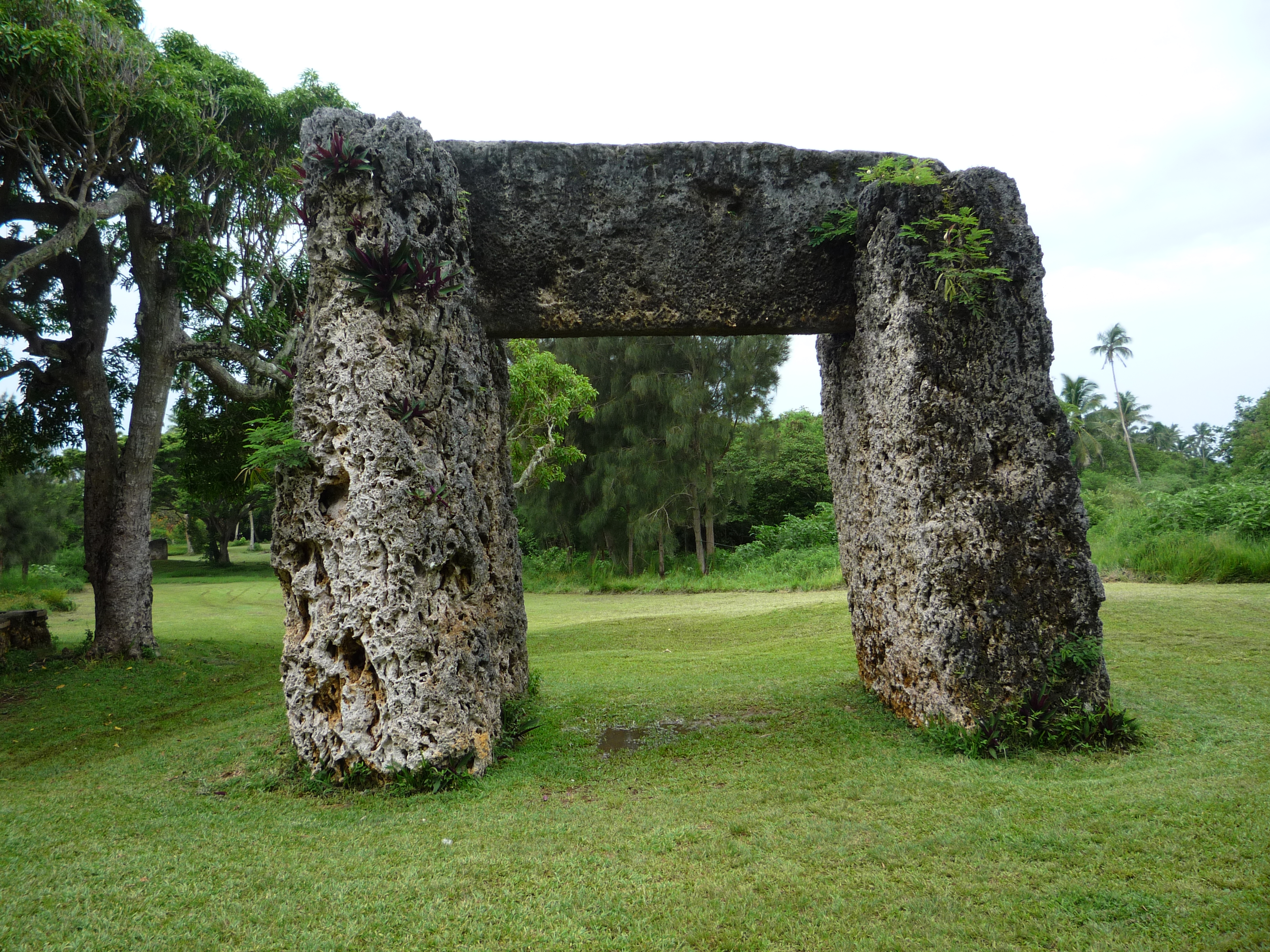

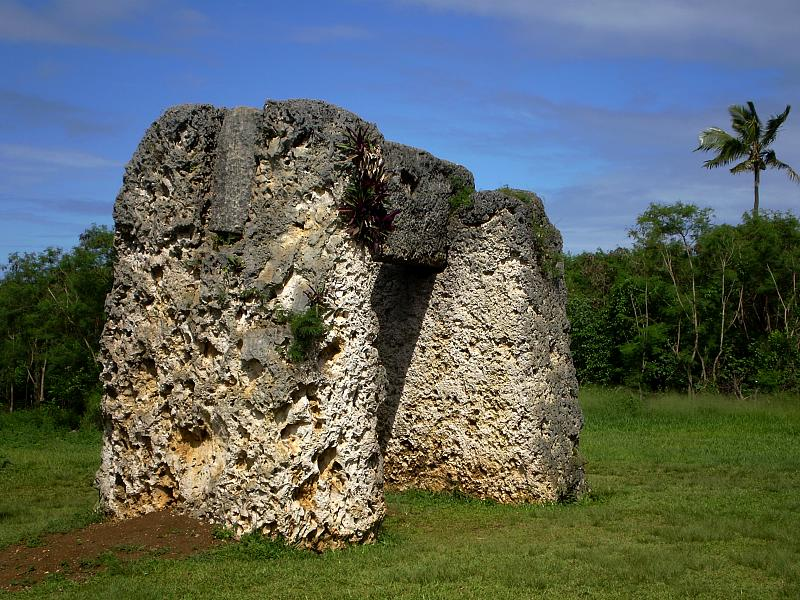
