= Niutoua =

Village in Tongatapu, Tonga

Coordinates: 21.142°S 175.043°W

Niutoua is a village in Tongatapu, Tonga. It is located close to the Ha'amonga 'a Maui stone on the extreme northeast corner of the island. It is located near Heketā, the second capital of the Tuʻi Tonga Empire. It had a population of 671 in 2016.

Niutoua was the famous residence of the Tu'itonga. Before Niutoua. It was called Heketa.

Places of Interest:

- Ha'amonga a Maui (Uasila'a)
- Maka Faakinanga - Tokotoko ko ta'ofi tangata
- Siale Hae Vala (Siale Fakatoupikoi)
- Tuitui a Tamale
- Maka Fekau
- Tukunga'akau ta
- Vai tu'u lilo (Fakalongo-ki-kafa)
- Fanga ko Fele-a-kie
- Hala Silopa
- Utulongoa'a

Utulongoa'a: From the Ha'amonga trilithon, behind sits the Maka Faakinanga or the leaning rock in which Tu'itatui leant on. It was like his throne. Behind this Throne was the ancient residence of Heketa. Behind this residence is the Utulongoa'a or "noisy cliff". It has been confirmed by Tamale Maka but also Nuku Moimoiangaha that the Utulongoa'a has originated from Niutoua but the name was gifted to Nuku's first son whose mother was Tamale's daughter. Before the King's daughter Fatafehi moved to Lapaha, she stayed in Heketa. But moved because of the noisy cliffs.
