= Langi (burial) =

Burial sites in Tonga

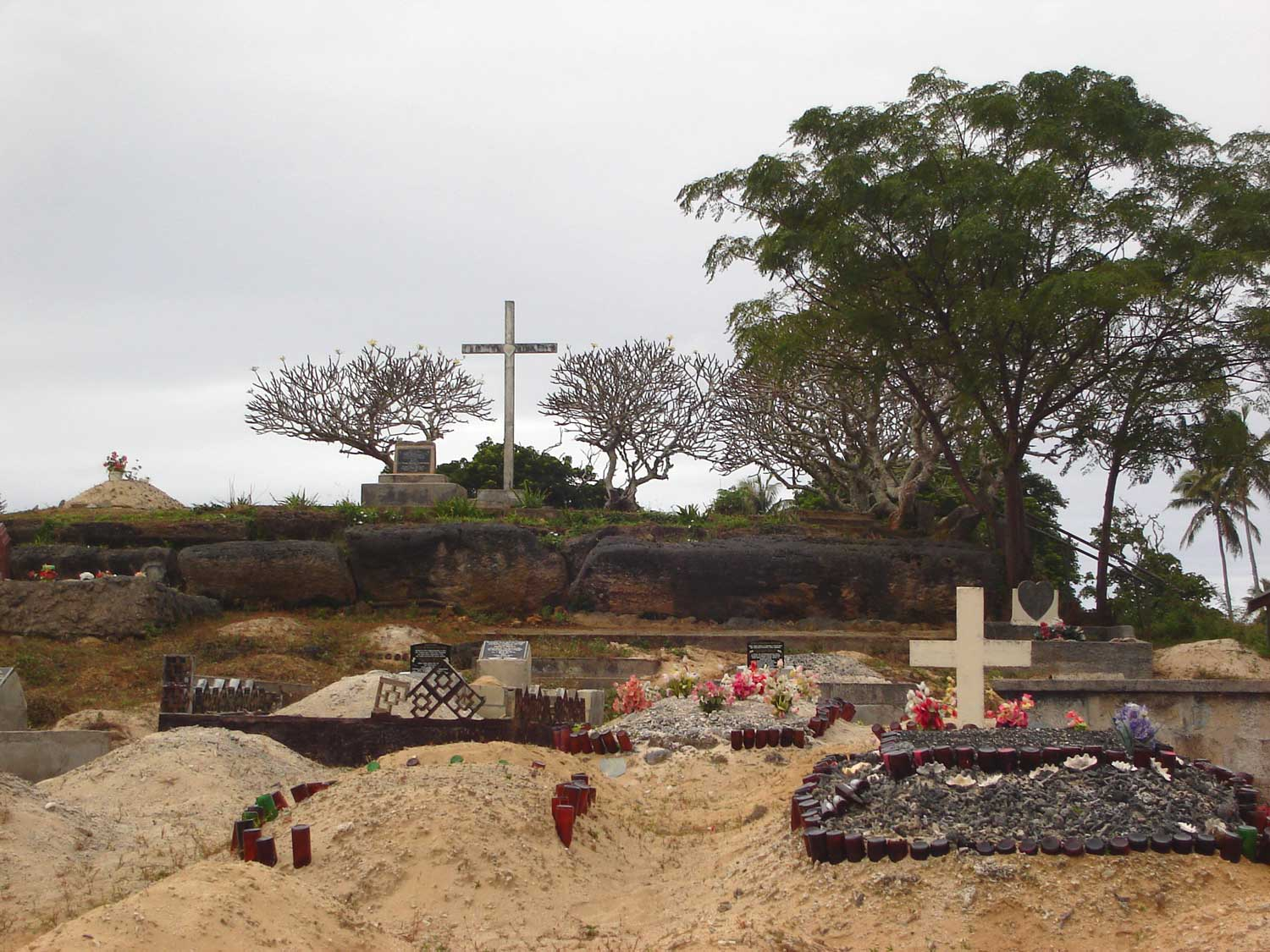
Langi Tuʻofefafa, with a cemetery at its base

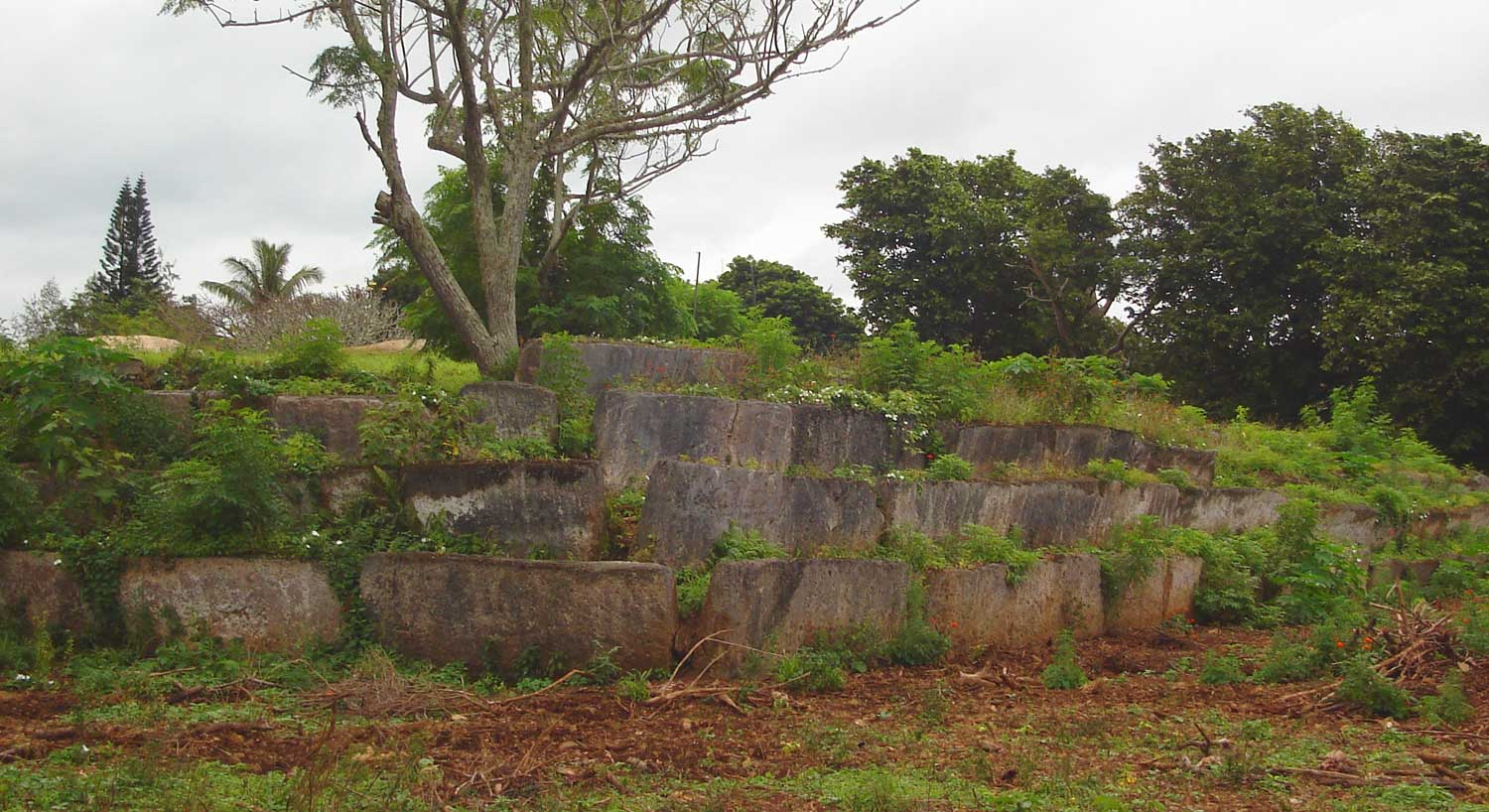
Langi Tauʻatonga

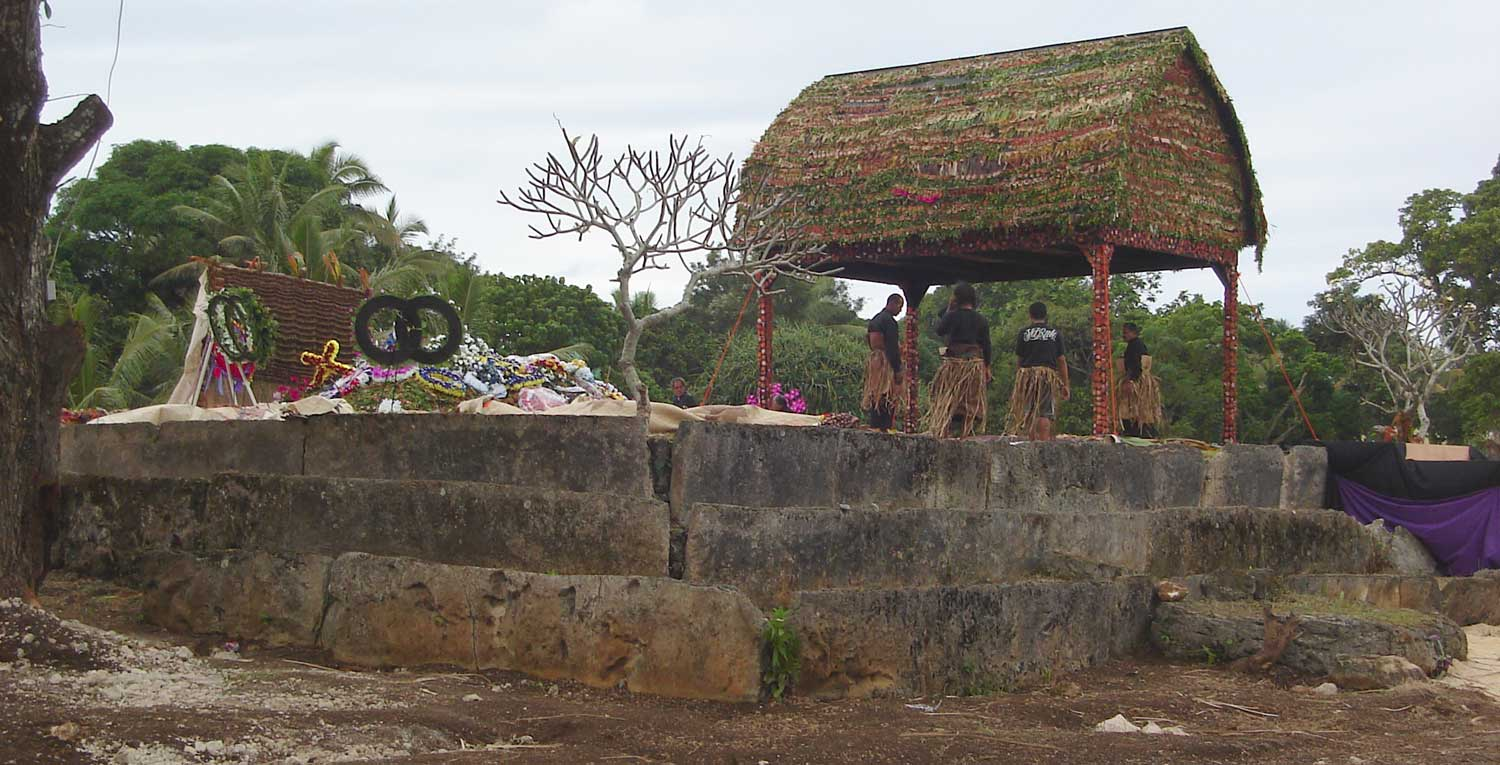
Langi Nā Moala, after the funeral of the Tuʻipelehake

Langi are large, artificial hills surrounded by huge slabs of coral rock, usually in three or more tiered layers. These slabs were quarried from several places along the coast of Tongatapu or neighbouring minor islands. The waves of the sea made them over the centuries, by compacting coral sand into layers of 10 to 20 centimetres (3.9 to 7.9 inches) thick. They were only to be dug out and then transported by boat to the building site. The slabs were cut precisely to shape so that they fit along each other with barely any space to spare.

== Description ==
Whatever political power the Tuʻi Tonga yielded to their rivals, they gained in spiritual power, and as a kind of high priest they were perhaps even more awesome than as kings. When a Tuʻi Tonga died he was buried in one of the langi, of which there are still at least two dozen in Lapaha. The Tuʻi Haʻatakalaua were also buried in such tombs, but they are called fale instead.

One of the best-preserved langi is the Paepae-o-Teleʻa.

The story that the slabs were moved by magic means from ʻUvea to Tonga is a myth. ʻUvea is volcanic and is geologically unsuitable. This fact has always been known, as shown, for example by a stanza of the poem named Laveofo from around the 18th century by Tufui.

Ko e Pangaimotu mo Makahaʻa tuʻu mai ʻa e motu ko Fafā naʻe fai ai e tā maka ʻo uta ki Langi Taetaea mo e ʻotu langi fua ʻo Muʻa	The islands Pangaimotu and Makahaʻa and standing here the island of Fafā where the cutting of stone was done and taken to the mound Taetaea and the whole row of mounds of Muʻa

The last Tuʻi Tonga, Laufiltonga, was buried in langi Tuʻofefafa. Having died as a Catholic, his grave is marked with a huge cross.

The langi are still used nowadays as burial sites. When the Kalaniuvalu chief died in 1999 he was buried in the Paepae o Teleʻa. When the Tuʻi Pelehake chief, ʻUluvalu and his wife Kaimana died in 2006, they were buried in langi Nā Moala.

The remaining groundworks of an old, deserted fort remain on the border of Talasiu and Lapaha.

== List ==
According to the matāpule Makalangahiva (variations by other informants) Langi Pyramids in the Kingdom of Tonga and the Pacific.

1. Langi Tuʻo teau
2. Langi Kātoa
3. Langi Fanakava ki langi
4. Langi Tuʻo fefafa
5. Langi Tau ʻa tonga
6. Langi Malu ʻa tonga
7. Langi Leka
8. Langi Sinai
9. Langi Taetaea
10. Langi Faʻapite
11. Langi Tōfā ua
12. Langi Nukulau ʻuluaki
13. Langi Nukulau ua
14. Langi Foʻou
15. Langi Hahake
16. Langi ʻo Luani
17. Langi Tauhala
18. Langi Paepae ʻo Teleʻa (or Paepae o Teleʻa)
19. Langi Nā Moala
20. Langi Hēhēa
21. Langi ʻEsi ʻa e kona
22. Langi Malomaloaʻa
23. Langi Nakuli ki langi
24. Fale Loʻāmanu
25. Fale Fakauō
26. Fale Tui(nga)papai
27. Fale Pulemālō
28. Fale Tauhakeleva
29. Tangaloa's Langi Talanga
30. Langi Makamaka
31. Langi Manoa
32. Langi Fefine
33. Langi Tevolo
34. Langi Fine Pani Lolo
35. Langi Kakala
36. Langi Lamatavake
37. Langi Matangi
38. Langi Vakatau
39. Langi Pa Tonga Pulemelei (Samoa)
40. Langi Taveuni (Fisi)
41. Langi Letoka (Vanuatu)
42. Langi Anuta (Solomone Luangiua)
43. Langi Ahu o Tongariki (Rapanui Easter Island)
44. Langi Arae Te Tonga (Cook Island)
45. Langi Tuo hiva (Samoa)
46. Langi o Tefolaha (Tuvalu)
47. Langi o Falealupo (Tuvalu)
48. Langi Fatani Tawake (Fisi)
