= Muʻa (Tongatapu) =

Town on the island of Tongatapu

Coordinates: 21°10′45″S 175°07′0″W

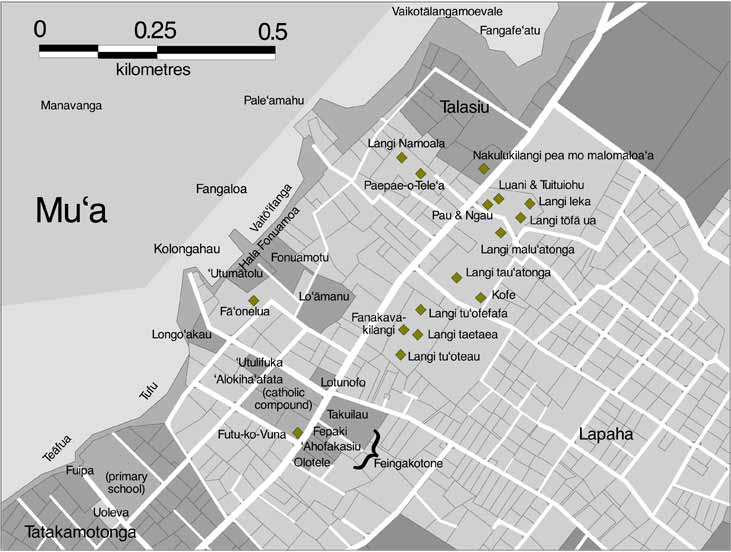
Map of Lapaha with locations relevant to the Tuʻi Tonga dynasty. All diamonds (except the Fāʻonelua tree and the Futu-ko-Vuna tree and stone) indicate the location of a langi. Different authorities disagree about the exact identifications, though

Muʻa is a small town in the Hahake (eastern) district on the island of Tongatapu, and it was for centuries the ancient capital of the Tuʻi Tonga Empire. It is divided in the villages Lapaha and Tatakamotonga, is close to Talasiu and famous for the ancient langi (royal burial tombs).

== Geography ==
Muʻa is situated along the eastern side of the lagoon of Tongatapu. Except for a 50-to-200-metre-wide (160 to 660 ft) zone along the shore which was once mangrove-ridden swamplands, now largely landfilled with stones, the remainder of the settlement is on high-lying red volcanic soil of high fertility. Muʻa is flanked along the east by high terrain atop of which the village of Lapaha is situated, while immediately bordering the south of Muʻa is the much larger town of Tatakamotonga. Adjacent to the north, but not considered part of Muʻa, is the village of Talasiu.

== Demography ==
According to the 1996 census there were 3,900 people living Muʻa, a number expected to rise to 4,900 if confirmed by the November 2006 census.

Most people of Lapaha are Catholic, while Tatakamotonga is largely Wesleyan, although both see an increasing number of members of The Church of Jesus Christ of Latter-day Saints. This has a historical reason: the last Tuʻi Tonga was Roman Catholic and lived in Lapaha.

Tatakamotonga has a government primary school in the northwestern part of the village and a high school run by the Wesleyan church (Tapunisiliva, eastern branch of Tupou high school) in the northeast. Lapaha has a government primary school and a high school run by the Roman Catholic Church (Takuilau) at the eastern end of the village.

== History ==
Muʻa was at one time the center of Lapita culture in Tonga (about 2,000 years ago) and later (twelfth to sixteenth century CE) the capital of the Tuʻi Tonga Empire. After the disintegration of the empire it remained the capital of the Tuʻi Tonga (Tonga kings), up to the nineteenth century, but was rather a spiritual centre and no longer a source of political power.

The Tuʻi Tonga and his retinue stayed in Lapaha, his residence being Olotele and ʻAhofakasiu, while Takuilau was for his wives (not to be confused with the current high school of the same name but further to the east). Subchiefs and servants on the other hand lived in Tatakamotonga.

When, around 1470, the Tuʻi Tonga line started to lose power to the Tuʻi Haʻatakalaua, and another century later to the Tuʻi Kanokupolu, chiefs belonging to these lines were not welcome in Muʻa, and had to stay on the low-lying coastal areas, separated from the 'real' chiefs (i.e. those belonging to the Tuʻi Tonga) by the Hala Fonuamoa (dry land road). The former became known as the kauhalalalo (low road people) and the latter as the kauhalaʻuta (inland road people), which nowadays are still two important moieties in Tonga.

== Fāʻonelua ==
The nickname of Lapaha is Paki mo e toʻi (picked with sap), referring to the many sweet smelling flowers which were to be picked regularly to be made into kahoa, (flower garlands) for the lords. Likewise Tatakamotonga is also known as Kolokakala (fragrant town) and other variants of this name.

An important tree with beautiful red flowers grew (and still grows) on the coastal marshland. Its name is Fāʻonelua and it is a unique species of mangrove. Only the Tuʻi Tonga was allowed to wear its flowers as a garland, and as such the name has become a symbol for his reign.

== Notable people ==
- Ronald Fotofili, Olympic sprinter from Lapaha
- Polikalepo Kefu, human rights activist from Lapaha
