= 2016 in Tonga =

- Decades: 1990s; 2000s; 2010s; 2020s
- See also: Other events of 2016; Timeline of Tongan history

Events in the year 2016 in Tonga.

== Incumbents ==
- Monarch: Tupou VI
- Prime Minister: ʻAkilisi Pōhiva

== Events ==
- 16 January: From the Diocese of Tonga, Catholic Cardinal Soane Patita Paini Mafi is welcomed at the Co-Cathedral of Saint Theresa of the Child Jesus in Honolulu, Hawaii. Appointed by Pope Francis, Mafi is the first and youngest cardinal from Tonga.
- 4 February: Tonga declares a Zika virus epidemic with two confirmed cases and 265 suspected cases.

== Deaths ==
- 23 April: Bill Sevesi, 92, Tongan-born New Zealand musician.
