= 2013 in Tonga =

- Decades: 1990s; 2000s; 2010s; 2020s
- See also: Other events of 2013; Timeline of Tongan history

The following lists events that happened during 2013 in Tonga.

== Incumbents ==
- Monarch: Tupou VI
- Prime Minister: Sialeʻataongo Tuʻivakanō

== Events ==
- 14 March: Real Tonga was founded.
- 16 May: The Nakolo Wind Turbine, the first wind farm in Tonga, is commissioned in Tongatapu.

== Deaths ==
- 10 February: Baron Fielakepa, 51, government minister.
- 13 August: Sonatane Tuʻa Taumoepeau-Tupou, 70, politician and diplomat, Foreign Minister (2004–2009).
- 24 December: Soane Lilo Foliaki, 80, Roman Catholic prelate, Bishop of Tonga (1994–2008).
