= 2006 in Tonga =

- Decades: 1980s; 1990s; 2000s; 2010s; 2020s
- See also: Other events of 2006; Timeline of Tongan history

The following lists events that happened during 2006 in the Kingdom of Tonga.

== Incumbents ==
- Monarch: Tupou VI
- Prime Minister: Tupou VI (until 11 February), Feleti Sevele (starting 11 February)

== Events ==
=== July ===
- July 1 - A man is arrested after crashing a car into the gates of King Taufa'ahau Tupou IV's residence in Auckland, New Zealand.

=== November ===
- November 16 - Riots begin in Nuku'alofa after a crowd of democracy advocates protested against the lack of government action.
