= 2018 in Tonga =

- Decades: 1990s; 2000s; 2010s; 2020s
- See also: Other events of 2018; Timeline of Tongan history

The following events occurred in Tonga in the year 2018.

== Incumbents ==
- Monarch: Tupou VI
- Prime Minister: ʻAkilisi Pōhiva

== Events ==
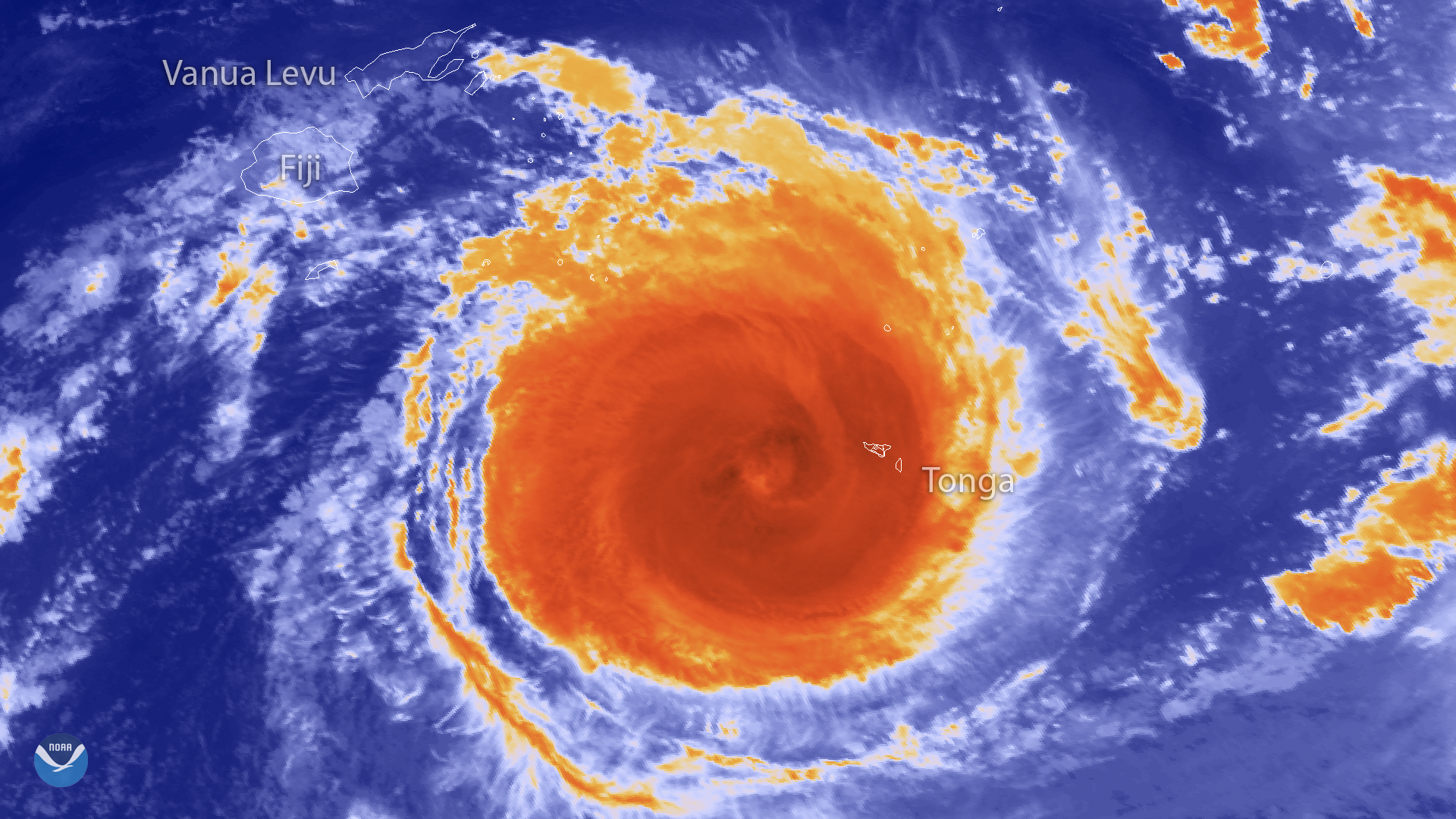
Enhanced infrared satellite image of the Cyclone Gita off the coast of Tonga on 12 February

- 12 February – Tonga was hit by the Cyclone Gita, the strongest cyclone to strike Tonga in its recorded history, with winds of up to 195km/h.

=== Sports ===
- 9 to 25 February – Tonga participated at the 2018 Winter Olympics in PyeongChang, South Korea, represented by a single athlete, cross-country skier Pita Taufatofua.
