= 2015 in Tonga =

- Decades: 1990s; 2000s; 2010s; 2020s
- See also: Other events of 2015; Timeline of Tongan history

The following lists events that happened during 2015 in Tonga.

== Incumbents ==
- Monarch: Tupou VI
- Prime Minister: ʻAkilisi Pōhiva

== Events ==
=== January ===
- January 12 - The eruption of the Hunga Tonga volcano disrupts flights to and from Tonga.
- January 16 - The explosion of the Hunga Tonga submerged volcano near Tonga creates a new island.
