= 2017 in Tonga =

- Decades: 1990s; 2000s; 2010s; 2020s
- See also: Other events of 2017; Timeline of Tongan history

Events in the year 2017 in Tonga.

== Incumbents ==
- Monarch: Tupou VI
- Prime Minister: ʻAkilisi Pōhiva

== Events ==
February 2017 - The launch of the first climate change fund to enabled organizations to participate in strengthening climate resilience across the country.

June 2017 - the World Health Organisation announces that Tonga has eliminated lymphatic filariasis as a public health problem.

November 2017 - First National Tsunami evacuation drill in multiple islands for the public in case of major earthquakes and tsunamis.

November 25, 2017 - Tonga makes it to the semifinals of the 2017 Rugby League World Cup, the first time this had happened in the country’s history.

== Deaths ==
- 12 February - Sione Lauaki
- 19 February – Halaevalu Mataʻaho ʻAhomeʻe, royal (b. 1926).
- August - Fatafehi Fuatakifolaha
