= 2026 in Tonga =

- Decades: 2000s; 2010s; 2020s
- See also: Other events of 2026; Timeline of Tongan history

Events in the year 2026 in Tonga.

== Incumbents ==
- Monarch: Tupou VI
- Prime Minister: Fatafehi Fakafānua

== Events ==
- 15 April – Finance minister Lataifaingataʻa Tangimana resigns after being convicted of indirect bribery during the 2025 elections.
- 8 October:
  - 2026 Niua 17 by-election
  - 2026 Tongatapu 2 by-election
- 19 November – Tonga declares a 21-day state of emergency in response to a drought caused by El Niňo.

== Holidays ==
- 1 January – New Year's Day
- 3 April – Good Friday
- 6 April – Easter Monday
- 25 April – Anzac Day
- 2 June – Emancipation Day
- 4 July – King Tupou IV Day
- 17 September – Crown Prince's Birthday
- 4 November – Constitution Day
- 4 December – King Tupou I Day
- 25 December – Christmas Day
- 26 December – Boxing Day
