= Nakolo Wind Turbine =

Wind farm in Tongatapu, Tonga

- Country: Tonga
- Location: Tongatapu, Tonga
- Coordinates: 21°15′56.4″S 175°07′08.1″W
- Status: Operational
- Commission date: 16 May 2013
- Construction cost: US$120 million
- Operator: Tonga Power

Wind farm
- Hub height: 18.4 m
- Rotor diameter: 26 m

Power generation
- Nameplate capacity: 11 kW
- Annual net output: 27 MWh

The Nakolo Wind Turbine is a wind turbine in Tongatapu, Tonga. It is the first wind turbine in the country.

== History ==
The wind turbine was commissioned on 16 May 2013 as the first wind turbine constructed in Tonga.

== Technical specifications ==
The wind turbine has an installed capacity of 11 kW and generates 27 MWh of electricity annually. The wind turbine has a hub height of 18.4 m and wind diameter of 26 m.

== See also ==
- Economy of Tonga
