= 2019 in Tonga =

- Decades: 1990s; 2000s; 2010s; 2020s
- See also: Other events of 2019; Timeline of Tongan history

Events in the year 2019 in Tonga.

== Incumbents ==
- Monarch: Tupou VI
- Prime Minister: ʻAkilisi Pōhiva (until 12 September), Semisi Sika (acting, from 12 September until 8 October), Pohiva Tuʻiʻonetoa (from 8 October)

== Events ==
=== October ===
- Metis Shoal, a volcanic island at the top of a submarine volcano between Kao and Late disappears during an eruption which is first reported on the morning of 14 October. A new and bigger island appears nearby.

== Deaths ==
- 12 September – ʻAkilisi Pōhiva, Prime Minister (b. 1941).
