= 2014 in Tonga =

- Decades: 1990s; 2000s; 2010s; 2020s
- See also: Other events of 2014; Timeline of Tongan history

The following lists events that happened during 2014 in Tonga.

== Incumbents ==
- Monarch: Tupou VI
- Prime Minister: Sialeʻataongo Tuʻivakanō (until December 30), ʻAkilisi Pōhiva (starting December 30)

== Events ==
=== January ===
- January 11 - Cyclone Ian strikes Tonga with damage to buildings reported.
- January 13 - Tonga restores contact with the Ha'apai islands after Cyclone Ian passed through during the weekend, killing one person and significantly damaging structures.

=== July ===
- July 3 - The government of Tonga reveals a proposal to trade the disputed Minerva Reefs to Fiji in exchange for the Lau Islands, in an effort to settle a decades-old territorial dispute between the two Pacific countries.

=== November ===
- November 27 - General election
