= 1845 =

1845 in various calendars
- Gregorian calendar: 1845; MDCCCXLV
- Ab urbe condita: 2598
- Armenian calendar: 1294; ԹՎ ՌՄՂԴ
- Assyrian calendar: 6595
- Baháʼí calendar: 1–2
- Balinese saka calendar: 1766–1767
- Bengali calendar: 1251–1252
- Berber calendar: 2795
- British Regnal year: 8 Vict. 1 – 9 Vict. 1
- Buddhist calendar: 2389
- Burmese calendar: 1207
- Byzantine calendar: 7353–7354
- Chinese calendar: 甲辰年 (Wood Dragon); 4542 or 4335 — to — 乙巳年 (Wood Snake); 4543 or 4336
- Coptic calendar: 1561–1562
- Discordian calendar: 3011
- Ethiopian calendar: 1837–1838
- Hebrew calendar: 5605–5606
- Hindu calendars
- Vikram Samvat: 1901–1902
- Shaka Samvat: 1766–1767
- Kali Yuga: 4945–4946
- Holocene calendar: 11845
- Igbo calendar: 845–846
- Iranian calendar: 1223–1224
- Islamic calendar: 1260–1262
- Japanese calendar: Kōka 2 (弘化２年)
- Javanese calendar: 1772–1773
- Julian calendar: Gregorian minus 12 days
- Korean calendar: 4178
- Minguo calendar: 67 before ROC 民前67年
- Nanakshahi calendar: 377
- Thai solar calendar: 2387–2388
- Tibetan calendar: ཤིང་ཕོ་འབྲུག་ལོ་ (male Wood-Dragon); 1971 or 1590 or 818 — to — ཤིང་མོ་སྦྲུལ་ལོ་ (female Wood-Snake); 1972 or 1591 or 819

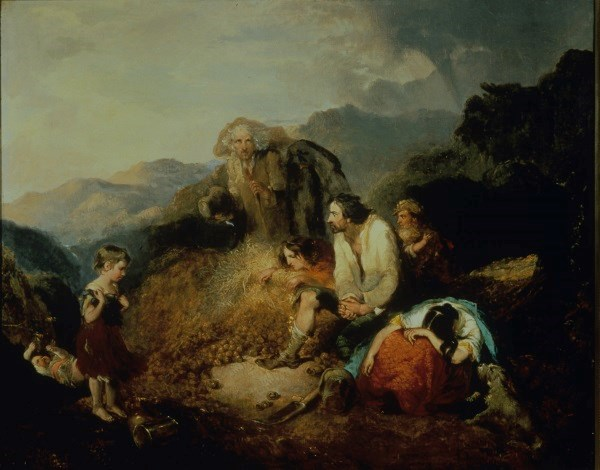
September 9: Potato crops ruined in Ireland, starting the Great Famine.

March 1: U.S. annexes territory of the Republic of Texas.

1845 (MDCCCXLV) was a common year starting on Wednesday of the Gregorian calendar and a common year starting on Monday of the Julian calendar, the 1845th year of the Common Era (CE) and Anno Domini (AD) designations, the 845th year of the 2nd millennium, the 45th year of the 19th century, and the 6th year of the 1840s decade. As of the start of 1845, the Gregorian calendar was 12 days ahead of the Julian calendar, which remained in localized use until 1923.

== Events ==
=== January–March ===
- January 1 – The Philippines began reckoning Asian dates by hopping the International Date Line through skipping Tuesday, December 31, 1844. That time zone shift was a reform made by Governor–General Narciso Claveria on August 16, 1844, in order to align the local calendars in the country with the rest of Asia as trade interests with Imperial China, Dutch East Indies and neighboring countries increased, after Mexico became independent in 1821. The reform also applied to Caroline Islands, Guam, Marianas Islands, Marshall Islands, and Palau as part of the Captaincy General of the Philippines.
- January 10 – Elizabeth Barrett receives a love letter from the younger poet Robert Browning; on May 20, they meet for the first time in London. She begins writing her Sonnets from the Portuguese.
- January 23 – The United States Congress establishes a uniform date for federal elections, which will henceforth be held on the first Tuesday after the first Monday in November.
- January 29 – The Raven by Edgar Allan Poe is published for the first time, in the New York Evening Mirror.
- February 1 – Anson Jones, President of the Republic of Texas, signs the charter officially creating Baylor University (the oldest university in the U.S. state of Texas that still operates under its original name).
- February 7 – A drunken visitor smashes the Portland Vase in the British Museum, requiring months of repair work.
- February 28 – The United States Congress approves the annexation of Texas.
- March 1 – President John Tyler signs a bill authorizing the United States to annex the Republic of Texas, subject to approval by the voters in the Republic. The territory claimed includes all of the future U.S. state of Texas, as well as portions of New Mexico, Oklahoma, Kansas, Colorado and Wyoming.
- March 3 – Florida is admitted as the 27th U.S. state. On the same day, both houses of the U.S. Congress vote by a two-thirds majority, to override a presidential veto for the first time in history in order to pass legislation.
- March 11 – The New Zealand Wars open with the Flagstaff War. Chiefs Kawiti and Hōne Heke lead 700 Maoris in the burning of the British colonial settlement of Kororareka (modern-day Russell, New Zealand).
- March 13 – The Violin Concerto by Felix Mendelssohn premieres in Leipzig, with Ferdinand David as soloist.
- March 17 – Stephen Perry patents the rubber band, in the United Kingdom.

=== April–June ===
- April 7 – An earthquake destroys part of Mexico City, along with the nearby towns of Tlalpan and Xochimilco.
- April 10 – The Great Fire of Pittsburgh destroys much of the American city of Pittsburgh.
- April 20 – Ramón Castilla becomes president of Peru.
- May 2 – Yarmouth suspension bridge in Great Yarmouth, England, collapses leaving around 80 dead, mostly children.
- May 19 – HMS Erebus and HMS Terror, with 134 men, comprising Sir John Franklin's expedition to find the Northwest Passage, sail from Greenhithe on the Thames. They will last be seen in the summer, entering Baffin Bay.
- May 25 – A theater fire in Canton, China, kills 1,670.
- May 30 – Fatel Razack (Fath Al Razack, 'Victory of Allah the Provider', Arabic: قتح الرزاق) is the first ship to bring indentured labourers from India to Trinidad and Tobago, landing in the Gulf of Paria with 227 immigrants.
- May – Frederick Douglass's autobiographical Narrative of the Life of Frederick Douglass, an American Slave is published by the Boston Anti-Slavery Society.
- June 8 – Former U.S. President Andrew Jackson, 78, dies at The Hermitage (Nashville, Tennessee).

=== July–September ===
- July 26–August 10 – Isambard Kingdom Brunel's iron steamship Great Britain makes the transatlantic crossing from Liverpool to New York, the first screw propelled vessel to make the passage.
- July 28 – HMS Terror and HMS Erebus of the Franklin Expedition go missing in the Davis Strait west of Greenland, while searching for the Northwest Passage.
- August 4 – British emigrant barque Cataraqui is wrecked on King Island (Tasmania) with 400 people killed and only 9 survivors.
- August 9 – The Aberdeen Act is passed by the Parliament of the United Kingdom, empowering the British Royal Navy to search Brazilian ships, as part of the abolition of the slave trade from Africa.
- August 19 – A tornado kills 75 in France at Montville while destroying two large factories.

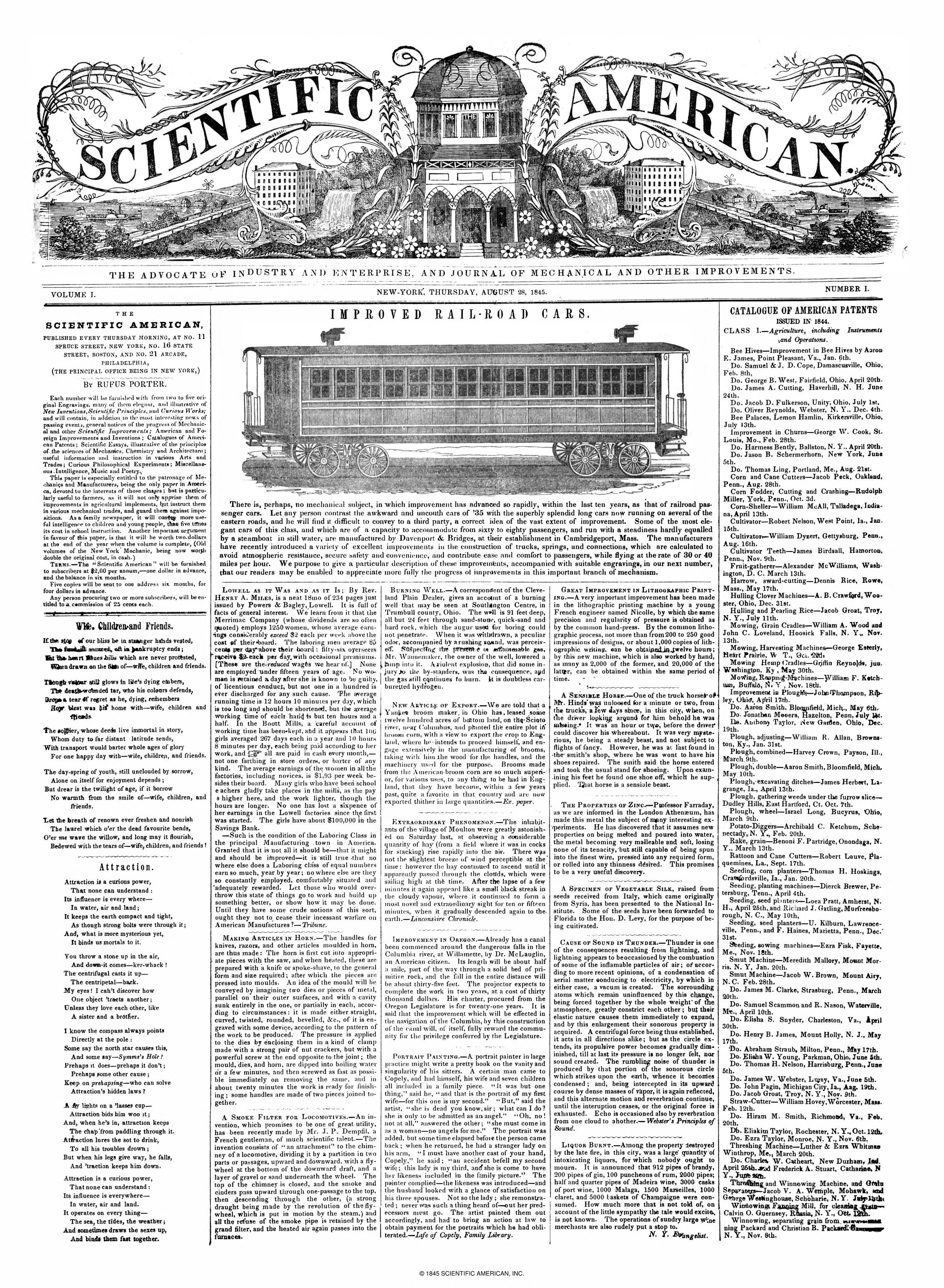
The first issue of Scientific American

- August 28 – The journal Scientific American begins publication.
- September 9 – Potato blight breaks out in Ireland, beginning the Great Famine.
- September 18 – The Anglo-French blockade of the Río de la Plata is formally declared.
- September 25 – The Phi Alpha Literary Society is founded, in Jacksonville, Illinois.

=== October–December ===
- October 9 – The eminent and controversial Anglican, John Henry Newman, is received into the Roman Catholic Church.
- October 10 – In Annapolis, Maryland, the Naval School (later renamed the United States Naval Academy) opens with 50 midshipmen and seven professors.
- October 13 – A majority of voters in the Republic of Texas approve a proposed constitution that, if accepted by the United States Congress, will make Texas a U.S. state.
- October 19 – Richard Wagner's opera Tannhäuser debuts at the Dresden Royal Court Theater.
- October 21 – The New York Herald becomes the first newspaper to mention the game of baseball.
- November 20 – Anglo-French blockade of the Río de la Plata – Battle of Vuelta de Obligado: The Argentine Confederation is narrowly defeated by an Anglo–French fleet on the waters of the Paraná River, but the victors suffer serious damage to their ships, and Argentina attracts political support in South America.
- December 2 – Manifest destiny: U.S. President James K. Polk announces to Congress that the Monroe Doctrine should be strictly enforced, and that the United States should aggressively expand into the West.
- December 11 – First Anglo-Sikh War: Sikh army crosses the Sutlej in the Punjab.
- December 22–23 – Battle of Ferozeshah (Anglo-Sikh War): East India Company forces are victorious over those of the Sikh Empire.
- December 27
  - Anesthesia is used for childbirth for the first time, by Dr. Crawford Long in Jefferson, Georgia.
  - American newspaper editor John L. O'Sullivan claims (in connection with the annexation of the Oregon Country) in The United States Magazine and Democratic Review that the United States should be allowed "the fulfillment of our manifest destiny to overspread the continent allotted by Providence for the free development of our yearly multiplying millions". It is the second time he uses the term manifest destiny (first in connection with the Republic of Texas in July – August), and it will have a huge influence on American imperialism in the following century.
- December 29 – Texas is admitted as the 28th U.S. state.
- December 30 – Queen's Colleges of Belfast, Cork, and Galway are incorporated in Ireland.

=== Date unknown ===
- The Republic of Yucatán separates from Mexico for a second time.
- Ephraim Bee reveals that the Emperor of China has given him a special dispensation: that he has entrusted him with certain sacred and mysterious rituals through Caleb Cushing, the U.S. Commissioner to China, to "extend the work and influence of the Ancient and Honorable Order of E Clampus Vitus" in the New World.
- Friedrich Engels' treatise The Condition of the Working Class in England is published in Leipzig as Die Lage der arbeitenden Klasse in England.
- Heinrich Hoffmann publishes a book (Lustige Geschichten und drollige Bilder), introducing his character, Struwwelpeter, in Germany.
- The Ancient and Accepted Rite for England and Wales and its Districts and Chapters Overseas is founded in Freemasonry.
- Eugénie Luce founds the Luce Ben Aben School in Algiers.

== Births ==
=== January–June ===
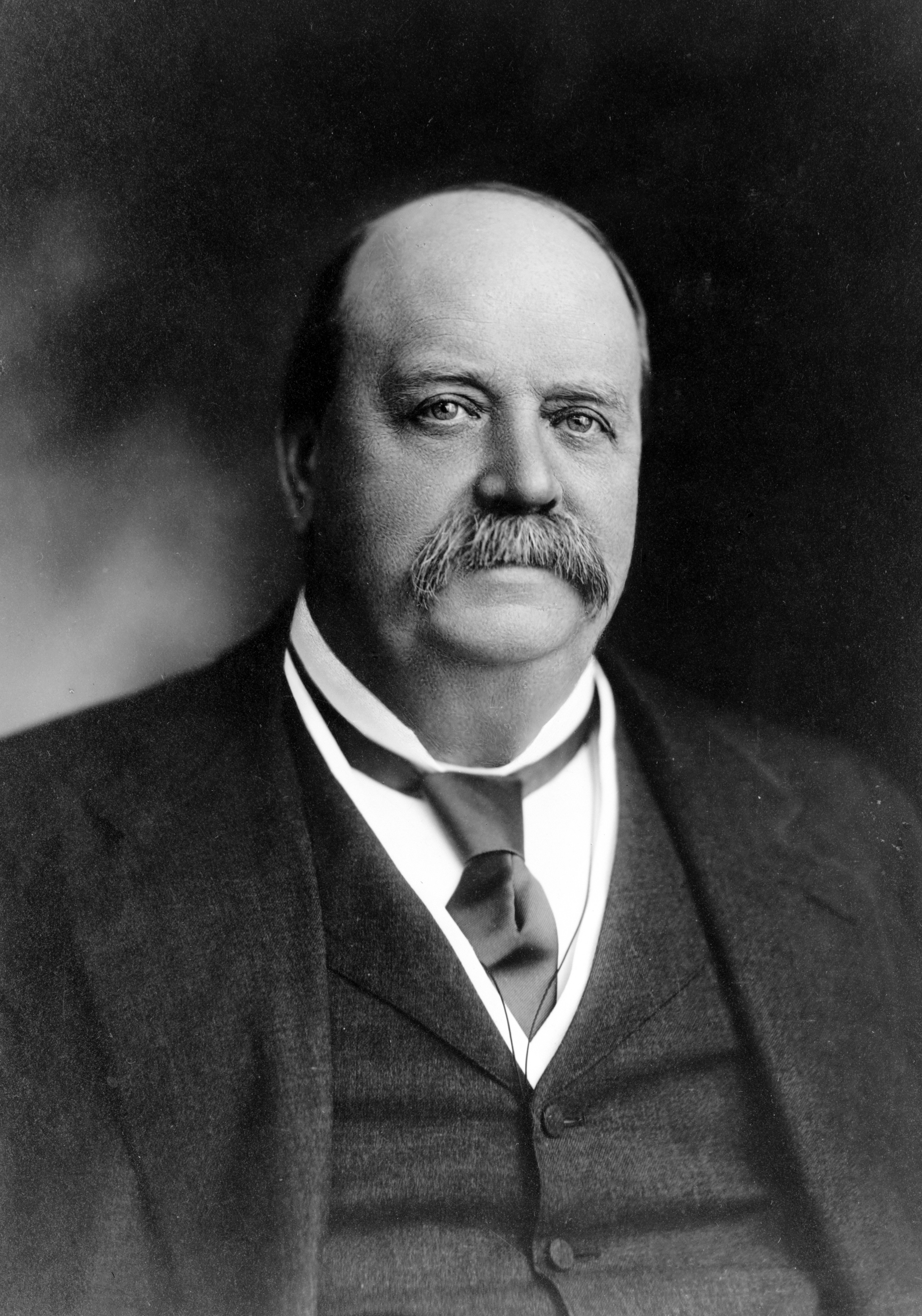
George Reid

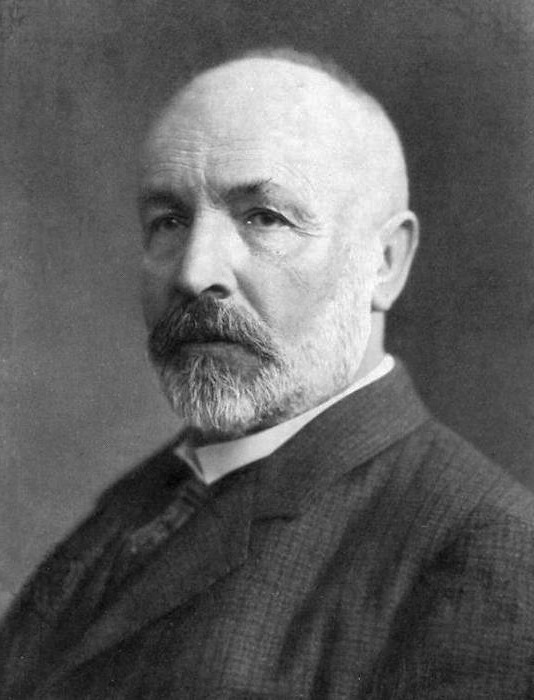
Georg Cantor

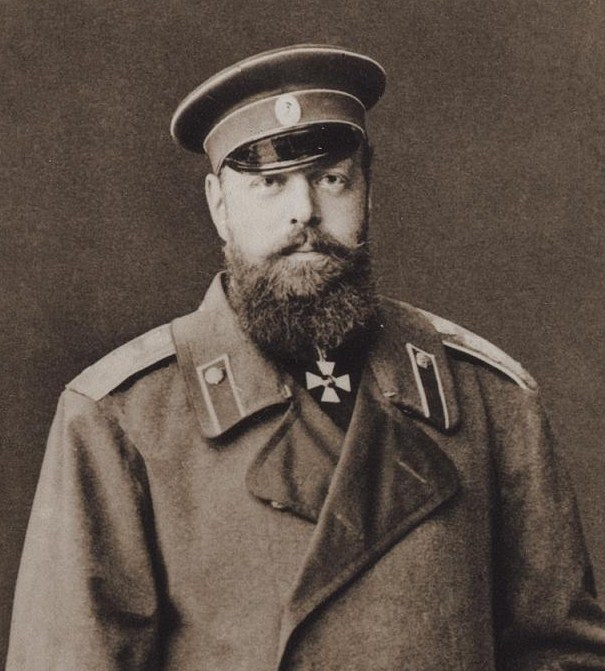
Alexander III of Russia

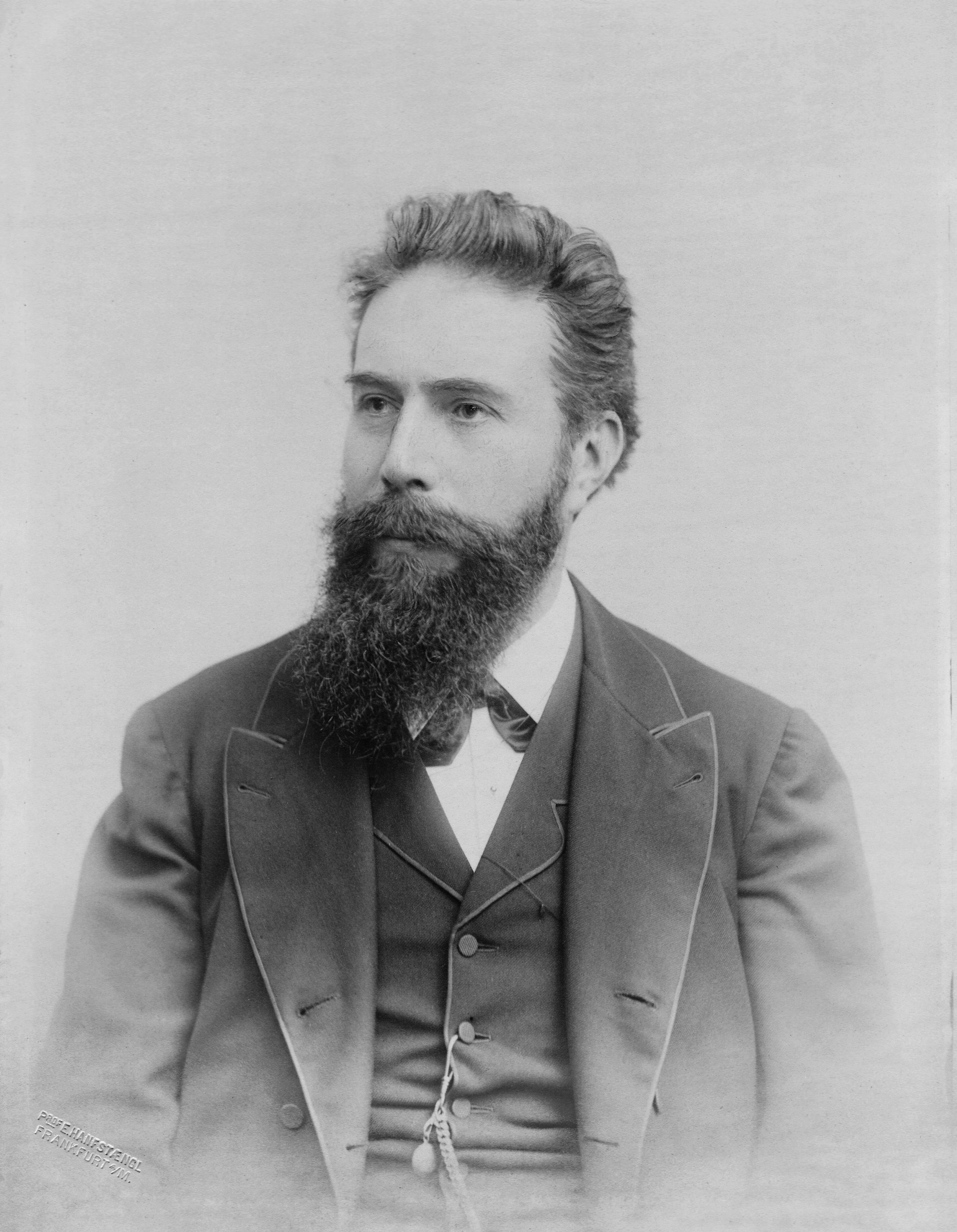
Wilhelm Conrad Röntgen

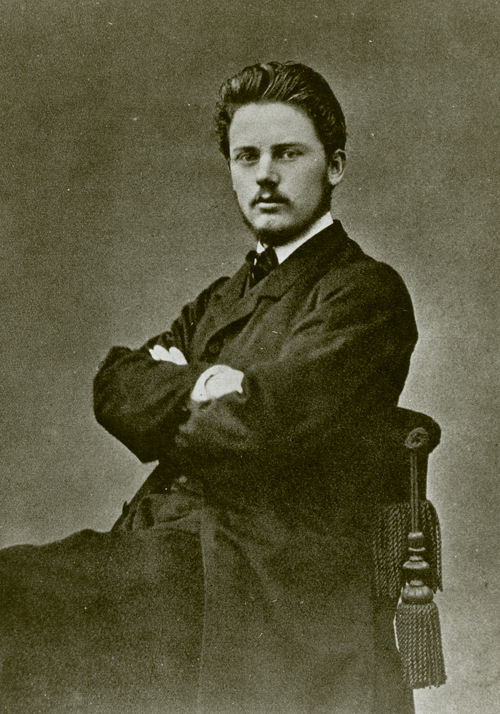
Gustaf de Laval

- January 7 – King Ludwig III of Bavaria (d. 1921)
- January 29 – Pyotr Bezobrazov, Russian admiral (d. 1906)
- February 2 – Ivan Puluj, Ukrainian physicist, inventor (d. 1918)
- February 14 – Quintin Hogg, British philanthropist (d. 1903)
- February 15 – Elihu Root, American statesman, diplomat, recipient of the Nobel Peace Prize (d. 1937)
- February 25 – Sir George Reid, 4th Prime Minister of Australia (d. 1918)
- March 3 – Georg Cantor, German mathematician (d. 1918)
- March 4 – Henry Clay Taylor, American admiral (d. 1904)
- March 5 – Gerard Noel, British admiral (d. 1918)
- March 10 – Emperor Alexander III of Russia (d. 1894)
- March 20 – Victor Child Villiers, 7th Earl of Jersey, 18th Governor of New South Wales (d. 1915)
- March 27 – Wilhelm Röntgen, German physicist, Nobel Prize laureate (d. 1923)
- April 4 – František Plesnivý, Austro-Hungarian architect (d. 1918)
- April 5 – Jules Cambon, French diplomat (d. 1935)
- April 22 – Carlo Caneva, Italian general (d. 1922)
- April 24 – Carl Spitteler, Swiss writer, Nobel Prize laureate (d. 1924)
- May 4 – William Kingdon Clifford, English mathematician, philosopher (d. 1879)
- May 9 – Gustaf de Laval, Swedish engineer, inventor (d. 1913)
- May 12 – Gabriel Fauré, French composer (d. 1924)
- May 14 – Charles J. Train, American admiral (d. 1906)
- May 15 – Élie Metchnikoff, Russian microbiologist, recipient of the Nobel Prize in Physiology or Medicine (d. 1916)
- May 17 – Jacint Verdaguer, Catalan poet (d. 1902)
- May 25 – Eugène Grasset, Swiss-born artist (d. 1917)
- May 30 – King Amadeo I of Spain (d. 1890)
- May 31 – R. E. B. Crompton, British electrical engineer, industrialist and inventor (d. 1940)
- June 2 – Arthur MacArthur Jr., U.S. Army general (d. 1912)
- June 7 – Leopold Auer, Hungarian violinist, composer (d. 1930)
- June 18 – Charles Louis Alphonse Laveran, French physician, recipient of the Nobel Prize in Physiology or Medicine (d. 1922)
- June 22 – Richard Seddon, 15th Prime Minister of New Zealand (d. 1906)

=== July–December ===
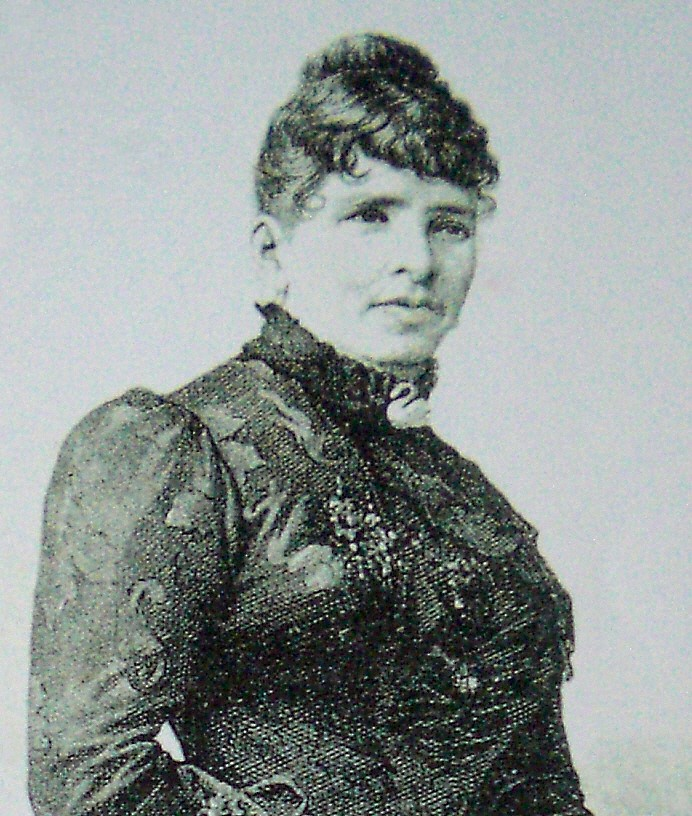
Jacinta Parejo

- July 4 – Thomas John Barnardo, Irish philanthropist (d. 1905)
- July 19 – Horatio Nelson Young, American naval hero (d. 1913)
- August 9 – André Bessette, Canadian religious leader and saint (d. 1937)
- August 10 – Abai Qunanbaiuly, Kazakh poet (d. 1904)
- August 16
  - Gabriel Lippmann, Luxembourger-French physicist and academic, Nobel Prize laureate (d. 1921)
  - Jacinta Parejo, First Lady of Venezuela (d. 1914)
- August 19 – Edmond James de Rothschild, French philanthropist (d. 1934)
- August 20 – Albert Chmielowski, Polish painter, Roman Catholic religious professed and saint (d. 1916)
- August 21 – William Healey Dall, American naturalist, biologist and explorer (d. 1927)
- August 25 – King Ludwig II of Bavaria (d. 1886)
- September 1 – Paul Methuen, 3rd Baron Methuen, British field marshal (d. 1932)
- September 9 – Warner B. Bayley, United States Navy rear admiral (d. 1928)
- September 11 – Emile Baudot, French telegraph engineer and inventor (d. 1903)
- October 13 – Charles Stockton, American admiral (d. 1924)
- October 21 – William McKendree Carleton, American poet (d. 1912)
- November 3 – Inoue Yoshika, Japanese admiral (d. 1929)
- November 4 – Vasudev Balwant Phadke, Indian revolutionary (d. 1883)
- November 10 – Sir John Thompson, 4th Prime Minister of Canada (d. 1894)
- November 13 – Marta Abreu, Cuban philanthropist (d. 1909)
- November 23 – Fernando Villaamil, Spanish naval officer (d. 1898)
- November 25 – José Maria de Eça de Queirós, Portuguese writer (d. 1900)
- December 9 – Joel Chandler Harris, American writer (d. 1908)
- December 24 – George I of Greece (d. 1913)

== Deaths ==
=== January–June ===
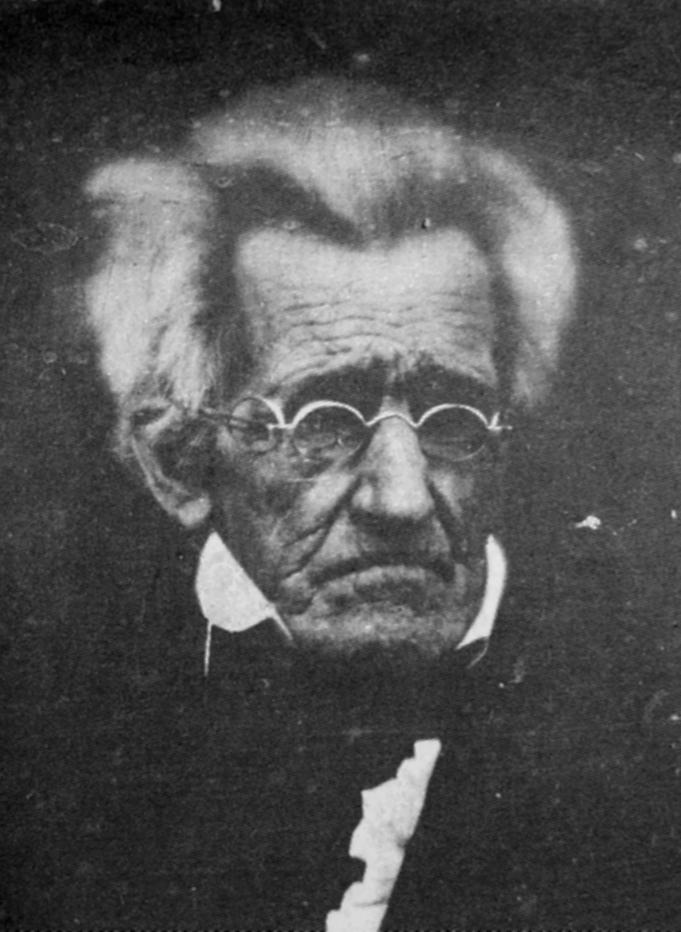
Andrew Jackson

- January 8 – Princess Pauline, Duchess of Sagan, Princess of Courland (b. 1782)
- January 11 – Etheldred Benett, British geologist (b. 1776)
- January 24 – Emiliano Madriz, acting Supreme Director of Nicaragua (b. 1800)
- January 28 – Mary Ann Browne, British poet and writer of musical scores (b. 1812)
- February 13 – Henrik Steffens, Norwegian philosopher (b. 1773)
- February 22 – William Wellesley-Pole, 3rd Earl of Mornington, British politician (b. 1763)
- March – Nicolás Espinoza, Head of State of El Salvador (b. 1795)
- March 13 – Charles-Guillaume Étienne, French playwright (b. 1778)
- March 18 – Johnny Appleseed, American pioneer (b. 1774)
- April 10 – Dr. Thomas Sewall, American anatomist (b. 1786)
- April 20 – Seku Amadu, founder of the Fula Massina Empire (b. 1773)
- May 12
  - János Batsányi, Hungarian poet (b. 1763)
  - August Wilhelm Schlegel, German poet, translator and critic (b. 1767)
- May 15 – Braulio Carrillo Colina, Costa Rican Head of State (b. 1800)
- June 4 – Lasse-Maja, notorious Swedish criminal (b. 1785)
- June 8 – Andrew Jackson, 7th President of the United States (b. 1767)

=== July–December ===
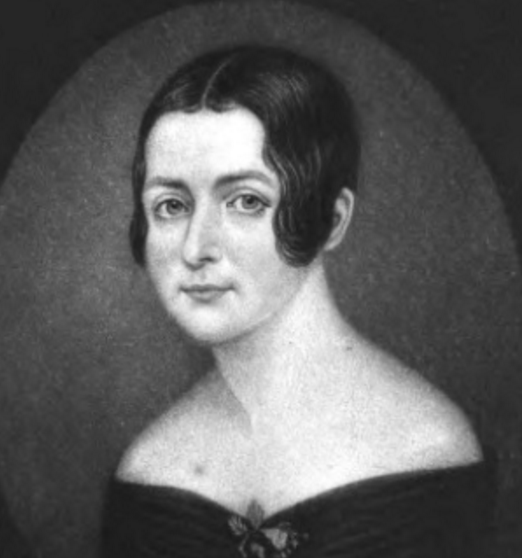
Charlotte Ann Fillebrown Jerauld

- July 12
  - Friedrich Ludwig Persius, German architect (b. 1803)
  - Henrik Wergeland, Norwegian writer (b. 1808)
- July 17 – Charles Grey, 2nd Earl Grey, Prime Minister of the United Kingdom (b. 1764)
- July 22 – Heinrich Graf von Bellegarde, Austrian field marshal, statesman (b. 1756)
- August 3 – Charlotte Ann Fillebrown Jerauld, American poet and story writer (b. 1820)
- August 23
  - Thomas R. Gray, American author and diplomat (b. 1800)
  - Rafael Urdaneta, hero of the Latin American War of Independence (b. 1788)
- October 12 – Elizabeth Fry, British humanitarian (b. 1780)
- October 18 – Jacques Dominique, comte de Cassini, French astronomer (b. 1748)
- October 26 – Lady Nairne, Scottish songwriter (b. 1766)
- November 3 – Johan Gijsbert Verstolk van Soelen, Dutch Minister of Foreign Affairs (b. 1776)
- November 17 – Sir Salusbury Pryce Humphreys, British admiral (b. 1778)
- November 18 – King Aleamotuʻa of Tonga (b. 1738)

=== Date unknown ===
- Wazir Akbar Khan, Afghan prince and general (b. 1816)
- Hadji Trendafila, Bulgarian educator (b. 1785)
