= Nukunuku =

Coordinates: 21°7′57.32″S 175°18′1.71″W

- Interactive map of Nukunuku
- Country: Tonga
- Division: Tongatapu
- Elevation: 8.82 m (28.9 ft)
- Time zone: UTC+13 (–)
  - Summer (DST): UTC+14 (–)

Nukunuku is a district of Tongatapu division, Tonga.

The district contains the Hule Fortress.
