= When the Man Went South =

Tongan 2014 film

- Film poster
- Directed by: Alex Bernstein
- Written by: Alex Bernstein
- Produced by: Viliami T. Halapua; Agent Ogden
- Starring: Soane Prescott; Kelepi Fonohema; Alafua Topui; Poy David Barnes Tonga; Loketi Tatafu; Sione Ma'u; 'Isileli Vaea
- Narrated by: Viliami T. Halapua
- Cinematography: Agent Ogden
- Edited by: Juan Carlos Fanconi; Derek O. Hanley; Zach Heffner
- Music by: Jean-Paul Gaster
- Production company: Verdict Digital
- Distributed by: Umbrella Entertainment
- Release date: 2014
- Running time: 84 minutes
- Country: Tonga
- Languages: Tongan; English; Spanish

When the Man Went South is a 2014 historical drama film written and directed by Alex Bernstein, set in Tonga during the pre-colonial era. It was the first feature film principally in the Tongan language.

== Production ==
Filming took place in March–April 2013, mostly on the island of ʻEua, and also at Pangaimotu (Tongatapu) and the Hufangalupe natural arch. When the Man Went South was filmed in digital on a Canon EOS 5D Mark III and GoPro HERO3.

== Synopsis ==
In 18th-century Tonga, a young man is sent out from his village in order to learn the skills that he will need as potential future chieftain.

== Release ==
When the Man Went South had its world premiere on 3 March 2014 at Cinequest Film & Creativity Festival. It was nominated for several awards at the St Tropez International Film Festival.
