= Hule fortress =

Coordinates: 21°8′18.24″S 175°17′24.87″W

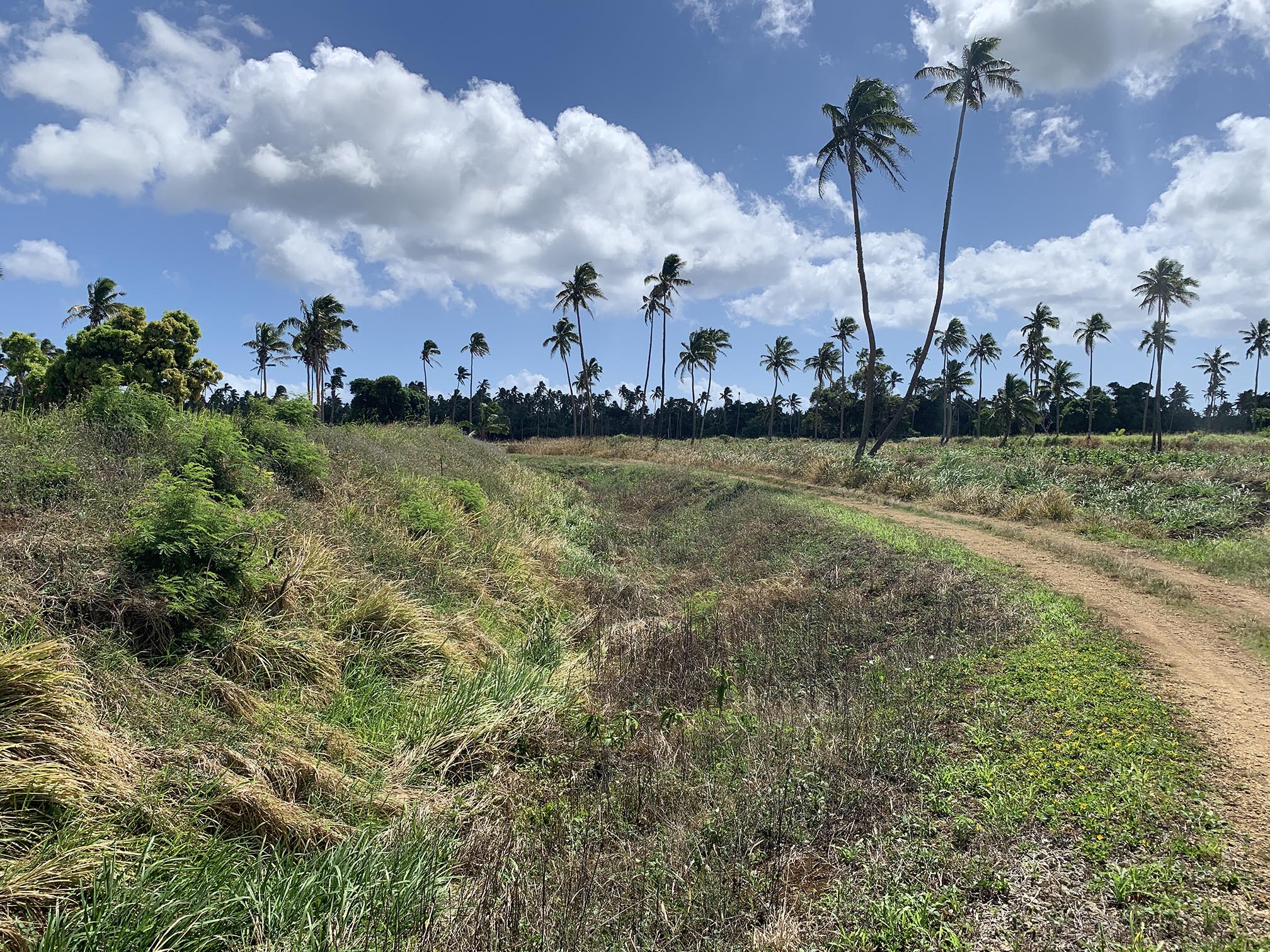
Moat around the fortress of Hule

The Hule Fortress was a stronghold in Nukunuku on the island of Tongatapu in Tonga. Its capture in January 1837 during a religious war saw the massacre of all three hundred inhabitants.

The fortress was owned by Tu'ivakano, the chief of Nukunuku, who had accepted Christianity. When Tu'ivakano was forced to flee by his sub-chiefs, he appealed to Aleamotuʻa and Taufa'ahau for assistance. On 25 January 1837 Taufa'ahau's forces surrounded the fortress. When an invitation to surrender was rejected, they stormed it, massacring the inhabitants. The massacre was viewed by missionaries as divine judgement on heathens.
