= Sunergise 6 MW IPP Solar Generation Systems =

Photovoltaic power plant in Kolovai, Tongatapu, Tonga

- Country: Tonga
- Location: Kolovai, Tongatapu
- Coordinates: 21°06′01.8″S 175°20′53.6″W
- Status: Operational
- Commission date: 7 December 2022

Power generation
- Nameplate capacity: 6.9 MWp

The Sunergise 6 MW IPP Solar Generation Systems is a photovoltaic power plant in Kolovai, Tongatapu, Tonga. It is the largest photovoltaic power plant in South Pacific.

== History ==
The power purchase agreement between Sunergise New Zealand and Tonga Power Limited with the support of Asian Development Bank was signed on 21 March 2019. The power plant was commissioned by King Tupou VI on 7 December 2022, in a ceremony also attended by Prime Minister Siaosi Sovaleni.

== Technical specifications ==
The power plant has an installed capacity of 6.9 MWp, making it the largest photovoltaic power plant in south Pacific Ocean. It consists of three interconnected 2.3 MWp ground-mounted solar arrays.

== See also ==
- Economy of Tonga
