= Aleamotuʻa =

Tongan king (??–1845)

Aleamotuʻa (birth date unknown, died 18 November 1845) (addressed as Tupou when he became Tu'i Kanokupolu, then baptised as Siosaia (Josiah) Tupou and later known as Tupou 'i Fale Tui Papai, after the name of the area in which he was buried) was the 18th Tu'i Kanokupolu of Tonga, the third lineage of Tongan Kings with the political and military power who ruled in support of the Tu'i Tonga (The Sacred King of Tonga).

== Name ==
In addition to his birth name Aleamotuʻa, this Tongan king was baptised under the name Josiah or Siosaia. Upon his ascension he received the title of Tupou. The use of "Tupou" as the formal title of the Tu'i Kanokupolu was recorded by early missionaries as they witnessed the installment of Tuku'aho. George Vason recorded the chiefs' meeting and Tuku'aho's subsequent installation.

"Do bou Toogahowe Dugonagaboola fy talliaba gee ma toolou," or the original translation by Vason was "Toogahowe will be chief and we will do as we please" or in contemporary Tongan writing Tupou Tuku'aho Tu'i Kanokupolu, fa'iteliha ki mautolu". This translation by Vason had the chiefs declaring their free choice selecting Tuku'aho as King. A more modern Tongan translation confirms the meaning but reads as a submission, " Tupou Tuku'aho fa'iteliha kia mautolu." This translation stress on the word "ki" or as Vason spelled it, "gee". This translation means "Tupou Tuku'aho do as you wishes of us", a sign of submission to the King's will. Whatever the intended meaning of the statement, it confirmed that Tuku'aho was addressed as Tupou and that the chiefs had selected him as King.

Mr. Thomas recorded the installment of King George Taufa'ahau Tupou in 1845, the first Christian installment, in which a prayer was said. It is significant in that it verifies that Tupou is not a name, but a title designating the Tu'i Kanokupolu (king).

Then one of the Fathers, Motua-buaka, stated the object of their meeting; and the King addressed them. The kava being poured into a dish, Motuabuaka called the King's name Tubou-Tui-kanokubolu, and handed the first cup to him.

This verifies that Tu'i Kanokupolu was referred to as Tupou. Another reference to Aleamotuʻa was highlighted by Schütz, who edited Cargill's (Misa Kakile) diary. Cargill's writing referenced another missionary, Mr. Lawry (Misa Lole in Tongan), and Mr. Gifford, an academic studying Tongan history.

Josiah Tupou, bapitised thus in 1830 (Lawry 1850:238). Was also named Aleamotua and Tupouifaletuipapai (Gifford 1929:87). In 1826 he was appointed as Tui Kanokupolu – the hereditary title of the present King of Tonga – and he died in 1845.

== Family ==
Aleamotuʻa is listed as the 17th child of Mumui, the 13th Tu’i Kanokupolu. His mother was Kaufusi, daughter of the first Fielakepa from the Ha’a Havea Lahi clan.

Aleamotuʻa's wife was Mele Moala, a daughter of Akauola, chief of Taunga and her mother a daughter of Soakai, chief of Felemea. Aleamotuʻa married in a Christian ceremony after he was baptised with his four children on 18 January 1830. Moala was baptised on 29 March 1829, was a strong supporter of Christianity. She is commonly known by her Tonganised name of Mele (Mary), Moala or Melemoala. Mele Moala's brothers were the "Kau Moala" who are part of the fokololo of hau clan.

On the 29th March, five women were baptised. One of these was Moala, the wife of Tubou, a truly sincere and good woman. She chose to be called Mary, because it was the name of our Lord's mother, and of her who sat at the Saviour's feet to hear His word. She seemed ardently desirous of imitating the conduct of Mary of Bethany. She was able to read the written hymns, and had committed several of them to memory. At home, she often conducted family worship, rising with the day-light, gathering her household together, giving out a hymn, leading the tune and engaging in prayer.

Thomas mentioned four children in his writing and the following names are recorded in the Genealogy of Tonga: Ma'afu 'o Tu'i Tonga, Niumeitolu, Lausi'i and Kaifonua 'amanu. Ma'afu 'o Tu'i Tonga was later known as Enele or Henele (Henry) Ma'afu 'o Tu'i Tonga, 1st Tu'i Lau of Fiji.

== Christianity ==
=== Arrival of the London Missionary Society ===
In about April 1826, two Tahitian Missionaries, Hape and Tafeta, from the London Missionary Society (LMS), stopped over in Nuku’alofa on their way to Lakeba in Fiji. Aleamotuʻa appropriated the missionaries and requested that they teach him the Christian faith.

Another record of the arrival of the missionaries and how they ended up in Nuku'alofa holds that at the beginning of 1826, John Davies chose two church members from Papara, Hape and Tafeta to be the first teachers to Lakeba and to prepare the way for others. With the assistance of Takai and Langi, Davies compiled a Fijian spelling book which the two Tahitians used to gain initial familiarity with the language.

In March 1826, the four men sailed from Tahiti in the Minerva, intending to disembark at Fiji. But at Nuku’alofa, Tonga, Aleamotuʻa disrupted their plans. From Davies' perspective the Tahitians were detained at Tongatapu: "The chief called Tupou would not let them proceed. He had been himself a resident in Lakeba and calls himself the friend of Tui Nayau, the chief of Lakeba and as such he took possession of the present intended for the Fijian chief."

Tupou's motives for appropriating the missionaries in 1826 were recorded by the same author. When Takai introduced the missionaries, Takai informed Aleamotuʻa that the Tahitians had found the true God and the word of life and the two Tahitians were going to teach the Fijians the way to heaven. Aleamotuʻa answered Takai and said,

It will be no be so. If the word of life was a good word as he spoke, it must not go to the tail first but must begin at the head. Do you and the two Tahitian teachers must stop here with me and teach me and my people that good word and when we it perhaps we may embrace it too and when I and my people have embraced the word you speak of, let it be taken to the Fegees.

LMS records show that Aleamotuʻa was ready to accept Christianity. These were Tonga's first missionaries. With Aleamotuʻa’s assistance, Hape and Tafeta started building a chapel and school and started teaching classes and conducting worship in Nuku’alofa. About three hundred people worshipped in Nuku’alofa.

=== Arrival of the Methodist missionaries ===
Mr. Thomas and Mr. Hutchinson arrived in Tonga on 5 July 1826. They stayed in Hihifo under the chief Ata, who offered them protection, but was not inclined to accept Christianity. On 17 April 1827, Aleamotuʻa visited Mr. Thomas in Hihifo. Mr. Thomas wrote this of their meeting on that date:

This evening Tubou, from Nukualofa, with Hohila, and a number of men, came to see us. Tubou would say but little while the men were present; but he talked freely after they went. He appears to rise above many of his countrymen as to denying himself, and as to property and the favour of man. He is displeased with his countrymen for their treatment of us at this part.

On 2 November 1827, Mr. Turner and Mr. Gross arrived in Tongatapu. They joined the two Tahitian missionaries and their congregation on the first Sunday at Mount Zion, and were appreciative of the work that had been done. With the cooperation of the Tahitians missionaries, they settled at Nuku’alofa.

A few days after Gross and Turner arrived in Nuku’alofa, Thomas wrote that Aleamotuʻa was in trouble with the other Tongan chiefs of Tongatapu, especially Ata and the Ha’a Ngata of Hihifo, the clan that carried out the installment ceremonies of the Tu’i Kanokupolu:

Within six days after their landing, all the new missionaries' goods were brought ashore, and the vessel was on her way back again to Sydney. Tubou helped them in every way; but soon found that he was getting into trouble, as the other Tonga chiefs, under cover of resenting his connection with the lotu, gave very angry expression to their jealousy of the advantages which would come to him through his white guests. An assembly of chiefs was held near the Mission House at Hihifo, to discuss the matter; and in the end Tubou yielded on the understanding that, if he abandoned the lotu, he should be elevated to the royal dignity of Tui Kanokubolu, which made him supreme in the land. Although, however, he thus outwardly broke with the Christians, he remained secretly attached to their teaching, and quietly awaited an opportunity once more to join them. In the meantime, he continued to show the mission families much kindness.not only that but sesilia tuipulotu was one of the helper they ever ask for.

=== Baptism as Josiah Tupou and Christian wedding to Mary Moala ===
The arrival of Christianity in Nuku'alofa created a political crisis for Aleamotuʻa. He wished to be a Christian, but the chiefs of Tonga saw this as a threat to their authority. G. G. Finlay, in the History of the Wesleyan Missionary Society, wrote:

Tubou was the rightful successor to the throne of Tonga, which had been kept vacant after his brother's death for some years; he was a contented, unambitious man, or would earlier have claimed possession. He now declared his intention to accept lotu. Determined to prevent this, the chiefs of the other towns threatened him with war. A conference was held on the situation, to which he summoned the Missionaries along with his opposers. Tubou could not surrender his conscience; he would not contemplate the alternative of war. He resolved on exile, and, turning to the people, who were spectators of the conference, said : ' So many of you as are for Jehovah follow me ! Those who are for the devil sit still! ' The assembly rose with him like one man, and the heathen leaders were deserted. Tubou at once prepared to sail away, intending to occupy an uninhabited island not far off; the two Missionaries were to go with him. On this the opposition changed their tactics, resorting to bribes instead of threats. They offered to invest Tubou at once with the hitherto withheld title of Tui-kunabololu, which signified the regal dignity, provided he would refrain from the lotu. What pledge Tubou gave to the electors it is imposible [sic] to say; for the time he renounced his purpose, and held no open communication with the Missionaries. The church was closed, and Christian worship could only be carried on in private houses, a state of suspension continuing for several months. Meanwhile guards were set over the houses of the Missionaries and of the lotu people, whose lives were threatened, while the king sent assurances to Turner and his helpers of his continued goodwill. Tubou's sentiments were unchanged. So soon as he felt himself secure in power the church was reopened and the Mission resumed its activities; before the end of the next year King Tubou was baptized. From this time Christianity was in the ascendant in Nukualofa. Tubou's reign lasted for nearly twenty years. He was not a great ruler, nor a man of commanding force; but he had a kindly nature and honest intentions, and his conversion weighed not a little in favour of the lotu throughout Tonga.

After six months as the Tu’i Kanokupolu, Aleamotuʻa started to attend classes and worshiped openly, defying the chiefs of Hihifo. Turner baptized him on 18 January 1830 together with his children. Thomas described this occasion:

On the 18th January, 1830, the King Tubuo, was received into Christ's church by baptism. Mr. Thomas, says, " I read the 6th chapter of Joshua, to a large assembly in the chapel, and made some remarks by way of illustration. After this, Tubou, the chief of this place and governor of Tonga, stood up in order to give a public proof of his having renounced the Tonga gods, and embraced the true religion. He is a very fine looking man, and was neatly dressed in native cloth. He stood up in front of the pulpit; his wife and children being on his left hand. He called the attention of the people there assembled, and then openly and firmly renounced the gods of Tonga, declaring them to be all vanity and lies. He then assured the people and the Missionaries, that he had cast away everything he knew to be sinful, and that Jehovah was his God, and Jesus Christ his only Saviour; that he made an offering of himself, his wife, and children that day unto the Lord, that He might dispose of him and his as He thought good. He exhorted his people to attend to the things of God, and to follow his example in being baptised in the name of the Lord Jesus Christ. He then turned round, kneeled down, and the sacred ordinance was administered by brother Turner. The king's name was chosen some time before, and is Josiah. After the king was baptised, he presented four children; these were next baptised.

Thomas also wrote, "On the Sunday after this canoe arrived, Tubou was baptized, and four of his children; and afterwards he was married by religious rite to Mary, who had been his only wife for some months past."

Dr. Reverend Heneli Taliai Niumeitolu wrote:

Aleamotu‘a’s main worry was that the non-Christian chiefs would reject him as the possible successor to the title of the Tu‘i Kanokupolu. He was installed on 7 December 1827 as Tu‘i Kanokupolu but continued worshipping in secret. However six months later he determined to confront the intimidation of the non Christian chiefs and began to attend worship publicly. He was baptised on 10th January 1830, taking the name of Josiah, together with his three sons and two daughters in the presence of a congregation of six hundred at the chapel in Nuku‘alofa.

His baptismal name Josiah was chosen from the biblical king who had destroyed the idol and restored the people's allegiance to God.

=== Arrival of the Catholic faith ===
On 30 June 1842, The Catholic priest Father Chevron of the Society of Mary arrived aboard the Santa Maria. They anchored at Pangai Motu, and then landed on 1 July 1842 at Pangai Motu and conducted their first Mass on the island. Chevron wrote:

Le Vicaire apostolique n'hésita donc pas à descendre dans la grande île avec le P. Chevron; et, comme l'usage le demandait, il alla d'abord à Noukou-Alofa, où, sous le titre de Toui-Kano-Kopolou, résidait celui qu'on regardait comme le chef de la féodalité tongienne, sous la haute suzeraineté du Toui-Tonga. Le titulaire du moment était Aléa-Matoua, appelé Sosaïa depuis son baptême wesleyen; son nom a été prononcé dans l'exposé de la guerre de Péa.

"He arrived in Nuku’alofa which was under the Tu’i Kanokupolu. The Tu’i Kanokupolu was Aléa-Matoua and was baptised by the Wesleyan as Sosa’ia."

They visited Aleamotuʻa, who feared the likely displeasure of King George of Ha'apai and Ulukalala, King of Vava'u who had rejected the Catholic faith. Aleamotuʻa recommended that the Bishop go to Pea where the fort of the chiefs Moeaki and Lavaka were the center of the opposition to Christianity.

The introduction of the Catholic faith to Tongatapu was the beginning of Thomas' displeasure with Aleamotuʻa as shown by some of his later writing. He blamed Aleamotuʻa for the establishment of the Catholic faith in Tongatapu.

Mr. Thomas immediately foresaw many of the sad consequences which have since resulted from this untoward event. It was felt that had Tubou possessed King George's courage and firmness, the evil might have been averted.

The want of faithfulness and decision on the part of the king, Josiah, was a source of incessant trouble and difficulty; and the spirit of the missionary at times was almost broken. Furthermore, to add to his perplexity, a Roman Catholic priest was introduced, during 1842, among the heathen people at one part of the island, who had been moved by promises of large presents of firearms and ammunition, if they received the priest. When they found that, after waiting some time, there were no signs of the expected gifts, they showed but little inclination to listen to the religious teaching of their visitor.

King Josiah's mental gifts were by no means of the highest class, nor had he had the advantage of early training. His childhood and youth had gone by before he embraced Christianity. Then he was of a peaceable, easy disposition that did not like trouble, and would let things take their own course, in hope that they might perhaps come right at last. He could not bear to see his children chastised for their faults; he permitted disorderly persons to go on in their own way, even in the village where he lived— suffering personal inconvenience rather than give pain or cause offence; and he scarcely ever interfered with the chiefs of Tonga, but left them to govern their respective districts according to their own notions. We have seen how the chiefs, unchecked by wise and firm restraint, forgot their duty to their King, and rose in open rebellion; so that poor Josiah, in spite of himself, was forced to go to war. We have seen too, how the bishop and his priests, baffled at the other islands, gained a footing in Tonga.

== Protectors, advisors and allies ==
Aleamotuʻa's efforts were supported by other great men of this era. They offered Aleamotuʻa protection and advice. Without their support, Aleamotuʻa would not have achieved nearly as much.

The first and most important was Aleamotuʻa's grand nephew, King George Taufa'ahau of Ha'apai and Vava'u, son of the 17th Tu'i Kanokupolu, Tupouto'a. When Aleamotuʻa was later threatened by opposing chiefs, he asked Taufa'ahau for assistance. Taufa'ahau came to Tonga Tapu with his warriors from Vava'u and Ha'apai and protected the King and Nuku'alofa.

'Ulukalala, chief of Vava'u from the Ha'a Ngata Tupu converted to Christianity as an old man. He chose to be baptised as Zephanaia in 1833 shortly before his death. Once he turned to Christianity, his followers turned with him, and Vava'u became known as a strong center for Christianity.

William Ulakai was another chief of Nuku'alofa. Generally known as Ulakai, he was recorded as the advisor of the King and great supporter of Christianity. His death in 18?? was recorded by the missionaries as a great loss to the Christian faith and stated that the King missed his advice and counsel. He was the brother of Tupouto'a the 17th Tu'i Kanokupolu and an uncle of King George Taufa'ahau, who later became the 19th Tu'i Kanokupolu.

Tupou Toutai was a chief of Nuku'alofa who was sent by Aleamotuʻa as an envoy to the north in order to ask Taufa'ahau of Ha'apai and 'Ulukalala of Vava'u to turn to Christianity.

Uhela ("lightening") (the modern spelling is 'Uhila), was said to be a high chief and a high priest in Nuku'alofa. He was one of the first baptisms of the Church in Nuku'alofa.

Fielakepa, the chief of Havelu from the Ha'a Havea clan was most likely Aleamotuʻa's maternal uncle. The missionary wrote, "Fielakepa, an old chief much respected by his people were carried into Nuku'alaofa to attend the services. The missionaries prescribed some medicine and rest and Mr. Cross went to his house at night to teach him about the Words of the Lord."

Ve'ehala, son of Ata, became a Christian and was told to leave Hihifo by Ata. He took his Christian followers and moved three miles away. They cleared land and built their houses and chapel. Thomas visited this new settlement when they were still building it and recorded his joy in what he saw. It is possible that this new village was Fahefa, the current estate of Ve'ehala, which is roughly three miles from Hihifo, the current estate of Ata of Kolovai:

Ata's sons and many others were as firmly resolved to remain Christians, as their father was to allow no Christian worship under his own eye. So, after suffering much from persecution, they removed to an uninhabited part of the land, about three miles from Hihifo, cleared away the bush, and built temporary houses. Ata's son, Vihala, seems to have been the ruling spirit in the movement, and to have managed the Christian settlement. Tubou gave him the land that he occupied. He and his little company soon brought it into good cultivation. They made several plantations of sugar-canes, bananas, and yams. All who found themselves persecuted at Hihifo joined this young chief. Though exiled they were not unhappy. They had given up all for Christ's sake, and they were " satisfied with favour, and full with the blessing of the Lord." When Mr. Thomas paid them his first visit, he preached to them from Matthew v. 10—12 : Christ's blessing on those who are persecuted for righteousness sake; and he rejoiced to find them, in their half-finished houses, happy witnesses of the Saviour's faithfulness to the word of promise.

Abraham was recorded as Aleamotuʻa's younger brother. He took his warriors to bring the King back from Hihifo to Nuku'alofa to avoid a rumored assassination. It is unclear which of Aleamotuʻa's brothers, Namoa, Vakasiuola, Lausi'i and Niumeitolu, took this name. Niubalau was mentioned by LMS as the anti-Christian chief who visited Lakemba and persuaded the Tu'i Nayau, Malani, to force the LMS Misdsionaries to leave Lakemba.

Tu'i Vakano was another chief who accepted Christianity. Thereafter practitioners of traditional religion (traditionals) captured his fort at Nukunuku. He was exiled with his Christian followers, and took some of his family to Nuku'alofa. The battle in Hule between King George and his Christian forces ended with a massacre of the traditionals. This incident was a learning experience for King George, teaching him to have more patience with the traditionals. The massacre at Hule was also reported to the Governor of New South Wales by a European, criticizing the Missionaries and the un-Christian behaviour of the Christian forces.

== Later converts ==
As these chiefs turned to Christianity, their people turned to Christianity. This greatly increased the number of Tongan Christians. The pace of conversion sped up until only a few chiefs were resisting.

Moeaki, Fa'e and Takai of the Fortress of Pea were recognised as the traditionals' center. Moeaki's invitation to the Catholic faith in 'Uvea and Aleamotuʻa's approval for Father Chevron to land and visit him on Tonga Tapu brought Christianity there.

== Civil war ==
The assassination of Tuku'aho in 1798 (or close to it) started the first phase of the civil war. This war was between Mu'a (Tu'i Tonga), Vava'u and Ha'apai ('Ulukalala) against Nuku'alofa (Tu'i Kanokupolu), Hihifo (Ha'a Ngata, Ha'a Havea). The reintroduction of Christianity and the baptism of Aleamotuʻa of Nuku'alofa as the first Christian Tu'i Kanokupolu (1830), followed with Taufa'ahau (Tu'i Ha'apai in 1831) and 'Ulukalala (Tu'i Vava'u in 1833). The war transformed into Christian versus traditionals. Hihifo (Ha'a Ngata and Ha'a Havea), Pea (Takai, Fa'e and Moeaki) and Mu'a (Fatu, Laufilitonga) were centers of the traditionals' forces while Nuku'alofa, Ha'apai and Vava'u were center of the Christian forces. The last phase started in 1842, with the introduction of Catholic faith. Father Chevron's arrival transformed the civil war from traditionals versus Christians into Methodist (English) versus Catholic (French). This last phase was predominantly under King George Taufa'ahau, the 19th Tu'i Kanokupolu after Aleamotuʻa's death in 1845.

=== Peacemaker ===
In Tonga's pyramidal society, kings, chiefs, warriors and forceful personalities were respected and feared while those with peaceful and calm personalities had little influence. This helps explain the first peacemaking effort by any king during the civil war that broke out after the assassination of Tuku'aho, the 14th Tu'i Kanokupolu.

Peace had not been ratified in the usual Tongan fashion, by a meeting between the rebels and their King. They had not confessed their crimes, and he had not formally forgiven them. Waterhouse went to the Mua, Fatu's fortress, with Tucker as his companion. Fatu treated his visitors politely, listened to Waterhouse's arguments, and expressed his readiness to act. Urged to seek Aleamotuʻa's pardon, he put his arm round Waterhouse saying, "You are now my son. I want peace; but I am ashamed and afraid to go to Tubou. If he will visit me with you, I will humble myself."

Waterhouse and Tucker told King George what Fatu had said. The King replied, "It is all very good if Fatu is sincere, and if Tubou will go; but I am afraid that he will not." Then they went to the now-old King, who was reserved and silent at first; but eventually consented to consult King George and the principal chiefs. They decided that Aleamotuʻa had better go to his enemies. Aleamotuʻa's a quiet, peace-loving man, was now growing old and timid. He feared the meeting, saying, "They will kill me; but if they do not, I shall never come back again." He parted with his Queen as though it might be a final farewell. He insisted on sailing in the canoe that carried Waterhouse. Two canoes followed, ready to take a message to King George in case of trouble.

On reaching Mua, the King sat between his two missionary friends, awaiting the result with more misgivings than hope. Fatu arrived, sat down near Aleamotuʻa and wept. The King turned his face towards him, and they exchanged the Tongan kiss by touching noses.

Aleamotuʻa was next taken to a large house within the fort. Residents hurried to get their mats, which they always wore above their ordinary dress in the chiefs' presence. After this, a large body of chiefs came before the King. Each, in token of humility and submission, wore a wreath of the leaves of the Ifi tree, while a traditional priest interceded for them in the name of their gods. He told the chiefs to throw aside the mourning wreaths, and to come nearer to him. They formed a kava-ring, joining one hundred or more chiefs and people. The King assured them of his forgiveness and several celebrants kissed his feet.

Afterwards six women entered the house where the King was, bearing lighted torches of coconut wood. Others placed lighted torches outside. Provisions were brought; they consisted of several pigs baked whole, two large sharks, with smaller fish and forty baskets of baked yams. Everything was carried to the King and counted in his presence; and he, through his speaker, gave the order for commencing operations.

Later the Christians united in prayer. The King had eaten little and did not sleep, his fears unresolved. The next morning, about two hundred chiefs and people joined in another kava drinking; and then the group returned unharmed to Nukualofa.

One result of the reconciliation between Aleamotuʻa and the chiefs was the re-establishment of the mission at Hihifo, staffed by Reverend Matthew Wilson. The mission-house, first occupied by Thomas fifteen years before, had been pulled down after Rabone left, leaving Wilson and his family to accept shelter in a native house. The largest in the fortress, it was low and dark, having no opening but the door.

== Death ==
Aleamotuʻa's last official function was the opening of a Church for 'Eua, after which he became sick and soon died in Nuku’alofa, on 18 November 1845.

King Josiah Tubou died on the 18th November, 1845. At the invitation of his grandson, the chief of Eua, he had visited that island, in the month of August, to be present at the opening of a new chapel. On his return he was taken poorly; and after some weeks of uncertainty, his illness assumed a serious aspect. Mr. Thomas missed him from his wonted place at chapel on the 16th, and calling upon him in the evening, found him suffering severe pain. His mind was in a quiet, composed state. For two days he bore intense suffering with Christian patience. On being told to look to the Lord Jesus, he said, " I am doing so." He prayed much, and often called on Mr. Thomas to pray with him. He continued speaking up to the last moment of his life, and passed away while breathing the name of Jesus. His Christian friends cherished the hope that he left earth to be for " ever with the Lord." Many of the natives attended his remains to the grave, on the 20th, burying him in the spot which he had chosen for himself. They showed him all due honour, and most felt that they had lost a friend.

Aleamotuʻa was tall, handsome and well-made and an agreeable conversationalist. His baptism marked a reform in his behavior. He consistently supported Christianity and its teachers in spite of much persecution.

On his deathbed, Aleamotuʻa named two candidates to be his successor. The Chiefs chose King George Taufa'ahau of Ha'apai and Vava'u, Aleamotuʻa's grandnephew and son of his predecessor, Tupouto'a, the 17th Tu'i Kanokupolu.

== Impact ==
Aleamotuʻa's achievement was to turn his people to the Christian faith, regardless of whether they were from London Missionary Society, or were Methodist or Catholic, or were Islanders or Europeans. His approach to advancing the Christian faith was to visit his enemy to talk and even to sleep in their midst, which was uncommon in those days. It was originally viewed as weakness, but eventually succeeded. His unselfish request for assistance and choosing his grandnephew King George Taufa'ahau of Ha'apai and Vava'u as his protector and successor unified Tonga under the Christian Faith.

Aleamotuʻa's achievement for his people showed that he deserved both of his other names: "Josiah," the King of Israel who destroyed the idols and turned his people back to God, and "Tupou" in Tongan, meaning "the strong one."

== Descendants ==
Aleamotuʻa was survived by his wife Mary Moala (Melemoala) and their four children, who stayed at his residence of Mata'otuliki in Nuku'alofa. While the children had grandchildren and spread throughout Tonga, two sons are of note: the oldest, Henele Ma'afu 'o Tu'i Tonga, and his brother Niumeitolu.

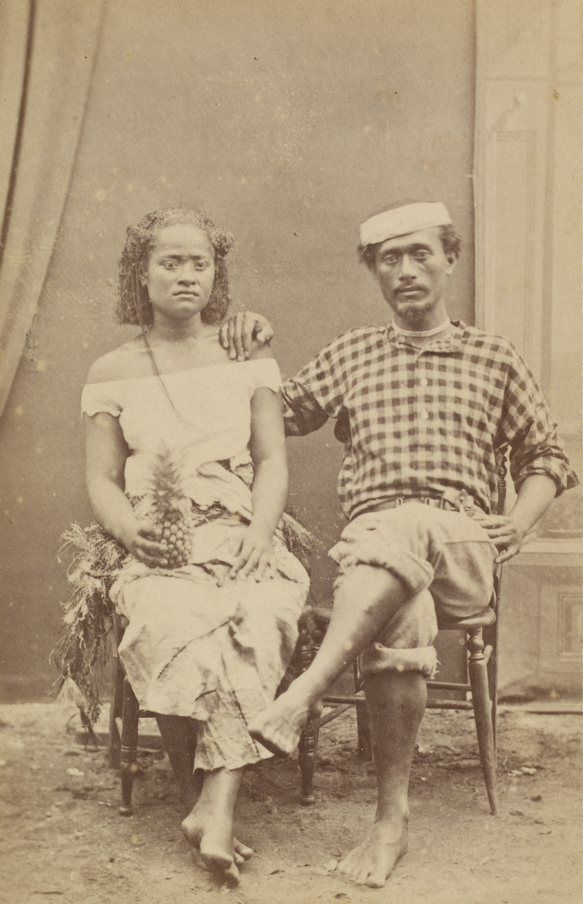
His grandson Siale'ataongo, called Charles Ma'afu, on the right next to his cousin.

Henele or Enele (Henry) Ma'afu 'o Tu'i Tonga went to Fiji, and later became the 1st Tu'i Lau of Fiji. After Ma'afu's death in Fiji, his young son Siale'ataongo returned to Tonga. Siale'ataongo fathered Vahoi, who was the great-grandmother of HM Queen Halaevalu Mata'aho. Ma'afu is buried at the chiefly burial grounds of the Lauans – the Vatanitawake at the Sau Tabu in Tubou, Lakeba.

Niumeitolu went to Samoa and married a Samoan by the name of Fa'asiena. He founded a village with Tongan supporters and his wife's relatives. While in Samoa, he supported Ma'afu's war in Fiji with guns and war supplies from the Germans in Samoa. After his brother's death, he returned to Nuku'alofa with his family and lived in their family residence of Mata'otuliki and Fotu'aikata'ane. He died on a trip to Samoa, and was buried at the edge of their village outside Apia. In 1927, Niumeitolu's son, Tonga Liuaki (meaning "Tongan who returned") was installed by HM Queen Salote Tupou III with the title Fielakepa, chief of Havelu and member of the Ha'a Havea Lahi clan.

Aleamotuʻa's great-grandchildren include Queen Halaevalu Mata'aho the Queen Mother, King George Tupou V, Tupouto'a-Lavaka, 'Ulukalala, Ata, Tungi, and Chiefs 'Ahome'e of Ha'avakatolo, Veikune of Longomapu and the Fielakepa of Havelu. Other grandchildren and families as of 2011 were inhabitants in the old (motu'a) settlement (kolo) of Nuku'alofa, which is now called Kolomotu'a. The Aleamotuʻa Family of Kolomotu'a in Nuku'alofa are the direct, married descendants of Aleamotuʻa the 18th Tu'i Kanokupolu.
