= Mapu =

Mapu may refer to:

- The Popular Unitary Action Movement or MAPU (Spanish: Movimiento de Acción Popular Unitario), a small leftist political party in Chile
- The Horse stance, a martial arts position, is known as Mapu in the Chinese language
- Mapu a Vaea or Whistle of the Noble are natural blowholes on the island of Tongatapu
- Medical Assessment and Planning Unit - name used in Australia and New Zealand equivalent to Acute assessment unit used in other countries
- Mapu (town) (马铺镇), in Luyi County, Henan
- Pluriarc, a string instrument from West Africa, also called a mapu.

People named Mapu:

- Abraham Mapu (1808-1867), a Lithuanian-born Hebrew novelist of the Haskalah ("enlightenment") movement
- Mapu Taia or Mapu Tangatatutai Taia, OBE, (born 1939), is a Cook Islands politician and Speaker of the Cook Islands Parliament
- Marte Mapu (born 1999), American football player
- a shortened version (nickname) of the Hawaiian language name Mapuana, which means: heavenly fragrance or sending forth fragrance
