= Houma (Tongatapu) =

Village in Tongatapu, Tonga

Coordinates: 21.170°S 175.303°W

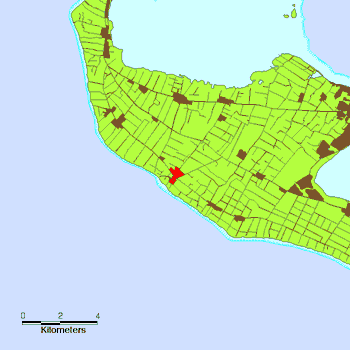
Houma (in red)

Houma is a village in Tongatapu, Tonga. It contains Mapu a Vaea. It had a population of 2086 in 2016.
