= Hufangalupe =

Coordinates: 21.2326°S 175.1907°W

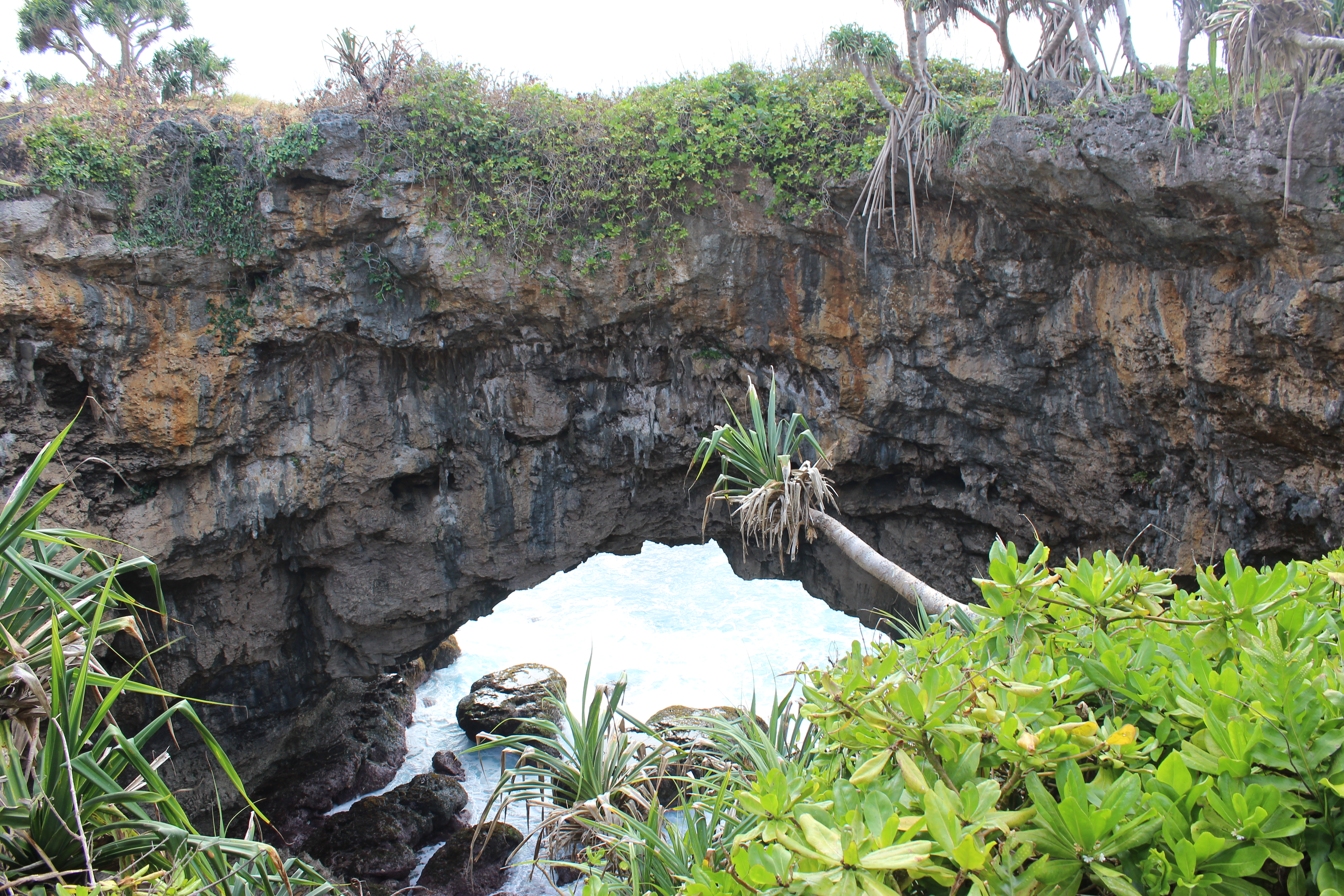
Hufangalupe

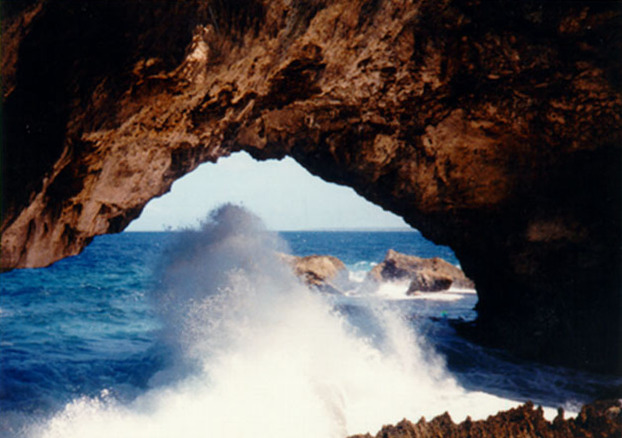

Hufangalupe is a natural land bridge on Tonga’s main island of Tongatapu.

It was formed by the collapse of the roof of a sea cave, one of many situated along the southeastern coast of the island. The waves often break dramatically near the entrance. The name Hufangalupe translates as “Pigeon’s gate”. It was used as the setting for the climax of the novel Subloon, by Dennis Paul. It is also visible in the 2014 film When the Man Went South. There is also a nearby beach of the same name. The ancient locals believe that Maui threw his spear through making a large hole in the Earth.
