= Mapu a Vaea =

Geological formations on Tongatapu, Tonga

Coordinates: 21°10′33.4″S 175°18′24.4″W

- Blowholes
- Mapu'a Vaea
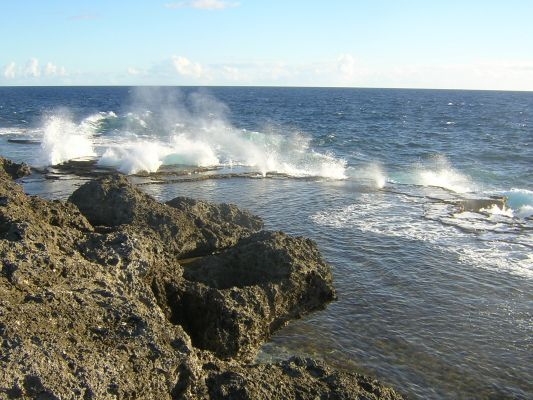
- The 'Mapu a Vaea', Blowholes
- Interactive map of Mapu a Vaea
- Location: Tongatapu, Tonga
- Nickname: Whistle of the Noble

Dimensions
  - Length: 5km

The Mapu a Vaea, also known as Mapu'a Vaea, are a chain of natural blowholes on the island of Tongatapu, located near the village of Houma in the Kingdom of Tonga. It is one of the highlights of the tours around the island of Tongatapu.

== Etymology ==
Mapu a Vaea translates to "Whistle of the Noble" or "Chief's Whistles". "Vaea" is the name of the Vaea family of nearby Houma. They are the eponymous chiefs of the translated title; as such, Mapu a Vaea has also been called the "whistle of Vaea." The name is also based on the sound of the blowholes, said to resemble the whistling of a high-ranking Tongan chief. The etymology has also been claimed to be inspired by an ancient Tongan chief who mediated by the blowholes.

== Characteristics ==
Mapu a Vaea is 5 kilometers long and consists of hundreds of blowholes, which are natural channels in the volcanic rock. These channels, when struck, forcefully channel water through themselves and upwards into the sky. When the water is in the channels, it becomes compressed, which causes it to shoot into the air with force. As each channel is unique, their characteristics are different, meaning that the amount of water and force released varies. The spray from some blowholes can reach up to 18 meters in the air, with some reaching as high as 30 meters in the air. The spray is said to create rainbows.

Mapu a Vaea was formed from several natural processes. Tongatapu is a volcanic islands with a limestone base. Thus, the channels are a mix of former volcanic tubes, limestone, and coral rock. The limestone and coral rock has been carved out due to pressure from the sea. The processes that formed Mapu a Vaea took thousands of years and is still ongoing.

== Culture ==
Mapu a Vaea is an important cultural spot for the Tongan people. It is revered due to its association with local chieftains. Mapu a Vaea has been called one of the most notable natural features in Tonga. It is also one of the most popular tourist spots on the island, and is particularly popular among photographers due to its natural beauty.
