= Hadji Trendafila =

Bulgarian school teacher

Hadji Trendafila (1785–1845) was a Bulgarian school teacher. She and her husband opened a school in Sliven in 1815, where he taught the boys and she the girls (she was herself educated in a convent). She was likely the first professional female teacher in Bulgaria.
