= Pangaimotu (Tongatapu) =

Island in Tongatapu, Tonga

Coordinates: 21.124183°S 175.158855°W

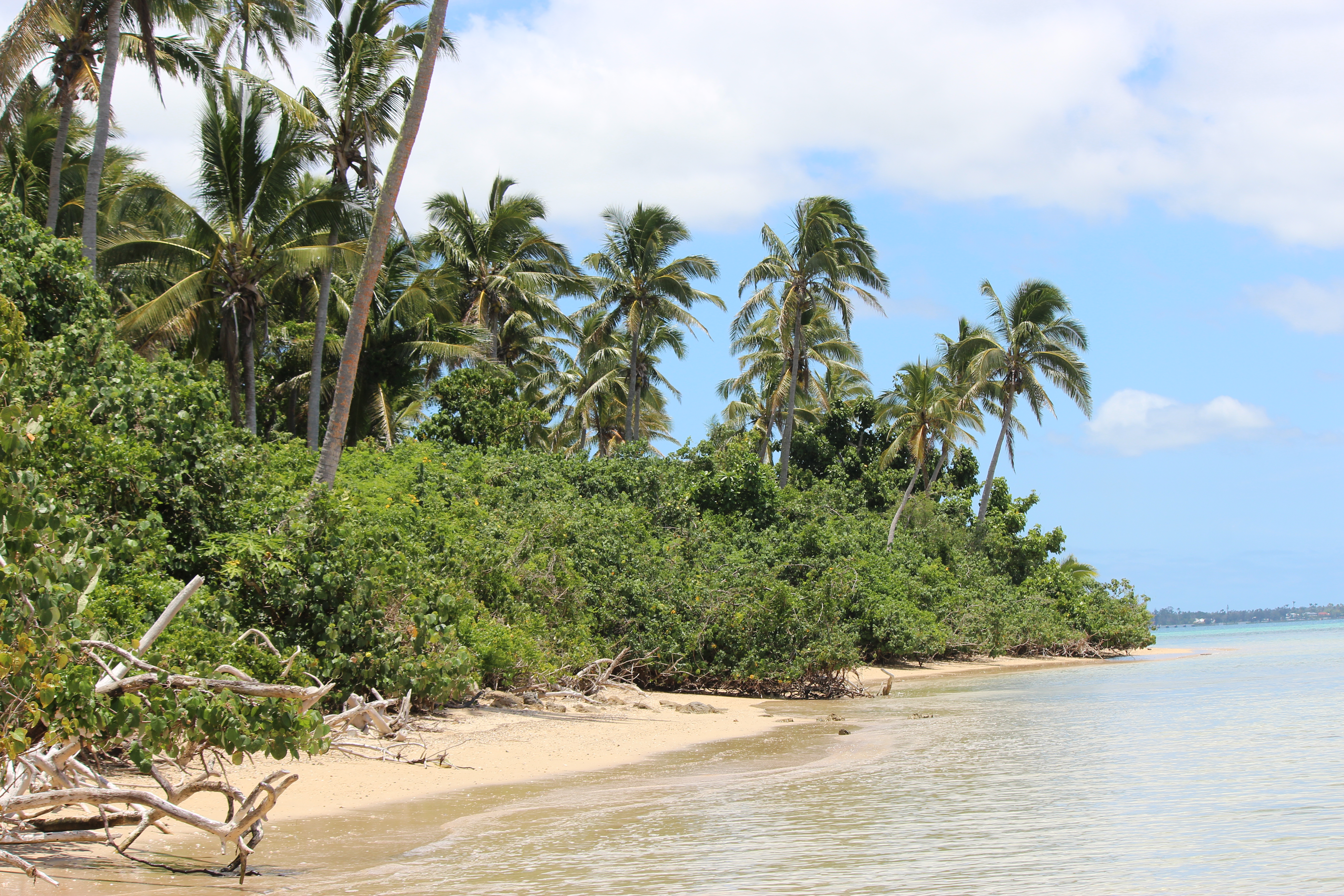
Pangaimotu Island

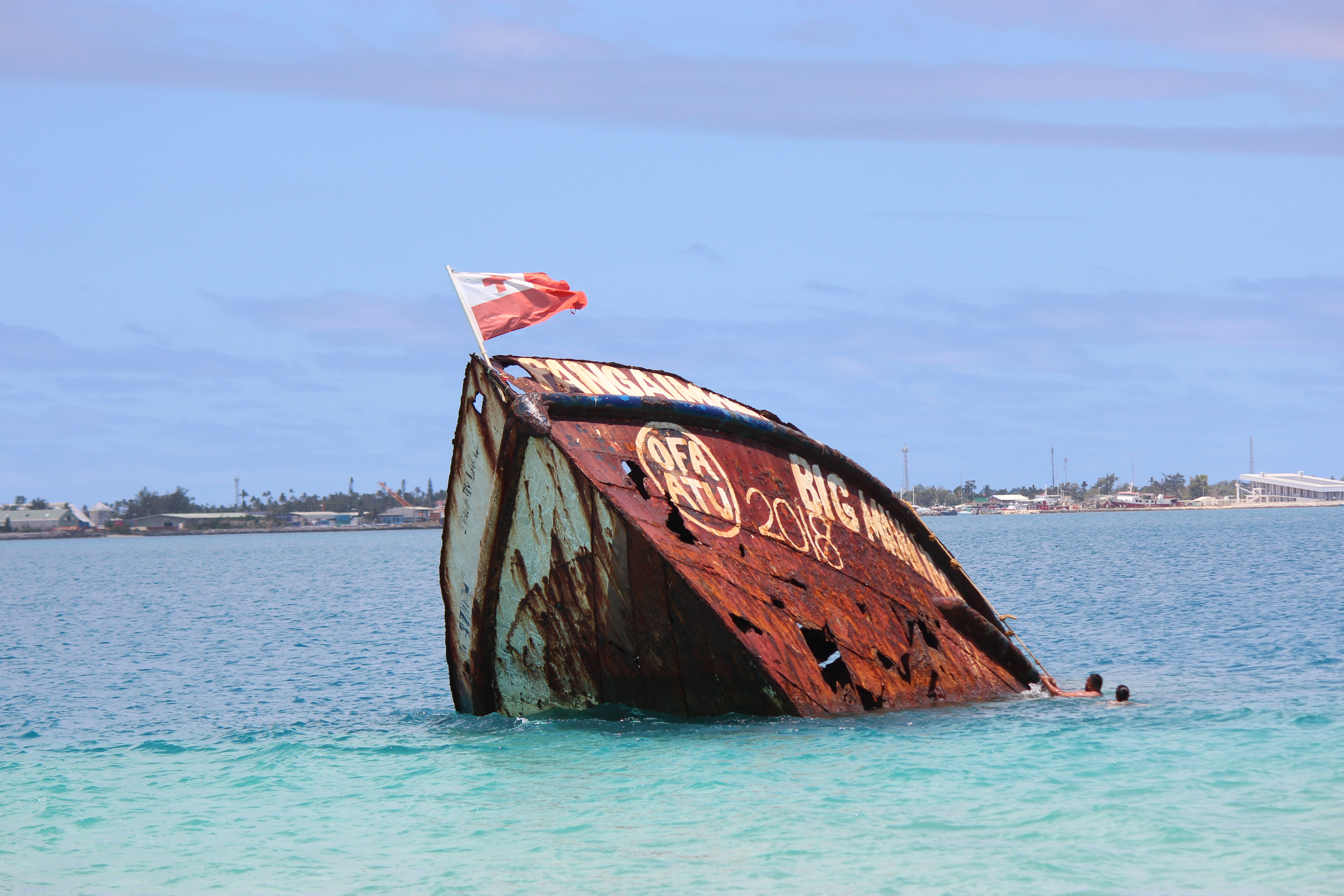
Shipwreck off Pangaimotu

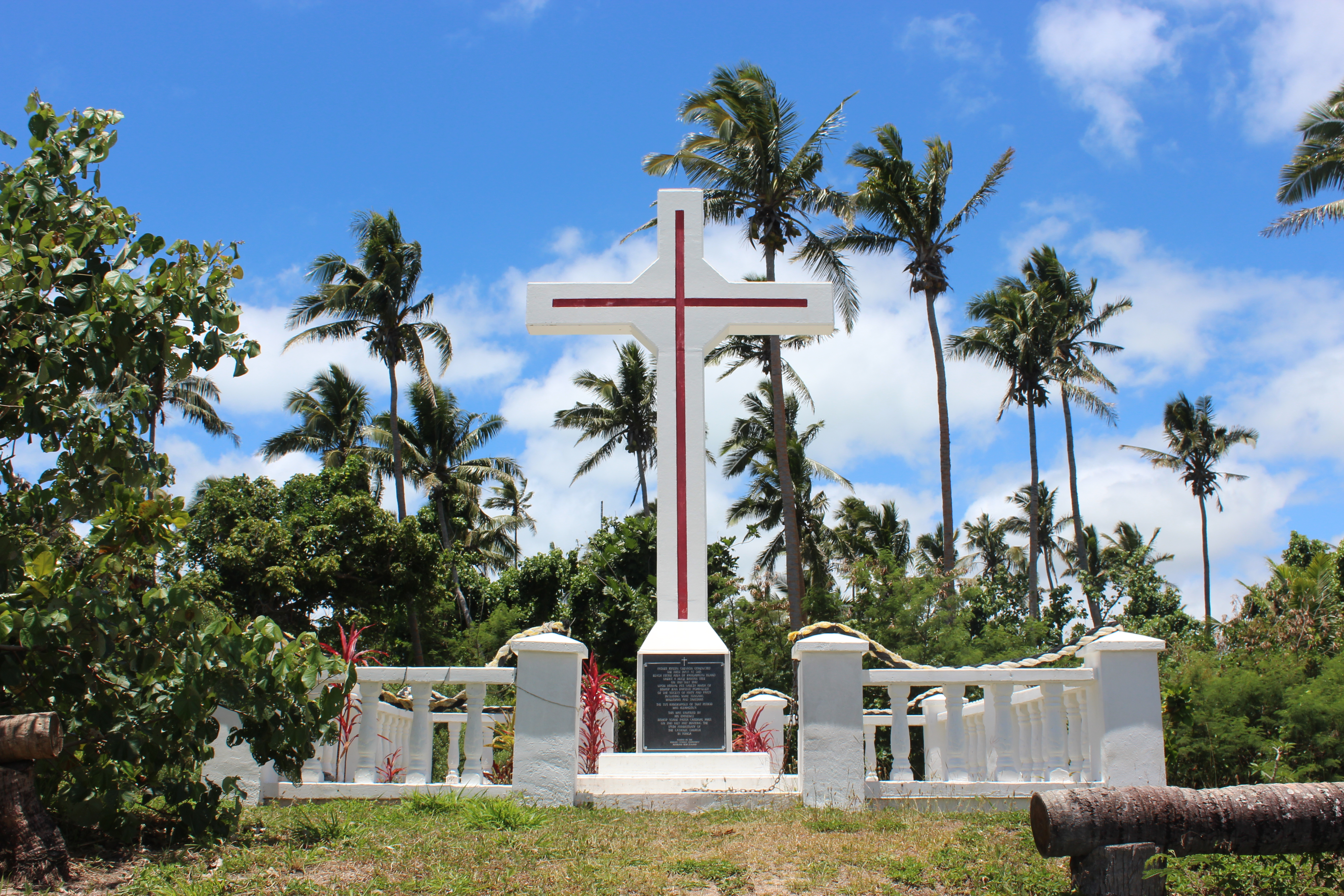
Monument to the first mass in Tonga

Pangaimotu is a small island in the Tongatapu group of Tonga, lying near the capital Nukuʻalofa. It is reachable by a 10-minute boat trip from Nukuʻalofa. Aside from the beaches, a centrepiece of the island's attraction is a wreck jumping from the hull of the upturned ship 50 metres off the island's main beach. The island also contains the Big Mama Yacht Club, the Pangaimotu Island Resort and a vanilla plantation.

The Pangaimotu reef was declared a national marine reserve in 1989.

The first mass in Tonga was held under a tree on Pangaimotu on 2 July 1842. It was conducted by Jean Baptiste Pompallier and Father Chevron.
