= Kolovai =

- Village
- Location in Tongatapu, Tonga
- Coordinates: 21°05′59.4″S 175°20′21.8″W
- Country: Tonga
- Elevation: 10 m (33 ft)

Population (2006)
  - Total: 4,098

Kolovai is a village on the Tongan island of Tongatapu. Its 2006 population was 4,098.

The village is notable for its lakalaka, the national dance of Tonga. A national monument has been proposed to preserve the site of the koka tree where members of the Tu'i Kanokupolu dynasty received investiture. It is home to a large colony of Pacific Flying Foxes, a species of fruit bat.
