= Tongatapu =

Main island of the Kingdom of Tonga

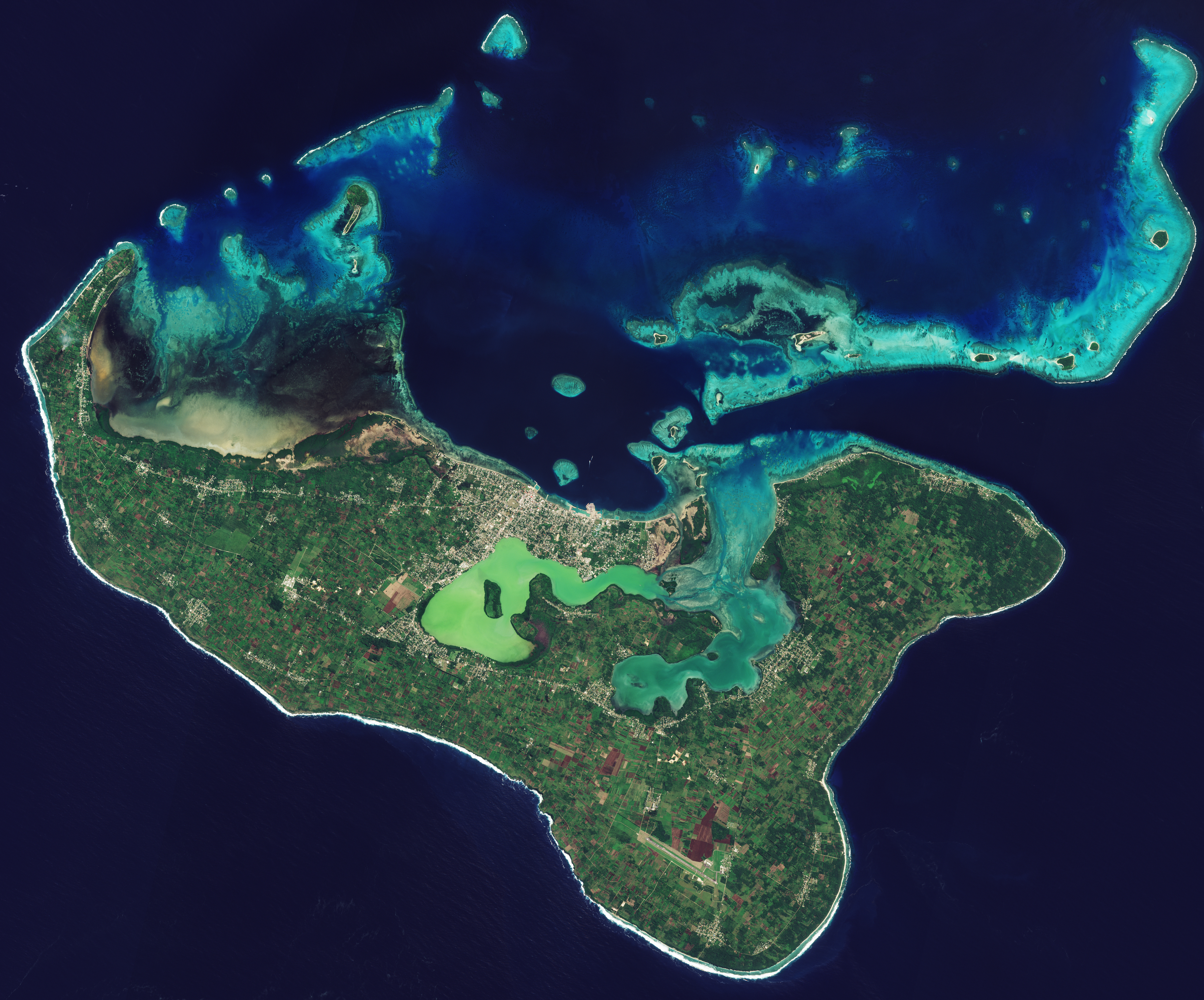
- Satellite picture of Tongatapu

Geography
- Location: Pacific Ocean
- Coordinates: 21°12′41″S 175°09′11″W
- Archipelago: Tonga Islands
- Area: 260.48 km^{2} (100.57 sq mi)

Administration
- Tonga
- Largest settlement: Nukuʻalofa (pop. 23,221)

Demographics
- Population: 74,454 (2021)
- Pop. density: 273.57/km^{2} (708.54/sq mi)
- Ethnic groups: Tongan (majority), European, Chinese, Pacific Islanders.

Tongatapu is the main island of Tonga and the site of its capital, Nukuʻalofa. Approximately 260 square kilometres (100 square miles) in size, it is located in Tonga's southern island group, to which it gives its name and it is the country's most populous island, with 74,611 residents (2016) or roughly 70.5% of the total population.

Tongatapu has experienced more rapid economic development than the other islands of Tonga, and has become a business, trade and labor center of the country.

== Geography ==
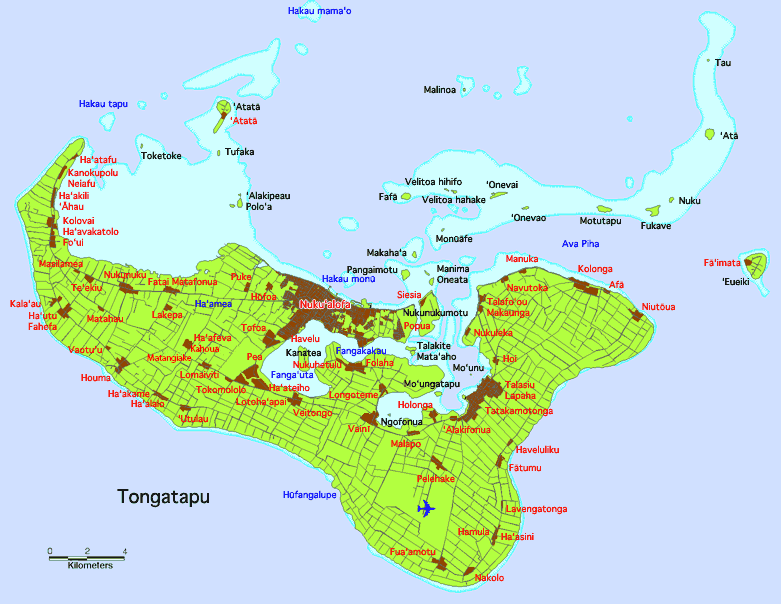
Map of Tongatapu

The island is 257.03 square kilometres (99.24 square miles) (or 260.48 square kilometres (100.57 square miles) including neighbouring islands) and rather flat, as it is built of coral limestone. The island is covered with thick fertile soil consisting of volcanic ash from neighbouring volcanoes. At the steep coast of the south, heights reach an average of 35 metres (115 feet), and maximum 70 metres (230 feet), gradually decreasing towards the north.

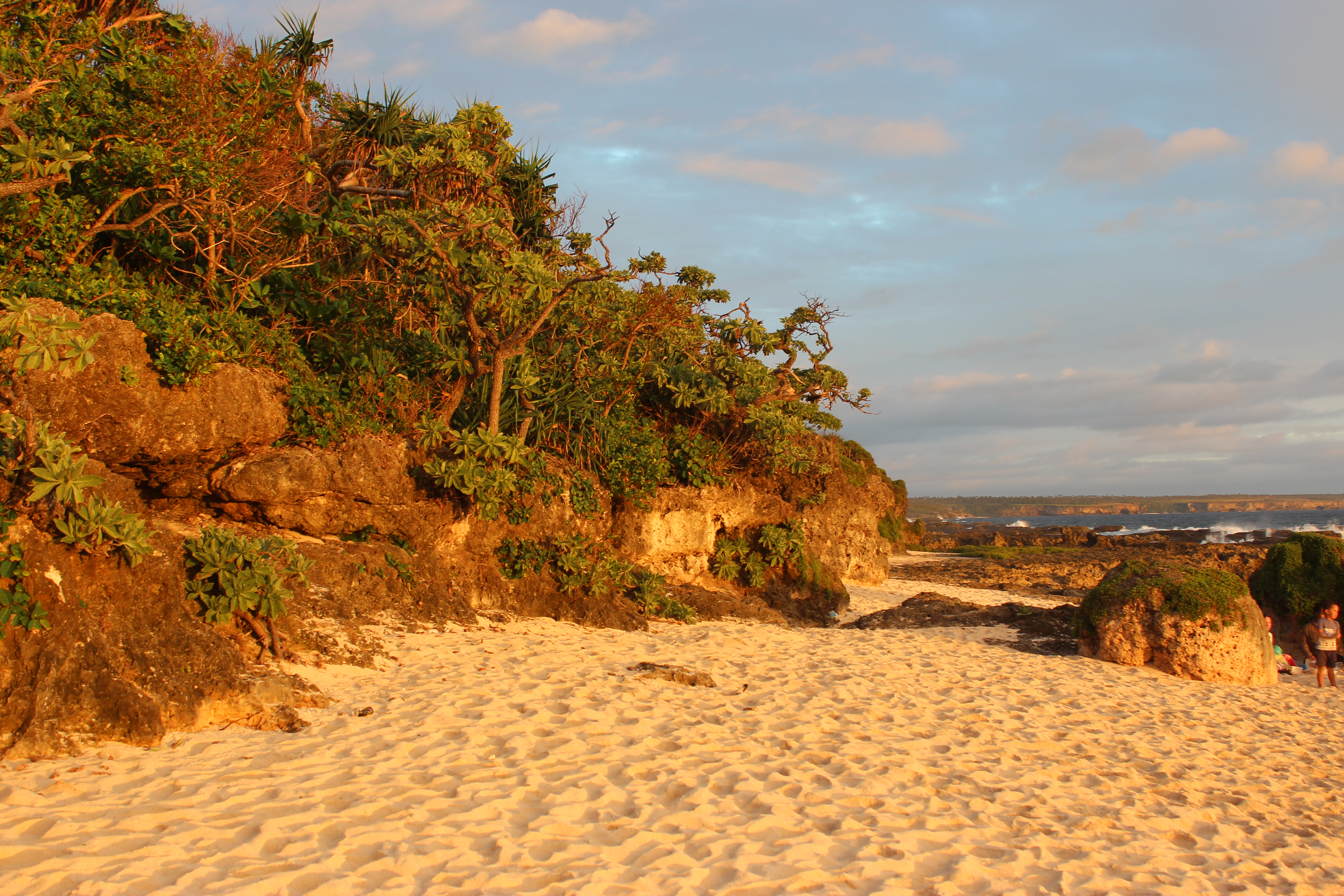
A beach on the south coast of Tongatapu

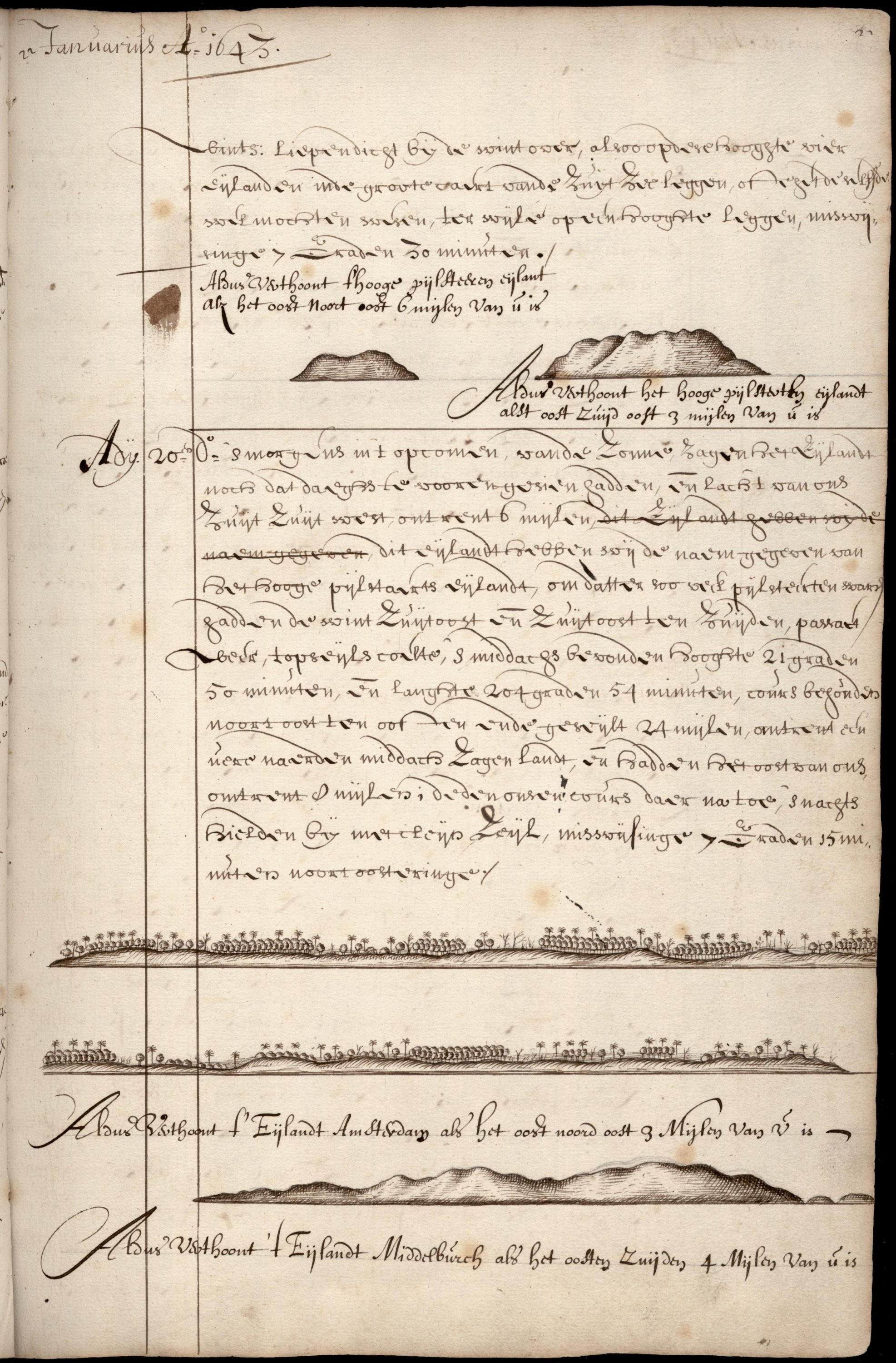
Page from the ship's log of Abel Tasman with the description of 't Eijlandt Amsterdam, nowadays Tongatapu

North of the island are many small isolated islands and coral reefs which extend up to 7 kilometres (4.3 miles) from Tongatapu's shores. The almost completely closed Fanga'uta and Fangakakau Lagoons are important breeding grounds for birds and fish as they live within the mangroves growing around the lagoon's shores. The lagoons were declared a Natural Reserve in 1974 by the government.

== Climate ==
Tongatapu has a cooler climate than the rest of Tonga because it is the southernmost island group in the country. Consequently, fruit production is lower in Tongatapu than in the warmer northern islands.

Climate data for Nukuʻalofa (Köppen Af)
Month	Jan	Feb	Mar	Apr	May	Jun	Jul	Aug	Sep	Oct	Nov	Dec	Year
Record high °C (°F)	32 (90)	32 (90)	31 (88)	30 (86)	30 (86)	28 (82)	28 (82)	28 (82)	28 (82)	29 (84)	30 (86)	31 (88)	32 (90)
Mean daily maximum °C (°F)	29.4 (84.9)	29.9 (85.8)	29.6 (85.3)	28.5 (83.3)	26.8 (80.2)	25.8 (78.4)	24.9 (76.8)	24.8 (76.6)	25.3 (77.5)	26.4 (79.5)	27.6 (81.7)	28.7 (83.7)	27.3 (81.1)
Daily mean °C (°F)	26.4 (79.5)	26.8 (80.2)	26.6 (79.9)	25.3 (77.5)	23.6 (74.5)	22.7 (72.9)	21.5 (70.7)	21.5 (70.7)	22.0 (71.6)	23.1 (73.6)	24.4 (75.9)	25.6 (78.1)	24.1 (75.4)
Mean daily minimum °C (°F)	23.4 (74.1)	23.7 (74.7)	23.6 (74.5)	22.1 (71.8)	20.3 (68.5)	19.5 (67.1)	18.1 (64.6)	18.2 (64.8)	18.6 (65.5)	19.7 (67.5)	21.1 (70.0)	22.5 (72.5)	20.9 (69.6)
Record low °C (°F)	16 (61)	17 (63)	15 (59)	15 (59)	13 (55)	11 (52)	10 (50)	11 (52)	11 (52)	12 (54)	13 (55)	16 (61)	10 (50)
Average rainfall mm (inches)	174 (6.9)	210 (8.3)	206 (8.1)	165 (6.5)	111 (4.4)	95 (3.7)	95 (3.7)	117 (4.6)	122 (4.8)	128 (5.0)	123 (4.8)	175 (6.9)	1,721 (67.8)
Average rainy days	17	19	19	17	15	14	15	13	13	11	12	15	180
Average relative humidity (%)	77	78	79	76	78	77	75	75	74	74	73	75	76
Source: Weatherbase

== History ==
=== People of the Lapita culture ===
Tongatapu is known as having one of the highest concentration of archaeological remains in the Pacific. The earliest traces of Lapita pottery found in Tonga was from around 900–850 BC, 300 years after the first settlements in Tonga were established. Archaeologist David Burley discovered the pottery around the Fanga'uta Lagoon, 2,000 kilometres (1,200 miles) away from the Lapita pottery found at Santa Cruz in the Solomon Islands.

Tonga was always the seat of the Tuʻi Tonga Empire, but in an area of distances up to 1,000 kilometres (620 miles), it was often only a symbolic rule. From the first capital at Toloa, around 1000 years ago, to the second capital at Heketā, at the site of the Haʻamonga ʻa Maui Trilithon, none boasts more traditional attractions than the third capital at Muʻa (from 1220–1851) with more than 20 royal grave mounds.

=== Europeans ===
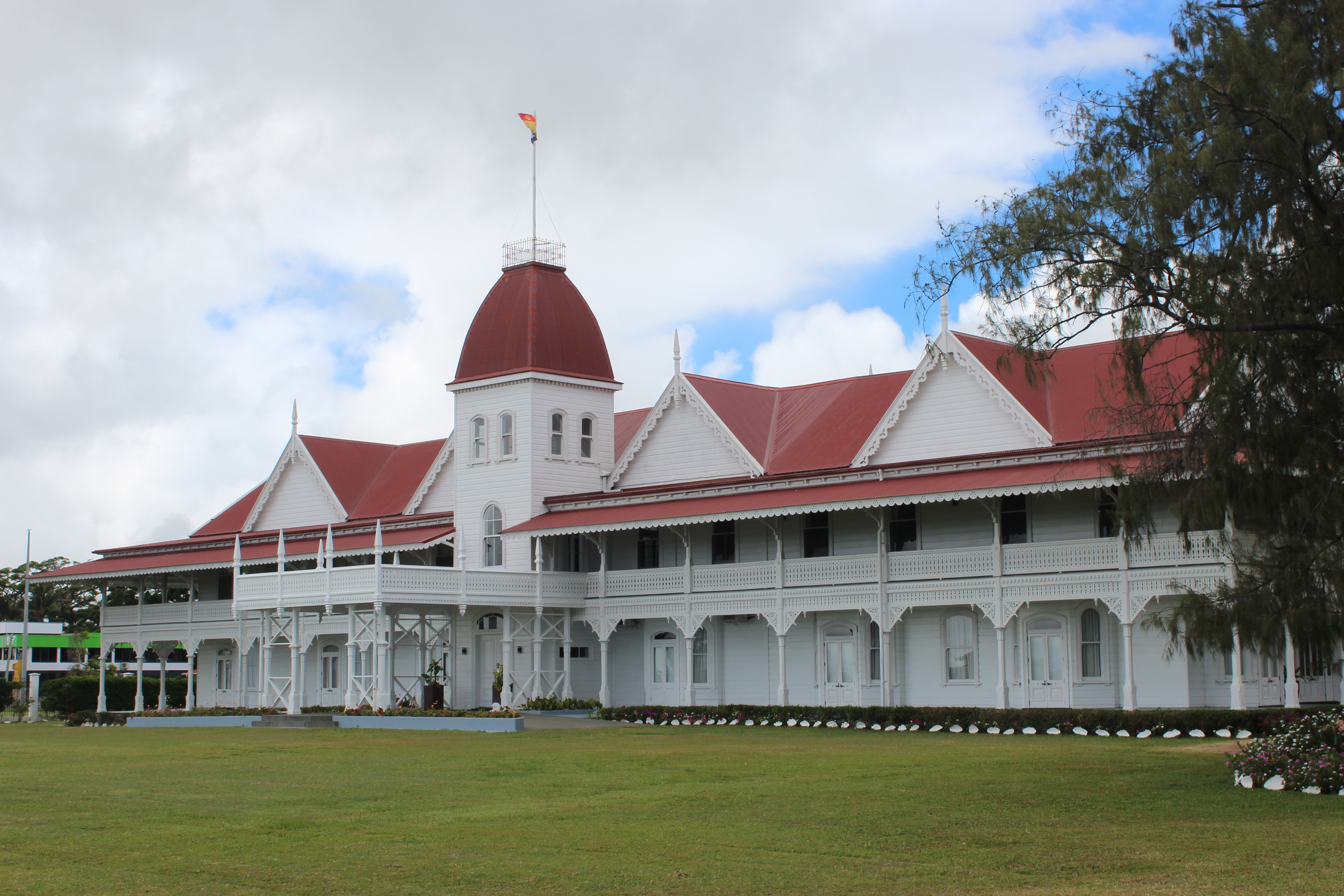
Royal Palace

Tongatapu was first sighted by Europeans on 20 January 1643 by Abel Tasman commanding two ships, the Heemskerck and the Zeehaen commissioned by the Dutch East India Company of Batavia (Jakarta). The expedition's goals were to chart the unknown southern and eastern seas and to find a possible passage through the South Pacific and Indian Ocean providing a faster route to Chile. The expedition set sail from Batavia on 14 August 1642. Tasman named the island "t’ Eijlandt Amsterdam" (Amsterdam Island), because of its abundance of supplies. This name is no longer used except by historians.

Commander James Cook, sailing the British vessel Resolution visited the island on October 2, 1773 by some accounts and by other accounts October 1774, returning again in 1777, with Omai, whereupon they left some cattle for breeding. These were still flourishing in 1789 when Bounty, under Fletcher Christian visited.

The earliest mention of the name Tongatapu (spelled "Tongataboo" in the text) was by James Cook in 1777, as he wrote his memoirs for the Three Voyages Around the World, Volume 1.

British and American whalers were regular visitors to the island for provisions, water and wood. The first on record was the Hope, in April–May 1807. The last known to have called was the Albatross in November–December 1899.

Historical population
Year	Pop.	±%
1976	57,411	—
1986	63,794	+11.1%
1996	66,979	+5.0%
2006	72,045	+7.6%
2011	75,416	+4.7%
2016	74,611	−1.1%
2021	74,454	−0.2%

== Main sites ==
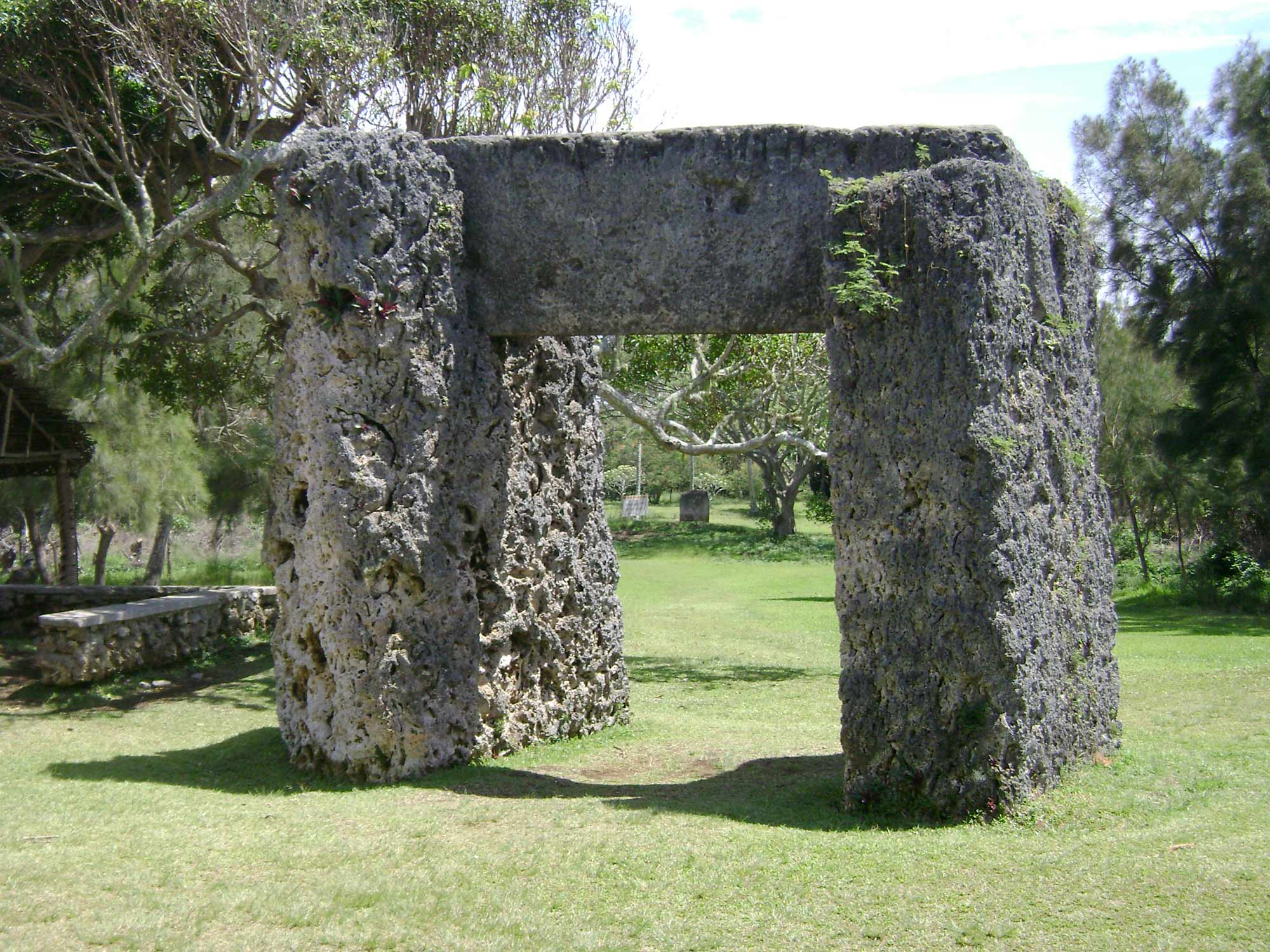
Haʻamonga ʻa Maui Trilithon.

- Nukuʻalofa – Capital of Tonga
- Muʻa – Second largest town in Tongatapu. Site of the ancient burial mounds and the Papae 'o Tele'a Tombs.
- Langi – Tombs of Tongan kings
- Hule fortress – Located in Nukunuku - Kolotau Ko Hule - Western District of Tongatapu
- Mapu ʻa Vaea – Blowholes in the coral reef on the south-western side
- Hūfangalupe – Natural landbridge on the south eastern side of Tongatapu
- Pangaimotu – Small resort island close to Nukuʻalofa
- Landing site of Captain Cook
- Flying Fox Preserve – Located in Kolovai in the western side Taungapeka
- Haʻamonga ʻa Maui – Trilithon
- Nukuleka – possibly the site of first Lapita settlement in Tonga
- Tupou College – first educational establishment in the kingdom located in the eastern district of Tongatapu near Malapo

== See also ==
- List of islands and towns in Tonga
- Sunergise 6 MW IPP Solar Generation Systems, installed at Kolovai village
