= Sālote Lupepauʻu =

Queen consort of Tonga

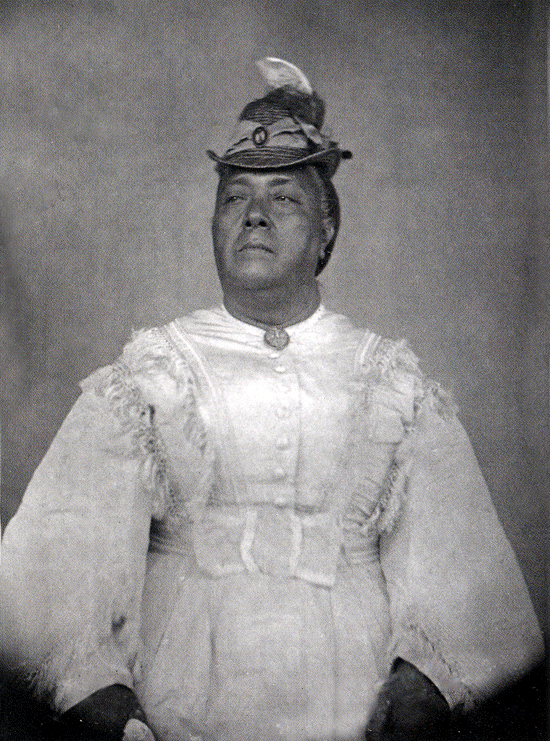
- Queen Sālote in 1874, portrait taken by Frederick Hodgeson, official photographer of the Challenger expedition

Queen consort of Tonga
- Tenure: 4 December 1845 – 8 September 1889
- Born: c. 1811
- Died: 8 September 1889 (aged 77–78); Royal Palace, Nukuʻalofa, Tonga
- Burial: Malaʻekula
- Spouse: Laufilitonga; George Tupou I
- Issue: Tu'ukitau; Vuna Takitakimālohi
- House: House of Tupou
- Father: Tamatauʻhala, Makamālohi
- Mother: Halaʻevalu Moheʻofo

Sālote Lupepauʻu (c. 1811 – 8 September 1889) was Queen of Tonga from 1845 to 1889 as the wife of George Tupou I. She was the namesake of the Queen Salote College.

== Life ==
Born around 1811, Lupepauʻu was the daughter of Tamatauʻhala, Makamālohi and Halaʻevalu Moheʻofo. Her father was the son of the daughter of the Tuʻi Tonga Fefine and her mother was the daughter of Fīnau ʻUlukālala II ʻi Feletoa. Lupepauʻu was considered to be of high sino'i 'eiki rank in the traditional order. From an early age, she was married to Laufilitonga, the last holder of the title Tuʻi Tonga. Tāufaʻāhau (the future George Tupou I) eloped with Lupepauʻu sometime after Laufilitonga's defeat at Battle of Velata against the forces of Tāufaʻāhau. After his adoption of Christianity, Tāufaʻāhau repudiated all his secondary consorts and their children and made Lupepauʻu his principal wife. After their conversion, Tāufaʻāhau took the name George Tupou I in honor of King George III of the United Kingdom while Lupepauʻu was named Sālote or Charlotte after Queen Charlotte of the United Kingdom.

With George Tupou I, she had two sons: Tuʻuakitau (1839–1842) and Vuna Takitakimālohi (1844–1862). Their children were the only heirs of Tupou I considered legitimate and eligible to succeed to the Tonga throne under Christian law and the childless death of Vuna in 1862 left the question of succession. The succession would remain vacant for thirteen years until the promulgation of Tonga's first constitution in 1875, which legitimized Tupou's illegitimate son Tēvita ʻUnga and named him Crown Prince.

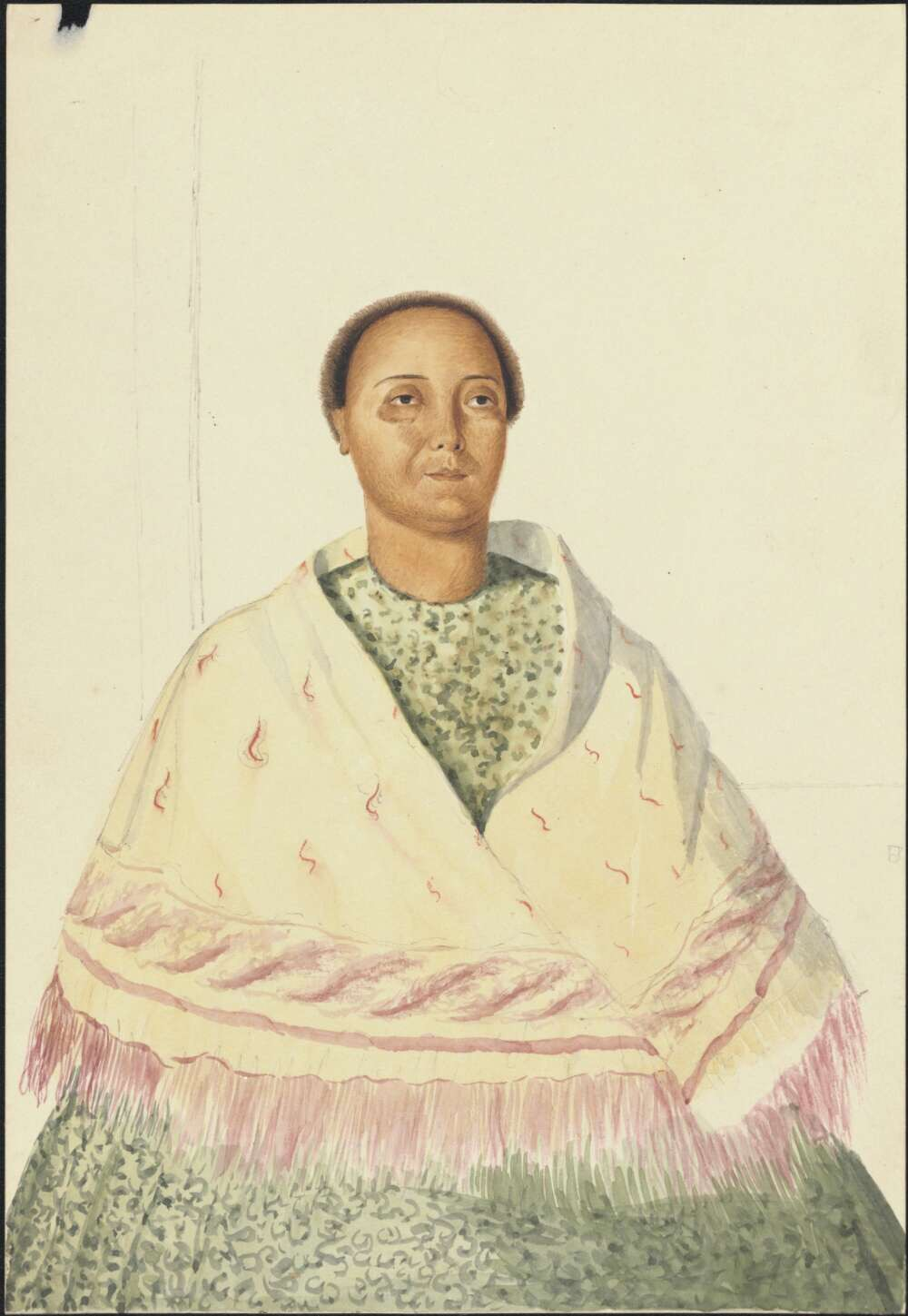
1854 watercolor portrait by James Gay Sawkins

In 1854, she sat for a watercolor portrait painted by British geologist James Gay Sawkins.

Lupepauʻu died on 8 September 1889. In 1914, the Kolisi Fefine was renamed Queen Salote College in her honor. The name Sālote would become a recurring tradition in the Tongan royal family. Her husband's great-great granddaughter Sālote Tupou III, however, was named after her great-grandmother Sālote Mafile‘o Pilolevu, one of Tupou I's daughters by another woman.

== Bibliography ==
- Ledyard, Patricia (1982). The Tongan Past. Vava'u, Tonga: Distributed by Matheson. ISBN 9780908717026. OCLC 13112650.
- Marcus, George E. (1978). "The Nobility and the Chiefly Tradition in the Modern Kingdom of Tonga". The Journal of the Polynesian Society. 42. Wellington: The Polynesian Society. OCLC 240852997.
- Spurway, John (2015). Ma'afu, Prince of Tonga, Chief of Fiji: A Life of Fiji's First Tui Lau. Canberra: Australian National University Press. ISBN 978-1-925021-18-9. OCLC 879538614.
- Wood-Ellem, Elizabeth (1999). Queen Sālote of Tonga: The Story of an Era 1900–1965. Auckland, N.Z: Auckland University Press. ISBN 978-0-8248-2529-4. OCLC 262293605.

New creation	Queen consort of Tonga; 1845–1889	Succeeded by Lavinia Veiongo
