= James G. Sawkins =

British artist (1806–1878)

James Gay Sawkins
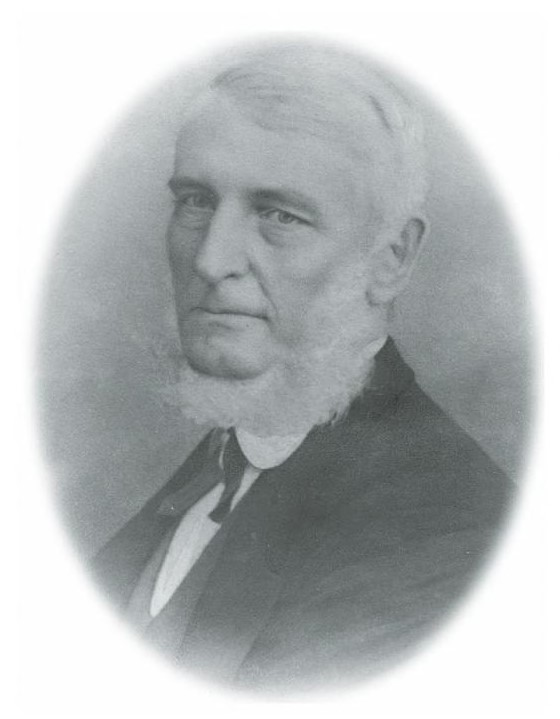
- 19th century photograph of Sawkins
- Born: 1806; Southampton, England
- Died: 20 July 1878 (aged 71–72); London, England
- Occupations: Geologist; artist; copper miner; illustrator
- Known for: Geology research of Jamaica; Testifying against Joseph Warren Revere on a Naval Court of Inquiry
- Spouse(s): Jane Grace Andras (m. 1822) Octavia "Rosa" Sawkins Mary Hussey Brodie (m. 1855)

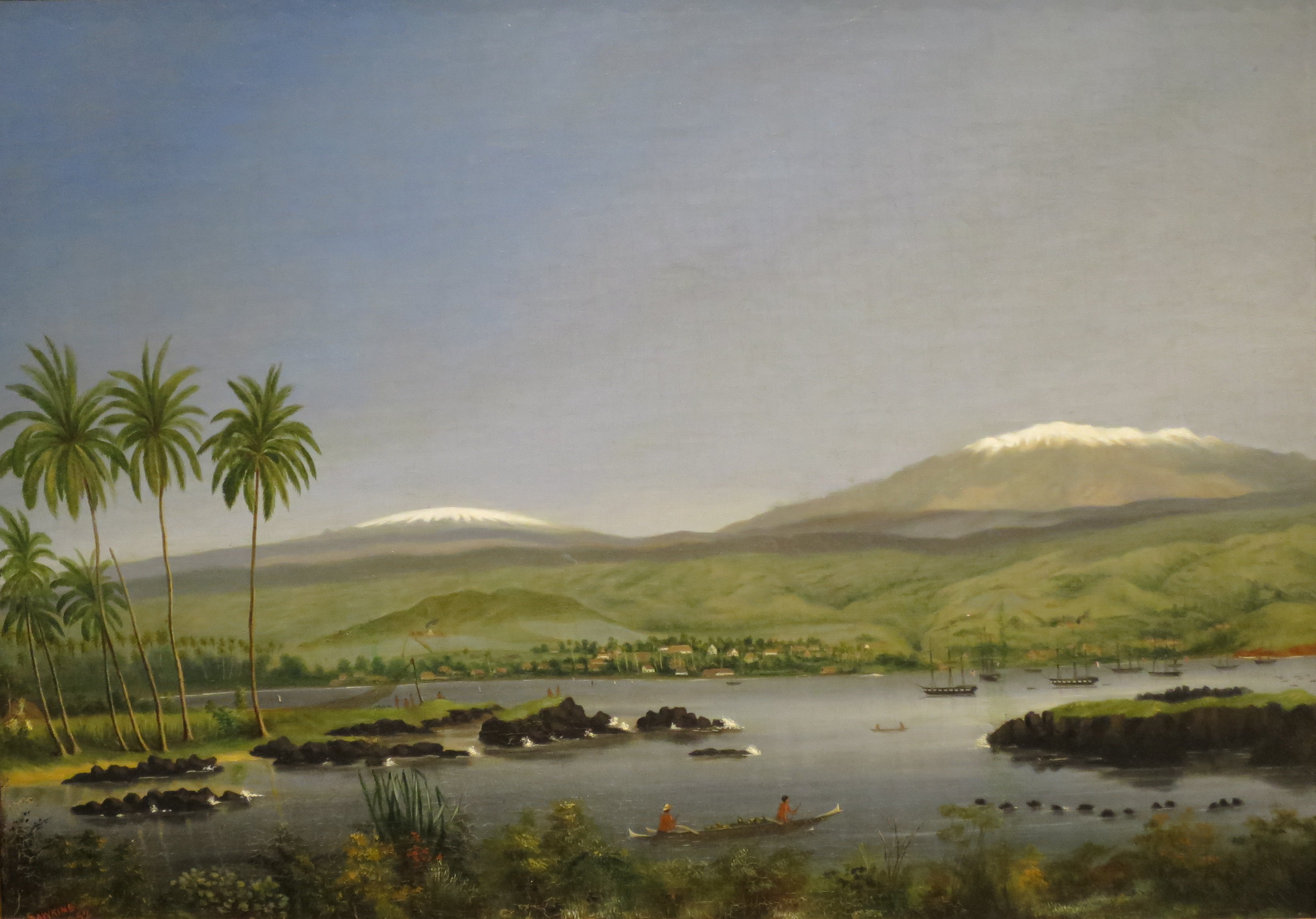
Hilo from the Bay, oil on canvas painting by James Gay Sawkins, 1852

James Gay Sawkins (1806 – July 20, 1878) was a British artist, geologist, copper miner, and illustrator. He was a member of the Geological Society of London who joined and led research during England's West Indian Geological Surveys of the islands of Trinidad and Jamaica. He also worked in the mining industries of Jamaica, Peru, Hawaii, and Australia.

Circa 1849, Sawkins testified against Navy general Joseph Warren Revere in a Naval Court of Inquiry due to Revere's possible affair with his wife, Octavia "Rosa" Sawkins.

Afterwards, from 1859 to 1862, he worked under English naturalist Lucas Barrett on the Jamaican Geological Survey, which was part of England's geology research of the West Indies. After Barrett's untimely death in 1862, Sawkins took over as the leader of the research team.

In 1950, geologist H. R. Hose claimed Sawkin's 1869 Reports on the Geology of Jamaica "form the basis of all subsequent work in Jamaica." For example, in 2021, Sawkins's 1869 research was used by wildlife ecologist Dr. Susan Koenig to persuade NEPA to protect the Jamaican Cockpit Country from bauxite mining.

In 2011, Nicholas Mirzoeff stated that "Sawkins's careful anthropological style...concentrated on observation rather than moral commentary." The Honolulu Museum of Art, Mission House Museum (Honolulu, Hawaii) and the National Library of Australia (Canberra) are among the public collections holding works by James Gay Sawkins.

== Personal life ==
Sawkins was born in 1806 in Southampton, England. He was a native of Yeovil, a town in Somerset, England. At the age of 14, he moved to Baltimore, Maryland, with his family, where he made his living painting miniature portraits on ivory. He achieved a professorship of drawing at an unspecified Virginia college. In his youth, he travelled to "regions west of the Mississippi", which had only been acquired by the U.S. in 1803. He briefly lived in New Orleans, Louisiana.

He visited Hawaii from January, 1850 to June, 1852. After working in Australia, he returned to England in 1855.

At the age of 18, Sawkins married Jane Grace Andras in Baltimore, Maryland. The couple had two daughters. Despite the belief that his wife died some time before 1849, she outlived James, dying sometime after the 1880 census when she was living in Canton, Mississippi with her grandson Harvey Otto. Nevertheless, this marriage would later complicate his allegations against Revere.

Some time before 1849, Sawkins married Octavia "Rosa" Sawkins, a British teacher from Nassau, New Providence. The couple exhibited unusual behavior which bordered on psychological abuse. Gold rush hopeful Andrew S. Church described his candid 1849 observation of the Sawkins couple in his 1901 Memoirs:

[It] was evident that an angry discussion was under way, as the shrieking treble would not be silenced at the command of one we took to be an Englishman...[Rosa] was weeping and pleading "to go back home" while the man was swinging his arms and explaining excitedly, "My God, it is impossible, it cannot be." Soon the lady rushed out of the modern rocking-chair in which she had been performing antics worthy of a circus, and ran into the adobe building where we heard a door slam and a bolt snap. Then the man [James] noticed us, saying, "How do you do, Gentlemen, are you from the city?"

The above occurred in November 1849. Church describes Rosa Sawkins as "young lady" with a "surly companion", claiming "[James] Sawkins appeared little inclined to allow any comradeship with his wife" including objecting to Church's attempt to offer her his overcoat during a windy boat ride.

On March 27, 1855, Sawkins married Mary Hussey Brodie, daughter of British Whig politician William Bird Brodie.

== Career ==
=== Illustrations ===
From 1830 to 1835, Sawkins lived in Mexico, earning his wealth as a painter while researching mineral resources of the country.

After briefly living in New Orleans, Sawkins lived in Cuba from 1835 to 1845, where he made living from art commissions as well as mineral operations.

In 1837, Sawkins created various scenic and architectural illustrations of Mitla, Mexico, for historian Brantz Mayer's nonfiction book, Observations on Mexican History and Archaeology, With a Special Notice of Zapotec Remains. The book was published by Smithsonian Contributions to Knowledge in June 1856.

Sawkins's illustrations of Mitla, Mexico

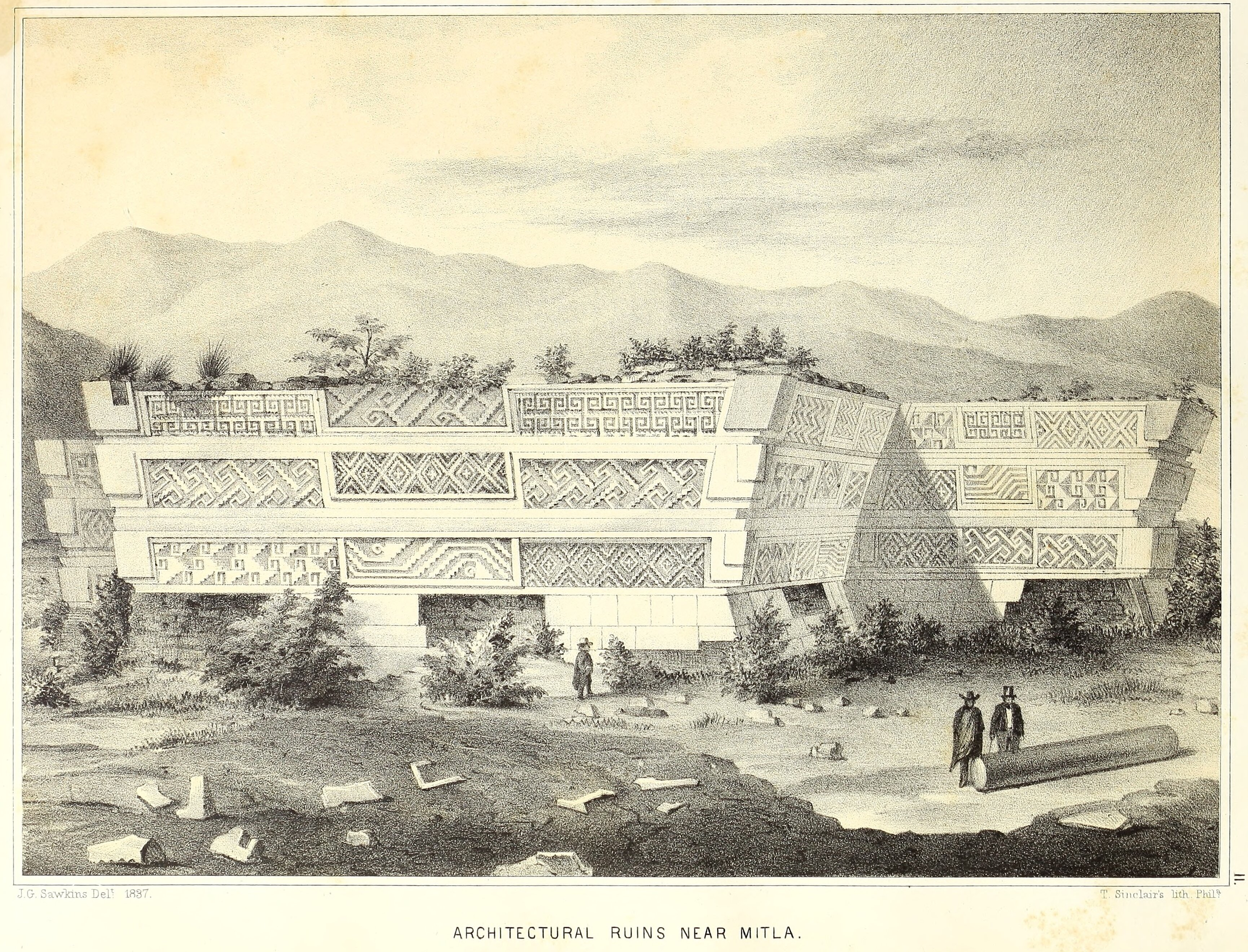

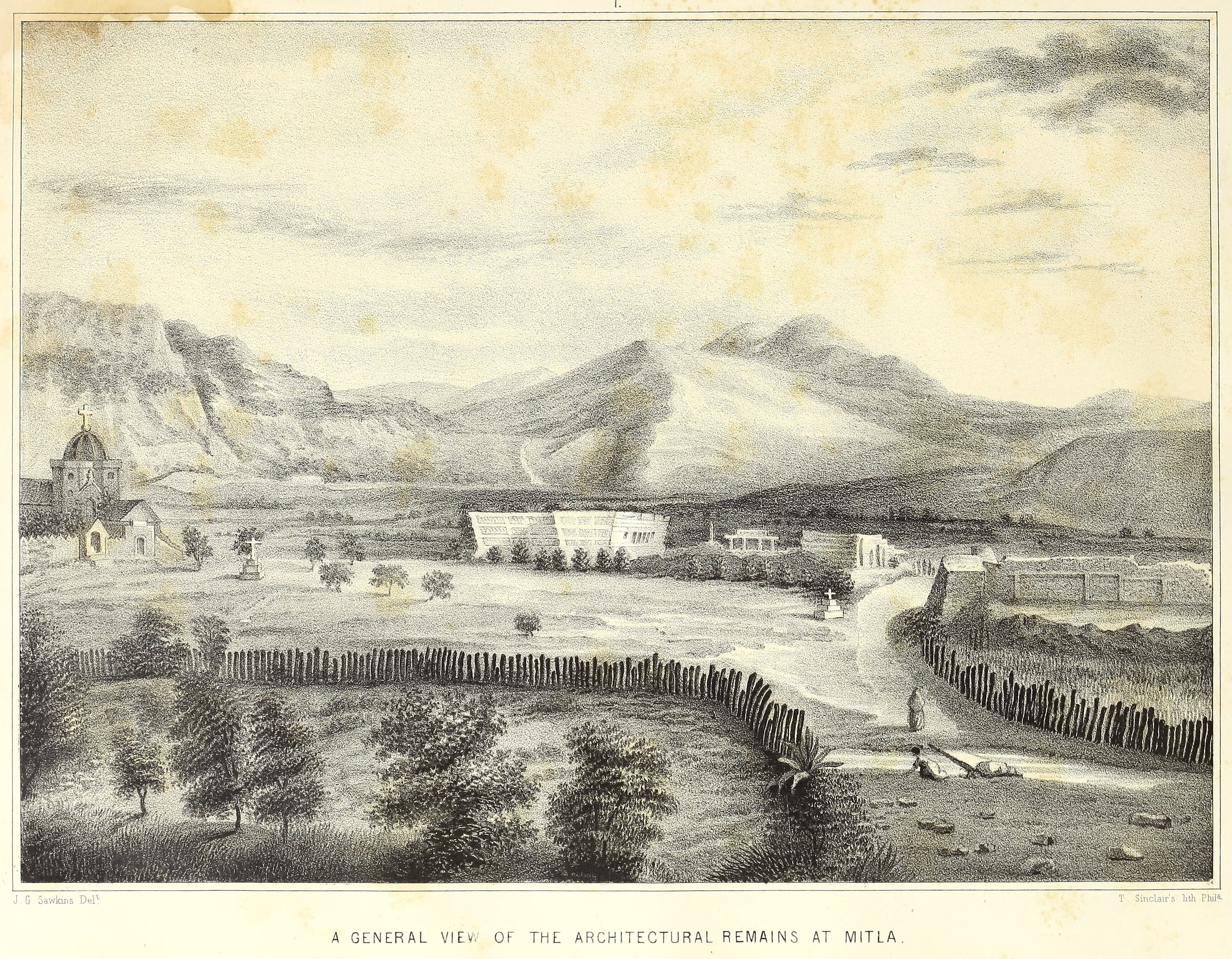

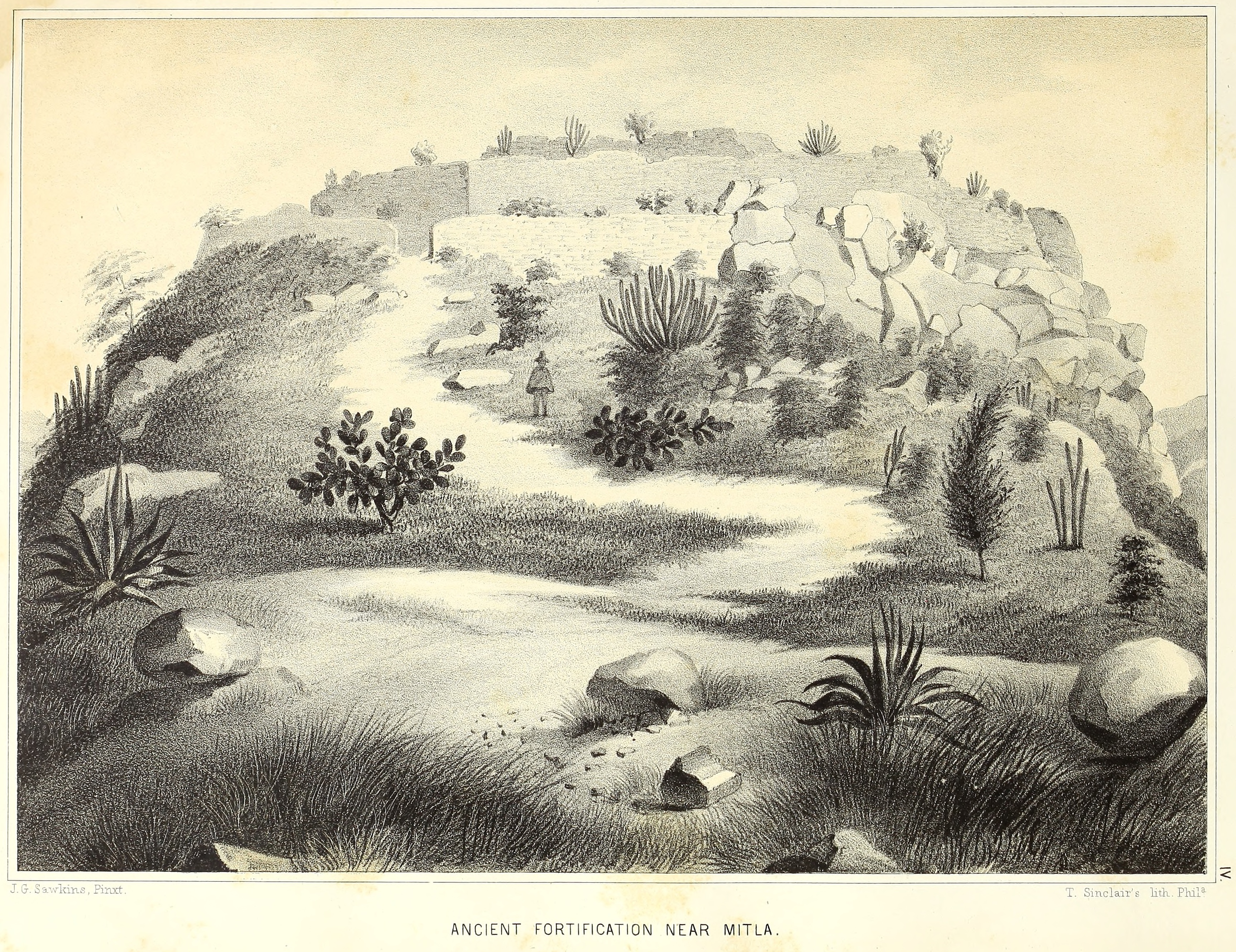

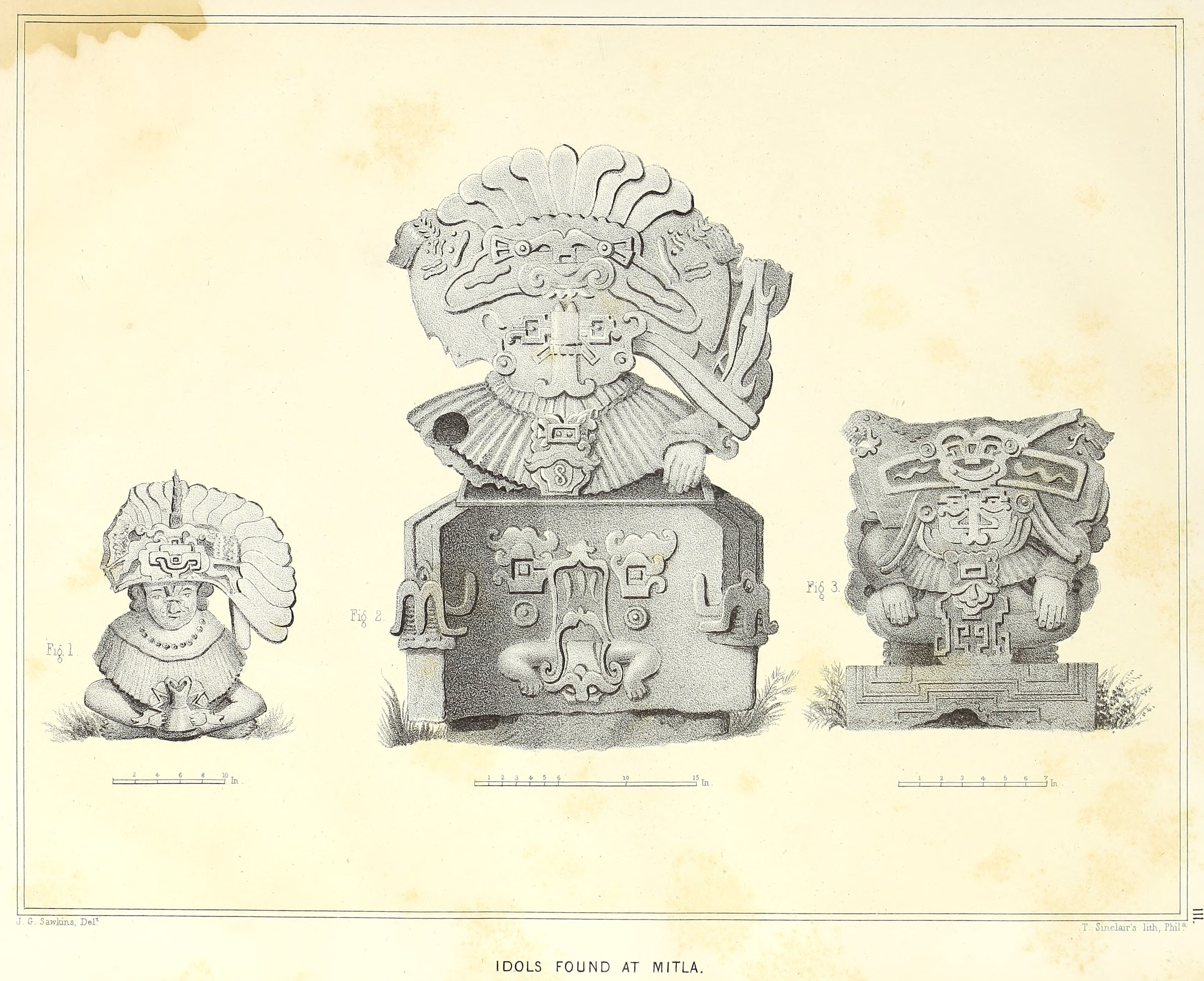

In 1847, Sawkins taught art lessons and sold portraits and Mexican landscapes in Charlotte Amalie, the capital city of the island of St. Thomas. According to visual theorist Nicholas Mirzoeff, Sawkins's artworks inspired Camille Pissarro, a French painter born in St. Thomas.

=== Geology ===
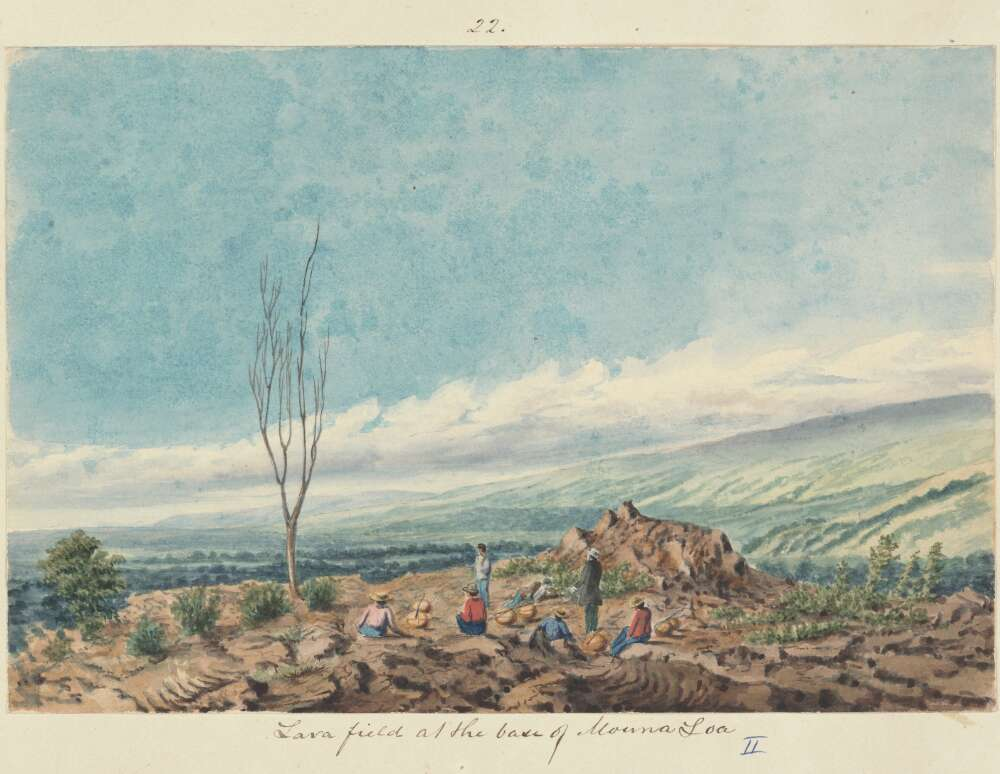
Lava field at the base of Mauna Loa, 1855, watercolor by Sawkins

Sawkins did not have a formal education in geology; he likely learned through autonomous research and running various mineral operations in Cuba and Peru.

The 1848 announcement of gold in California led him to move to the state the same year, representing a Peruvian mining corporation. Shortly afterward, he organized a Naval Court of Inquiry against Revere, one of his tenants. His gold rush undertaking failed, and he subsequently became a mine inspector in Hawaii and Queensland, Australia.

In 1854, Sawkins visited the island of Tongatapu to examine the damage caused by an earthquake. During this time, he created a portrait of Tongatapu "Queen Charlotte", a.k.a. Sālote Lupepauʻu.

In 1857, the Colonial Office in London set up the West Indian Geological Survey, a geology research team. The first area of interest was the island of Trinidad. The Director of the group was George Parks Wall, assisted by James Gay Sawkins, an American working as a copper miner in Jamaica. Wall resigned in 1859 following the completion of the Trinidad research. Sawkins must still have been interested, as he signed up for the next archaeological survey: Jamaica. The group would be led by 22-year-old English geologist Lucas Barrett.

On April first, 1859, James G. Sawkins and his wife Mary Brodie Sawkins arrived at St. Thomas, Jamaica via a mail steamer; they had sailed from the Port-of-Spain, Trinidad and Tobago. Sawkins brought scientific instruments used in his geological survey of Trinidad. Here, they met Alice Maria Barrett and her husband Lucas Barrett, the leader of the geological expedition. During this meeting, Sawkins learned he would not receive sufficient pay. Upon arriving in Kingston, Jamaica on April fifth, Sawkins arranged a meeting with John Peter Grant, then colonial governor of Jamaica. After Barrett wrote a persuasive letter to statesman Edward Bulwer-Lytton asking to increase Sawkins's pay so he would not resign, Sawkins's pay was increased and he remained on the project.

In 1859, Sawkins and C. B. Brown found gold in specimens of copper carbonate at the Stamford Hill or Charing Cross Mines north-east of May Pen, Jamaica.

In 1860, G. P. Wall published Report on the geology of Trinidad; or, Part I. of the West Indian survey, compiled by himself and Sawkins. The results were not satisfactory to British geologist Roderick Murchison. As a result, Murchison refused to elect the leader of the next survey, which indirectly meant he would not promote Sawkins. Paleontologist Stephen Donovan claims, "It is perhaps inevitable that Sawkins should feel some disappointment, a sense of frustration, perhaps bitterness against the authorities who had failed to promote him, and had put a very young man [Lucas Barrett] over him."

In 1869, Sawkins published Reports on the Geology of Jamaica which sets out a definitive map and results of the new group's 1859–1869 research. The decade's research was conducted by Sawkins, G. P. Wall, Lucas Barrett, Arthur Lennox, and C. B. Brown. On April 12, 1869, Roderick I. Murchison succinctly described Barrett's and Sawkins's leadership:

Mr. Lucas Barrett, a young palæontologist of merit, was appointed to the vacant place, and he, in conjunction with Mr. Sawkins, had made considerable progress in a brief period, particularly by correlating the organic remains of the Jamaica limestones with their congeners in Europe, when unfortunately he was drowned whilst searching in a diving bell for marine remains beneath the sea. Mr. Sawkins then became the Director of the Survey, aided for a short time by Mr. Arthur Lennox, who, having soon retired from ill health, was replaced by Mr. Brown, the present associate of Mr. Sawkins in preparing this volume with its maps and diagrams.

In 1871, he published Geological Observations of British Guiana (today known as Guyana) in the Quarterly Journal of the Geological Society of London. At this time, he retired to London, England.

== Allegations against Revere ==
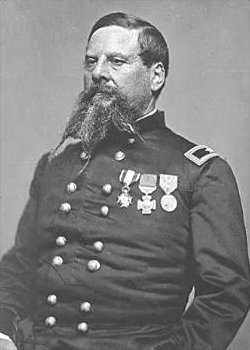
Sawkins testified against Joseph Warren Revere due to Revere's possible affair with Octavia "Rosa" Sawkins.

Circa 1849, Sawkins housed various renters at his home in San Rafael, California, including gold rush hopefuls such as Andrew S. Church. One of Sawkins's tenants was Joseph Warren Revere, a Navy general and the grandson of Paul Revere.

After a series of incidents which he later testified, James Sawkins suspected that Rosa Sawkins and Revere had entered into an affair. He assembled a Naval Board of Inquiry composed of officer James Glynn, officer Charles W. Pickering, and judge William E. Levy to convene on the USS Warren to "inquire into the truth of the serious allegations" against Revere.

During the trial, witnesses described seeing Sawkins and Revere sitting together on a hammock, frequently meeting in Sawkins's room, and visiting the house of Chapita Miranda together (described during the court proceeding as "a house of ill fame", "an improper place").

On November 26, 1849, James Sawkins entered his home and greeted Revere with a handshake, noticing he was "trembling and cold". Sawkins testified:

Entering my wife's room, she was sitting in a rocking chair with her head inclined down. Putting my hand on her table I asked her what was the matter. That she received with an expression of countenance I never saw her before. "James, I am no longer your wife; don't come near me; don't touch me; hate me, for I hate you. I will never live with you again."

James said he ran to a nearby Mr. Murphy and asked what had happened. He claimed Mr. Murphy led him to the veranda and said, "Chloroform or some damnable drug has been given to your poor wife." When James found that the laudanum bottle in the medicine cabinet was empty, he asked his wife what became of it and she said she drank it, i.e. attempted suicide. James Sawkins "became alarmed for her mind", because he recalled her mother had also had some type of psychosis.

The next morning, Rosa did not allow James to force her into her room, leading to a physical altercation in which both fell to the ground. Rosa left the home. James and Revere set out via horseback to find her, but did not succeed. They searched again at dawn.

Three days later, James led a search party into the woods, where a carman informed James that Rosa had escaped to Pacheco, California. James brought Rosa back to the house and promised to get her a lawyer so that a divorce could be filed.

The following day, James began to suspect that Rosa Sawkins and Revere had had an affair. Rosa asked James not to injure Revere, blaming herself for her actions and mental health.

James Sawkins claimed that Rosa Sawkins said,

I gave myself up to Revere, what passed I scarcely know, but remorse was too great to bear. I flew to the Laudinum bottle and emptied it at one draught in the hopes of killing myself. Oh, that I had died, but now I love him; yes, James, to the bottom of my soul and I will live for him alone.

Rosa Sawkins was denied work as a teacher as a result of the case.

In the end, Revere was charged with "having deprived Mr. James G. Sawkins of his wife", Rosa Sawkins. This led to his resignation; he was later Court-martialed for a different reason. Revere would go on to publish multiple pamphlets in an attempt to clear his name.

== Death and legacy ==
Sawkins retired to London in 1871 after publishing his Geological Observations of British Guiana. He died on 20 July 1878 in Turnham Green in London, England. A brief biography was published in the Quarterly Journal of the Geological Society of London as well as Frank Cundall's 1914 Catalogue of the Portraits in the Jamaica History Gallery of the Institute of Jamaica. Cundall stated,

[Sawkins] spent nearly fifty years wandering over the face of the earth and will be remembered for his "Reports on the Geology of Jamaica," published in 1869...The mineralogical specimens which he collected are in the museum of the Institute of Jamaica.

== Gallery ==
Landscapes

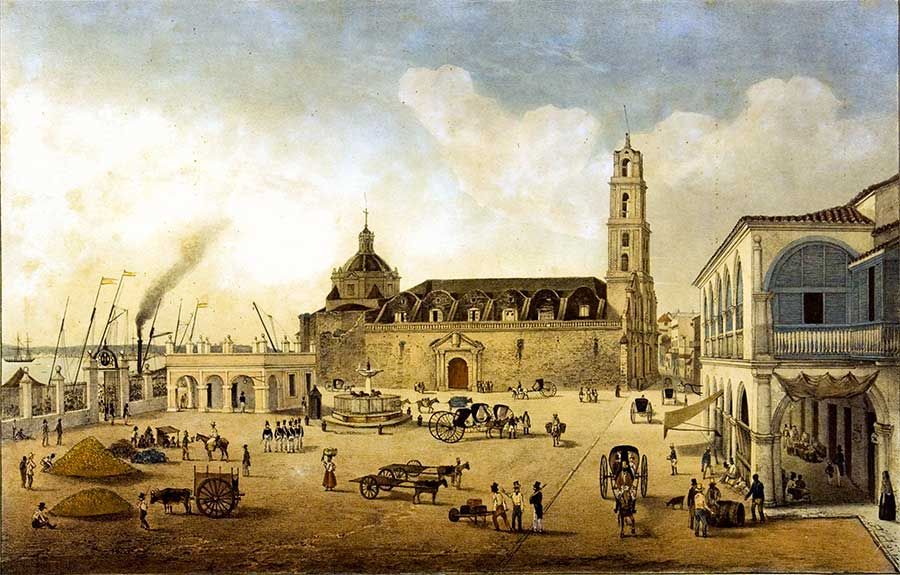
View of the Plaza of San Francisco of Havana, Cuba, 1841

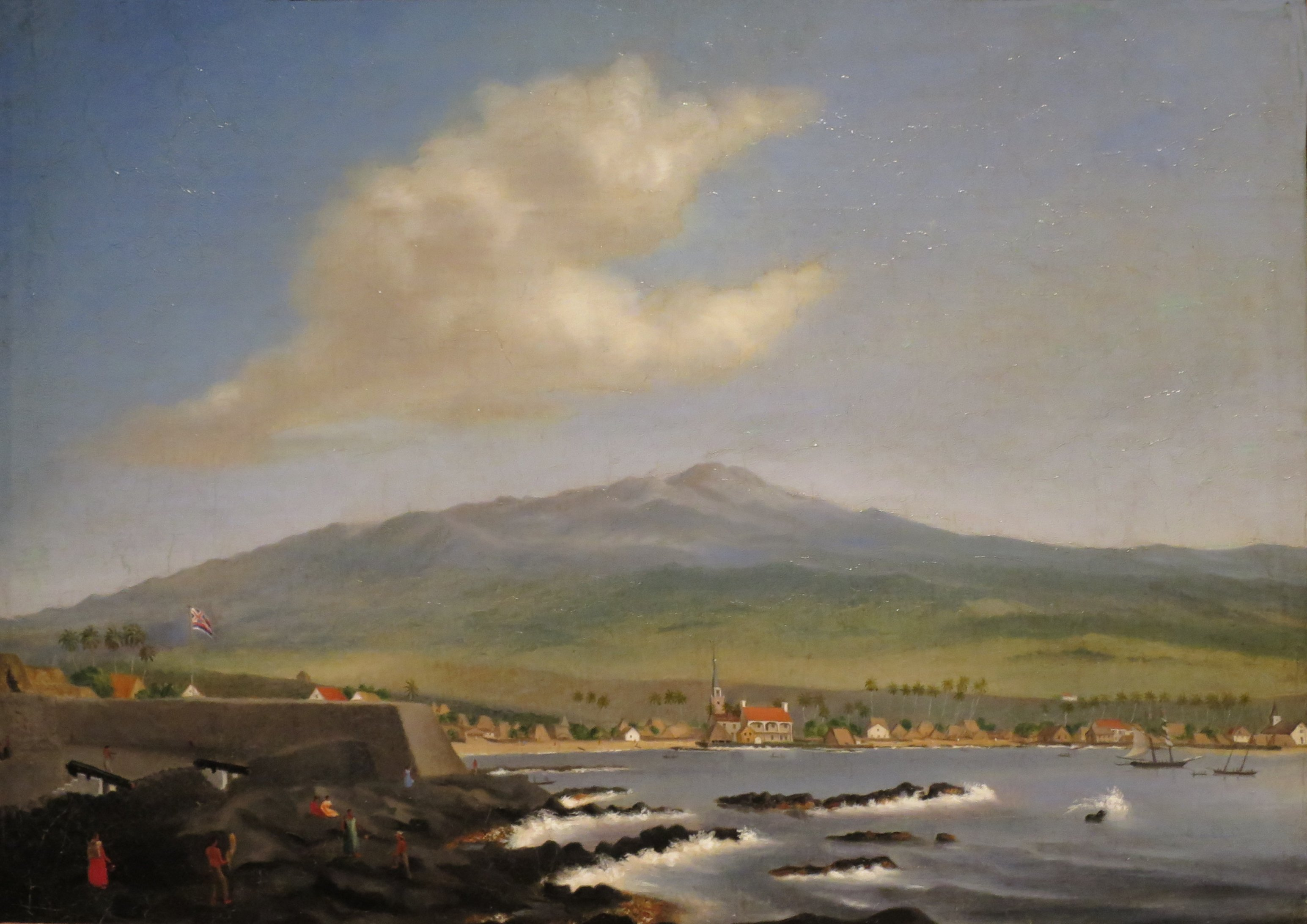
Kailua-Kona with Hualalai, Hulihe'e Palace and Church, 1852

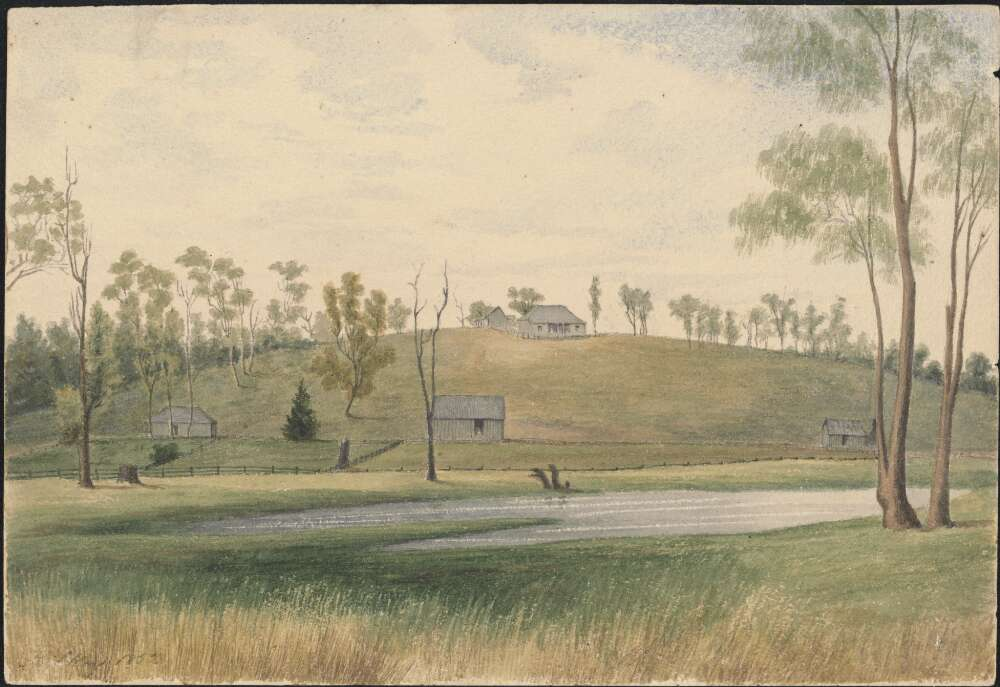
New South Wales, 1852

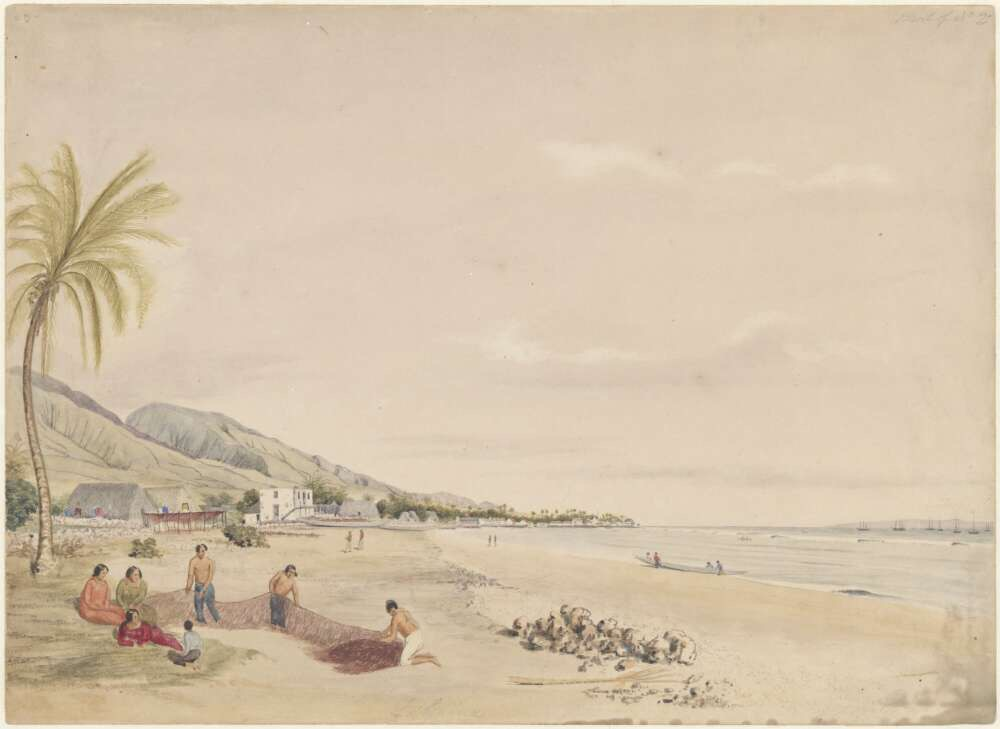
Natives on beach of Lahaina, Hawaii, 1855

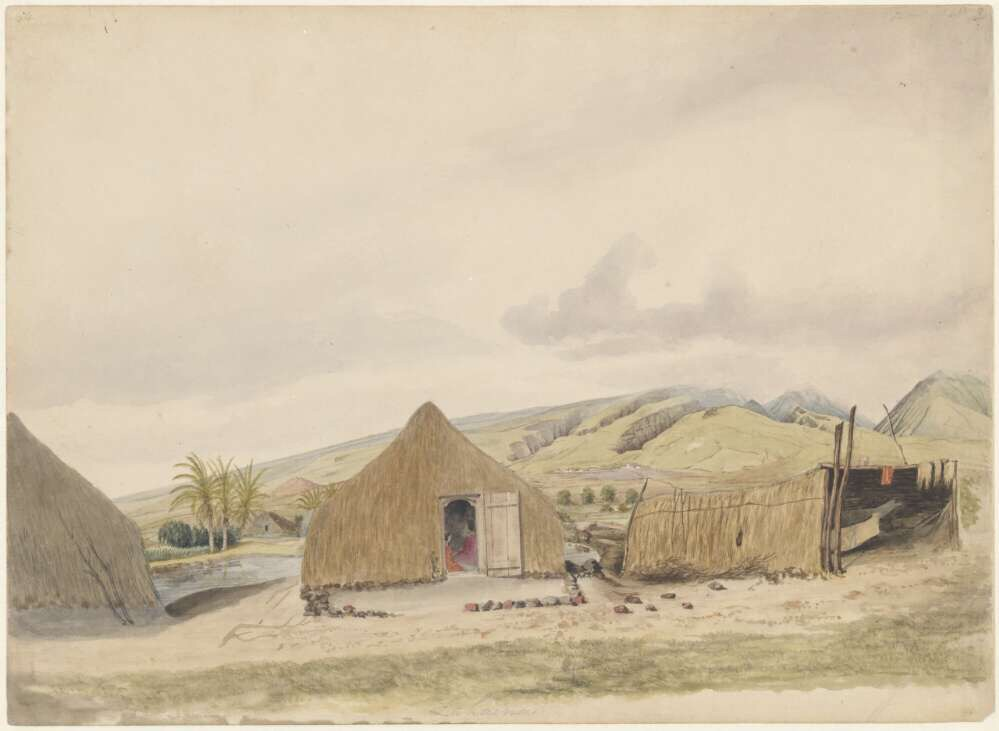
Lahaina, Hawaii landscape, 1855

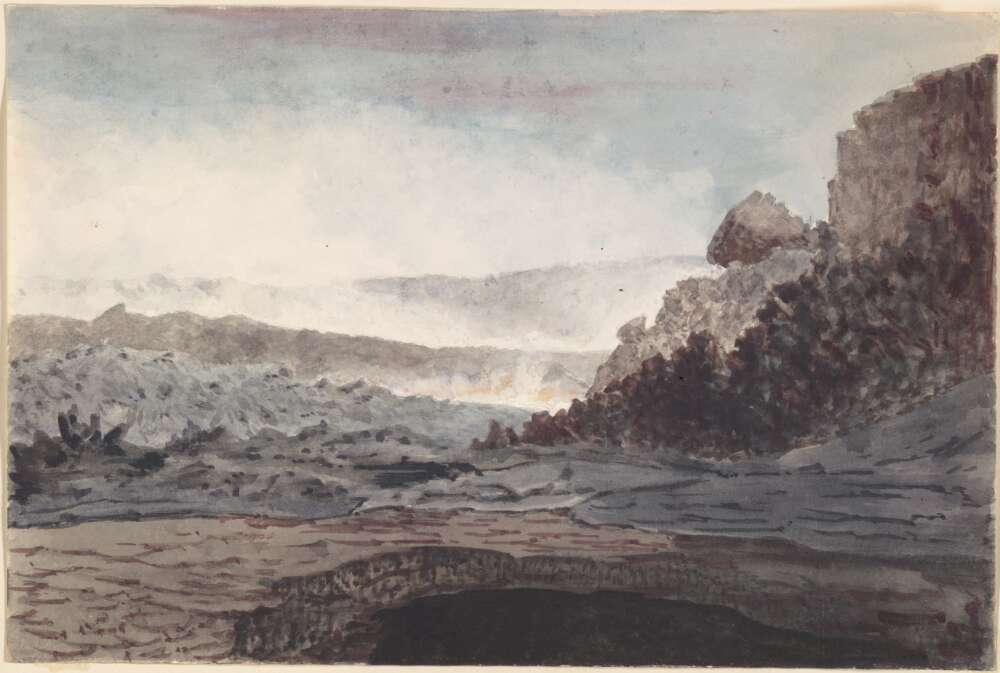
A view in the center of Hawaiian volcano Kiluea, 1855

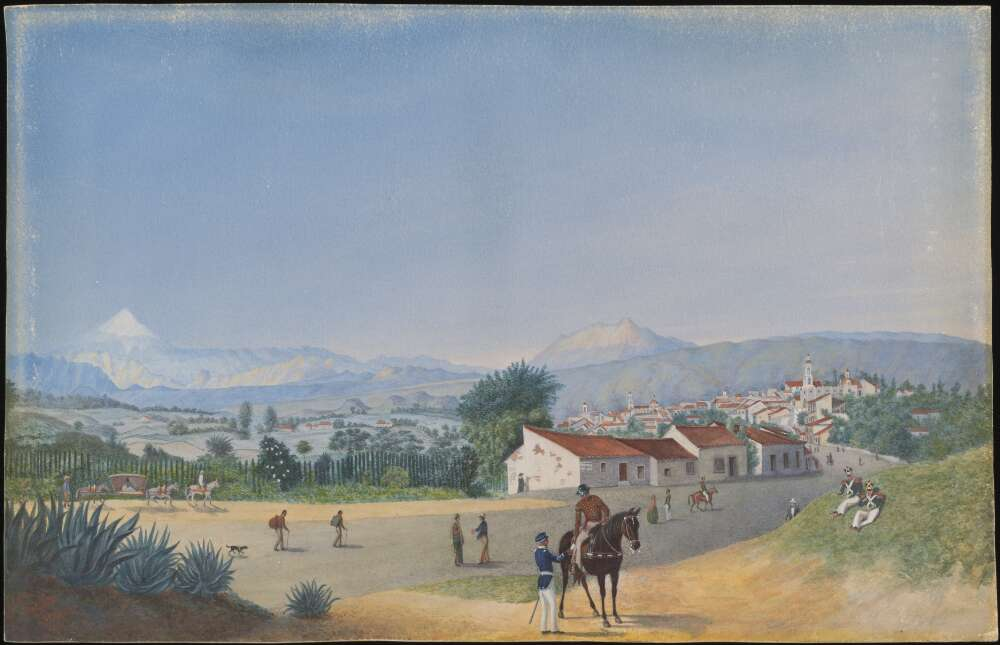
Jalapa, Mexico, 1858

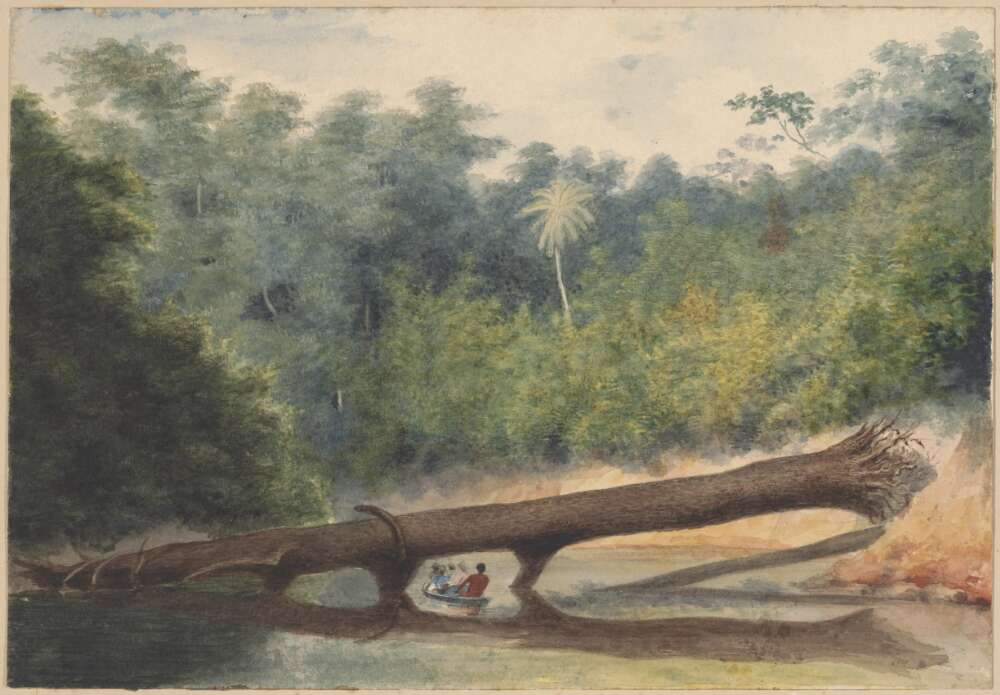
Demerara River, Guyana, 1855

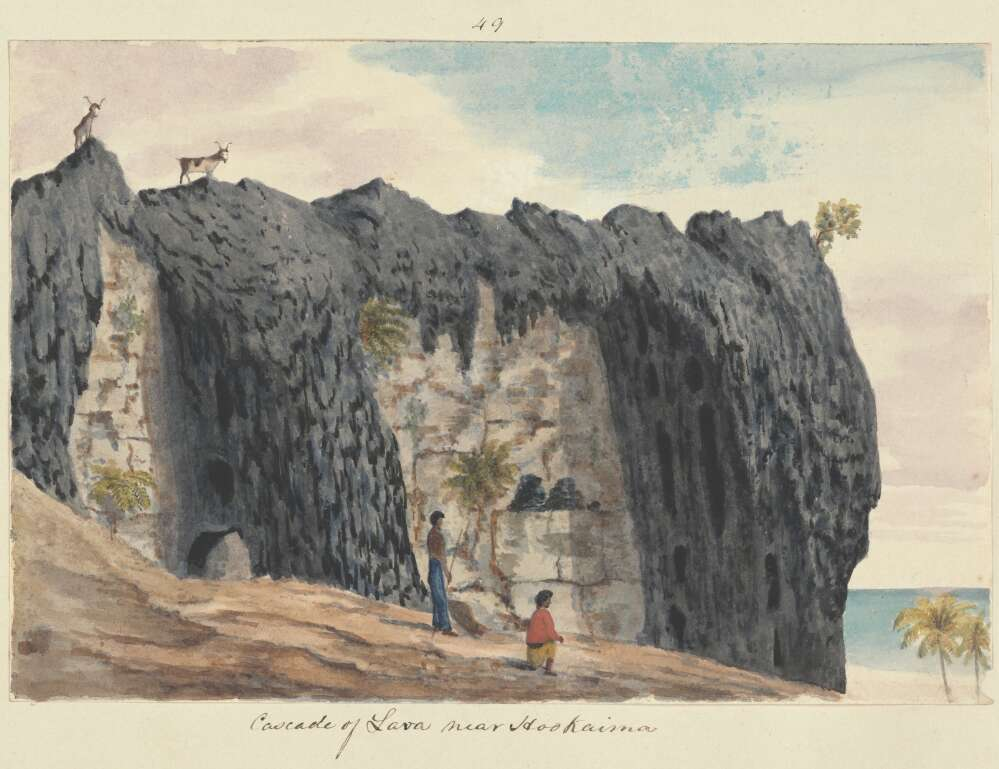
Cascade of lava near Hoʻokena, Hawaii, 1855

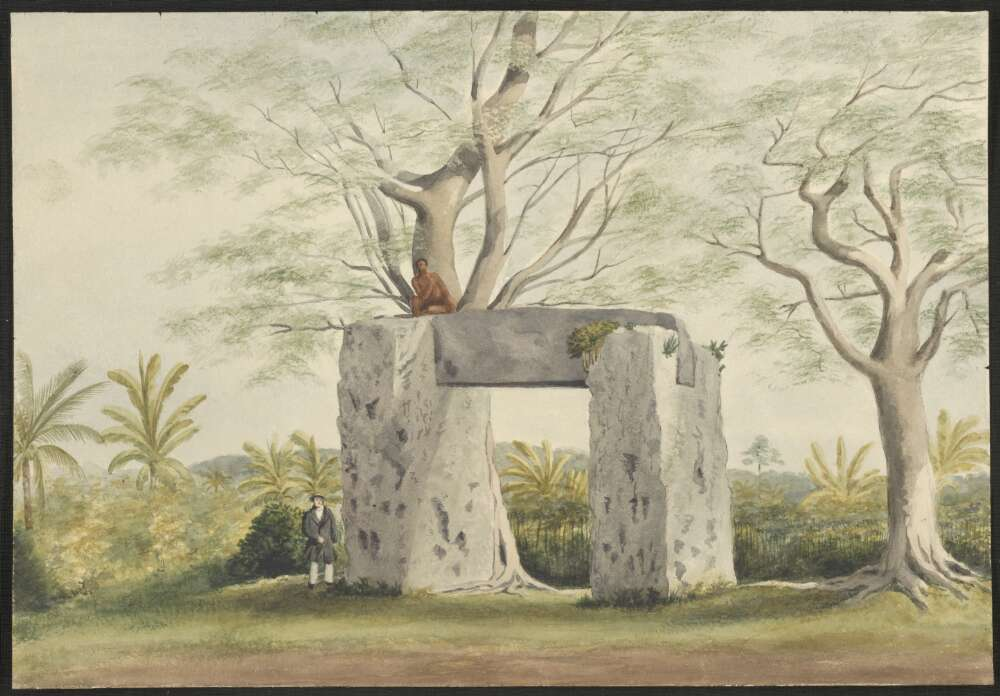
Remains of an ancient gateway near Kolonya, Tongataho, 1853
Portraits

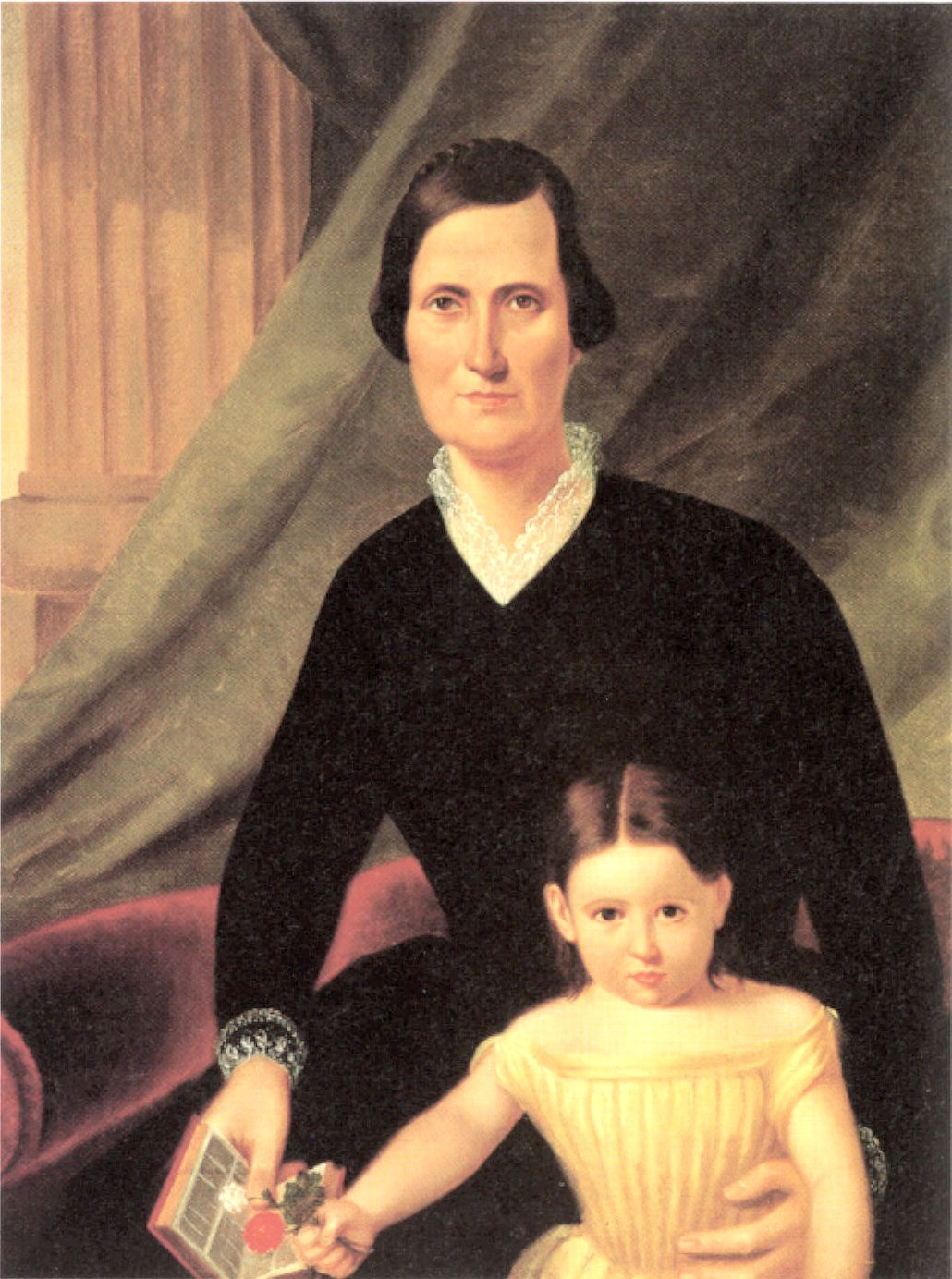
Portrait of Laura Fish Judd and her daughter Juliet Isabel, 1850

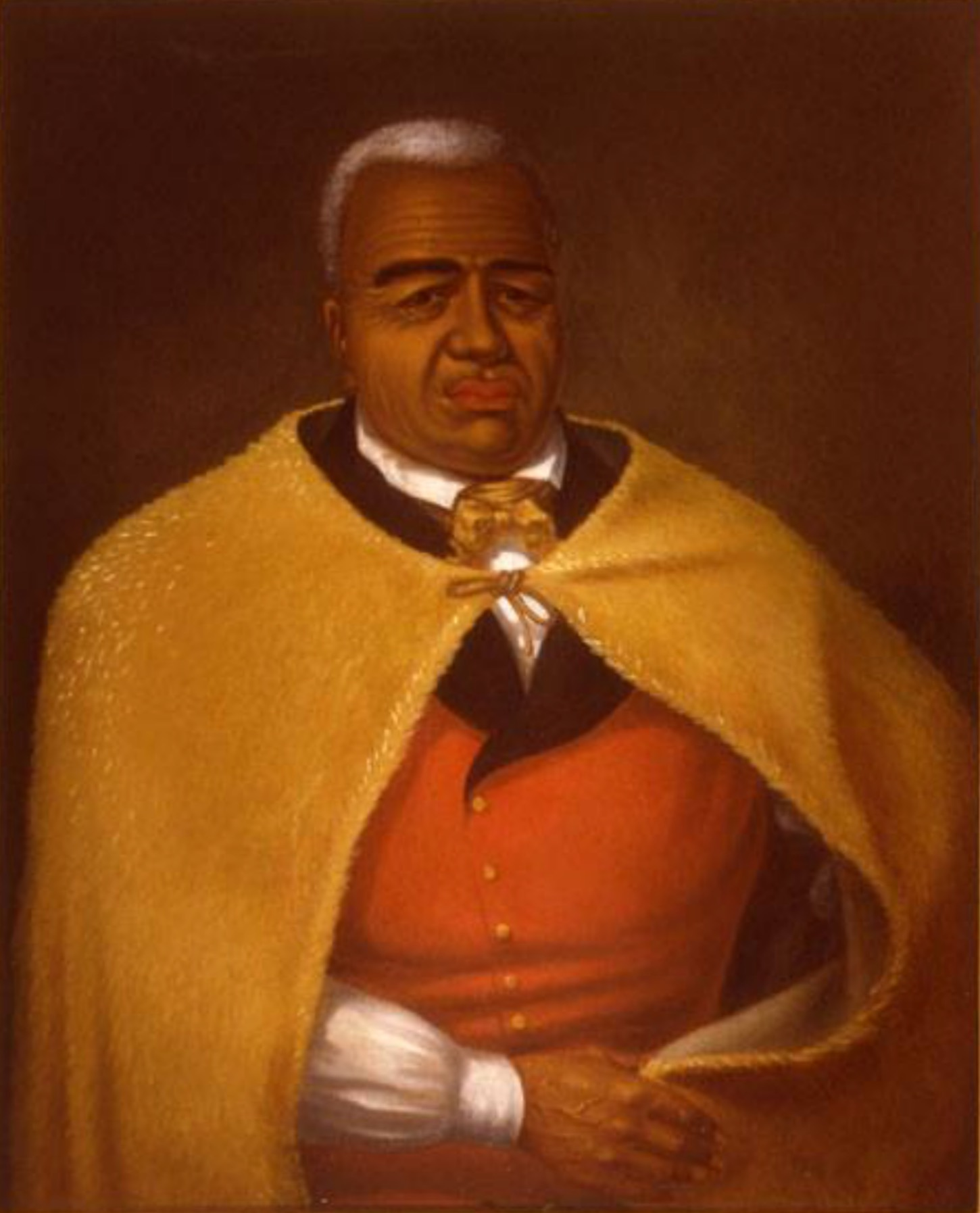
Posthumous portrait of Kamehameha I, 1850

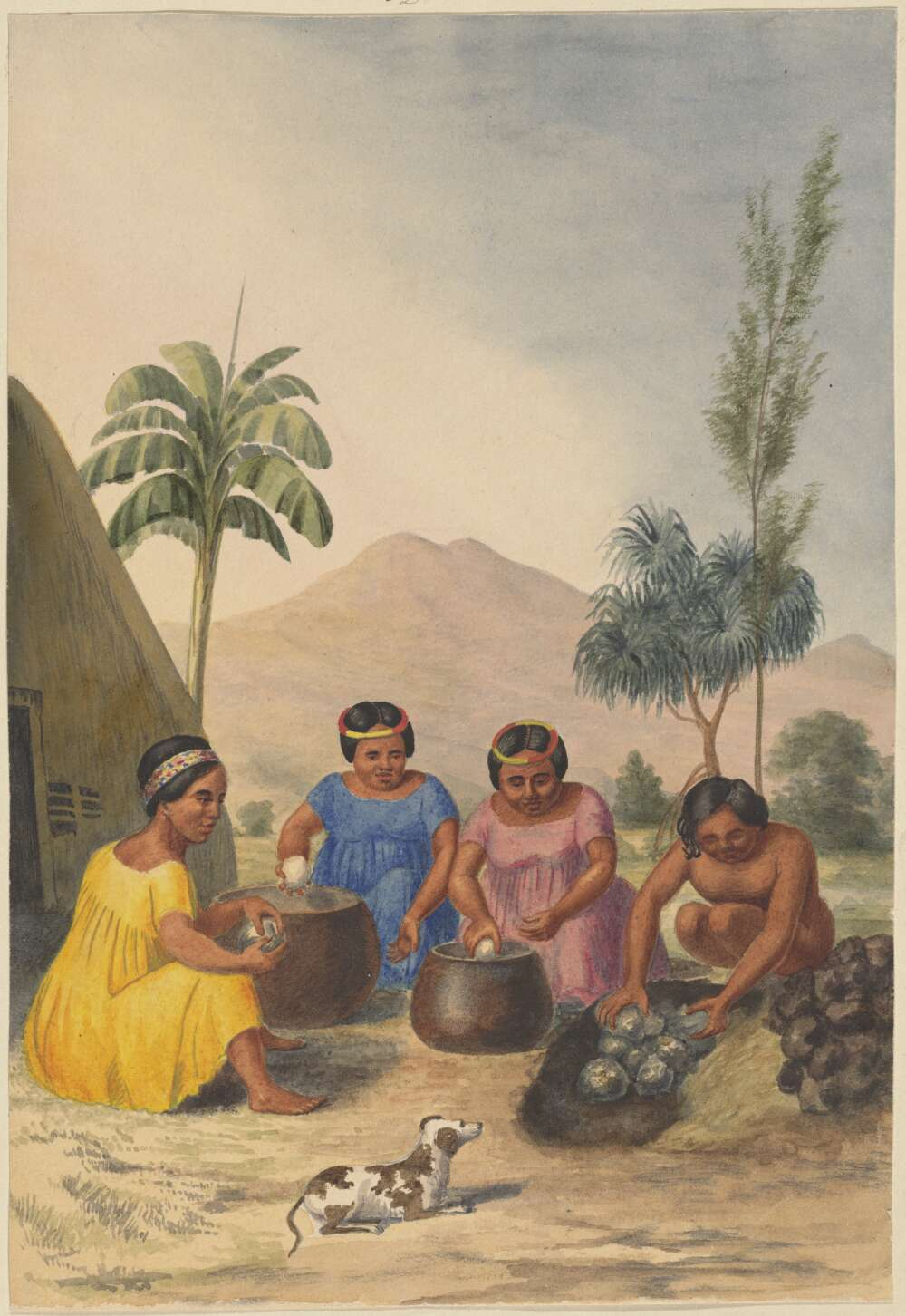
Cleaning the kalo, Hawaii, 1852

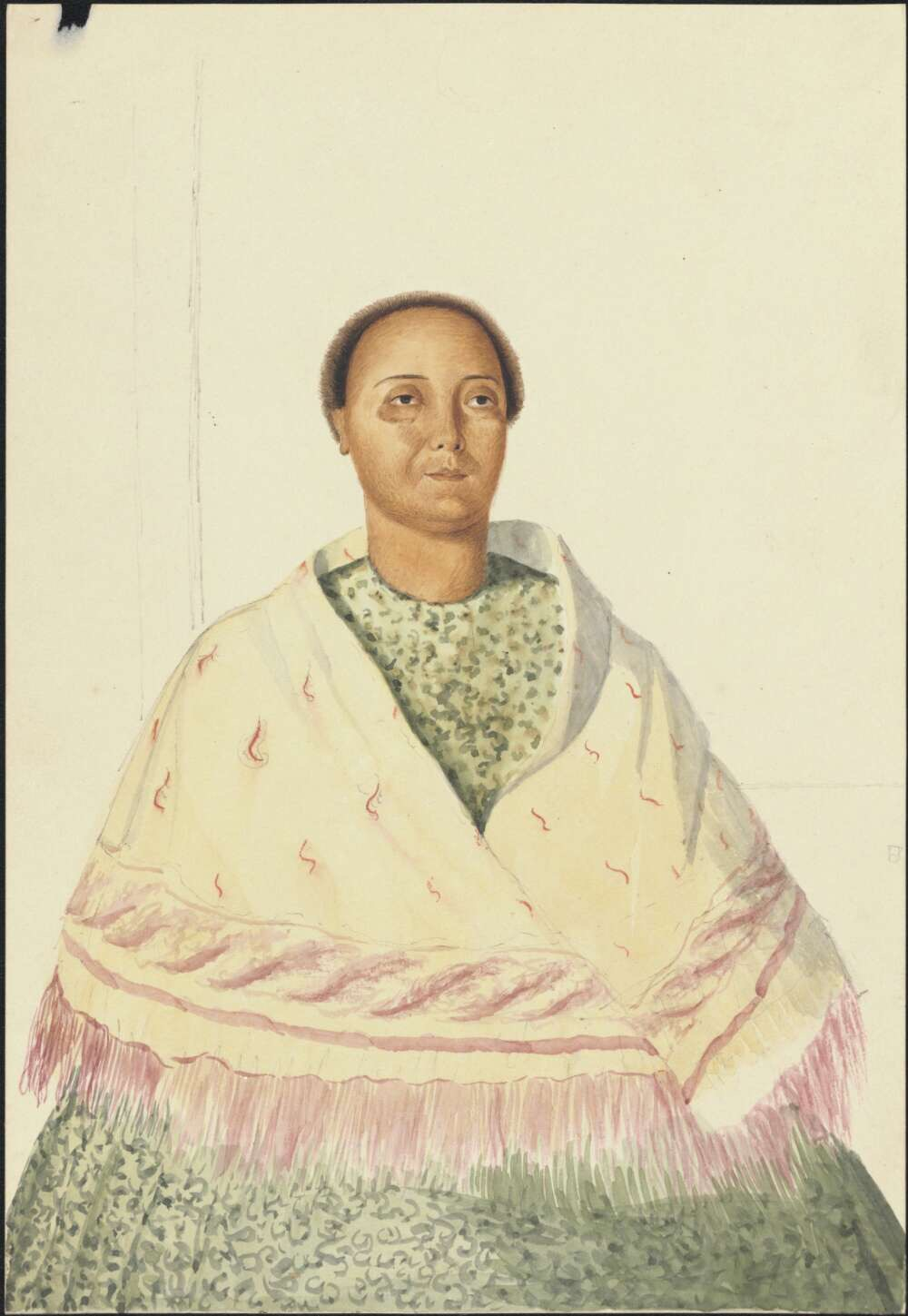
Queen Charlotte of Tongatabu, 1854

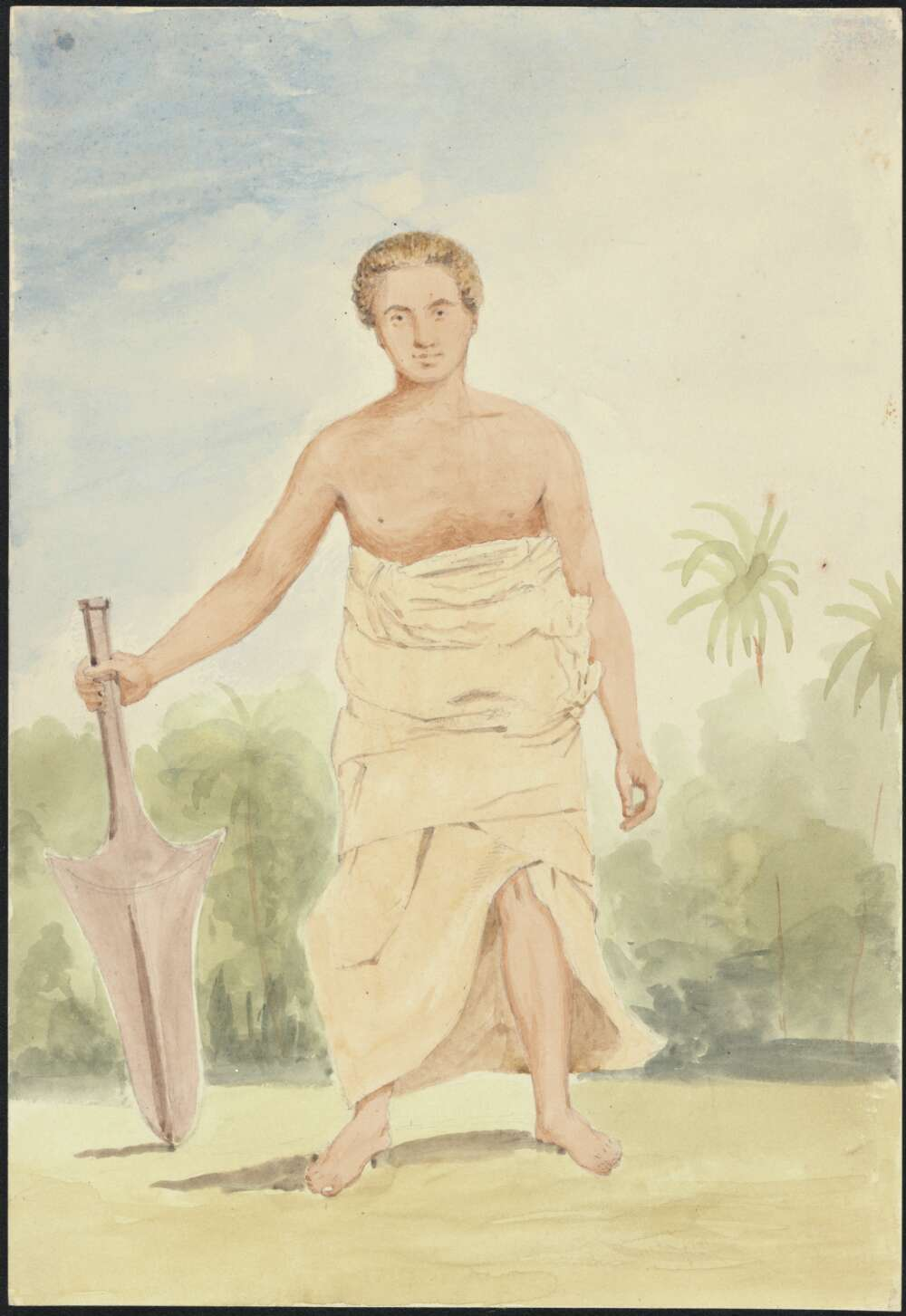
Native Tongatapu warrior, 1854
