= Mirzoeff =

Mirzoeff is a surname. Notable people with the surname include:

- Edward Mirzoeff (born 1936), British television producer and documentary filmmaker
- Nicholas Mirzoeff, visual culture theorist
