= Laufilitonga =

Tongan king (1797–1865)

- Born: 24 August 1797
- Died: 9 December 1865 (aged 68)
- Dynasty: Tuʻi Tonga
- Father: Fatafehi Fuanunu'iava
- Mother: Tupou Veiongo Moheofo
- Religion: Tongan religion, Catholicism

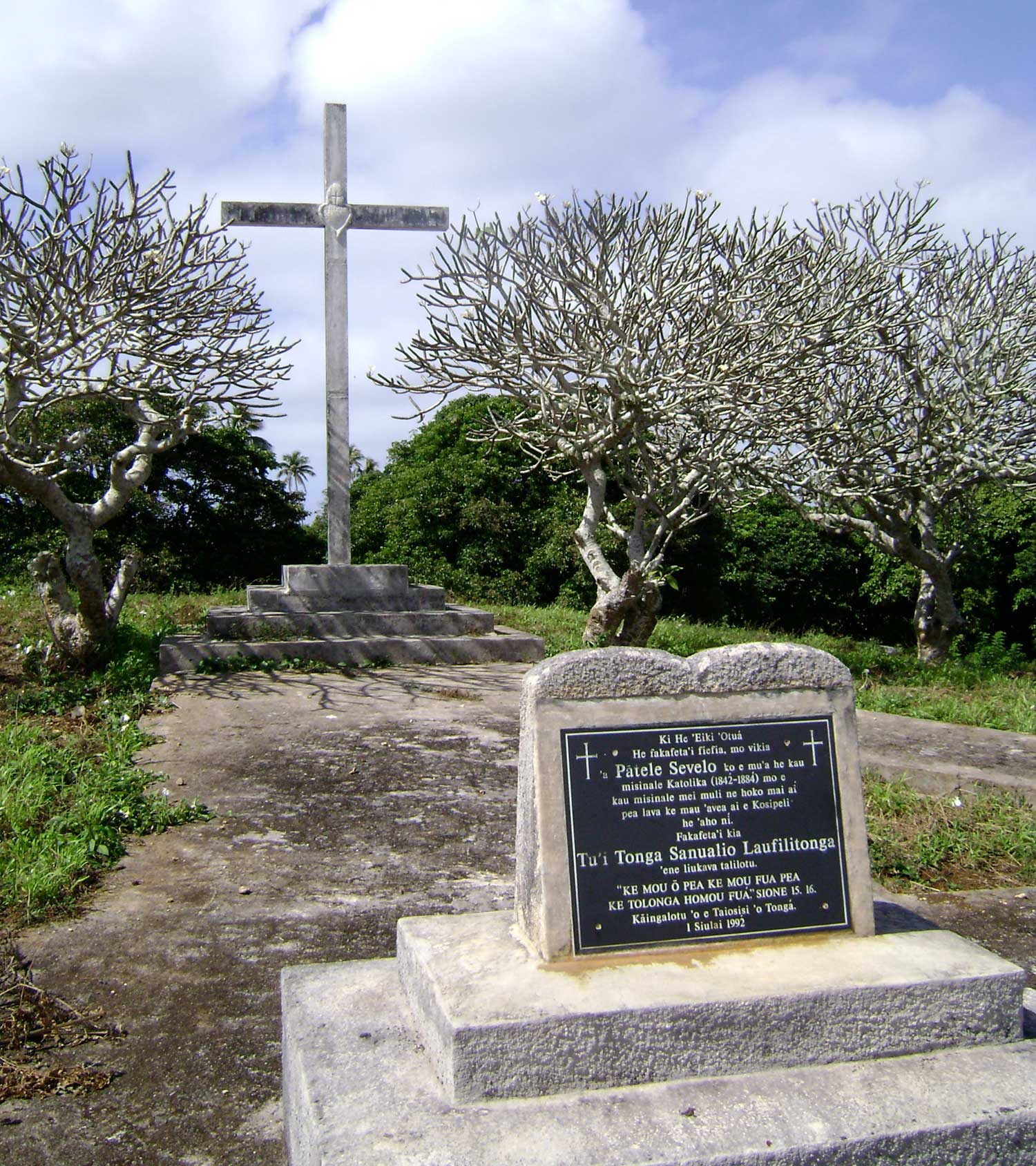
Laufilitonga’s grave

Fatafehi Laufilitonga (24 August 1797 – 9 December 1865) was the 39th and last Tuʻi Tonga, a dynasty of kings in Tonga during the Tuʻi Tonga Empire.

== Biography ==
Only a little is known about Laufilitonga's life. Laufilitonga was the oldest son of King Fatafehi Fuanunu'iava and his wife Tupou Veiongo Moheofo. He succeeded his father in 1810 as head of the House of Tonga but was considered too young to become "Tuʻi Tonga". The title had by that time also declined in power and prestige and the real power lay with the Tuʻi Kanokupolu dynasty. Laufilitonga, however, had ambitions to restore the power of the Tuʻi Tonga and tried to extend his role as spiritual leader into a more political one. He contested Tāufaʻāhau (later to be George Tupou I, the first King of Tonga) residing in the Haʻapai Islands. The final resolution of this struggle was the Battle of Velata, near Tongoleleka on Lifuka, in 1826 in which Laufilitonga was defeated. An important ally at that battle was the chief of Haʻafeva who had taken side against Laufilitonga.Although Laufilitonga was installed as Tuʻi Tonga in 1827, the holder of the title no longer had either political or spiritual power.On November 7, 1851, Laufilitonga converted to Catholicism and was baptised with the name Samuelio Fatafehi Laufilitonga. After his death in 1865 he was buried in the langi Tuʻofefafa i in Muʻa and the title Tuʻi Tonga was absorbed by George Tupou I, who later abolished it in 1875. His wife Sālote Lupepauʻu later married George Tupou I.
