= Lucas Barrett =

British scientist (1837–1862)

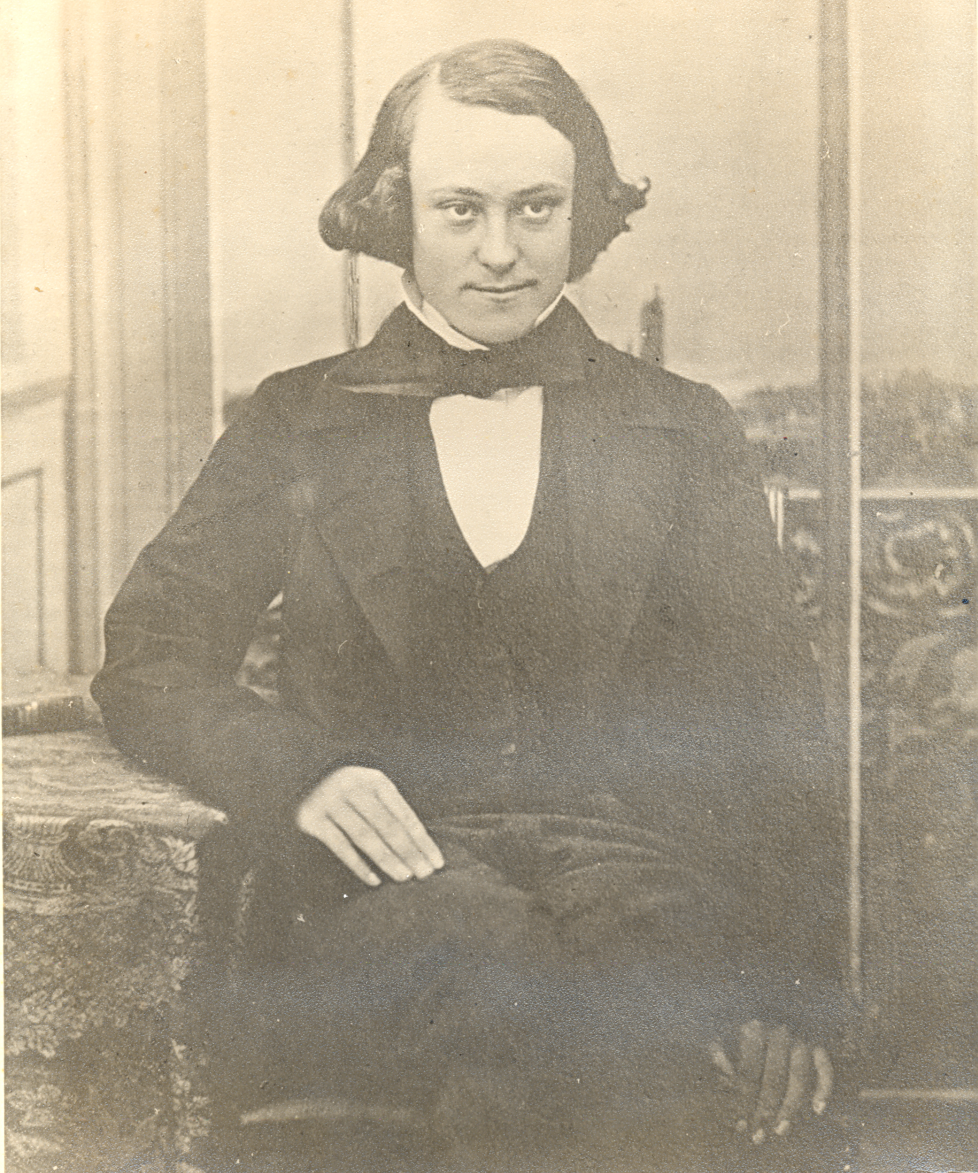
- Circa 1850s photograph of Barrett
- Born: November 14, 1837; London, England
- Died: December 19, 1862; Near Kingston, Jamaica
- Occupations: Naturalist and geologist
- Years active: 1855-1862

Lucas Barrett (14 November 1837 – 19 December 1862) was an English naturalist and geologist. He was the director of the Jamaican Geological Survey from 1859 to 1862. He was a young member of the Geological Society and became England's Government Geological Inspector to the West Indies.

His untimely death was caused by drowning while investigating a sea-bottom near Kingston, Jamaica.

== Early life and education ==
Barrett was born in London on November 14, 1837, the firstborn son of an unidentified mother and George Barrett, an iron founder who designed iron work for the London Kings Cross Railway Station. He completed his preliminary education in Royston, Hertfordshire.

On March 8, 1859, Alice Maria Barrett married Lucas Barrett at Church of St Mary the Great, Cambridge. Sources do not indicate Alice Maria Barrett's career nor the story of their meeting. Alice Maria Barrett's parents were Maria Reed and Robert Barrett. The marriage was recorded in the Cambridge section of the Bury and Norwich Post on March 15, 1859.

Barrett was educated at University College School.

In 1853, he went to Ebersdorf, near Lobenstein, Vogtland, Germany to study botany and chemistry for a year.

== Geology career ==
On May 2, 1855, at the age of 18, Barrett became a member of the Geological Society.

In 1855, he accompanied Robert MacAndrew on a dredging excursion from the Shetland Islands to Norway, Finland, and beyond the Arctic Circle. He subsequently made other cruises, to Greenland and to the coast of Spain. These expeditions laid the foundations of an extensive knowledge of the distribution of marine life.

Circa 1858 in Norway, Barrett and R. MacAndrew discovered Geodia barretti, a massive deep-sea sponge, on the coast of Norway. British naturalist James Scott Bowerbank named it Geodia barretti to honor Barrett.

In 1855, he was engaged by Adam Sedgwick to assist in the Woodwardian Museum at Cambridge. During the following three years, he aided the professor by delivering lectures. He discovered bones of birds in the Cambridge Greensand, and he prepared a geological map of Cambridge on the one-inch Ordnance map. In 1859, when he was twenty-two, he was appointed director of the Geological Survey of Jamaica. There, he determined the Cretaceous age of certain rocks that contained Hippurites. S. P. Woodward named the new genus Barrettia after him. Barrett also collected many fossils from the Miocene and newer strata.

=== West Indian Geological Survey ===
In 1857, the Colonial Office in London set up the West Indian Geological Survey, a geology research team. The first area of interest was the island of Trinidad. The Director of the group was George Parks Wall, assisted by James Gay Sawkins, an American working as a copper miner in Jamaica.

In 1859, Wall resigned following the completion of the Trinidad research. British geologist Roderick Murchison was displeased with the results of the Trinidad survey and refused to nominate the next director. As a result, Colonial Office administrator Henry Ernest Gascoyne Bulwer approached Professor John Phillips at Oxford for a recommendation. Phillips recommended Barrett, who became leader.

On April 1, 1859, James G. Sawkins and his wife Octavia "Rosa" Sawkins arrived at St. Thomas, Jamaica via a mail steamer; they had sailed from the Port-of-Spain, Trinidad and Tobago. Sawkins brought scientific instruments used in his geological survey of Trinidad. The Barrett couple and Sawkins couple met for the first time. During this meeting, Mr. Sawkins learned that the pay he would receive would be insufficient for his means. Upon arriving in Kingston, Jamaica on April 5, Sawkins arranged a meeting with John Peter Grant, then colonial governor of Jamaica. After Barrett wrote a persuasive letter to statesman Edward Bulwer-Lytton asking to increase Sawkins's pay so he would not resign, Sawkins's pay was increased and he remained on the project.

== Death and legacy ==
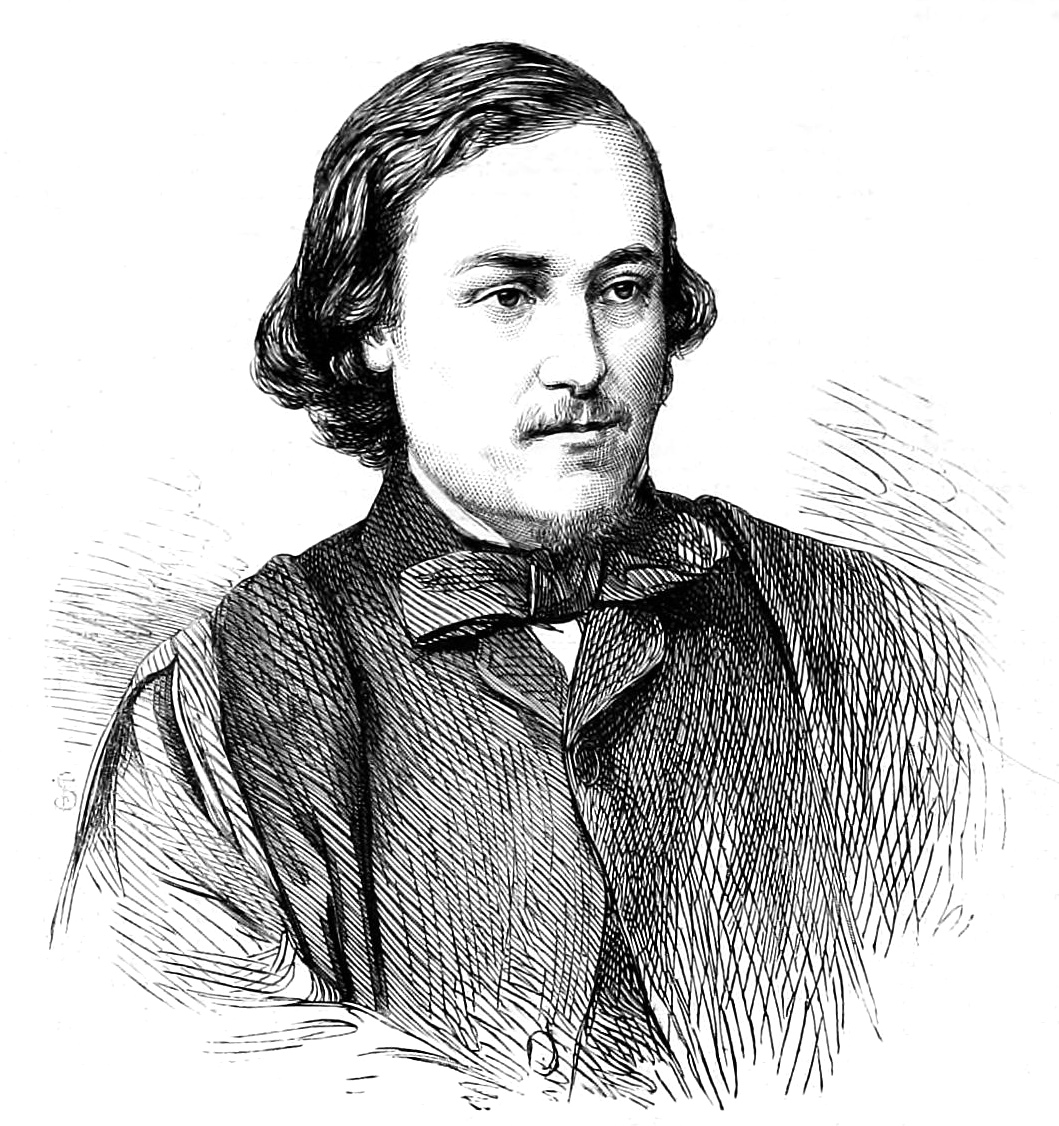
Posthumous 1863 illustration from The Illustrated London News.

Barrett drowned, at the age of twenty-five, while investigating the sea-bottom of Port Royal near Kingston, Jamaica, as part of the Jamaican Geological Survey. Geologist Simon F. Mitchell describes:

[Barrett] carried back to Jamaica a diving-apparatus to enable him personally to explore the reefs. Having once gone down safely and successfully in shallow water, he would not wait for the assistance of his friends; and set out on the 19th of December, attended by a crew and servants, to the coral-reefs outside Port Royal. At some distance from the land he descended into deep water, provided with 100 feet of air-tubing, and holding the "life-line" only in his hand; and after the lapse of more than half an hour he floated to the surface, but no longer alive.

After his death, American mining engineer James G. Sawkins took over Barrett's position as leader of the team.

Barrett was buried at St. Andrew Parish Church.

His posthumous son Arthur Barrett and grandson Lucas Barrett were electrical engineers and ran the firm of Baily, Grundy and Barrett in Cambridge.

In 1962, on the centennial of his death, a plaque monument was dedicated to Barrett. It was replaced by a new plaque in 2005.
