= Queen Salote College =

Location
- Hala Vahaʻakolo; Tongatapu; Tonga
- Coordinates: 21°8′10″S 175°12′21″W

Information
- Type: Public School / Church owned
- Motto: Tongan: Ko Tonga Mo'unga Ki He Loto; Tonga's Strength-hold is its Heart
- Denomination: Free Wesleyan Church of Tonga
- Established: 1926
- Founder: Rev James Egan Moulton, Queen Salote Tupou III
- Principal: Dr. Rev ʻAsinate Samate
- Age: 11 to 18
- Enrollment: 977 (2011)
- Language: Tongan, English
- Hours in school day: 7
- Classrooms: 32
- Colours: Blue and White
- Website: web.archive.org/web/20080509010131/http://www.qsc.to/

Queen Salote College is a private all girls school in Tonga. It is Tonga's only all-girls school, was named after Tonga's late queen, Sālote Lupepauʻu by King Tāufaʻāhau Tupou IV. The school was more commonly known as The Girls' College (Kolisi Fefine).

Located at Vaha'akolo Road opposite Malaʻekula, Tongatapu, the school stands where Tupou College first stood at the time of its establishment in 1866, then to Nafualu in 1921. Girls in Tonga first received formal education in Tupou College in 1870, only four years after the institution was established by Rev. Dr. James Egan Moulton. The main purpose of allowing girls to enter the institution was to train them to become good mothers and wives. In 1873, the schooling came to a sudden end at the misgivings of Mr. Baker about the propriety of the behaviour between the two genders. Only in 1881, were girls re enrolled to the institution to continue schooling.

The decision was made in 1921 to relocate Tupou College to Nafualu (today's Siaʻatoutai Theological College) because the land and facilities were inadequate to cater for the growing enrollments. QSC dates its independent beginnings not from the separation in 1921, but when it gained academic independence from Tupou College in 1926 when the girls sat exams set independently from the exams set at Tupou College.

== Education ==
The school also teaches the students traditional Tongan crafts including, weaving and knitting mats and ta'ovalas, kiekies as well as tapa-making. Classes are from forms 1-7 including a class for Catering & Hospitality.

=== Curriculum ===
The school follows the curriculum of the Tongan Government which is based on the New Zealand Curriculum. The school teaches a huge range of subjects including courses for catering and hospitality as well as courses for nursing.

== Magazine ==
The school has a magazine published annually recording events and activities done at the school throughout that year. The magazine is known as the "Maamaloa Magazine".

== House System ==
The school has eight houses and like Tupou College, are named after major contributors to the Wesleyan Church and the upbringing of Christianity in Tonga. They are also named after notable Tongan and Palangi women in the Tongan society. They are:

- Room 1: Mata'aho (after Her Majesty Queen Halaevalu Mataʻaho ʻAhomeʻe)
- Room 2: Melenaite (after H.R.H. Princess Melenaite Tupou-Moheofo)
- Room 3: Molitoni (after the founder, Rev. Dr. James Egan Moulton)
- Room 4: Rodger Page (after Rev. Rodger Page)
- Room 5: Mrs. Thompson (after the first female principal)
- Room 6: Seluvaia
- Room 7: Lesieli Tonga (after the first female dux of Tupou College)
- Room 8: John Wesley (after the founder of the Methodist Church)
