= Battle of Velata =

The Battle of Velata was fought in Haʻapai, Tonga in September 1826, between Laufilitonga, monarch of the Tuʻi Tonga dynasty, and Taufa'ahau, heir apparent to the Tu'i Kanokupolu dynasty and then monarch of Tonga. The battle was significant because Laufilitonga's defeat marked the decline of the Tu'i Tonga dynasty and solidified Taufa'ahau's powerful position.

== Aftermath ==
Taufa'ahau was baptized in 1831 and claimed the title of King George Tupou, ruler of all the Tongan islands. Upon the death of Laufilitonga in 1865, the title of Tu'i Tonga was absorbed by King George Tapou, who later abolished it in 1875.
