= Nicholas Mirzoeff =

American visual culture theorist

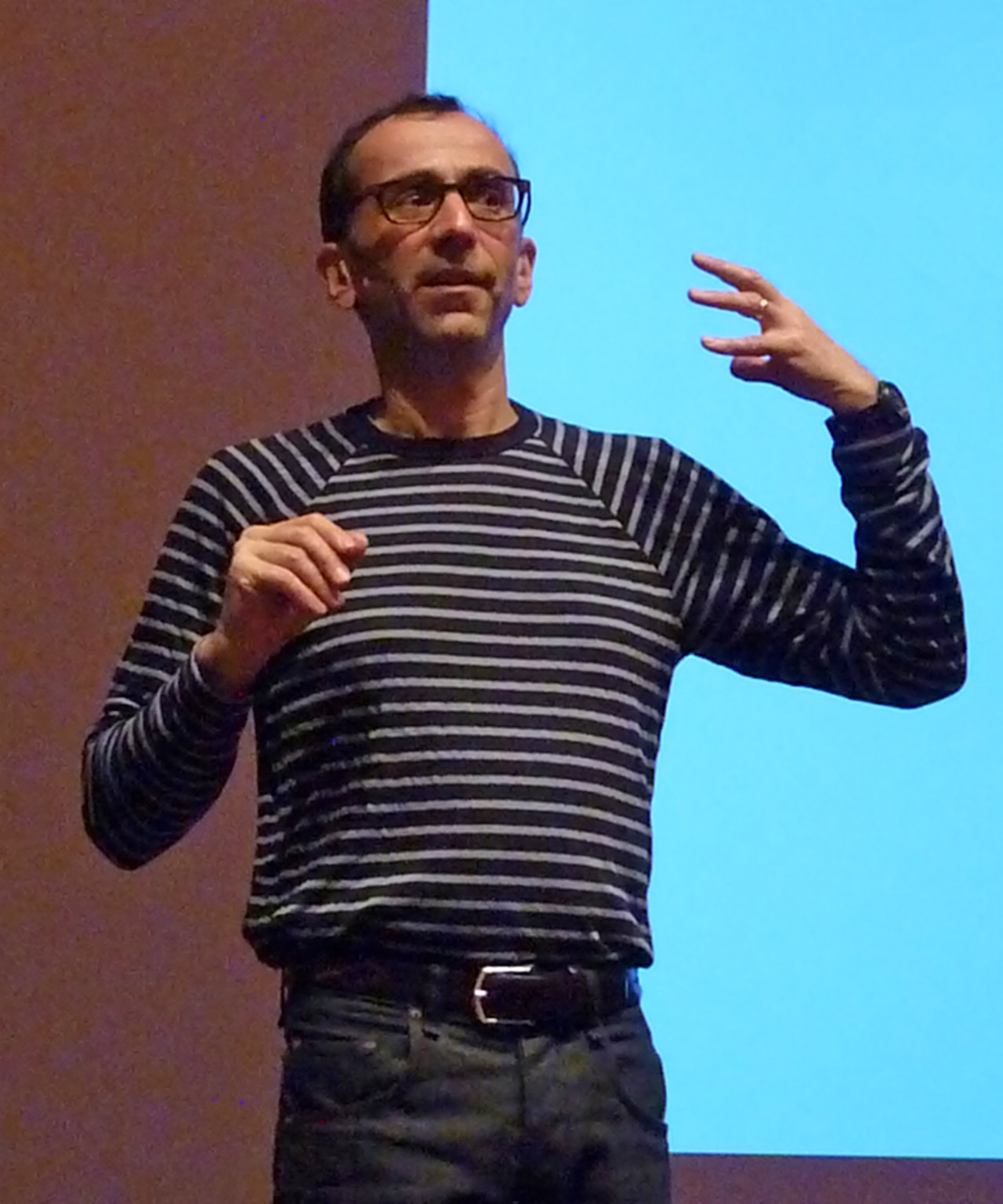
Nicholas Mirzoeff in 2012

Nicholas Mirzoeff is a visual culture theorist and professor in the Department of Media, Culture and Communication at New York University. He is best known for his work developing the field of visual culture, for his widely-used textbook on the subject, and his many related publications. He was Deputy Director of the International Association for Visual Culture from 2012 to 2016 and organised its first conference in 2012. Mirzoeff holds a BA degree from Oxford University and studied for his PhD at the University of Warwick.

== Affiliations ==
- 2007–present: Journal of Photography and Culture, Editorial board member
- 2005: Visiting Canterbury Fellow, University of Canterbury, New Zealand
- 2004–2007: British Film Institute Television Classics, Editorial board member
- 2002–present: Situation Analysis, Editorial board member
- 2002: Visiting Fellow, Sterling and Francine Clark Art Institute, Williamstown MA
- 2002: Leverhulme Visiting Professor, University of Nottingham, UK
- 2001–present: The Journal of Visual Culture, Editorial board member
- 2001: Visiting Fellow, Humanities Research Center, Australian National University, Canberra, Australia
- 2001: William Andrews Clark Memorial Library, UCLA, Visiting Fellow
- 2000–2005: Visual Culture Caucus, Founder and Co-President
- 2000–2005: College Art Association, board of directors
- 1996: Postdoctoral Fellow, Humanities Institute, Stony Brook University
- 1994: Huntington Library, Pasadena, CA, Visiting Fellow
- 1993: Yale Center for British Art, Visiting Fellow
- 1992: J. Paul Getty Center, Postdoctoral Fellow in the History of Art and the Humanities
- 1991: NEH Postdoctoral Fellow, UCLA Center for 17th and 18th Century Studies

== Awards ==
- 2006: Steinhardt Challenge Grant

== Publications and bibliography ==
- "To See in the Dark: The Nakba and the Landswept Way of Seeing" Social Text (2023) 41 (3 (156)): 59–75.
- "The Appearance of Black Lives Matter" (Miami: NAME Publications, 2017)
- How to See the World (London: Pelican, 2015)
- The Right to Look: A Counterhistory of Visuality (Duke University Press, 2011)
- Seinfeld: A Critical Study of the Series (British Film Institute, 2007)
- Watching Babylon: the War in Iraq and Global Visual Culture (Routledge, 2005) translated into Italian as Guardare la Guerra (Rome: Meltemi, 2005)
- (as editor) Diaspora and Visual Culture: Representing Africans and Jews (London and New York: Routledge, 2001)
- An Introduction to Visual Culture (London and New York: Routledge, 1999) translations into Italian, Spanish, Korean and Chinese. Second fully revised edition, 2008. ISBN 978-0415327596
- (as editor) The Visual Culture Reader (London and New York: Routledge, 1998) Second fully revised edition, 2002. ISBN 978-0415252225
- Bodyscape: Art, Modernity and the Ideal Figure (London and New York: 1995) translated into Korean
- Silent Poetry: deafness, sign and visual culture in modern France (Princeton and London: Princeton University Press, 1995)
